= Eddie Robinson Award =

Award in college football

- Awarded for: College football's top head coach in the Division I Football Championship Subdivision
- Location: New York City
- Country: United States
- Presented by: Stats Perform

History
- First award: 1987
- Most recent: Kevin Cahill, Lehigh
- Website: www.fcs.football

The Eddie Robinson Award is awarded annually to college football's top head coach in the NCAA Division I Football Championship Subdivision (formerly Division I-AA). The award was established by The Sports Network, since merged into Stats Perform, in 1987 and is voted upon by the division's sports information directors and selected sports writers. The award is named for Eddie Robinson, the College Football Hall of Fame coach, who retired in 1997 after 56 years at Grambling State University.

Along with the Walter Payton Award and Buck Buchanan Award, it is presented the night before the annual NCAA Division I Football Championship.

== Winners ==
| Year | Winner | School |
|---|---|---|
| 1987 | Mark Duffner | Holy Cross |
| 1988 | Bill Russo | Lafayette |
| 1989 | Erk Russell | Georgia Southern |
| 1990 | Gene McDowell | UCF |
| 1991 | Chris Ault | Nevada |
| 1992 | Charlie Taaffe | The Citadel |
| 1993 | Dan Allen | Boston University |
| 1994 | Jim Tressel | Youngstown State |
| 1995 | Houston Nutt | Murray State |
| 1996 | Darren Barbier | Nicholls State |
| 1997 | Andy Talley | Villanova |
| 1998 | Paul Johnson | Georgia Southern |
| 1999 | Mickey Matthews | James Madison |
| 2000 | Joe Glenn | Montana |
| 2001 | Pete Lembo | Lehigh |
| 2002 | Tommy Tate | McNeese State |
| 2003 | Mike Ayers | Wofford |
| 2004 | Jerry Kill | Southern Illinois |
| 2005 | Sean McDonnell | New Hampshire |
| 2006 | Jerry Moore | Appalachian State |
| 2007 | Mark Farley | Northern Iowa |
| 2008 | Mickey Matthews (2) | James Madison |
| 2009 | Henry Frazier III | Prairie View A&M |
| 2010 | Tony Samuel | Southeast Missouri State |
| 2011 | Rob Ambrose | Towson |
| 2012 | Craig Bohl | North Dakota State |
| 2013 | Craig Bohl (2) | North Dakota State |
| 2014 | Sean McDonnell (2) | New Hampshire |
| 2015 | Joe Moglia | Coastal Carolina |
| 2016 | K. C. Keeler | Sam Houston State |
| 2017 | Will Healy | Austin Peay |
| 2018 | Dan Hawkins | UC Davis |
| 2019 | Troy Taylor | Sacramento State |
| 2020 | Scott Wachenheim | VMI |
| 2021 | Deion Sanders | Jackson State |
| 2022 | John Stiegelmeier | South Dakota State |
| 2023 | Jimmy Rogers | South Dakota State |
| 2024 | Brent Vigen | Montana State |
| 2025 | Kevin Cahill | Lehigh |
