= Henry Frazier III =

American football player and coach (born 1968)

Current position
- Title: Head coach
- Team: Virginia State
- Conference: CIAA
- Record: 27–13

Biographical details
- Born: March 20, 1968 (age 58); Washington, D.C., U.S.

Playing career
- 1986–1989: Bowie State
- Position: Quarterback

Coaching career (HC unless noted)
- 1990–1992: Bowie State (assistant)
- 1994–1998: Central HS (MD)
- 1999–2003: Bowie State
- 2004–2010: Prairie View A&M
- 2011–2013: North Carolina Central
- 2017–2020: Bowie State (assistant to HC)
- 2022–present: Virginia State

Administrative career (AD unless noted)
- 2021: Maryland (dir. of leadership & character development)

Head coaching record
- Overall: 104–81

Accomplishments and honors

Championships
- 1 SWAC (2009); 2 CIAA Eastern Division (2002–2003); 1 SWAC West Division (2009)

Awards
- CIAA Coach of the Year (2001); 100% Wrong Club Coach of the Year (2001); College Sporting News Coach of the Year (2007); Sheridan Broadcast Network Cocah of the Year (2008); AFCA Region 3 Coach of the Year (2008); BOXTOROW HBCU Coach of the Year (2009); Sheridan Broadcast Network Coach of the Year (2009); Eddie Robinson Award (2009); SWAC Coach of Year (2009); ESPN/HBCU SWAC Coach of the Year (2009); AFCA Region 3 Coach of the Year (2009); Pigskin Club of Washington, DC Coach of the Year (2009)

Henry Frazier III (born March 20, 1968) is an American college football coach and former player. He is the head football coach for Virginia State University, a position he has held since 2022. Frazier served as the head football coach at Bowie State University from 1999 to 2003, Prairie View A&M University from 2004 to 2010, and North Carolina Central University from 2011 to 2012.

== Coaching career ==
=== Bowie State ===
Fraizer's first collegiate head coaching position was the head coach at Bowie State University for five seasons, from 1999 to 2003. At Bowie State, his teams produced a record of 26–24.

=== Prairie View A&M ===
In 2004 Frazier was named the 23rd head football coach at Prairie View A&M University in Prairie View, Texas. His record at Prairie View was 43–30. Upon his resignation at Prairie View A&M, Frazier was the second winningest coach in Prairie View A&M football history.

=== North Carolina Central ===
On December 16, 2010, Frazier was introduced as the 21st head coach of the North Carolina Central University Eagles. Frazier succeeded Mose Rison and inherited an Eagles team that posted a 3–8 record during the 2010 campaign. His contract was for five years, with a base salary of $225,000. Frazier recorded a record of 8–14.

=== Virginia State ===
In May 2022, it was announced that Frazier would be returning to the sidelines as a head coach once again. He was hired as the head coach of the Virginia State Trojans.

== Head coaching record ==
=== College ===
Year	Team	Overall	Conference	Standing	Bowl/playoffs	TSN^{#}	Coaches^{°}
Bowie State Bulldogs (Central Intercollegiate Athletic Association) (1999–2003)
1999	Bowie State	5–4	4–3	T–4th			
2000	Bowie State	2–8	2–4	3rd (Eastern)			
2001	Bowie State	7–3	4–2	3rd (Eastern)			
2002	Bowie State	6–5	5–2	T–1st (Eastern)			
2003	Bowie State	6–4	5–2	T–1st (Eastern)			
Bowie State:		26–24	20–13				
Prairie View A&M Panthers (Southwestern Athletic Conference) (2004–2010)
2004	Prairie View A&M	3–8	1–6	4th (West)			
2005	Prairie View A&M	5–6	3–6	T–3rd (West)			
2006	Prairie View A&M	3–7	2–7	5th (West)			
2007	Prairie View A&M	7–3	6–3	T–2nd (West)			
2008	Prairie View A&M	9–1	6–1	2nd (West)		25	25
2009	Prairie View A&M	9–1	7–0	1st (West)		15	19
2010	Prairie View A&M	7–4	6–3	3rd (West)			
Prairie View A&M:		43–30	31–26				
North Carolina Central Eagles (Mid-Eastern Athletic Conference) (2011–2012)
2011	North Carolina Central	2–9	1–7	T–9th			
2012	North Carolina Central	6–5	5–3	T–3rd			
North Carolina Central:		8–14	6–10				
Virginia State (Central Intercollegiate Athletic Association) (2022–present)
2022	Virginia State	6–4	5–3	T–3rd (Northern)			
2023	Virginia State	8–2	6–2	2nd (Northern)			
2024	Virginia State	7–4	6–2	2nd			
2025	Virginia State	6–4	4–3	T–4th			
Virginia State:		27–13	21–9				
Total:		104–81					
National championship Conference title Conference division title or championship game berth
