= Delta Classic =

Annual college football game

- The Delta Classic 4 Literacy
- Stadium: War Memorial Stadium
- Location: Little Rock, Arkansas
- Operated: 2006-2012

The Delta Classic 4 Literacy (also known as the Delta Classic) was a college football game held between historically black colleges. It was held annually in Little Rock, Arkansas from 2006 to 2012.

== History ==
Fitz Hill created the event, then known as the Literacy Classic while serving as head football coach at San Jose State University. After becoming president of Arkansas Baptist College, Hill restarted the event in Little Rock as The Delta Classic 4 Literacy, with the intent of raising awareness regarding illiteracy in the Delta region. Proceeds from the game go to the Arkansas Literacy Council. The first game in the Arkansas version of the Delta Classic was played between Grambling State University and the University of Arkansas-Pine Bluff in October, 2006, with UAPB gaining the victory en route to winning the Southwestern Athletic Conference Western Division title that season. In the second Delta Classic held on October 13, 2007, Grambling State defeated UAPB 30–24.

The Delta Classic 4 Literacy was discontinued in 2012 with the last game in the series being a 17–14 victory by UAPB over Langston University. UAPB ended with a 3–4 record in the Delta Classic, including two victories against Grambling State in 2006 and 2009.

== Game results ==
Date	Winner	Opponent	Score	Attendance	Ref
October 14, 2006	Arkansas–Pine Bluff	Grambling State	33–28	30,216	
October 13, 2007	Grambling State	Arkansas–Pine Bluff	30–24	40,067	
November 8, 2008	Grambling State	Arkansas–Pine Bluff	28–7	15,500	
November 11, 2009	Arkansas–Pine Bluff	Grambling State	49–42	26,712	
October 30, 2010	Grambling State	Arkansas–Pine Bluff	35–25	29,373	
September 3, 2011	Langston	Arkansas–Pine Bluff	19–12	24,474	
September 1, 2012	Arkansas–Pine Bluff	Langston	17–14	14,500	

== See also ==
- List of black college football classics
- University of Arkansas at Pine Bluff
- UAPB Golden Lions football
