= 1977 Prairie View A&M Panthers football team =

American college football season

1977 Prairie View A&M Panthers football
- Conference: Southwestern Athletic Conference
- Record: 3–8 (1–5 SWAC)
- Head coach: Hoover J. Wright (8th season)
- Home stadium: Edward L. Blackshear Field; Rice Stadium

1977 Southwestern Athletic Conference football standings
	Conf.					Overall
Team	W		L		T	W		L		T
Grambling State $	6	–	0	–	0	10	–	1	–	0
Jackson State	5	–	1	–	0	8	–	3	–	0
Texas Southern	3	–	2	–	1	6	–	4	–	1
Mississippi Valley State	2	–	4	–	0	5	–	5	–	0
Alcorn State	2	–	4	–	0	3	–	8	–	0
Southern	1	–	4	–	1	3	–	7	–	1
Prairie View A&M	1	–	5	–	0	3	–	8	–	0
$ – Conference champion; The Conference was a hybrid of Division I and II programs. Mississippi Valley State and Prairie View A&M were classified as Division II. All the others were classified as Division I.

The 1977 Prairie View A&M Panthers football team represented Prairie View A&M University as a member of the Southwestern Athletic Conference (SWAC) during the 1977 NCAA Division II football season. Led by eighth-year head coach Hoover J. Wright, the Panthers compiled an overall record of 3–8, with a conference record of 1–5, and finished seventh in the SWAC.

== Schedule ==
Date	Opponent	Site	Result	Source
September 11	vs. East Texas State*	Cotton Bowl; Dallas, TX	L 10–38	
September 17	Jackson State	Edward L. Blackshear Field; Prairie View, TX	L 2–27	
September 24	Southern	Rice Stadium; Houston, TX	L 6–46	
October 1	at Grambling State	Grambling Stadium; Grambling, LA (rivalry)	L 7–70	
October 8	at Southwest Texas State*	Evans Field; San Marcos, TX	W 17–7	
October 15	at Texas Lutheran*	Matador Stadium; Seguin, TX	L 14–19	
October 22	at Bishop*	P.C. Cobb Stadium; Dallas, TX	W 39–7	
October 29	Mississippi Valley State	Edward L. Blackshear Field; Prairie View, TX	W 3–0	
November 5	at Arkansas–Pine Bluff*	Pumphrey Stadium; Pine Bluff, AR	L 20–33	
November 12	at Alcorn State	Henderson Stadium; Lorman, MS	L 12–31	
November 19	at Texas Southern	Jeppesen Stadium; Houston, TX (rivalry)	L 28–29	
*Non-conference game
