= 1977 Tennessee State Tigers football team =

American college football season

1977 Tennessee State Tigers football
- Conference: Independent
- Record: 8–1–1
- Head coach: John Merritt (15th season)
- Home stadium: Hale Stadium

1977 NCAA Division I independents football records
	Conf.					Overall
Team	W		L		T	W		L		T
No. 1 Notre Dame		–		–		11	–	1	–	0
No. 5 Penn State		–		–		11	–	1	–	0
Colgate		–		–		10	–	1	–	0
North Texas State *		–		–		10	–	1	–	0
No. 16 San Diego State		–		–		10	–	1	–	0
Tennessee State		–		–		8	–	1	–	1
No. 14 Florida State		–		–		10	–	2	–	0
No. 8 Pittsburgh		–		–		9	–	2	–	1
East Carolina		–		–		8	–	3	–	0
Rutgers		–		–		8	–	3	–	0
Army		–		–		7	–	4	–	0
Louisville		–		–		7	–	4	–	1
Boston College		–		–		6	–	5	–	0
Cincinnati		–		–		5	–	4	–	2
Georgia Tech		–		–		6	–	5	–	0
Memphis State		–		–		6	–	5	–	0
Northwestern State		–		–		6	–	5	–	0
Syracuse		–		–		6	–	5	–	0
William & Mary		–		–		6	–	5	–	0
Southern Miss		–		–		6	–	5	–	0
Temple		–		–		5	–	5	–	1
Hawaii		–		–		5	–	6	–	0
Navy		–		–		5	–	6	–	0
West Virginia		–		–		5	–	6	–	0
South Carolina		–		–		5	–	7	–	0
Utah State		–		–		4	–	7	–	0
Villanova		–		–		4	–	7	–	0
Illinois State		–		–		3	–	7	–	1
Virginia Tech		–		–		3	–	7	–	1
Miami (FL)		–		–		3	–	8	–	0
Richmond		–		–		3	–	8	–	0
Tulane		–		–		3	–	8	–	0
Air Force		–		–		2	–	8	–	1
Holy Cross		–		–		2	–	8	–	0
Northeast Louisiana		–		–		2	–	9	–	0
North Texas State (originally 9–2) awarded a forfeit win after Mississippi State was found to be using an ineligible player.; Rankings from AP Poll

The 1977 Tennessee State Tigers football team represented Tennessee State University as an independent during the 1977 NCAA Division I football season. In their 15th year under head coach John Merritt, the team compiled an overall record of 8–1–1.

== Schedule ==
Date	Opponent	Site	Result	Attendance	Source
September 3	Middle Tennessee	Dudley Field; Nashville, TN	W 27–0	17,500	
September 10	at Jackson State	Mississippi Veterans Memorial Stadium; Jackson, MS	W 17–7		
September 17	at Alabama A&M	Milton Frank Stadium; Huntsville, AL	W 23–10		
September 24	Texas Southern	Hale Stadium; Nashville, TN	W 23–7		
October 1	Central State (OH)	Hale Stadium; Nashville, TN	W 17–0 (Note: Tennessee State was leading, 17–0, when Central State walked off the field and forfeited, 1–0.)		
October 8	Grambling State	Hale Stadium; Nashville, TN	W 26–8		
October 22	Florida A&M	Dudley Field; Nashville, TN	L 28–31	32,900–33,402	
October 29	at Southern	BREC Memorial Stadium; Baton Rouge, LA	W 15–7		
November 5	Tennessee–Martin^{†}	Hale Stadium; Nashville, TN	W 55–7	14,500	
November 12	at Chattanooga	Chamberlain Field; Chattanooga, TN	T 14–14		
^{†}Homecoming
