= 2009 Alcorn State Braves football team =

American college football season

2009 Alcorn State Braves football
- Conference: Southwestern Athletic Conference
- East Division
- Record: 3–6 (3–4 SWAC)
- Head coach: Earnest Collins Jr. (1st season)
- Home stadium: Jack Spinks Stadium

2009 Southwestern Athletic Conference football standings
	Conf.			Overall
Team	W		L	W		L
East Division
Alabama A&M xy	4	–	3	7	–	5
Alcorn State	3	–	4	3	–	6
Jackson State	3	–	4	3	–	7
Alabama State	1	–	6	4	–	7
Mississippi Valley State	1	–	6	3	–	8
West Division
No. 15 Prairie View A&M xy$	7	–	0	9	–	1
Grambling State	5	–	2	7	–	4
Texas Southern	5	–	2	6	–	5
Southern	3	–	4	6	–	6
Arkansas–Pine Bluff	3	–	4	5	–	5
Championship: Prairie View A&M 30, Alabama A&M 24
$ – Conference champion; x – Division champion/co-champions; y – Championship game participant; Rankings from The Sports Network Poll

The 2009 Alcorn State Braves football team represented Alcorn State University as a member of the Southwestern Athletic Conference (SWAC) during the 2009 NCAA Division I FCS football season. Led by first-year head coach Earnest Collins Jr., the Braves compiled an overall record of 3–6–1, with a conference record of 3–4–1, and finished tied for second in the SWAC East Division.

== Schedule ==
Date	Time	Opponent	Site	Result	Attendance	Source
September 5		at Southern Miss*	M. M. Roberts Stadium; Hattiesburg, MS	L 0–52	36,232	
September 19		at Central Michigan*	Kelly/Shorts Stadium; Mount Pleasant, MI	L 0–48	18,323	
September 26	6:00 p.m.	at Southern	A. W. Mumford Stadium; Baton Rouge, LA	L 42–48	16,940	
October 1		at Arkansas–Pine Bluff	Golden Lion Stadium; Pine Bluff, AR	Canceled (Note: Against Arkansas–Pine Bluff, the game was scoreless at halftime when play was suspended due to lightning. The game was not continued and subsequently canceled.)		
October 10		Mississippi Valley State	Jack Spinks Stadium; Lorman, MS	W 32–10	2,000	
October 17		Alabama A&M	Jack Spinks Stadium; Lorman, MS	W 34–16		
October 24		at Alabama State	Cramton Bowl; Montgomery, AL	L 17–24	2,631	
October 31		at Texas Southern	Delmar Stadium; Houston, TX	L 21–51		
November 14		No. 21 Prairie View A&M	Jack Spinks Stadium; Lorman, MS	L 14–34		
November 21		at Jackson State	Mississippi Veterans Memorial Stadium; Jackson, MS (Soul Bowl)	W 14–7	16,429	
*Non-conference game; Rankings from The Sports Network Poll released prior to the game; All times are in Central time
