= 2009 Jackson State Tigers football team =

American college football season

2009 Jackson State Tigers football
- Conference: Southwestern Athletic Conference
- East Division
- Record: 3–7 (3–4 SWAC)
- Head coach: Rick Comegy (4th season)
- Home stadium: Mississippi Veterans Memorial Stadium

2009 Southwestern Athletic Conference football standings
	Conf.			Overall
Team	W		L	W		L
East Division
Alabama A&M xy	4	–	3	7	–	5
Alcorn State	3	–	4	3	–	6
Jackson State	3	–	4	3	–	7
Alabama State	1	–	6	4	–	7
Mississippi Valley State	1	–	6	3	–	8
West Division
No. 15 Prairie View A&M xy$	7	–	0	9	–	1
Grambling State	5	–	2	7	–	4
Texas Southern	5	–	2	6	–	5
Southern	3	–	4	6	–	6
Arkansas–Pine Bluff	3	–	4	5	–	5
Championship: Prairie View A&M 30, Alabama A&M 24
$ – Conference champion; x – Division champion/co-champions; y – Championship game participant; Rankings from The Sports Network Poll

The 2009 Jackson State Tigers football team represented Jackson State University as a member of the Southwestern Athletic Conference (SWAC) during the 2009 NCAA Division I FCS football season. Led by fourth-year head coach Rick Comegy, the Tigers compiled an overall record of 3–7 and a mark of 3–4 in conference play, tying for second place in the SWAC East Division.

== Schedule ==
Date	Time	Opponent	Site	Result	Attendance	Source
September 5		at Mississippi State*	Davis Wade Stadium; Starkville, MS	L 7–45	54,232	
September 12		vs. Tennessee State*	Liberty Bowl Memorial Stadium; Memphis, TN (Southern Heritage Classic)	L 7–14	43,306	
September 19		Grambling State*	Mississippi Veterans Memorial Stadium; Jackson, MS	L 17–27	10,905	
October 3	6:00 p.m.	at Southern	A. W. Mumford Stadium; Baton Rouge, LA (rivalry)	W 22–14	33,977	
October 10		Arkansas–Pine Bluff	Mississippi Veterans Memorial Stadium; Jackson, MS	L 13–20 ^{OT}	11,082	
October 17		Texas Southern	Mississippi Veterans Memorial Stadium; Jackson, MS	L 17–19		
October 24		at Mississippi Valley State	Rice–Totten Stadium; Itta Bena, MS	W 25–16	4,025	
November 7		Alabama State	Mississippi Veterans Memorial Stadium; Jackson, MS	W 19–7	18,510	
November 14		at Alabama A&M	Louis Crews Stadium; Normal, AL	L 5–13		
November 21		Alcorn State	Mississippi Veterans Memorial Stadium; Jackson, MS (Soul Bowl)	L 7–14	16,429	
*Non-conference game; All times are in Central time
