= 1977 Alcorn State Braves football team =

American college football season

1977 Alcorn State Braves football
- Conference: Southwestern Athletic Conference
- Record: 3–8 (2–4 SWAC)
- Head coach: Marino Casem (14th season)
- Home stadium: Henderson Stadium

1977 Southwestern Athletic Conference football standings
	Conf.					Overall
Team	W		L		T	W		L		T
Grambling State $	6	–	0	–	0	10	–	1	–	0
Jackson State	5	–	1	–	0	8	–	3	–	0
Texas Southern	3	–	2	–	1	6	–	4	–	1
Mississippi Valley State	2	–	4	–	0	5	–	5	–	0
Alcorn State	2	–	4	–	0	3	–	8	–	0
Southern	1	–	4	–	1	3	–	7	–	1
Prairie View A&M	1	–	5	–	0	3	–	8	–	0
$ – Conference champion; The Conference was a hybrid of Division I and II programs. Mississippi Valley State and Prairie View A&M were classified as Division II. All the others were classified as Division I.

The 1977 Alcorn State Braves football team represented Alcorn State University as a member of the Southwestern Athletic Conference (SWAC) during the 1977 NCAA Division I football season. Led by 14th-year head coach Marino Casem, the Braves compiled an overall record of 3–8, with a conference record of 2–4, and finished tied for fourth in the SWAC.

== Schedule ==
Date	Opponent	Site	Result	Attendance	Source
September 3	at Central Michigan*	Perry Shorts Stadium; Mount Pleasant, MI	L 7–39	15,019	
September 10	Grambling State	Mississippi Veterans Memorial Stadium; Jackson, MS	L 17–42	18,406	
September 17	at Alabama State*	Cramton Bowl; Montgomery, AL	W 15–7		
September 24	vs. Florida A&M*	Milwaukee County Stadium; Milwaukee, WI (Midwest Gridiron Classic)	L 7–28	16,500–19,762	
October 1	South Carolina State*	Henderson Stadium; Lorman, MS	L 7–31	6,000	
October 8	at Texas Southern	Astrodome; Houston, TX	L 14–37		
October 22	at Southern	University Stadium; Baton Rouge, LA	W 23–0		
October 29	at Bishop*	P.C. Cobb Stadium; Dallas, TX	L 16–21		
November 5	Mississippi Valley State	Henderson Stadium; Lorman, MS	L 10–12		
November 12	Prairie View A&M	Henderson Stadium; Lorman, MS	W 31–12		
November 24	at Jackson State	Mississippi Veterans Memorial Stadium; Jackson, MS (rivalry)	L 16–23		
*Non-conference game
