= 2009 Arkansas–Pine Bluff Golden Lions football team =

American college football season

2009 Arkansas–Pine Bluff Golden Lions football
- Conference: Southwestern Athletic Conference
- West Division
- Record: 5–5 (3–4 SWAC)
- Head coach: Monte Coleman (2nd season)
- Home stadium: Golden Lion Stadium

2009 Southwestern Athletic Conference football standings
	Conf.			Overall
Team	W		L	W		L
East Division
Alabama A&M xy	4	–	3	7	–	5
Alcorn State	3	–	4	3	–	6
Jackson State	3	–	4	3	–	7
Alabama State	1	–	6	4	–	7
Mississippi Valley State	1	–	6	3	–	8
West Division
No. 15 Prairie View A&M xy$	7	–	0	9	–	1
Grambling State	5	–	2	7	–	4
Texas Southern	5	–	2	6	–	5
Southern	3	–	4	6	–	6
Arkansas–Pine Bluff	3	–	4	5	–	5
Championship: Prairie View A&M 30, Alabama A&M 24
$ – Conference champion; x – Division champion/co-champions; y – Championship game participant; Rankings from The Sports Network Poll

The 2009 Arkansas–Pine Bluff Golden Lions football team represented the University of Arkansas at Pine Bluff as a member of the Southwestern Athletic Conference (SWAC) during the 2009 NCAA Division I FCS football season. Led by second-year head coach Monte Coleman, the Golden Lions compiled an overall record of 5–5, with a mark of 3–4 in conference play, and finished tied for fourth in the SWAC West Division.

== Schedule ==
Date	Time	Opponent	Site	Result	Attendance	Source
September 5		Arkansas–Monticello*	Golden Lion Stadium; Pine Bluff, AR	L 7–23		
September 12		Langston*	Golden Lion Stadium; Pine Bluff, AR	W 45–30		
September 19		at Mississippi Valley State	Rice–Totten Stadium; Itta Bena, MS	W 27–7	2,200	
September 26		at Alabama A&M	Louis Crews Stadium; Normal, AL	L 7–28		
October 1		Alcorn State	Golden Lion Stadium; Pine Bluff, AR	Canceled (Note: Against Arkansas–Pine Bluff, the game was scoreless at halftime when play was suspended due to lightning. The game was not continued and subsequently canceled.)		
October 10		at Jackson State	Mississippi Veterans Memorial Stadium; Jackson, MS	W 20–13 ^{OT}	11,082	
October 24		Edward Waters*	Golden Lion Stadium; Pine Bluff, AR	W 38–12		
October 31	2:30 p.m.	at Southern	Golden Lion Stadium; Pine Bluff, AR	L 10–24	10,116	
November 7		vs. Grambling State	War Memorial Stadium; Little Rock, AR (Delta Classic)	W 49–42	26,712	
November 21		at No. 20 Prairie View A&M	Edward L. Blackshear Field; Prairie View, TX	L 17–49		
November 28		vs. Texas Southern	Cotton Bowl; Dallas, TX	L 10–14		
*Non-conference game; Rankings from The Sports Network Poll released prior to the game; All times are in Central time
