= 2009 Alabama State Hornets football team =

American college football season

2009 Alabama State Hornets football
- Conference: Southwestern Athletic Conference
- East Division
- Record: 4–7 (1–6 SWAC)
- Head coach: Reggie Barlow (3rd season)
- Home stadium: Cramton Bowl

2009 Southwestern Athletic Conference football standings
	Conf.			Overall
Team	W		L	W		L
East Division
Alabama A&M xy	4	–	3	7	–	5
Alcorn State	3	–	4	3	–	6
Jackson State	3	–	4	3	–	7
Alabama State	1	–	6	4	–	7
Mississippi Valley State	1	–	6	3	–	8
West Division
No. 15 Prairie View A&M xy$	7	–	0	9	–	1
Grambling State	5	–	2	7	–	4
Texas Southern	5	–	2	6	–	5
Southern	3	–	4	6	–	6
Arkansas–Pine Bluff	3	–	4	5	–	5
Championship: Prairie View A&M 30, Alabama A&M 24
$ – Conference champion; x – Division champion/co-champions; y – Championship game participant; Rankings from The Sports Network Poll

The 2009 Alabama State Hornets football team represented Alabama State University as a member of the Southwestern Athletic Conference (SWAC) during the 2009 NCAA Division I FCS football season. Led by third-year head coach Reggie Barlow, the Hornets compiled an overall record of 4–7, with a mark of 1–6 in conference play, and finished fourth in the SWAC East Division.

== Schedule ==
Date	Time	Opponent	Site	Result	Attendance	Source
September 5		Concordia (AL)*	Cramton Bowl; Montgomery, AL	W 38–33		
September 12		at Savannah State*	Ted Wright Stadium; Savannah, GA (Joe Turner Classic)	W 20–17	5,947	
September 19		Edward Waters*	Cramton Bowl; Montgomery, AL	W 38–6		
September 26		vs. Mississippi Valley State	Soldier Field; Chicago, IL (Chicago Football Classic)	L 3–10	46,000	
October 10		Prairie View A&M	Cramton Bowl; Montgomery, AL	L 10–24		
October 17		Grambling State	Cramton Bowl; Montgomery, AL	L 12–23	7,854	
October 24		Alcorn State	Cramton Bowl; Montgomery, AL	W 24–17		
October 31		vs. Alabama A&M	Legion Field; Birmingham, AL (Magic City Classic)	L 7–21	55,322	
November 7		at Jackson State	Mississippi Veterans Memorial Stadium; Jackson, MS	L 7–19		
November 14	2:30 p.m.	vs. Southern	Ladd–Peebles Stadium; Mobile, AL (Gulf Coast Classic)	L 24–34	8,459	
November 26		Tuskegee*	Cramton Bowl; Montgomery, AL (Turkey Day Classic)	L 0–21		
*Non-conference game; All times are in Central time
