= 1977 Jackson State Tigers football team =

American college football season

1977 Jackson State Tigers football
- Conference: Southwestern Athletic Conference
- Record: 8–3 (5–1 SWAC)
- Head coach: W. C. Gorden (2nd season)
- Home stadium: Mississippi Veterans Memorial Stadium

1977 Southwestern Athletic Conference football standings
	Conf.					Overall
Team	W		L		T	W		L		T
Grambling State $	6	–	0	–	0	10	–	1	–	0
Jackson State	5	–	1	–	0	8	–	3	–	0
Texas Southern	3	–	2	–	1	6	–	4	–	1
Mississippi Valley State	2	–	4	–	0	5	–	5	–	0
Alcorn State	2	–	4	–	0	3	–	8	–	0
Southern	1	–	4	–	1	3	–	7	–	1
Prairie View A&M	1	–	5	–	0	3	–	8	–	0
$ – Conference champion; The Conference was a hybrid of Division I and II programs. Mississippi Valley State and Prairie View A&M were classified as Division II. All the others were classified as Division I.

The 1977 Jackson State Tigers football team represented the Jackson State University during the 1977 NCAA Division I football season as a member of the Southwestern Athletic Conference (SWAC). Led by second-year head coach W. C. Gorden, the Tigers compiled an overall record of 8–3 and a mark of 5–1 in conference play, placing second in the SWAC. It was their first season as a member of Division I.

== Schedule ==
Date	Opponent	Site	Result	Attendance	Source
September 3	Alabama State*	Mississippi Veterans Memorial Stadium; Jackson, MS	W 17–6		
September 10	Tennessee State*	Mississippi Veterans Memorial Stadium; Jackson, MS	L 7–17		
September 17	at Prairie View A&M	Edward L. Blackshear Field; Prairie View, TX	W 27–2		
September 24	at Mississippi Valley State	Magnolia Stadium; Itta Bena, MS	W 37–13		
October 8	at Arkansas–Pine Bluff*	Pine Bluff, AR	W 31–0		
October 15	Southern	Mississippi Veterans Memorial Stadium; Jackson, MS (rivalry)	W 38–0		
October 22	Grambling State	Mississippi Veterans Memorial Stadium; Jackson, MS	L 7–34		
October 29	vs. Bethune–Cookman*	Miami Orange Bowl; Miami, FL	L 3–10	12,500	
November 5	at Texas Southern	Astrodome; Houston, TX	W 10–0		
November 12	Morgan State*	Mississippi Veterans Memorial Stadium; Jackson, MS	W 31–14		
November 24	Alcorn State*	Mississippi Veterans Memorial Stadium; Jackson, MS (rivalry)	W 23–16		
*Non-conference game
