= 1977 Southern Jaguars football team =

American college football season

1977 Southern Jaguars football
- Conference: Southwestern Athletic Conference
- Record: 3–7–1 (1–4–1 SWAC)
- Head coach: Charles Bates (6th season; first 7 games); Ken Tillage (interim, games 8–11)
- Home stadium: University Stadium; BREC Memorial Stadium

1977 Southwestern Athletic Conference football standings
	Conf.					Overall
Team	W		L		T	W		L		T
Grambling State $	6	–	0	–	0	10	–	1	–	0
Jackson State	5	–	1	–	0	8	–	3	–	0
Texas Southern	3	–	2	–	1	6	–	4	–	1
Mississippi Valley State	2	–	4	–	0	5	–	5	–	0
Alcorn State	2	–	4	–	0	3	–	8	–	0
Southern	1	–	4	–	1	3	–	7	–	1
Prairie View A&M	1	–	5	–	0	3	–	8	–	0
$ – Conference champion; The Conference was a hybrid of Division I and II programs. Mississippi Valley State and Prairie View A&M were classified as Division II. All the others were classified as Division I.

The 1977 Southern Jaguars football team represented Southern University as a member of the Southwestern Athletic Conference (SWAC) during the 1977 NCAA Division I football season. The Jaguars compiled an overall record of 3–7–1, with a conference record of 1–4–1, and finished sixth in the SWAC.

After their loss to Alcorn State, sixth-year head coach Charles Bates resigned with a record of 3–3–1. He was replaced with interim head coach Ken Tillage who finished the season with an 0–4 record.

== Schedule ==
Date	Opponent	Site	Result	Attendance	Source
September 10	Tuskegee*	University Stadium; Baton Rouge, LA	W 13–7		
September 17	Texas Southern	BREC Memorial Stadium; Baton Rouge, LA	T 14–14		
September 24	at Prairie View A&M	Rice Stadium; Houston, TX	W 46–6		
October 1	at Mississippi Valley State	Magnolia Stadium; Itta Bena, MS	L 13–35		
October 8	Bishop*	University Stadium; Baton Rouge, LA	W 28–3		
October 15	at Jackson State	Mississippi Veterans Memorial Stadium; Jackson, MS (rivalry)	L 0–38		
October 22	Alcorn State^{†}	University Stadium; Baton Rouge, LA	L 0–23		
October 29	Tennessee State*	BREC Memorial Stadium; Baton Rouge, LA	L 7–15		
November 5	at Howard*	Robert F. Kennedy Memorial Stadium; Washington, DC	L 16–26	6,000	
November 12	vs. Florida A&M*	Tampa Stadium; Tampa, FL	L 6–19		
November 26	vs. Grambling State	Louisiana Superdome; New Orleans, LA (Bayou Classic)	L 20–55	76,000	
*Non-conference game; ^{†}Homecoming
