= 1977 Mississippi Valley State Delta Devils football team =

American college football season

1977 Mississippi Valley State Delta Devils football
- Conference: Southwestern Athletic Conference
- Record: 5–5 (2–4 SWAC)
- Head coach: Davis Weathersby (8th season)
- Home stadium: Magnolia Stadium

1977 Southwestern Athletic Conference football standings
	Conf.					Overall
Team	W		L		T	W		L		T
Grambling State $	6	–	0	–	0	10	–	1	–	0
Jackson State	5	–	1	–	0	8	–	3	–	0
Texas Southern	3	–	2	–	1	6	–	4	–	1
Mississippi Valley State	2	–	4	–	0	5	–	5	–	0
Alcorn State	2	–	4	–	0	3	–	8	–	0
Southern	1	–	4	–	1	3	–	7	–	1
Prairie View A&M	1	–	5	–	0	3	–	8	–	0
$ – Conference champion; The Conference was a hybrid of Division I and II programs. Mississippi Valley State and Prairie View A&M were classified as Division II. All the others were classified as Division I.

The 1977 Mississippi Valley State Delta Devils football team represented Mississippi Valley State University as a member of the Southwestern Athletic Conference (SWAC) during the 1977 NCAA Division II football season. Led by eighth-year head coach Davis Weathersby, the Delta Devils compiled an overall record of 5–5, with a conference record of 2–4, and finished tied for fourth in the SWAC.

== Schedule ==
Date	Opponent	Site	Result	Source
September 3	Bishop*	Magnolia Stadium; Itta Bena, MS	W 27–10	
September 10	Lincoln (MO)*	Magnolia Stadium; Itta Bena, MS	W 55–0	
September 17	Arkansas–Pine Bluff*	Magnolia Stadium; Itta Bena, MS	W 12–9	
September 24	Jackson State	Magnolia Stadium; Itta Bena, MS	L 13–37	
October 1	Southern	Magnolia Stadium; Itta Bena, MS	W 35–13	
October 8	at Langston*	Langston, OK	L 8–34	
October 15	at Grambling State	Grambling Stadium; Grambling, LA	L 21–42	
October 22	Texas Southern	Magnolia Stadium; Itta Bena, MS	L 33–35	
October 29	at Prairie View A&M	Edward L. Blackshear Field; Prairie View, TX	L 0–3	
November 5	at Alcorn State	Henderson Stadium; Lorman, MS	W 12–10	
*Non-conference game
