= 2009 Southern Jaguars football team =

American college football season

2009 Southern Jaguars football
- Conference: Southwestern Athletic Conference
- West Division
- Record: 0–5 (0–4 SWAC)
- Head coach: Pete Richardson (17th season)
- Defensive coordinator: Terrence Graves (6th season)
- Home stadium: A. W. Mumford Stadium

2009 Southwestern Athletic Conference football standings
	Conf.			Overall
Team	W		L	W		L
East Division
Alabama A&M xy	4	–	3	7	–	5
Alcorn State	3	–	4	3	–	6
Jackson State	3	–	4	3	–	7
Alabama State	1	–	6	4	–	7
Mississippi Valley State	1	–	6	3	–	8
West Division
No. 15 Prairie View A&M xy$	7	–	0	9	–	1
Grambling State	5	–	2	7	–	4
Texas Southern	5	–	2	6	–	5
Southern	3	–	4	6	–	6
Arkansas–Pine Bluff	3	–	4	5	–	5
Championship: Prairie View A&M 30, Alabama A&M 24
$ – Conference champion; x – Division champion/co-champions; y – Championship game participant; Rankings from The Sports Network Poll

The 2009 Southern Jaguars football team represented Southern University as a member of the Southwestern Athletic Conference (SWAC) during the 2009 NCAA Division I FCS football season. Led by 17th-year head coach Pete Richardson, the Jaguars compiled an overall record of 6–5, with a conference record of 3–4, and finished and finished tied for fourth in the SWAC West Division. The Jaguars subsequently had all wins from this season vacated as a penalty for NCAA violations.

== Schedule ==
Date	Time	Opponent	Site	Result	Attendance	Source
September 5	6:00 p.m.	at Louisiana–Lafayette*	Cajun Field; Lafayette, LA	L 19–42	41,357	
September 12	6:00 p.m.	Central State*	A. W. Mumford Stadium; Baton Rouge, LA	W 68–0 (vacated)	8,937	
September 19	6:00 p.m.	Tennessee State*	A. W. Mumford Stadium; Baton Rouge, LA	W 21–17 (vacated)	12,247	
September 26	6:00 p.m.	Alcorn State	A. W. Mumford Stadium; Baton Rouge, LA	W 48–42 (vacated)	16,940	
October 3	6:00 p.m.	Jackson State	A. W. Mumford Stadium; Baton Rouge, LA (rivalry)	L 14–22	33,977	
October 17	5:30 p.m.	Fort Valley State*^{†}	A. W. Mumford Stadium; Baton Rouge, LA	W 55–23 (vacated)	24,500	
October 22	6:30 p.m.	Prairie View A&M	A. W. Mumford Stadium; Baton Rouge, LA	L 14–16	6,463	
October 31	2:30 p.m.	at Arkansas–Pine Bluff	Golden Lion Stadium; Pine Bluff, AR	W 24–10 (vacated)	10,116	
November 14	2:30 p.m.	vs. Alabama State	Ladd–Peebles Stadium; Mobile, AL (Gulf Coast Classic)	W 34–24 (vacated)	8,459	
November 28	1:00 p.m.	vs. Grambling State	Louisiana Superdome; New Orleans, LA (Bayou Classic)	L 13–31	53,618	
December 5	1:00 p.m.	at Texas Southern	Delmar Stadium; Houston, TX	L 25–30	10,769	
*Non-conference game; ^{†}Homecoming; All times are in Central time
