= 2009 Grambling State Tigers football team =

American college football season

2009 Grambling State Tigers football
- Conference: Southwestern Athletic Conference
- West Division
- Record: 7–4 (5–2 SWAC)
- Head coach: Rod Broadway (3rd season)
- Offensive scheme: Spread option
- Defensive coordinator: Cliff Yoshida (3rd season)
- Base defense: 3–4
- Home stadium: Eddie G. Robinson Memorial Stadium

2009 Southwestern Athletic Conference football standings
	Conf.			Overall
Team	W		L	W		L
East Division
Alabama A&M xy	4	–	3	7	–	5
Alcorn State	3	–	4	3	–	6
Jackson State	3	–	4	3	–	7
Alabama State	1	–	6	4	–	7
Mississippi Valley State	1	–	6	3	–	8
West Division
No. 15 Prairie View A&M xy$	7	–	0	9	–	1
Grambling State	5	–	2	7	–	4
Texas Southern	5	–	2	6	–	5
Southern	3	–	4	6	–	6
Arkansas–Pine Bluff	3	–	4	5	–	5
Championship: Prairie View A&M 30, Alabama A&M 24
$ – Conference champion; x – Division champion/co-champions; y – Championship game participant; Rankings from The Sports Network Poll

The 2009 Grambling State Tigers football team represented Grambling State University as a member of the Southwestern Athletic Conference (SWAC) during the 2009 NCAA Division I FCS football season. Led by third-year head coach Rod Broadway, the Tigers compiled an overall record of 7–4 and a mark of 5–2 in conference play, and finished tied for second in the SWAC West Division.

== Schedule ==
Date	Time	Opponent	Rank	Site	Result	Attendance	Source
September 6		vs. No. 16 South Carolina State*	No. T–25	Florida Citrus Bowl; Orlando, FL (MEAC/SWAC Challenge)	L 31–34	21,367	
September 12		Northwestern State*		Eddie G. Robinson Memorial Stadium; Grambling, LA	W 38–17		
September 19		at Jackson State*		Mississippi Veterans Memorial Stadium; Jackson, MS	W 27–17	10,905	
September 26		at No. 16 (FBS) Oklahoma State*		Boone Pickens Stadium; Stillwater, OK	L 6–56	56,901	
October 3		vs. Prairie View A&M		Cotton Bowl; Dallas, TX (State Fair Classic)	L 32–35	9,647	
October 10		Alabama A&M		Eddie G. Robinson Memorial Stadium; Grambling, LA	W 41–20		
October 17		at Alabama State		Cramton Bowl; Montgomery, AL	W 23–12	7,854	
October 31		Mississippi Valley State		Eddie G. Robinson Memorial Stadium; Grambling, LA	W 50–7	10,425	
November 7		at Arkansas–Pine Bluff		War Memorial Stadium; Little Rock, AR (Delta Classic)	L 42–49	26,712	
November 12		Texas Southern		Eddie G. Robinson Memorial Stadium; Grambling, LA	W 49–33		
November 28	1:00 p.m.	vs. Southern		Louisiana Superdome; New Orleans, LA (Bayou Classic)	W 31–13	53,618	
*Non-conference game; Rankings from The Sports Network Poll released prior to the game; All times are in Central time
