= 1977 Texas Southern Tigers football team =

American college football season

1977 Texas Southern Tigers football
- Conference: Southwestern Athletic Conference
- Record: 6–4–1 (3–2–1 SWAC)
- Head coach: Wendell Mosley (2nd season)
- Home stadium: Astrodome; Jeppesen Stadium

1977 Southwestern Athletic Conference football standings
	Conf.					Overall
Team	W		L		T	W		L		T
Grambling State $	6	–	0	–	0	10	–	1	–	0
Jackson State	5	–	1	–	0	8	–	3	–	0
Texas Southern	3	–	2	–	1	6	–	4	–	1
Mississippi Valley State	2	–	4	–	0	5	–	5	–	0
Alcorn State	2	–	4	–	0	3	–	8	–	0
Southern	1	–	4	–	1	3	–	7	–	1
Prairie View A&M	1	–	5	–	0	3	–	8	–	0
$ – Conference champion; The Conference was a hybrid of Division I and II programs. Mississippi Valley State and Prairie View A&M were classified as Division II. All the others were classified as Division I.

The 1977 Texas Southern Tigers football team was an American football team that represented Texas Southern University as a member of the Southwestern Athletic Conference (SWAC) during the 1977 NCAA Division I football season. Led by second-year head coach Wendell Mosley, the Tigers compiled an overall record of 6–4–1, with a mark of 3–2–1 in conference play, and finished third in the SWAC.

== Schedule ==
Date	Opponent	Site	Result	Source
September 10	Bethune–Cookman*	Astrodome; Houston, TX	W 14–0	
September 17	at Southern	BREC Memorial Stadium; Baton Rouge, LA	T 14–14	
September 24	at Tennessee State*	Hale Stadium; Nashville, TN	L 7–23	
October 1	vs. Texas A&I*	Northside Stadium; San Antonio, TX	L 13–28	
October 8	Alcorn State	Astrodome; Houston, TX	W 37–14	
October 15	at Bishop*	Sprague Field; Dallas, TX	W 44–0	
October 22	at Mississippi Valley State	Magnolia Stadium; Itta Bena, MS	W 35–33	
October 29	Grambling State	Astrodome; Houston, TX	L 14–28	
November 5	Jackson State	Astrodome; Houston, TX	L 0–10	
November 12	Langston*	Astrodome; Houston, TX	W 85–13	
November 19	Prairie View A&M	Jeppesen Stadium; Houston, TX (rivalry)	W 29–28	
*Non-conference game
