= 2009 Mississippi Valley State Delta Devils football team =

American college football season

2009 Mississippi Valley State Delta Devils football
- Conference: Southwestern Athletic Conference
- East Division
- Record: 3–8 (1–6 SWAC)
- Head coach: Willie Totten (8th season)
- Home stadium: Rice–Totten Stadium

2009 Southwestern Athletic Conference football standings
	Conf.			Overall
Team	W		L	W		L
East Division
Alabama A&M xy	4	–	3	7	–	5
Alcorn State	3	–	4	3	–	6
Jackson State	3	–	4	3	–	7
Alabama State	1	–	6	4	–	7
Mississippi Valley State	1	–	6	3	–	8
West Division
No. 15 Prairie View A&M xy$	7	–	0	9	–	1
Grambling State	5	–	2	7	–	4
Texas Southern	5	–	2	6	–	5
Southern	3	–	4	6	–	6
Arkansas–Pine Bluff	3	–	4	5	–	5
Championship: Prairie View A&M 30, Alabama A&M 24
$ – Conference champion; x – Division champion/co-champions; y – Championship game participant; Rankings from The Sports Network Poll

The 2009 Mississippi Valley State Delta Devils football team represented Mississippi Valley State University as a member of the Southwestern Athletic Conference (SWAC) during the 2009 NCAA Division I FCS football season. Led by eighth-year head coach Willie Totten, the Delta Devils compiled an overall record of 3–8 and a mark of 1–6 in conference play, tying for fourth place in the SWAC East Division. Coach Totten resigned after the end of the season, the Delta Devils' third straight three-win season.

== Schedule ==
Date	Opponent	Site	Result	Attendance	Source
September 5	at Arkansas State*	ASU Stadium; Jonesboro, AR	L 0–61	21,056	
September 19	Arkansas–Pine Bluff	Rice–Totten Stadium; Itta Bena, MS	L 7–27	2,200	
September 26	vs. Alabama State*	Soldier Field; Chicago, IL (Chicago Football Classic)	W 10–3	46,000	
October 3	Texas College*	Rice–Totten Stadium; Itta Bena, MS	W 61–6	2,670	
October 10	at Alcorn State	Jack Spinks Stadium; Lorman, MS	L 10–32	2,000	
October 17	at Prairie View A&M	Edward L. Blackshear Field; Prairie View, TX	L 0–38	10,000	
October 24	Jackson State	Rice–Totten Stadium; Itta Bena, MS	L 16–25	4,025	
October 31	at Grambling State	Eddie G. Robinson Memorial Stadium; Grambling, LA	L 7–50	10,425	
November 7	Texas Southern	Rice–Totten Stadium; Itta Bena, MS	L 7–30	1,487	
November 14	Lincoln (MO)*	Rice–Totten Stadium; Itta Bena, MS	W 16–6	503	
November 21	at Alabama A&M	Louis Crews Stadium; Normal, AL	L 12–17	2,776	
*Non-conference game
