= 1977 Grambling State Tigers football team =

American college football season

1977 Grambling State Tigers football

Black national champion SWAC champion Mirage Bowl champion

Mirage Bowl, W 35–32 vs. Temple
- Conference: Southwestern Athletic Conference
- Record: 10–1 (6–0 SWAC)
- Head coach: Eddie Robinson (35th season)
- Home stadium: Grambling Stadium

1977 Southwestern Athletic Conference football standings
	Conf.					Overall
Team	W		L		T	W		L		T
Grambling State $	6	–	0	–	0	10	–	1	–	0
Jackson State	5	–	1	–	0	8	–	3	–	0
Texas Southern	3	–	2	–	1	6	–	4	–	1
Mississippi Valley State	2	–	4	–	0	5	–	5	–	0
Alcorn State	2	–	4	–	0	3	–	8	–	0
Southern	1	–	4	–	1	3	–	7	–	1
Prairie View A&M	1	–	5	–	0	3	–	8	–	0
$ – Conference champion; The Conference was a hybrid of Division I and II programs. Mississippi Valley State and Prairie View A&M were classified as Division II. All the others were classified as Division I.

The 1977 Grambling State Tigers football team represented Grambling State University as a member of the Southwestern Athletic Conference (SWAC) during the 1977 NCAA Division I football season. The Tigers were led by head coach Eddie Robinson in his 35th year and finished the season with a record of ten wins and one loss (10–1, 6–0 SWAC), as SWAC champions, black college football national champions and with a victory over Temple in the Mirage Bowl. The Tigers offense scored 462 points while the defense allowed 175 points.

== Schedule ==
Date	Opponent	Site	Result	Attendance	Source
September 10	at Alcorn State	Mississippi Veterans Memorial Stadium; Jackson, MS	W 42–17	18,406	
September 17	vs. Morgan State*	Yankee Stadium; Bronx, NY	W 35–19	34,403	
October 1	Prairie View A&M	Grambling Stadium; Grambling, LA (rivalry)	W 70–7		
October 8	at Tennessee State*	Hale Stadium; Nashville, TN	L 8–26		
October 15	Mississippi Valley State	Grambling Stadium; Grambling, LA	W 42–21		
October 22	at Jackson State	Mississippi Veterans Memorial Stadium; Jackson, MS	W 34–7		
October 29	at Texas Southern	Houston Astrodome; Houston, TX	W 28–14	53,668	
November 5	Langston*	Grambling Stadium; Grambling, LA	W 65–0	14,500	
November 12	at Norfolk State*	Foreman Field; Norfolk, VA	W 48–12	18,500	
November 26	vs. Southern	Louisiana Superdome; New Orleans, LA (Bayou Classic)	W 55–20	76,000	
December 11	vs. Temple*	Korakuen Stadium; Tokyo, Japan (Mirage Bowl)	W 35–32	50,000	
*Non-conference game

== Team players drafted into the NFL ==
Player	Position	Round	Pick	NFL club
Doug Williams	Quarterback	1	17	Tampa Bay Buccaneers
Carlos Pennywell	Wide receiver	3	77	Tampa Bay Buccaneers
Robert Woods	Tackle	5	134	Kansas City Chiefs
