= Prairie View A&M Panthers football =

College football team

| 2026 Prairie View A&M Panthers football team |
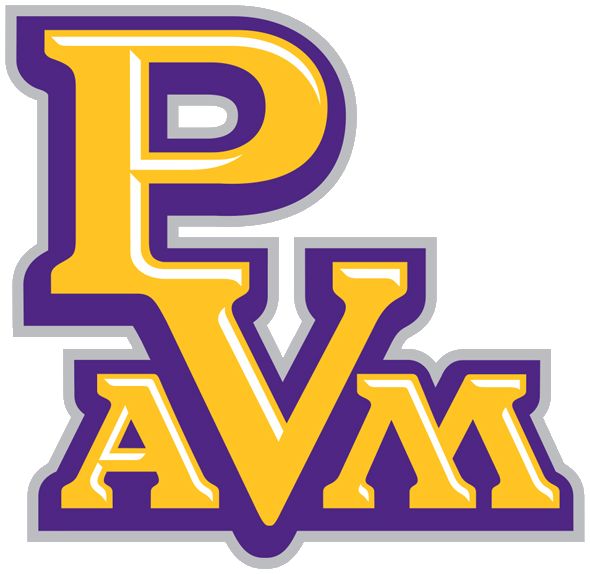
- First season: 1907; 119 years ago
- Athletic director: Anton Goff
- Head coach: Tremaine Jackson; 2nd season, 10–3 (.769)
- Location: Prairie View, Texas
- Stadium: Panther Stadium at Blackshear Field (capacity: 15,000, Expandable to 30,000)
- Conference: SWAC
- Division: West
- Colors: Purple and gold
- All-time record: 600–544–34 (.524)
- Bowl record: 24–25–1 (.490)

Black college national championships
- 1953, 1954, 1958, 1963, 1964, 2009

Conference championships
- SWAC: 1931, 1933, 1951, 1952, 1953, 1954, 1958, 1960, 1963, 1964, 2009, 2025

Division championships
- SWAC West: 2009, 2021, 2022, 2023, 2025, 2026
- Rivalries: Grambling State (rivalry); Texas Southern (rivalry)
- Fight song: "Cheer for Prairie View"
- Mascot: Panthers
- Marching band: "The Marching Storm"
- Website: pvpanthers.com

The Prairie View A&M Panthers football team is the college football team representing the Prairie View A&M University. The Panthers play in NCAA Division I Football Championship Subdivision (FCS) as a member of the Southwestern Athletic Conference (SWAC).

== History ==
The first football coach at Prairie View was Henry B. Hucles, who began in 1924. Before Hucles's arrival at Prairie View, the school played two games without a coach on record: a 1907 7–0 win against a team from Wylie, Texas and a 1920 7–6 loss to Tuskegee University.

Prairie View's most recognized and celebrated coach was Billy Nicks. Known as the "Bear Bryant" of black college football, Nicks was head coach from 1945 to 1947, assistant coach from 1948 to 1951, and head coach again from 1952 to 1965. His record for 17 years was 127–39–8. He led the Panthers to eight Southwestern Athletic Conference championships and five black college national championships. At the Panthers' peak under Nicks, Eddie Robinson was said to dread playing Prairie View.

Nicks was inducted into the College Football Hall of Fame in 1999. Nicks was named the American Football Coaches Association’s recipient of the Trailblazer Award. The award was presented posthumously at the AFCA Kickoff Luncheon on Monday, January 7 at the 2008 AFCA Convention in Anaheim, California.

Prairie View is recognized as the first historically Black university to create and play in a post-season bowl game. The Prairie View Bowl was played in Texas from 1929 through 1961.

The Panthers won Black college football national championship titles in 1953, 1954, 1958, 1963, 1964, 2009 and Southwestern Athletic Conference Championships SWAC in 1933, 1951, 1952, 1953, 1954, 1958, 1960, 1963, 1964, 2009 and recently in 2025. Notable football players that have achieved success in the National Football League (NFL) are National Football Hall of Fame Inductee Ken Houston, who played for the Houston Oilers and Washington Redskins and Otis Taylor, who won a World Championship with the Kansas City Chiefs in 1969. On a small note of significance, Charlie "Choo Choo" Brackins, who played from 1952 to 1955, was the first HBCU alumnus to play quarterback in the NFL.

The end of Jim Crow caused a significant talent drain for all HBCUs. Nicks had been able to stem the tide somewhat by persuading many of the state's black high school coaches to continue sending their players to Prairie View rather than to a predominantly white school. At one point, nearly all of them had played for Nicks — a legacy of the days when Nicks had the pick of every good black player in Texas — and owed their jobs to him. Usually, a single phone call from Nicks was enough to persuade one of Nicks' former players to send a prospect to "The Hill." He wasn't above threatening to have them fired if they didn't do so.

However, Prairie View's fortunes sank rapidly after Nicks retired in 1965. The Panthers would only "officially" finish above .500 twice from 1968 to 1989. This included winless seasons in 1974, 1979, 1983, and 1984 and a 28-game losing streak from 1982 to 1985. They managed a .500 record in 1988 under coach Haney Catchings—their first non-losing season since 1976. However, that win was forfeited after the season due to an ineligible player.

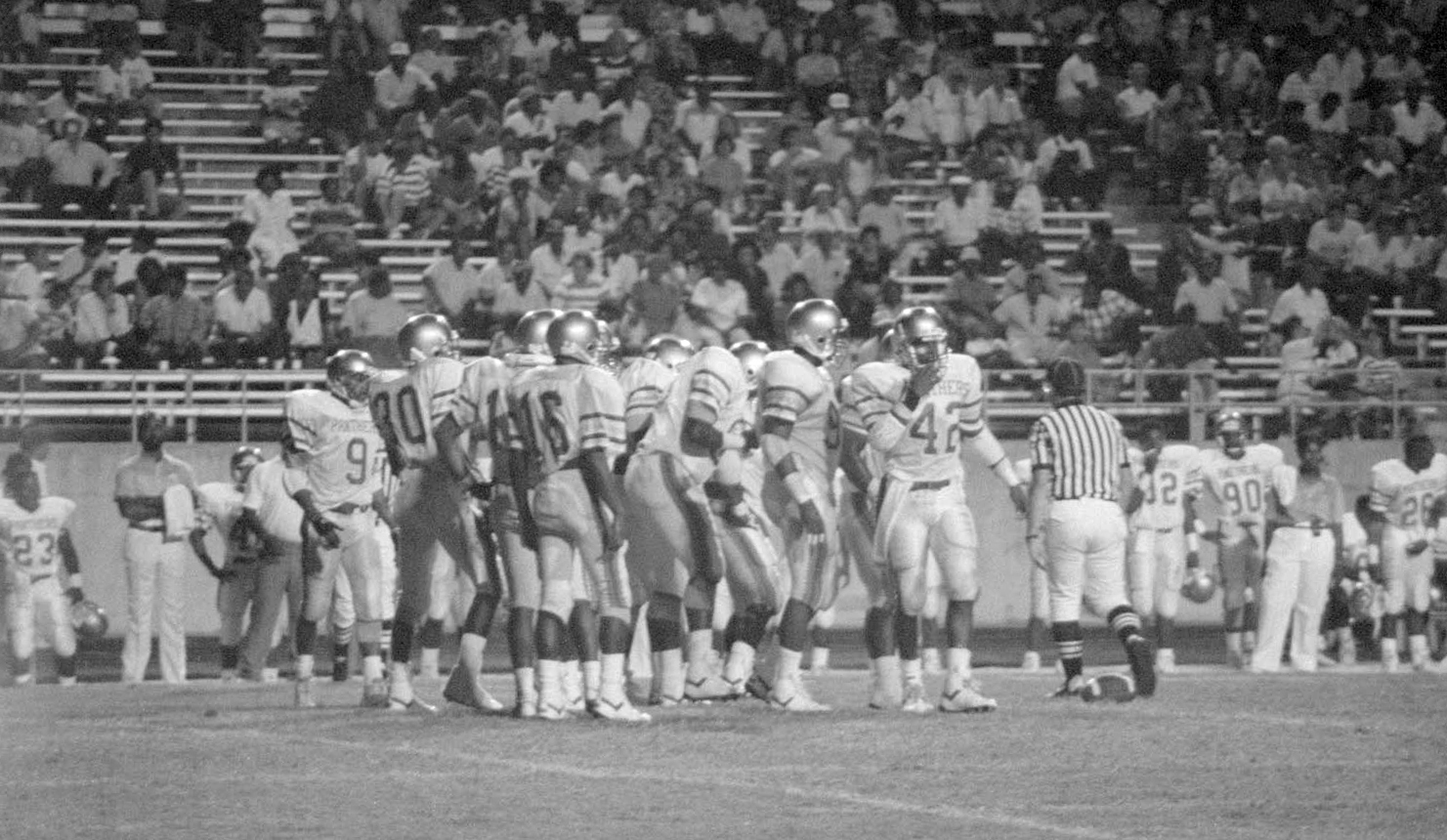
Prairie View A&M football versus Texas State in 1989

It initially appeared that the nadir had been reached in 1989. Several players accused Catchings of withholding their financial aid until they proved themselves on the field. At one point, only 12 players had GPAs above 2.0. When the administration was slow to act, the players boycotted the program. The boycott finally ended, but the Panthers finished 1–9.

In May 1990, Prairie View shuttered all sports except track and field due to severe financial problems. A month later, the Houston Chronicle discovered that the athletic department account was short $100,000. Eventually, Catchings was charged with filing fraudulent expense reports. He pleaded guilty and was sentenced to five years' probation and over $1,500 in fines and restitution.

Prairie View bottomed out when it returned to the field for the 1991 season. The team did not have any scholarships because only 150 alumni responded to a request to help raise a scholarship fund. Due to this and other handicaps, new coach Ronald Beard found himself leading what he later described as an "intramural or club football" team at the I-AA level. The Panthers did not win a single game until 1998. The 80 consecutive losses spanning parts of nine seasons (including two losses to close the 1989 season) almost doubled Columbia University's 44 straight losses between 1983 and 1988.

The streak finally ended with a 14–12 victory over Langston on September 26, 1998. However, that team only had 15 scholarship players. The road back was difficult; the Panthers only won a total of 23 games between 1998 and 2006.

On November 10, 2007, Prairie View clinched its first "official" winning season since 1976, and only their second since 1967, with a 30–27 victory over traditional power Jackson State University under then head coach Henry Frazier, III.

In 1999 the SWAC moved to a new divisional format with Western Division and Eastern Division champions to play for the SWAC Championship. On November 14, 2009, Prairie View clinched its first SWAC Western Division Championship by defeating Alcorn State. The next weekend would see the Panthers go undefeated in the SWAC by defeating Arkansas Pine Bluff and securing an 8–1 record; their only loss during the season was to New Mexico State. They finished the season by winning the SWAC Championship on December 12, defeating Eastern Division Champion Alabama A&M, 30–24, in the SWAC Championship Game. They exited the 2009 SWAC football campaign with an unblemished 9–0 SWAC conference record. They were led by their quarterback, 6 ft 4 in, 225-pound KJ Black, who led all quarterbacks in the SWAC with a passer efficiency rating of 168.1, and SWAC second-leading rusher Donald Babers averaged 5.2 yards per carry.

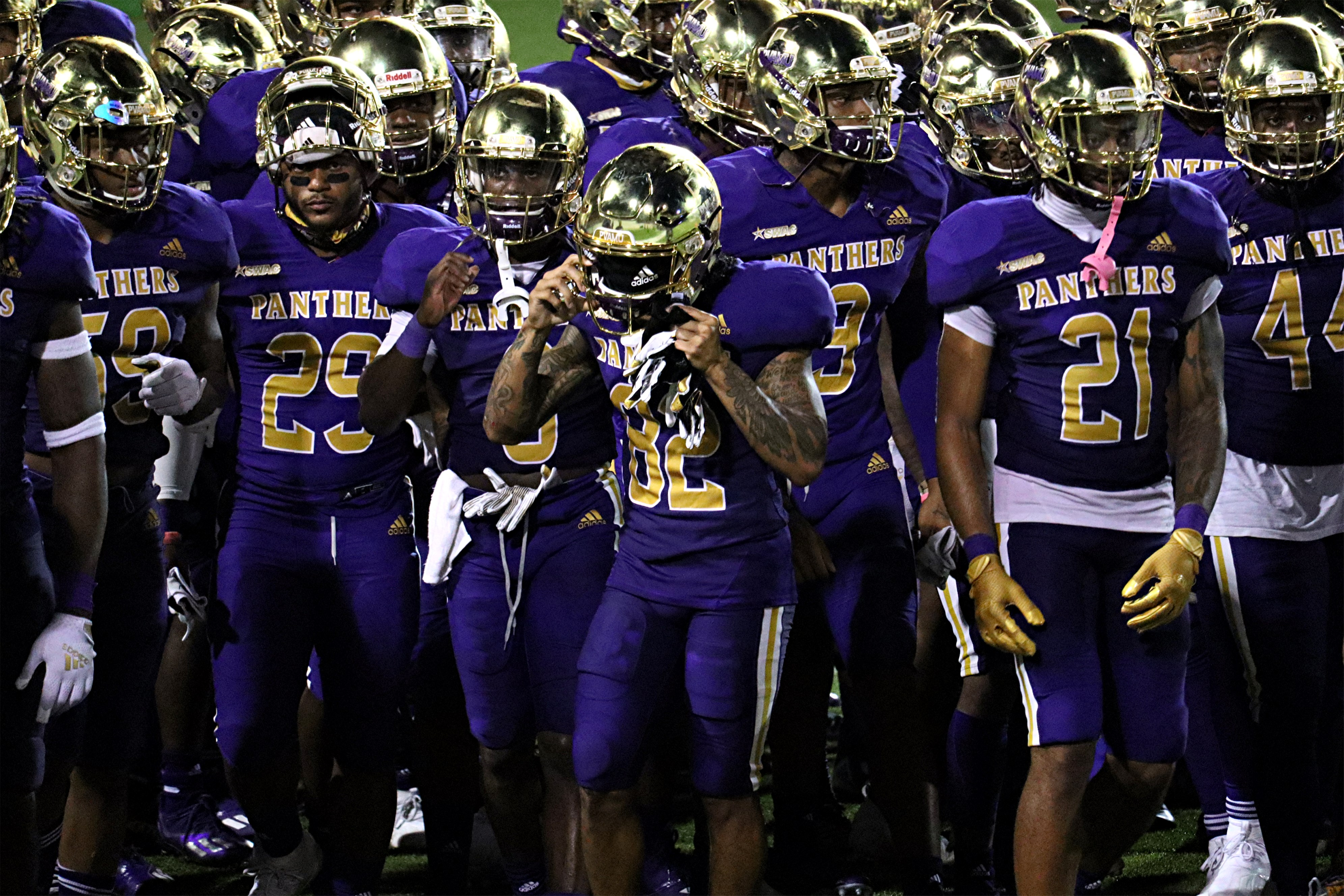
Panthers football players in 2021

== Playoff appearances ==
=== NAIA ===
The Panthers appeared in the NAIA playoffs one time. Their combined record was 1–1.

| Year | Round | Opponent | Result |
|---|---|---|---|
| 1963 | Semifinals; National Championship | Kearney State; Saint John's (MN) | W, 20–7; L, 27–33 |

== Affiliations ==
=== Classifications ===
- 1951–1972: NCAA College Division
- 1952–1969: NAIA
- 1970–1977: NCAA Division II
- 1978–present: NCAA Division I–AA(Now FCS)

=== Conference memberships ===
- 1907–1922: Independent
- 1923–present: Southwestern Athletic Conference

== Championships ==
=== Black college football national championships ===
| Year | Coach | National Championship Selectors | Record |
|---|---|---|---|
| 1953 | Billy Nicks | Atlanta Daily World, Associated Negro Press, Pittsburgh Courier | 12–0 |
| 1954 | Billy Nicks | Atlanta Daily World, Pittsburgh Courier | 10–1 |
| 1958 | Billy Nicks | Atlanta Daily World, Associated Negro Press, Pittsburgh Courier | 10–0–1 |
| 1963 | Billy Nicks | Atlanta Daily World, Pittsburgh Courier | 10–1 |
| 1964 | Billy Nicks | Atlanta Daily World, Pittsburgh Courier | 9–0 |
| 2009 | Henry Frazier III | American Sports Wire, Black College Sports Page | 9–1 |

=== Conference championships ===
Prairie View A&M has won 12 conference championships, all in the Southwestern Athletic Conference (SWAC). Ten were won outright and two shared.

| Season | Conference | Coach | Overall record | Conference record |
|---|---|---|---|---|
| 1931 | Southwestern Athletic Conference | Sam B. Taylor | 9–0–1 | 6–0–1 |
| 1933† | Southwestern Athletic Conference | Sam B. Taylor | 7–1 | 5–1 |
| 1951 | Southwestern Athletic Conference | James A. Stevens | 9–1 | 6–1 |
| 1952 | Southwestern Athletic Conference | Billy Nicks | 7–2 | 6–0 |
| 1953 | Southwestern Athletic Conference | Billy Nicks | 12–0 | 6–0 |
| 1954 | Southwestern Athletic Conference | Billy Nicks | 10–1 | 6–0 |
| 1958 | Southwestern Athletic Conference | Billy Nicks | 10–0–1 | 5–0 |
| 1960† | Southwestern Athletic Conference | Billy Nicks | 10–1 | 6–1 |
| 1963 | Southwestern Athletic Conference | Billy Nicks | 10–1 | 7–0 |
| 1964 | Southwestern Athletic Conference | Billy Nicks | 9–0 | 7–0 |
| 2009 | Southwestern Athletic Conference | Henry Frazier III | 9–1 | 7–0 |
| 2025 | Southwestern Athletic Conference | Tremaine Jackson | 10–3 | 7–1 |

† Co-champions

=== Division championships ===
| Year | Division | Coach | Opponent | CG result |
|---|---|---|---|---|
| 2009 | SWAC West | Henry Frazier III | Alabama A&M | W 30–24 |
| 2021 | SWAC West | Eric Dooley | Jackson State | L 10–27 |
| 2023 | SWAC West | Bubba McDowell | Florida A&M | L 14–35 |
| 2025 | SWAC West | Tremaine Jackson | Jackson State | W 23-21 |
| 2026 | SWAC West | Tremaine Jackson | TBD | TBD |

== Celebration Bowl ==
Prairie View A&M will appear in their first Celebration Bowl, the de facto national championships of black college football that matches the champion of the Mid-Eastern Athletic Conference (MEAC) and the Southwestern Athletic Conference (SWAC)—the two prominent conferences of historically black colleges and universities (HBCUs) in NCAA Division I.

| Season | Date | Coach | Opponent | Result |
|---|---|---|---|---|
| 2025 | December 13 | Tremaine Jackson | South Carolina State | L 40-38 4OT |

== New stadium ==
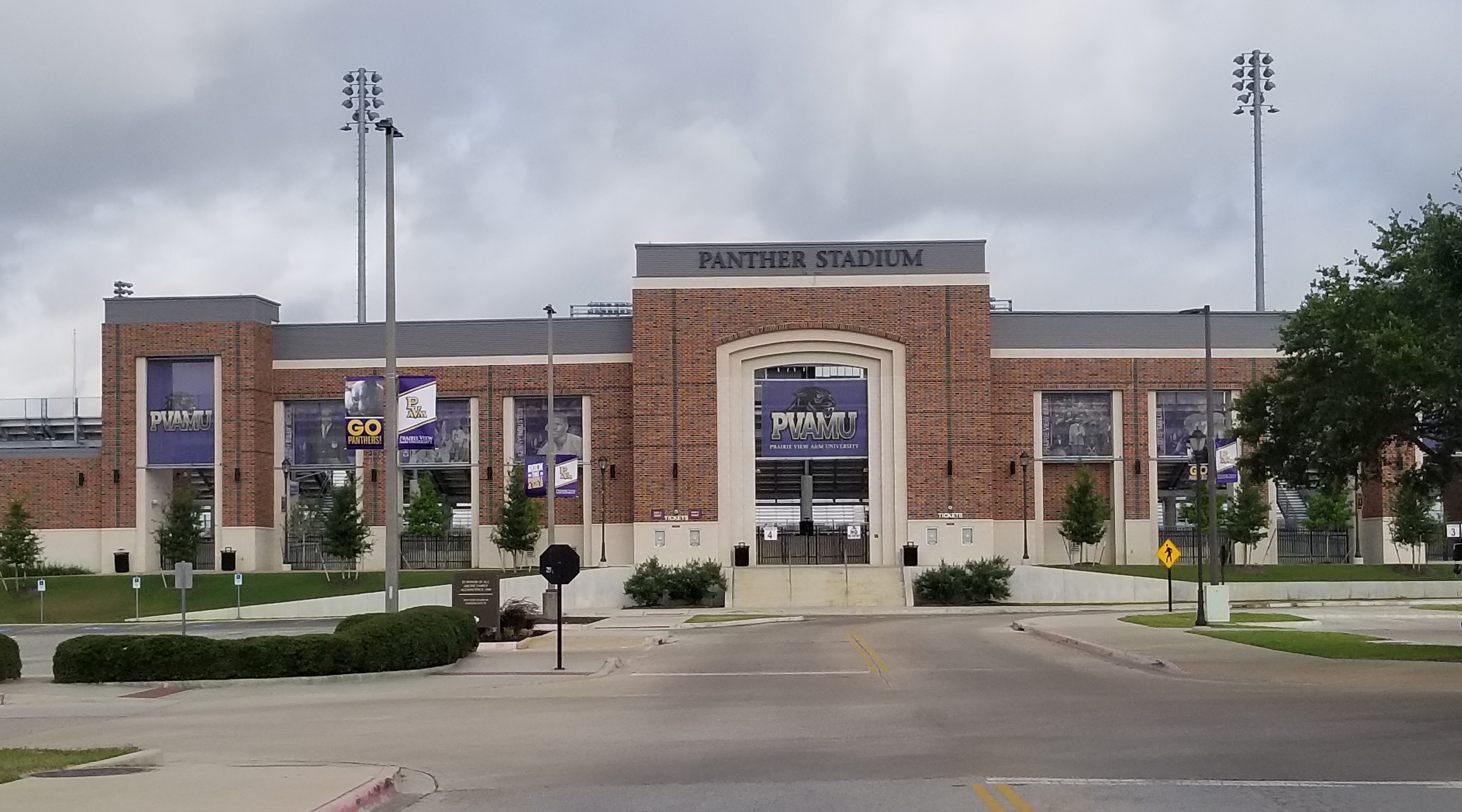
East side of Panther Stadium at Blackshear Field

In November 2014, Prairie View A&M broke ground on Panther Stadium at Blackshear Field, a $60 million football stadium and athletic field house. Completed in summer 2016, the facility is 55,000 square feet and currently holds up to 15,000 people, but is expandable to 30,000 attendees. It features 12 private suites and a press box for media operations. Prairie View A&M hosted its first game on September 4, 2016, in front of a sold-out crowd, claiming victory in the Labor Day Classic over arch-rival Texas Southern, 29 to 25. Prairie View finished its inaugural season in its new home stadium with three wins and one loss.

== Annual classics ==
- Labor Day Classic versus Texas Southern Tigers
- State Fair Classic versus Grambling State Tigers
- Prairie View Bowl

== College Football Hall of Fame members ==
- Billy Nicks (head coach; 1945–1965)

== Alumni in the NFL ==
Over 30 Prairie View alumni have played in the National Football League (NFL), with one Hall of Famer, including:

=== Pro Football Hall of Fame ===
| Induted | Name | Position | Years | Ref. |
|---|---|---|---|---|
| 1986 | Ken Houston | S | 1963–1966 | |

- Sam Adams Sr.
- Quinton Bell
- Charlie Brackins
- Rufus Granderson
- KhaDarel Hodge
- Jordan Holland
- Sam Johnson
- Jim Kearney
- Bivian Lee
- Jim Mitchell
- Quinton Spears
- Anthony Stubbs
- Otis Taylor
- Matthew Teague
- Donnie Williams
- Charles Wright

== Future non-conference opponents ==
Announced schedules as of June 30, 2026

| 2026 | 2027 | 2028 | 2029 | 2030 |
|---|---|---|---|---|
| at Tarleton State | East Texas A&M | at Arizona | Houston Christian | at Houston Christian |
| at Baylor | at Houston | UTRGV | at UTRGV | at Stephen F. Austin |
| Stephen F. Austin | Tarleton State | | | |
| at East Texas A&M | at UTRGV | | | |
