= 2009 Texas Southern Tigers football team =

American college football season

2009 Texas Southern Tigers football
- Conference: Southwestern Athletic Conference
- West Division
- Record: 6–5 (5–2 SWAC)
- Head coach: Johnnie Cole (2nd season)
- Defensive coordinator: Kevin Ramsey (1st season)
- Home stadium: Reliant Stadium; Delmar Stadium

2009 Southwestern Athletic Conference football standings
	Conf.			Overall
Team	W		L	W		L
East Division
Alabama A&M xy	4	–	3	7	–	5
Alcorn State	3	–	4	3	–	6
Jackson State	3	–	4	3	–	7
Alabama State	1	–	6	4	–	7
Mississippi Valley State	1	–	6	3	–	8
West Division
No. 15 Prairie View A&M xy$	7	–	0	9	–	1
Grambling State	5	–	2	7	–	4
Texas Southern	5	–	2	6	–	5
Southern	3	–	4	6	–	6
Arkansas–Pine Bluff	3	–	4	5	–	5
Championship: Prairie View A&M 30, Alabama A&M 24
$ – Conference champion; x – Division champion/co-champions; y – Championship game participant; Rankings from The Sports Network Poll

The 2009 Texas Southern Tigers football team represented Texas Southern University as a member of the Southwestern Athletic Conference (SWAC) during the 2009 NCAA Division I FCS football season. Led by second-year head coach Johnnie Cole, the Tigers compiled an overall record of 6–5, with a mark of 5–2 in conference play, and finished third in the West Division of the SWAC.

== Schedule ==
Date	Time	Opponent	Site	Result	Attendance	Source
September 5		Prairie View A&M	Reliant Stadium; Houston, TX (Labor Day Classic)	L 7–17		
September 12		at Louisiana–Monroe*	Malone Stadium; Monroe, LA	L 0–58	9,330	
September 19		Texas College*	Delmar Stadium; Houston, TX	W 75–6		
September 26		at No. 23 Texas State*	Bobcat Stadium; San Marcos, TX	L 18–52	12,754	
October 10		at Rutgers*	Rutgers Stadium; Piscataway, NJ	L 0–42	50,169	
October 17		at Jackson State	Mississippi Veterans Memorial Stadium; Jackson, MS	W 19–17		
October 31		Alcorn State	Delmar Stadium; Houston, TX	W 51–21		
November 7		at Mississippi Valley State	Rice–Totten Stadium; Itta Bena, MS	W 30–7		
November 12		at Grambling State	Eddie G. Robinson Memorial Stadium; Grambling, LA	L 33–49		
November 28		vs. Arkansas–Pine Bluff	Cotton Bowl; Dallas, TX	W 14–10		
December 5	1:00 p.m.	Southern	Delmar Stadium; Houston, TX	W 30–25	10,769	
*Non-conference game; Rankings from The Sports Network Poll released prior to the game; All times are in Central time
