= 2009 Prairie View A&M Panthers football team =

American college football season

2009 Prairie View A&M Panthers football

SWAC champion SWAC West Division champion

SWAC Championship Game, W 30–24 vs. Alabama A&M
- Conference: Southwestern Athletic Conference

Ranking
- Sports Network: No. 15
- FCS Coaches: No. 19
- Record: 9–1 (7–0 SWAC)
- Head coach: Henry Frazier III (6th season)
- Home stadium: Edward L. Blackshear Field

2009 Southwestern Athletic Conference football standings
	Conf.			Overall
Team	W		L	W		L
East Division
Alabama A&M xy	4	–	3	7	–	5
Alcorn State	3	–	4	3	–	6
Jackson State	3	–	4	3	–	7
Alabama State	1	–	6	4	–	7
Mississippi Valley State	1	–	6	3	–	8
West Division
No. 15 Prairie View A&M xy$	7	–	0	9	–	1
Grambling State	5	–	2	7	–	4
Texas Southern	5	–	2	6	–	5
Southern	3	–	4	6	–	6
Arkansas–Pine Bluff	3	–	4	5	–	5
Championship: Prairie View A&M 30, Alabama A&M 24
$ – Conference champion; x – Division champion/co-champions; y – Championship game participant; Rankings from The Sports Network Poll

The 2009 Prairie View A&M Panthers football team represented Prairie View A&M University as a member of the Southwestern Athletic Conference (SWAC) during the 2009 NCAA Division I FCS football season. Led by sixth-year head coach Henry Frazier III, the Panthers compiled an overall record of 9–1 and a mark of 7–0 in conference play, and won their first SWAC Championship since 1964 against Alabama A&M 30-24.

== Schedule ==
Date	Time	Opponent	Rank	Site	Result	Attendance	Source
September 5		at Texas Southern		Reliant Stadium; Houston, TX (Labor Day Classic)	W 17–7		
September 12		at New Mexico State*		Aggie Memorial Stadium; Las Cruces, NM	L 18–21	15,902	
October 3		vs. Grambling State		Cotton Bowl; Dallas, TX (rivalry)	W 35–32	9,647	
October 10		at Alabama State		Cramton Bowl; Montgomery, AL	W 24–10		
October 17		Mississippi Valley State		Edward L. Blackshear Field; Prairie View, TX	W 38–0	10,000	
October 22	6:30 p.m.	at Southern		A. W. Mumford Stadium; Baton Rouge, LA	W 16–14	6,463	
November 7		Alabama A&M	No. 22	Edward L. Blackshear Field; Prairie View, TX	W 33–27		
November 14		at Alcorn State	No. 21	Jack Spinks Stadium; Lorman, MS	W 34–14		
November 21		Arkansas–Pine Bluff	No. 20	Edward L. Blackshear Field; Prairie View, TX	W 49–17		
December 12		vs. Alabama A&M*	No. 18	Legion Field; Birmingham, AL (SWAC Championship Game)	W 30–24	20,218	
*Non-conference game; Rankings from The Sports Network Poll released prior to the game; All times are in Central time
