= 2009 Alabama A&M Bulldogs football team =

American college football season

2009 Alabama A&M Bulldogs football

SWAC East Division champion

SWAC Championship Game, L 24–31 vs. Prairie View A&M
- Conference: Southwestern Athletic Conference
- Record: 7–5 (4–3 SWAC)
- Head coach: Anthony Jones (8th season)
- Offensive coordinator: Cedric Pearl (3rd season)
- Home stadium: Louis Crews Stadium

2009 Southwestern Athletic Conference football standings
	Conf.			Overall
Team	W		L	W		L
East Division
Alabama A&M xy	4	–	3	7	–	5
Alcorn State	3	–	4	3	–	6
Jackson State	3	–	4	3	–	7
Alabama State	1	–	6	4	–	7
Mississippi Valley State	1	–	6	3	–	8
West Division
No. 15 Prairie View A&M xy$	7	–	0	9	–	1
Grambling State	5	–	2	7	–	4
Texas Southern	5	–	2	6	–	5
Southern	3	–	4	6	–	6
Arkansas–Pine Bluff	3	–	4	5	–	5
Championship: Prairie View A&M 30, Alabama A&M 24
$ – Conference champion; x – Division champion/co-champions; y – Championship game participant; Rankings from The Sports Network Poll

The 2009 Alabama A&M Bulldogs football team represented Alabama A&M University as a member of the Southwestern Athletic Conference (SWAC) during the 2009 NCAA Division I FCS football season. Led by eighth-year head coach Anthony Jones, the Bulldogs compiled an overall record of 7–5 and a mark of 4–3 in conference play, and finished first in the SWAC East Division.

== Schedule ==
Date	Opponent	Site	Result	Attendance	Source
September 5	at Tennessee State*	LP Field; Nashville, TN (John Merritt Classic)	W 24–7	23,871	
September 12	Hampton*	Louis Crews Stadium; Normal, AL	W 31–24	6,377	
September 19	No. 24 Jacksonville State*	Louis Crews Stadium; Huntsville, AL	L 13–45	2,906	
September 26	Arkansas–Pine Bluff	Louis Crews Stadium; Normal, AL	W 28–7		
October 3	vs. Tuskegee*	Lucas Oil Stadium; Indianapolis, IN (Circle City Classic)	W 35–15		
October 10	at Grambling State	Eddie G. Robinson Memorial Stadium; Grambling, LA	L 20–41		
October 17	at Alcorn State	Jack Spinks Stadium; Lorman, MS	L 16–34		
October 31	vs. Alabama State	Legion Field; Birmingham, AL (Magic City Classic)	W 21–7	55,322	
November 7	at No. 22 Prairie View A&M	Edward L. Blackshear Field; Prairie View, TX	L 27–33		
November 14	Jackson State	Louis Crews Stadium; Normal, AL	W 13–5		
November 21	Mississippi Valley State	Louis Crews Stadium; Normal, AL	W 17–12	2,776	
December 12	vs. No. 18 Prairie View A&M	Legion Field; Birmingham, AL (SWAC Championship Game)	L 24–30	20,218	
*Non-conference game; Rankings from The Sports Network Poll released prior to the game
