= 2012 Jackson State Tigers football team =

American college football season

2012 Jackson State Tigers football

SWAC East Division champion

SWAC Championship Game, L 21–24 vs. Arkansas–Pine Bluff
- Conference: Southwestern Athletic Conference
- East Division
- Record: 7–5 (7–2 SWAC)
- Head coach: Rick Comegy (7th season)
- Offensive coordinator: Derrick McCall (1st season)
- Defensive coordinator: Darrin Hayes (7th season)
- Home stadium: Mississippi Veterans Memorial Stadium

2012 Southwestern Athletic Conference football standings
	Conf.			Overall
Team	W		L	W		L
East Division
Jackson State xy	7	–	2	7	–	5
Alabama State	7	–	2	7	–	4
Alabama A&M	6	–	3	7	–	4
Mississippi Valley State	5	–	4	5	–	6
Alcorn State	4	–	5	4	–	7
West Division
Arkansas–Pine Bluff xy$	8	–	1	10	–	2
Prairie View A&M	3	–	6	3	–	8
Southern	3	–	6	4	–	7
Texas Southern *	2	–	7	2	–	9
Grambling State	0	–	9	1	–	10
Championship: Arkansas–Pine Bluff 24, Jackson State 21 ^{OT}
$ – Conference champion; x – Division champion/co-champions; y – Championship game participant; * – ineligible for postseason

The 2012 Jackson State Tigers football team represented Jackson State University in the 2012 NCAA Division I FCS football season. The Tigers were led by seventh-year head coach Rick Comegy and played their home games at Mississippi Veterans Memorial Stadium. They were a member of the East Division Southwestern Athletic Conference (SWAC). They finished with an overall record of seven wins and five losses (7–5, 7–2 SWAC) and lost to Arkansas–Pine Bluff in the SWAC Championship Game.

== Schedule ==
Date	Time	Opponent	Site	TV	Result	Attendance
September 1	7:00 pm	at Mississippi State*	Davis Wade Stadium; Starkville, MS	Fox Sports South	L 9–56	55,082
September 8	6:00 pm	vs. Tennessee State*	Liberty Bowl Memorial Stadium; Memphis, TN (Southern Heritage Classic)	Fox Sports South	L 12–38	42,257
September 15	7:30 pm	at Texas Southern	BBVA Compass Stadium; Houston, TX		W 45–35	14,623
September 22	4:00 pm	Southern	Mississippi Veterans Memorial Stadium; Jackson, MS (rivalry)		L 21–28	20,713
September 29	4:00 pm	Prairie View A&M	Mississippi Veterans Memorial Stadium; Jackson, MS	SWAC TV	W 34–13	8,566
October 6	6:00 pm	at Arkansas–Pine Bluff	Golden Lion Stadium; Pine Bluff, AR	SWAC TV	L 24–34	6,953
October 13	7:00 pm	at Alabama State	Cramton Bowl; Montgomery, AL		W 37–34	10,154
October 20	3:00 pm	Mississippi Valley State^{†}	Mississippi Veterans Memorial Stadium; Jackson, MS	SWAC TV	W 14–7 ^{2OT}	10,000
November 3	2:00 pm	at Grambling State	Eddie Robinson Stadium; Grambling, LA		W 53–17	7,000
November 10	4:00 pm	Alabama A&M	Mississippi Veterans Memorial Stadium; Jackson, MS		W 35–21	8,445
November 17	1:00 pm	at Alcorn State	Casem-Spinks Stadium; Lorman, MS (Soul Bowl)		W 37–11	38,120
December 8	12:00 pm	vs. Arkansas–Pine Bluff	Legion Field; Birmingham, AL (SWAC Championship Game)		L 21–24 ^{OT}	32,480
*Non-conference game; ^{†}Homecoming; All times are in Central time

== Media ==
Jackson State games were broadcast on 95.5 Hallelujah FM. All Jackson State games were also streamed online via Yahoo.
