= 2012 Arkansas–Pine Bluff Golden Lions football team =

American college football season

2012 Arkansas–Pine Bluff Golden Lions football

Black college football co-national champion SWAC champion SWAC West Division champion

SWAC Championship Game, W 24–21 vs. Jackson State
- Conference: Southwestern Athletic Conference
- West Division
- Record: 10–2 (8–1 SWAC)
- Head coach: Monte Coleman (5th season)
- Home stadium: Golden Lion Stadium

2012 Southwestern Athletic Conference football standings
	Conf.			Overall
Team	W		L	W		L
East Division
Jackson State xy	7	–	2	7	–	5
Alabama State	7	–	2	7	–	4
Alabama A&M	6	–	3	7	–	4
Mississippi Valley State	5	–	4	5	–	6
Alcorn State	4	–	5	4	–	7
West Division
Arkansas–Pine Bluff xy$	8	–	1	10	–	2
Prairie View A&M	3	–	6	3	–	8
Southern	3	–	6	4	–	7
Texas Southern *	2	–	7	2	–	9
Grambling State	0	–	9	1	–	10
Championship: Arkansas–Pine Bluff 24, Jackson State 21 ^{OT}
$ – Conference champion; x – Division champion/co-champions; y – Championship game participant; * – ineligible for postseason

The 2012 Arkansas–Pine Bluff Golden Lions football team represented the University of Arkansas at Pine Bluff in the 2012 NCAA Division I FCS football season. The Golden Lions were led by fifth year head coach Monte Coleman and played their home games at Golden Lion Stadium as a member of the West Division of the Southwestern Athletic Conference (SWAC). They finished with an overall record of ten wins and two losses (10–2, 8–1 SWAC) and as SWAC champions after they defeated Jackson State in the SWAC Championship Game.

== Schedule ==
Date	Time	Opponent	Site	TV	Result	Attendance
September 1	5:00 pm	vs. Langston*	War Memorial Stadium; Little Rock, AR (Delta Classic)		W 17–14	14,500
September 8	6:00 pm	Alabama A&M	Golden Lion Stadium; Pine Bluff, AR	SWAC TV	L 10–14	11,300
September 15	4:00 pm	at Alcorn State	Casem-Spinks Stadium; Lorman, MS		W 24–6	8,200
September 20	6:30 pm	at Alabama State	Cramton Bowl; Montgomery, AL	ESPNU	W 24–21	18,110
September 29	5:00 pm	at Tennessee State*	LP Field; Nashville, TN		L 13–40	31,765
October 6	6:00 pm	Jackson State	Golden Lion Stadium; Pine Bluff, AR	SWAC TV	W 34–24	6,953
October 20	6:00 pm	at Southern	Ace W. Mumford Stadium; Baton Rouge, LA		W 50–21	13,500
October 27	2:30 pm	Mississippi Valley State^{†}	Golden Lion Stadium; Pine Bluff, AR		W 10–0	14,604
November 3	2:00 pm	at Texas Southern	BBVA Compass Stadium; Houston, TX		W 49–3	2,968
November 10	2:00 pm	at Grambling State	Eddie Robinson Stadium; Grambling, LA		W 24–17	7,324
November 17	2:30 pm	Prairie View A&M	Golden Lion Stadium; Pine Bluff, AR		W 42–41	3,088
December 8	12:00 pm	vs. Jackson State	Legion Field; Birmingham, AL (SWAC Championship Game)		W 24–21 ^{OT}	32,480
*Non-conference game; ^{†}Homecoming; All times are in Central time

== Media ==
Golden Lions football games were an exclusive presentation of KUAP 89.7 FM. They broadcast every game in the 2012 season.
