= 2014 Arkansas–Pine Bluff Golden Lions football team =

American college football season

2014 Arkansas–Pine Bluff Golden Lions football
- Conference: Southwestern Athletic Conference
- West Division
- Record: 4–7 (3–6 SWAC)
- Head coach: Monte Coleman (7th season)
- Offensive coordinator: Anthony Jones (1st season)
- Defensive coordinator: Monte Coleman (9th season)
- Home stadium: Golden Lion Stadium

2014 Southwestern Athletic Conference football standings
	Conf.			Overall
Team	W		L	W		L
East Division
Alcorn State x$	7	–	2	10	–	3
Alabama State *	5	–	4	7	–	5
Jackson State	3	–	6	5	–	7
Alabama A&M	3	–	6	4	–	8
Mississippi Valley State *	1	–	8	2	–	9
West Division
Southern xy	8	–	1	9	–	4
Grambling State	7	–	2	7	–	5
Prairie View A&M *	5	–	4	5	–	5
Texas Southern	3	–	6	5	–	6
Arkansas–Pine Bluff *	3	–	6	4	–	7
Championship: Alcorn State 38, Southern 24
$ – Conference champion; x – Division champion/co-champions; y – Championship game participant; * – ineligible for postseason due to APR violations

The 2014 Arkansas–Pine Bluff Golden Lions football team represented the University of Arkansas at Pine Bluff in the 2014 NCAA Division I FCS football season. The Golden Lions were led by seventh-year head coach Monte Coleman and played their home games at Golden Lion Stadium as a member of the West Division of the Southwestern Athletic Conference (SWAC). They finished the season 4–7, 3–6 in SWAC play to finish in a tie for fourth place in the West Division.

== Schedule ==
Date	Time	Opponent	Site	TV	Result	Attendance
August 30	6:00 pm	at Texas State*	Bobcat Stadium; San Marcos, TX	ESPN3	L 0–65	17,813
September 6	6:00 pm	Concordia (AL)*	Golden Lion Stadium; Pine Bluff, AR		W 31–0	4,017
September 18	6:30 pm	at Alabama State	The New ASU Stadium; Montgomery, AL	ESPNU	L 7–42	7,902
September 27	6:00 pm	Jackson State	Golden Lion Stadium; Pine Bluff, AR		L 30–33 ^{OT}	8,344
October 4	5:30 pm	at Southern	Ace W. Mumford Stadium; Baton Rouge, LA		L 36–51	23,091
October 18	2:00 pm	at Grambling State	Eddie Robinson Stadium; Grambling, LA		L 39–63	10,000
October 25	2:00 pm	at Texas Southern	BBVA Compass Stadium; Houston, TX		W 38–37	8,210
November 1	2:30 pm	Mississippi Valley State	Golden Lion Stadium; Pine Bluff, AR		W 24–14	2,349
November 8	2:30 pm	Prairie View A&M^{†}	Golden Lion Stadium; Pine Bluff, AR		L 23–51	12,337
November 15	4:00 pm	at Alcorn State	Casem-Spinks Stadium; Lorman, MS		L 6–56	5,775
November 22	2:30 pm	Alabama A&M	Golden Lion Stadium; Pine Bluff, AR		W 20–19	2,989
*Non-conference game; ^{†}Homecoming; All times are in Central time
