= 2014 Jackson State Tigers football team =

American college football season

2014 Jackson State Tigers football
- Conference: Southwestern Athletic Conference
- East Division
- Record: 5–7 (3–6 SWAC)
- Head coach: Harold Jackson (1st season)
- Offensive coordinator: Timmy Chang (1st season)
- Offensive scheme: Run and shoot
- Defensive coordinator: Derrick Burroughs (1st season)
- Base defense: 4–3
- Home stadium: Mississippi Veterans Memorial Stadium

2014 Southwestern Athletic Conference football standings
	Conf.			Overall
Team	W		L	W		L
East Division
Alcorn State x$	7	–	2	10	–	3
Alabama State *	5	–	4	7	–	5
Jackson State	3	–	6	5	–	7
Alabama A&M	3	–	6	4	–	8
Mississippi Valley State *	1	–	8	2	–	9
West Division
Southern xy	8	–	1	9	–	4
Grambling State	7	–	2	7	–	5
Prairie View A&M *	5	–	4	5	–	5
Texas Southern	3	–	6	5	–	6
Arkansas–Pine Bluff *	3	–	6	4	–	7
Championship: Alcorn State 38, Southern 24
$ – Conference champion; x – Division champion/co-champions; y – Championship game participant; * – ineligible for postseason due to APR violations

The 2014 Jackson State Tigers football team represented Jackson State University in the 2014 NCAA Division I FCS football season. The Tigers were led by first-year head coach Harold Jackson and played their home games at Mississippi Veterans Memorial Stadium. They were a member of the East Division of the Southwestern Athletic Conference. They finished the season 5–7, 3–6 in SWAC play to finish in a tie for third place in the East Division.

== Schedule ==
Date	Time	Opponent	Site	Result	Attendance
August 30	6:00 pm	Florida A&M*	Mississippi Veterans Memorial Stadium; Jackson, MS	W 22–17	5,193
September 6	6:00 pm	Virginia–Lynchburg*	Mississippi Veterans Memorial Stadium; Jackson, MS	W 59–0	8,101
September 13	6:00 pm	vs. Tennessee State*	Liberty Bowl Memorial Stadium; Memphis, TN (Southern Heritage Classic)	L 7–35	46,914
September 20	6:00 pm	Grambling State	Mississippi Veterans Memorial Stadium; Jackson, MS	L 35–40	18,522
September 27	6:00 pm	at Arkansas–Pine Bluff	Golden Lion Stadium; Pine Bluff, AR	W 33–30 ^{OT}	8,344
October 4	6:00 pm	Prairie View A&M	Mississippi Veterans Memorial Stadium; Jackson, MS	L 30–48	7,881
October 11	2:00 pm	Mississippi Valley State^{†}	Mississippi Veterans Memorial Stadium; Jackson, MS	L 23–27	21,078
October 25	6:00 pm	Southern	Mississippi Veterans Memorial Stadium; Jackson, MS (rivalry)	L 28–42	29,521
November 1	6:00 pm	Alabama A&M	Mississippi Veterans Memorial Stadium; Jackson, MS	L 14–25	4,327
November 8	1:00 pm	at Alabama State	New ASU Stadium; Montgomery, AL	L 10–26	17,560
November 15	6:00 pm	at Texas Southern	BBVA Compass Stadium; Houston, TX	W 15–10	2,824
November 22	2:00 pm	at Alcorn State	Casem-Spinks Stadium; Lorman, MS (Soul Bowl)	W 34–31	27,533
*Non-conference game; ^{†}Homecoming; All times are in Central time
