= 2012 Alcorn State Braves football team =

American college football season

2012 Alcorn State Braves football
- Conference: Southwestern Athletic Conference
- East Division
- Record: 4–7 (4–5 SWAC)
- Head coach: Jay Hopson (1st season)
- Offensive coordinator: Willie Simmons (1st season)
- Defensive coordinator: Tony Pecoraro (1st season)
- Home stadium: Casem-Spinks Stadium

2012 Southwestern Athletic Conference football standings
	Conf.			Overall
Team	W		L	W		L
East Division
Jackson State xy	7	–	2	7	–	5
Alabama State	7	–	2	7	–	4
Alabama A&M	6	–	3	7	–	4
Mississippi Valley State	5	–	4	5	–	6
Alcorn State	4	–	5	4	–	7
West Division
Arkansas–Pine Bluff xy$	8	–	1	10	–	2
Prairie View A&M	3	–	6	3	–	8
Southern	3	–	6	4	–	7
Texas Southern *	2	–	7	2	–	9
Grambling State	0	–	9	1	–	10
Championship: Arkansas–Pine Bluff 24, Jackson State 21 ^{OT}
$ – Conference champion; x – Division champion/co-champions; y – Championship game participant; * – ineligible for postseason

The 2012 Alcorn State Braves football team represented Alcorn State University in the 2012 NCAA Division I FCS football season. The Braves were led by first-year head coach Jay Hopson, and played their home games at Casem-Spinks Stadium. Hopson is the first non-black head coach to coach at a historically black university in either the MEAC or SWAC. They were a member of the East Division of the Southwestern Athletic Conference (SWAC) and finished the season with an overall record of four wins and seven losses (4–7, 4–5 SWAC).

== Media ==
All Braves games were broadcast live on WPRL 91.7 FM.

== Schedule ==
Date	Time	Opponent	Site	TV	Result	Attendance
September 1	6:00 pm	vs. Grambling State	Independence Stadium; Shreveport, LA (Port City Classic)	SWAC TV	W 22–21	N/A
September 8	7:00 pm	at No. 5 James Madison*	Bridgeforth Stadium; Harrisonburg, VA		L 3–42	20,239
September 15	4:00 pm	Arkansas–Pine Bluff	Casem-Spinks Stadium; Lorman, MS		L 6–24	8,200
September 22	6:00 pm	at Arkansas State*	Liberty Bank Stadium; Jonesboro, AR	ESPN3	L 0–56	21,559
September 29	2:00 pm	Alabama State	Casem-Spinks Stadium; Lorman, MS		L 14–54	946
October 6	4:00 pm	Southern	Casem-Spinks Stadium; Lorman, MS	ESPN3; ESPNU Tape Delay at 9:30 PM	W 20–17	15,000
October 13	1:00 pm	at Alabama A&M	Louis Crews Stadium; Huntsville, AL		W 21–20	16,781
October 20	1:00 pm	at Prairie View A&M	Edward L. Blackshear Field; Prairie View, TX	CSN Houston	L 37–52	12,000
November 3	1:00 pm	at Mississippi Valley State	Rice–Totten Field; Itta Bena, MS		L 9–33	6,708
November 10	2:00 pm	Texas Southern	Casem-Spinks Stadium; Lorman, MS		W 34–24	4,309
November 17	1:00 pm	Jackson State	Casem-Spinks Stadium; Lorman, MS (Capital City Classic)		L 11–37	30,000
*Non-conference game; Rankings from The Sports Network FCS Poll released prior to game Poll released prior to the game; All times are in Central time
