= 2012 Alabama A&M Bulldogs football team =

American college football season

2012 Alabama A&M Bulldogs football
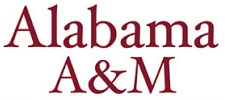
- Conference: Southwestern Athletic Conference
- East Division
- Record: 7–4 (6–3 SWAC)
- Head coach: Anthony Jones (11th season)
- Offensive coordinator: Cedric Pearl (6th season)
- Defensive coordinator: Brawnski Towns (34th season)
- Home stadium: Louis Crews Stadium

2012 Southwestern Athletic Conference football standings
	Conf.			Overall
Team	W		L	W		L
East Division
Jackson State xy	7	–	2	7	–	5
Alabama State	7	–	2	7	–	4
Alabama A&M	6	–	3	7	–	4
Mississippi Valley State	5	–	4	5	–	6
Alcorn State	4	–	5	4	–	7
West Division
Arkansas–Pine Bluff xy$	8	–	1	10	–	2
Prairie View A&M	3	–	6	3	–	8
Southern	3	–	6	4	–	7
Texas Southern *	2	–	7	2	–	9
Grambling State	0	–	9	1	–	10
Championship: Arkansas–Pine Bluff 24, Jackson State 21 ^{OT}
$ – Conference champion; x – Division champion/co-champions; y – Championship game participant; * – ineligible for postseason

The 2012 Alabama A&M Bulldogs football team represented Alabama Agricultural and Mechanical University (Alabama A&M) in the 2012 NCAA Division I FCS football season. The Bulldogs were led by 11th-year head coach Anthony Jones and played their home games at Louis Crews Stadium. They were a member of the East Division of the Southwestern Athletic Conference and finished the season with an overall record of seven wins and four losses (7–4, 6–3 SWAC).

== Schedule ==
Date	Time	Opponent	Site	TV	Result	Attendance
September 1	6:00 pm	vs. Tuskegee*	Legion Field; Birmingham, AL		W 7–6	21,400
September 8	6:00 pm	at Arkansas–Pine Bluff	Golden Lion Stadium; Pine Bluff, AR	SWAC TV	W 14–10	11,300
September 16	6:00 pm	Prairie View A&M	Louis Crews Stadium; Huntsville, AL (Louis Crews Classic)		W 42–30	5,325
September 22	11:00 am	at Texas Southern	BBVA Compass Stadium; Houston, TX	SWAC TV	W 42–13	4,484
September 29	6:00 pm	Grambling State	Louis Crews Stadium; Huntsville, AL	ESPNU	W 38–17	6,823
October 6	1:00 pm	at Mississippi Valley State	Rice–Totten Field; Itta Bena, MS		W 35–0	4,296
October 13	1:00 pm	Alcorn State^{†}	Louis Crews Stadium; Huntsville, AL		L 20–21	16,781
October 27	2:30 pm	vs. Alabama State	Legion Field; Birmingham, AL (75th Magic City Classic)	ESPNU	L 13–31	58,201
November 3	1:00 pm	Southern	Louis Crews Stadium; Huntsville, AL	SWAC TV	W 24–23 ^{OT}	10,208
November 10	2:00 pm	at Jackson State	Mississippi Veterans Memorial Stadium; Jackson, MS		L 21–35	8,445
November 17	1:30 pm	at Auburn*	Jordan–Hare Stadium; Auburn, AL	PPV	L 7–51	74,832
*Non-conference game; ^{†}Homecoming; All times are in Central time
