= 2012 Alabama State Hornets football team =

American college football season

2012 Alabama State Hornets football
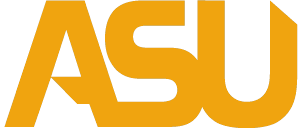
- Conference: Southwestern Athletic Conference
- East Division
- Record: 7–4 (7–2 SWAC)
- Head coach: Reggie Barlow (6th season)
- Offensive coordinator: Fred Kaiss (2nd season)
- Defensive coordinator: Cedric Thornton (3rd season)
- Home stadium: Cramton Bowl; Hornet Stadium

2012 Southwestern Athletic Conference football standings
	Conf.			Overall
Team	W		L	W		L
East Division
Jackson State xy	7	–	2	7	–	5
Alabama State	7	–	2	7	–	4
Alabama A&M	6	–	3	7	–	4
Mississippi Valley State	5	–	4	5	–	6
Alcorn State	4	–	5	4	–	7
West Division
Arkansas–Pine Bluff xy$	8	–	1	10	–	2
Prairie View A&M	3	–	6	3	–	8
Southern	3	–	6	4	–	7
Texas Southern *	2	–	7	2	–	9
Grambling State	0	–	9	1	–	10
Championship: Arkansas–Pine Bluff 24, Jackson State 21 ^{OT}
$ – Conference champion; x – Division champion/co-champions; y – Championship game participant; * – ineligible for postseason

The 2012 Alabama State Hornets football team represented Alabama State University as a member of the East Division of the Southwestern Athletic Conference (SWAC) during 2012 NCAA Division I FCS football season. Led by sixth-year head coach Reggie Barlow, the Hornets compiled an overall record of 7–4 with a mark of 7–2 in conference play. Alabama State played home games in Montgomery, Alabama, at the Cramton Bowl until Thanksgiving Day, when they moved into the newly-built Hornet Stadium.

== Schedule ==
Date	Time	Opponent	Site	TV	Result	Attendance
September 2	11:00 am	vs. Bethune–Cookman*	Florida Citrus Bowl; Orlando, FL (MEAC/SWAC Challenge)	ESPN	L 28–38	17,410
September 8	1:00 pm	Mississippi Valley State	Cramton Bowl; Montgomery, AL		W 29–7	11,804
September 15	4:00 pm	at Grambling State	Eddie Robinson Stadium; Grambling, LA	SWAC TV	W 19–18	8,062
September 20	6:30 pm	Arkansas–Pine Bluff	Cramton Bowl; Montgomery, AL	ESPNU	L 21–24	18,110
September 29	2:00 pm	at Alcorn State	Casem-Spinks Stadium; Lorman, MS		W 54–14	946
October 6	1:00 pm	Texas Southern	Cramton Bowl; Montgomery, AL		W 45–0	3,356
October 13	1:00 pm	Jackson State	Cramton Bowl; Montgomery, AL		L 34–37	10,154
October 27	2:30 pm	vs. Alabama A&M	Legion Field; Birmingham, AL (Magic City Classic)	ESPNU	W 31–13	58,201
November 3	1:00 pm	at Prairie View A&M	Edward L. Blackshear Field; Prairie View, TX		W 35–21	2,348
November 10	6:00 pm	at Southern	Ace W. Mumford Stadium; Baton Rouge, LA		W 31–30	14,220
November 22	3:00 pm	Tuskegee*^{†}	Hornet Stadium; Montgomery, AL (Turkey Day Classic)	ESPNU	L 25–27	27,500
*Non-conference game; ^{†}Homecoming; All times are in Central time

== Media ==
All Hornets football games were broadcast live on WVAS 90.7 FM and were streamed on the team's website at bamastatesports.com.
