= 2014 Alabama A&M Bulldogs football team =

American college football season

2014 Alabama A&M Bulldogs football
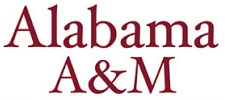
- Conference: Southwestern Athletic Conference
- East Division
- Record: 4–8 (3–6 SWAC)
- Head coach: James Spady (1st season)
- Offensive coordinator: Phil Dorn (1st season)
- Defensive coordinator: Reggie Johnson (1st season)
- Home stadium: Louis Crews Stadium

2014 Southwestern Athletic Conference football standings
	Conf.			Overall
Team	W		L	W		L
East Division
Alcorn State x$	7	–	2	10	–	3
Alabama State *	5	–	4	7	–	5
Jackson State	3	–	6	5	–	7
Alabama A&M	3	–	6	4	–	8
Mississippi Valley State *	1	–	8	2	–	9
West Division
Southern xy	8	–	1	9	–	4
Grambling State	7	–	2	7	–	5
Prairie View A&M *	5	–	4	5	–	5
Texas Southern	3	–	6	5	–	6
Arkansas–Pine Bluff *	3	–	6	4	–	7
Championship: Alcorn State 38, Southern 24
$ – Conference champion; x – Division champion/co-champions; y – Championship game participant; * – ineligible for postseason due to APR violations

The 2014 Alabama A&M Bulldogs football team represented Alabama Agricultural and Mechanical University (Alabama A&M) in the 2014 NCAA Division I FCS football season. The Bulldogs were led by first-year head coach James Spady and played their home games at Louis Crews Stadium. They were a member of the East Division of the Southwestern Athletic Conference. They finished the season 4–8, 3–6 in SWAC play to finish in a tie for third place in the East Division.

== Schedule ==
Date	Time	Opponent	Site	TV	Result	Attendance
August 31	10:45 a.m.	vs. North Carolina A&T*	Bright House Networks Stadium; Orlando, FL (MEAC/SWAC Challenge)	ESPN	L 13–47	8,210
September 6	1:00 p.m.	Tuskegee*	Louis Crews Stadium; Huntsville, AL		W 30–17	5,378
September 13	3:30 p.m.	at UAB*	Legion Field; Birmingham, AL	ASN	L 14–41	29,604
September 20	7:00 p.m.	at Texas Southern	BBVA Compass Stadium; Houston, TX		L 23–45	2,146
September 27	4:00 p.m.	at Mississippi Valley State	Rice–Totten Field; Itta Bena, MS		W 42–20	3,287
October 4	2:00 p.m.	Grambling State^{†}	Louis Crews Stadium; Huntsville, AL (Lewis Crews Classic)		L 28–38	21,254
October 11	1:00 p.m.	Southern	Louis Crews Stadium; Huntsville, AL		L 34–35	5,336
October 25	2:30 p.m.	vs. Alabama State	Legion Field; Birmingham, AL (Magic City Classic)		W 37–36	67,710
November 1	6:00 p.m.	at Jackson State	Mississippi Veterans Memorial Stadium; Jackson, MS		W 25–14	4,327
November 8	1:00 p.m.	Alcorn State	Louis Crews Stadium; Huntsville, AL		L 14–41	4,050
November 15	1:00 p.m.	Prairie View A&M	Louis Crews Stadium; Huntsville, AL		L 35–38	3,300
November 22	2:30 p.m.	at Arkansas–Pine Bluff	Golden Lion Stadium; Pine Bluff, AR		L 19–20	2,989
*Non-conference game; ^{†}Homecoming; All times are in Central time
