= 2014 Texas Southern Tigers football team =

American college football season

2014 Texas Southern Tigers football
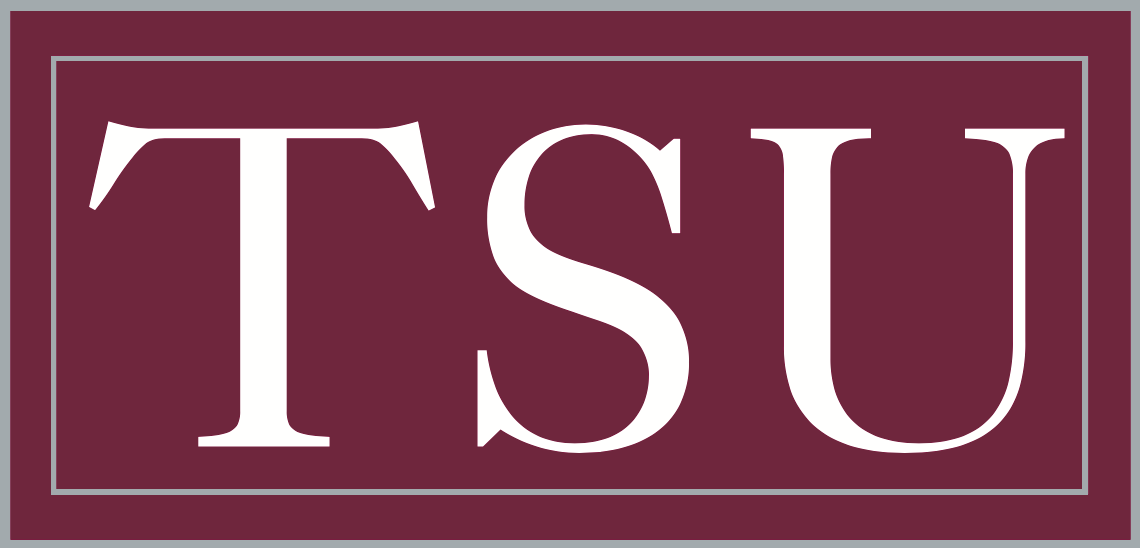
- Conference: Southwestern Athletic Conference
- West Division
- Record: 5–6 (3–6 SWAC)
- Head coach: Darrell Asberry (3rd season)
- Offensive coordinator: Darrell Asberry (3rd season)
- Defensive coordinator: Michael Vite (2nd season)
- Home stadium: BBVA Compass Stadium

2014 Southwestern Athletic Conference football standings
	Conf.			Overall
Team	W		L	W		L
East Division
Alcorn State x$	7	–	2	10	–	3
Alabama State *	5	–	4	7	–	5
Jackson State	3	–	6	5	–	7
Alabama A&M	3	–	6	4	–	8
Mississippi Valley State *	1	–	8	2	–	9
West Division
Southern xy	8	–	1	9	–	4
Grambling State	7	–	2	7	–	5
Prairie View A&M *	5	–	4	5	–	5
Texas Southern	3	–	6	5	–	6
Arkansas–Pine Bluff *	3	–	6	4	–	7
Championship: Alcorn State 38, Southern 24
$ – Conference champion; x – Division champion/co-champions; y – Championship game participant; * – ineligible for postseason due to APR violations

The 2014 Texas Southern Tigers football team represented Texas Southern University a member of the West Division of the Southwestern Athletic Conference (SWAC) during the 2014 NCAA Division I FCS football season. Led by third-year head coach Darrell Asberry, the Tigers compiled an overall record of 5–6 with a mark of 3–6 in conference play, tying for fourth place in the SWAC's West Division. Texas Southern played home games at BBVA Compass Stadium in Houston.

== Schedule ==
Date	Time	Opponent	Site	TV	Result	Attendance
August 31	4:00 pm	vs. Prairie View A&M	NRG Stadium; Houston, TX (Labor Day Classic)		W 37–35	19,189
September 4	7:30 pm	Texas College*	BBVA Compass Stadium; Houston, TX	YouTube	W 52–14	2,135
September 13	5:00 pm	vs. Central State (OH)*	Thomas Robinson Stadium; Nassau, BAH (Bahamas HBCU Classic)	HBCUX Network	W 30–16	7,802
September 20	7:00 pm	Alabama A&M	BBVA Compass Stadium; Houston, TX	YouTube	W 45–23	2,146
September 27	5:00 pm	at Alabama State	The New ASU Stadium; Montgomery, AL		L 3–38	8,014
October 4	7:00 pm	Mississippi Valley State	BBVA Compass Stadium; Houston, TX	YouTube	W 20–16	1,564
October 18	2:00 pm	at Alcorn State	Casem-Spinks Stadium; Lorman, MS		L 25–40	15,513
October 25	2:00 pm	Arkansas–Pine Bluff^{†}	BBVA Compass Stadium; Houston, TX	YouTube	L 37–38	8,210
November 1	2:00 pm	Grambling State	BBVA Compass Stadium; Houston, TX	YouTube	L 7–35	9,027
November 8	1:00 pm	at Southern	Ace W. Mumford Stadium; Baton Rouge, LA		L 20–30	14,649
November 15	2:00 pm	Jackson State	BBVA Compass Stadium; Houston, TX	YouTube	L 10–15	2,824
*Non-conference game; ^{†}Homecoming; All times are in Central time
