= 2014 Southern Jaguars football team =

American college football season

2014 Southern Jaguars football
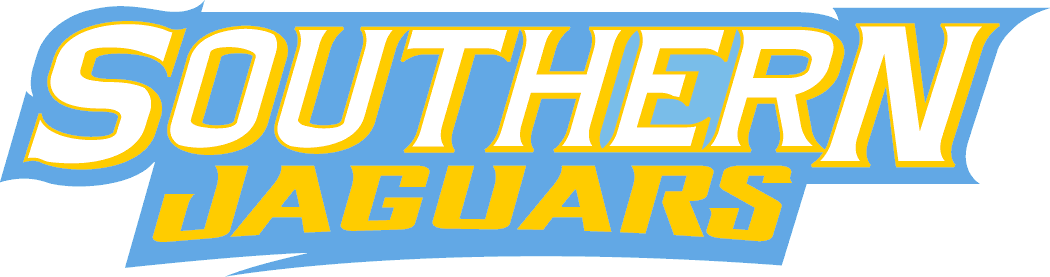

SWAC West Division champion

SWAC Championship Game, L 24–38 vs. Alcorn State
- Conference: Southwestern Athletic Conference
- West Division
- Record: 9–4 (8–1 SWAC)
- Head coach: Dawson Odums (2nd season)
- Co-offensive coordinators: Chennis Berry (2nd season); Chad Germany (3rd season)
- Defensive coordinator: Clayton Boosier (1st season)
- Home stadium: Ace W. Mumford Stadium

2014 Southwestern Athletic Conference football standings
	Conf.			Overall
Team	W		L	W		L
East Division
Alcorn State x$	7	–	2	10	–	3
Alabama State *	5	–	4	7	–	5
Jackson State	3	–	6	5	–	7
Alabama A&M	3	–	6	4	–	8
Mississippi Valley State *	1	–	8	2	–	9
West Division
Southern xy	8	–	1	9	–	4
Grambling State	7	–	2	7	–	5
Prairie View A&M *	5	–	4	5	–	5
Texas Southern	3	–	6	5	–	6
Arkansas–Pine Bluff *	3	–	6	4	–	7
Championship: Alcorn State 38, Southern 24
$ – Conference champion; x – Division champion/co-champions; y – Championship game participant; * – ineligible for postseason due to APR violations

The 2014 Southern Jaguars football team represented Southern University in the 2014 NCAA Division I FCS football season. The Jaguars were led by second-year head coach Dawson Odums. The Jaguars played their home games at Ace W. Mumford Stadium and were a member of the West Division of the Southwestern Athletic Conference (SWAC). They finished the season 9–4, 8–1 in SWAC play to win the West Division title. As West Division champions, they played East Division champions Alcorn State in the SWAC Championship Game where they lost 24–38.

== Schedule ==
Date	Time	Opponent	Site	TV	Result	Attendance
August 30	6:00 pm	at Louisiana–Lafayette*	Cajun Field; Lafayette, LA	ESPN3	L 6–45	36,170
September 6	6:00 pm	Central Methodist*	Ace W. Mumford Stadium; Baton Rouge, LA		W 56–14	13,320
September 13	6:00 pm	Northwestern State*	Ace W. Mumford Stadium; Baton Rouge, LA	CST	L 27–51	15,011
September 20	6:00 pm	at Prairie View A&M	Edward L. Blackshear Field; Prairie View, TX		W 34–24	4,762
September 27	5:00 pm	at Alcorn State	Casem-Spinks Stadium; Lorman, MS	ESPN3	L 16–56	18,759
October 4	5:30 pm	Arkansas–Pine Bluff^{†}	Ace W. Mumford Stadium; Baton Rouge, LA	CST	W 51–26	23,091
October 11	1:00 pm	at Alabama A&M	Louis Crews Stadium; Huntsville, AL		W 35–34	5,336
October 25	6:00 pm	at Jackson State	Mississippi Veterans Memorial Stadium; Jackson, MS (rivalry)	CST	W 42–28	29,521
November 1	6:00 pm	Alabama State	Ace W. Mumford Stadium; Baton Rouge, LA		W 28–21	15,400
November 8	6:00 pm	Texas Southern	Ace W. Mumford Stadium; Baton Rouge, LA		W 30–20	14,649
November 15	6:00 pm	Mississippi Valley State	Ace W. Mumford Stadium; Baton Rouge, LA	CST	W 44–13	11,022
November 29	1:30 pm	vs. Grambling State	Mercedes-Benz Superdome; New Orleans, LA (Bayou Classic)	NBC	W 52–45	57,852
December 6	3:00 pm	vs. Alcorn State	NRG Stadium; Houston, TX (SWAC Championship Game)	ESPNU	L 24–38	38,969
*Non-conference game; ^{†}Homecoming; All times are in Central time
