= 2014 Alcorn State Braves football team =

American college football season

2014 Alcorn State Braves football

Black college football national champion SWAC champion SWAC East Division champion

SWAC Championship Game, W 38–24 vs. Southern
- Conference: Southwestern Athletic Conference
- East Division
- Record: 10–3 (7–2 SWAC)
- Head coach: Jay Hopson (3rd season)
- Offensive coordinator: Willie Simmons (3rd season)
- Defensive coordinator: Tony Pecoraro (3rd season)
- Home stadium: Casem-Spinks Stadium

2014 Southwestern Athletic Conference football standings
	Conf.			Overall
Team	W		L	W		L
East Division
Alcorn State x$	7	–	2	10	–	3
Alabama State *	5	–	4	7	–	5
Jackson State	3	–	6	5	–	7
Alabama A&M	3	–	6	4	–	8
Mississippi Valley State *	1	–	8	2	–	9
West Division
Southern xy	8	–	1	9	–	4
Grambling State	7	–	2	7	–	5
Prairie View A&M *	5	–	4	5	–	5
Texas Southern	3	–	6	5	–	6
Arkansas–Pine Bluff *	3	–	6	4	–	7
Championship: Alcorn State 38, Southern 24
$ – Conference champion; x – Division champion/co-champions; y – Championship game participant; * – ineligible for postseason due to APR violations

The 2014 Alcorn State Braves football team represented Alcorn State University in the 2014 NCAA Division I FCS football season. The Braves were led by third year head coach Jay Hopson and played their home games at Casem-Spinks Stadium. They were a member of the East Division of the Southwestern Athletic Conference (SWAC) and finished with a record of 10–3 and as SWAC champions after they defeated Southern in the SWAC Championship Game.

After the season, Alcorn State was named the 2014 black college football national champions The 2014 Braves were the final black national champions named by poll, with the first annual Celebration Bowl becoming the de facto national championship game for black college football the following season.

== Schedule ==
Date	Time	Opponent	Site	TV	Result	Attendance
August 30	4:00 pm	Virginia–Lynchburg*	Casem-Spinks Stadium; Lorman, MS		W 55–7	5,497
September 6	6:00 pm	at Southern Miss*	M. M. Roberts Stadium; Hattiesburg, MS		L 20–26	26,448
September 13	4:00 pm	Louisiana College*	Casem-Spinks Stadium; Lorman, MS		W 52–10	6,999
September 20	4:00 pm	at Mississippi Valley State	Rice–Totten Field; Itta Bena, MS		W 52–9	8,673
September 27	5:00 pm	Southern	Casem-Spinks Stadium; Lorman, MS	ESPN3	W 56–16	18,759
October 2	6:30 pm	Alabama State	Casem-Spinks Stadium; Lorman, MS	ESPNU	W 33–7	5,797
October 11	2:00 pm	at Grambling State	Eddie Robinson Stadium; Grambling, LA		L 21–28	12,073
October 18	2:00 pm	Texas Southern^{†}	Casem-Spinks Stadium; Lorman, MS		W 40–25	15,513
October 25	1:00 pm	at Prairie View A&M	Edward L. Blackshear Field; Prairie View, TX		W 77–48	3,116
November 8	1:00 pm	at Alabama A&M	Louis Crews Stadium; Huntsville, AL		W 41–14	4,050
November 15	4:00 pm	Arkansas–Pine Bluff	Casem-Spinks Stadium; Lorman, MS		W 56–6	5,775
November 22	2:00 pm	Jackson State	Casem-Spinks Stadium; Lorman, MS		L 31–34	27,533
December 6	3:00 pm	vs. Southern	NRG Stadium; Houston, TX (SWAC Championship Game)	ESPNU	W 38–24	38,969
*Non-conference game; ^{†}Homecoming; All times are in Central time
