= 2014 Mississippi Valley State Delta Devils football team =

American college football season

2014 Mississippi Valley State Delta Devils football
- Conference: Southwestern Athletic Conference
- East Division
- Record: 2–9 (1–8 SWAC)
- Head coach: Rick Comegy (1st season)
- Offensive coordinator: Shawn Gregory (1st season)
- Defensive coordinator: Darrin Hayes (1st season)
- Home stadium: Rice–Totten Stadium

2014 Southwestern Athletic Conference football standings
	Conf.			Overall
Team	W		L	W		L
East Division
Alcorn State x$	7	–	2	10	–	3
Alabama State *	5	–	4	7	–	5
Jackson State	3	–	6	5	–	7
Alabama A&M	3	–	6	4	–	8
Mississippi Valley State *	1	–	8	2	–	9
West Division
Southern xy	8	–	1	9	–	4
Grambling State	7	–	2	7	–	5
Prairie View A&M *	5	–	4	5	–	5
Texas Southern	3	–	6	5	–	6
Arkansas–Pine Bluff *	3	–	6	4	–	7
Championship: Alcorn State 38, Southern 24
$ – Conference champion; x – Division champion/co-champions; y – Championship game participant; * – ineligible for postseason due to APR violations

The 2014 Mississippi Valley State Delta Devils football team represented Mississippi Valley State University as a member of the East Division of the Southwestern Athletic Conference (SWAC) during the 2014 NCAA Division I FCS football season. Led by first-year head coach Rick Comegy, the Delta Devils compiled an overall record of 2–9 and a mark of 1–8 in conference play, placing last out of five teams in the SWAC's East Division. Mississippi Valley State played home games at Rice–Totten Stadium in Itta Bena, Mississippi.

== Schedule ==
Date	Time	Opponent	Site	Result	Attendance
August 30	4:00 pm	University of Faith*	Rice–Totten Stadium; Itta Bena, MS	W 32–7	1,928
September 6	6:30 pm	at Illinois State*	Hancock Stadium; Normal, IL	L 0–62	10,243
September 13	5:00 pm	at Alabama State	New ASU Stadium; Montgomery, AL	L 22–47	13,865
September 20	4:00 pm	Alcorn State	Rice–Totten Stadium; Itta Bena, MS	L 9–52	8,673
September 27	4:00 pm	Alabama A&M	Rice–Totten Stadium; Itta Bena, MS	L 20–42	3,287
October 4	7:00 pm	at Texas Southern	BBVA Compass Stadium; Houston, TX	L 16–20	1,564
October 11	2:00 pm	at Jackson State	Mississippi Veterans Memorial Stadium; Jackson, MS	W 27–23	21,078
October 18	2:00 pm	Prairie View A&M^{†}	Rice–Totten Stadium; Itta Bena, MS	L 19–52	7,829
November 1	2:00 pm	at Arkansas–Pine Bluff	Golden Lion Stadium; Pine Bluff, AR	L 14–24	2,349
November 6	6:30 pm	Grambling State	Rice–Totten Stadium; Itta Bena, MS	L 23–38	2,024
November 15	1:00 pm	at Southern	A. W. Mumford Stadium; Baton Rouge, LA	L 13–44	11,022
*Non-conference game; ^{†}Homecoming; All times are in Central time
