= 2012 Southern Jaguars football team =

American college football season

2012 Southern Jaguars football
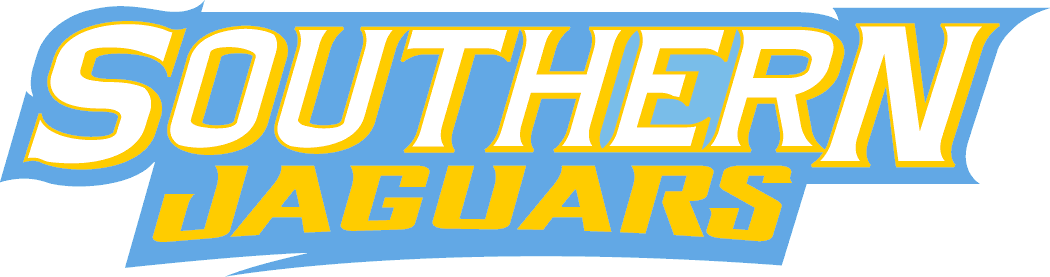
- Conference: Southwestern Athletic Conference
- West Division
- Record: 4–7 (3–6 SWAC)
- Head coach: Stump Mitchell (3rd season; first 2 games); Dawson Odums (interim, final 9 games)
- Defensive coordinator: Dawson Odums
- Home stadium: A. W. Mumford Stadium

2012 Southwestern Athletic Conference football standings
	Conf.			Overall
Team	W		L	W		L
East Division
Jackson State xy	7	–	2	7	–	5
Alabama State	7	–	2	7	–	4
Alabama A&M	6	–	3	7	–	4
Mississippi Valley State	5	–	4	5	–	6
Alcorn State	4	–	5	4	–	7
West Division
Arkansas–Pine Bluff xy$	8	–	1	10	–	2
Prairie View A&M	3	–	6	3	–	8
Southern	3	–	6	4	–	7
Texas Southern *	2	–	7	2	–	9
Grambling State	0	–	9	1	–	10
Championship: Arkansas–Pine Bluff 24, Jackson State 21 ^{OT}
$ – Conference champion; x – Division champion/co-champions; y – Championship game participant; * – ineligible for postseason

The 2012 Southern Jaguars football team represented Southern University as a member of the West Division of the Southwestern Athletic Conference (SWAC) during the 2012 NCAA Division I FCS football season. The Jaguars were led by third-year head coach Stump Mitchell out the outset of the season, but after an 0–2 start, Mitchell was fired and defensive coordinator Dawson Odums was named interim head coach for the rest of the season. The Jaguars played their home games at Ace W. Mumford Stadium. They finished the season with an overall record of 4–7 and mark of 3–6 in conference play, tying for second place in the SWAC's West Division.

== Schedule ==
Date	Time	Opponent	Site	TV	Result	Attendance
September 1	4:00 pm	at New Mexico*	University Stadium; Albuquerque, NM		L 21–66	28,450
September 13	6:30 pm	Mississippi Valley State	A. W. Mumford Stadium; Baton Rouge, LA	ESPNU	L 0–6	7,788
September 22	4:00 pm	at Jackson State	Mississippi Veterans Memorial Stadium; Jackson, MS (rivalry)		W 28–21	20,713
September 29	2:30 pm	vs. Florida A&M*	Georgia Dome; Atlanta, GA (Atlanta Football Classic)	NBCSN	W 21–14	41,042
October 6	2:00 pm	at Alcorn State	Casem-Spinks Stadium; Lorman, MS	ESPN3	L 17–20	15,000
October 13	5:30 pm	Texas Southern^{†}	A. W. Mumford Stadium; Baton Rouge, LA	SWAC TV / CST (tape delay)	W 34–7	18,719
October 20	6:00 pm	Arkansas–Pine Bluff	A. W. Mumford Stadium; Baton Rouge, LA	CST (tape delay)	L 21–50	13,500
October 27	4:00 pm	at Prairie View A&M	Independence Stadium; Shreveport, LA (Shreveport Classic)		L 29–49	12,223
November 3	1:00 pm	at Alabama A&M	Louis Crews Stadium; Huntsville, AL		L 23–24 ^{OT}	10,208
November 10	6:00 pm	Alabama State	A. W. Mumford Stadium; Baton Rouge, LA	CST (tape delay)	L 30–31	14,220
November 24	1:30 pm	vs. Grambling State	Mercedes-Benz Superdome; New Orleans, LA (Bayou Classic)	NBC	W 38–33	45,980
*Non-conference game; ^{†}Homecoming; All times are in Central time

== Media ==
All Southern Jaguars football games were broadcast on KQXL-FM 106.5 with Chris Powers (play-by-play), Gerald Kimble (analyst), and Eric Randall (sideline) calling the Jaguar Action.
