= 2012 Texas Southern Tigers football team =

American college football season

2012 Texas Southern Tigers football
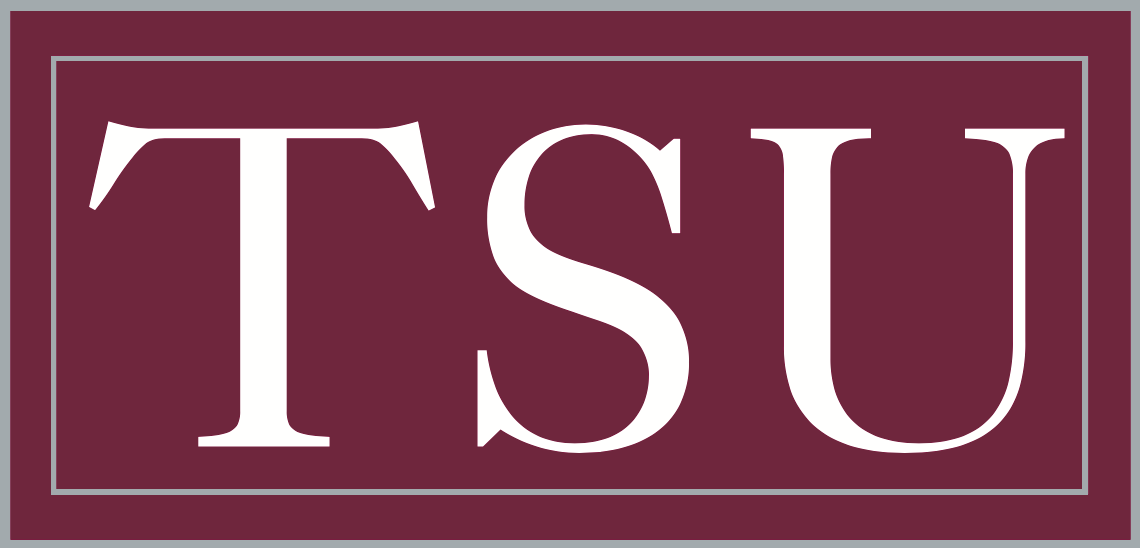
- Conference: Southwestern Athletic Conference
- West Division
- Record: 2–9 (2–7 SWAC)
- Head coach: Darrell Asberry (1st season)
- Offensive coordinator: Darrell Asberry (1st season)
- Co-defensive coordinators: Greg Johnson (1st season); Kevin Ramsey (3rd season)
- Home stadium: BBVA Compass Stadium

2012 Southwestern Athletic Conference football standings
	Conf.			Overall
Team	W		L	W		L
East Division
Jackson State xy	7	–	2	7	–	5
Alabama State	7	–	2	7	–	4
Alabama A&M	6	–	3	7	–	4
Mississippi Valley State	5	–	4	5	–	6
Alcorn State	4	–	5	4	–	7
West Division
Arkansas–Pine Bluff xy$	8	–	1	10	–	2
Prairie View A&M	3	–	6	3	–	8
Southern	3	–	6	4	–	7
Texas Southern *	2	–	7	2	–	9
Grambling State	0	–	9	1	–	10
Championship: Arkansas–Pine Bluff 24, Jackson State 21 ^{OT}
$ – Conference champion; x – Division champion/co-champions; y – Championship game participant; * – ineligible for postseason

The 2012 Texas Southern Tigers football team represented Texas Southern University a member of the West Division of the Southwestern Athletic Conference (SWAC) during the 2012 NCAA Division I FCS football season. Led by first-year head coach Darrell Asberry, the Tigers compiled an overall record of 2–9 with a mark of 2–7 in conference play, placing fourth in the SWAC's West Division. Texas Southern played home games at a new stadium, BBVA Compass Stadium, in Houston.

Texas Southern was barred from postseason football play for the 2012 season due to falling short in fulfilling the NCAA graduation rate requirements.

== Schedule ==
Date	Time	Opponent	Site	TV	Result	Attendance
September 1	7:00 pm	vs. Prairie View A&M	Reliant Stadium; Houston, TX (Labor Day Classic)		W 44–41	22,516
September 8	6:00 pm	at North Texas*	Apogee Stadium; Denton, TX	TXA 21/ESPN3	L 7–31	22,259
September 15	7:30 pm	Jackson State	BBVA Compass Stadium; Houston, TX	KHOU 11.2 Bounce TV	L 35–45	14,623
September 22	11:00 am	Alabama A&M	BBVA Compass Stadium; Houston, TX	KHOU 11.2 Bounce TV / SWAC TV	L 13–42	4,484
September 27	7:00 pm	No. 9 Sam Houston State*	BBVA Compass Stadium; Houston, TX	KHOU 11.2 Bounce TV / CSN Houston (tape delay)	L 6–50	4,443
October 6	1:00 pm	at Alabama State	Cramton Bowl; Montgomery, AL		L 0–45	3,356
October 13	5:30 pm	at Southern	Ace W. Mumford Stadium; Baton Rouge, LA	SWAC TV	L 7–34	18,719
October 27	4:00 pm	Grambling State	BBVA Compass Stadium; Houston, TX	KHOU 11.2 Bounce TV /SWAC TV / CSN Houston (tape delay)	W 23–20	2,966
November 3	2:00 pm	Arkansas–Pine Bluff^{†}	BBVA Compass Stadium; Houston, TX	KHOU 11.2 Bounce TV / CSN Houston (tape delay)	L 3–49	2,968
November 10	2:00 pm	at Alcorn State	Casem-Spinks Stadium; Lorman, MS		L 24–34	4,309
November 17	1:00 pm	Mississippi Valley State	BBVA Compass Stadium; Houston, TX	KHOU 11.2 Bounce TV / CSN Houston (tape delay)	L 3–34	954
*Non-conference game; ^{†}Homecoming; Rankings from The Sports Network Poll released prior to the game; All times are in Central time

== Game summaries ==
=== Prairie View A&M ===
Team	1	2	3	4	Total
Panthers	20	7	7	7	41
• Tigers	7	10	21	6	44

- Date: September 1
- Location: Reliant Stadium
  Houston, TX
- Game start: 7:00 PM CST
- Elapsed time: 3:30
- Game attendance: 22,516
- Game weather: clear, Indoors
- Referee: Eddie Kelley

Texas Southern holds an 18–8 advantage in the Labor Day Classic, but Prairie View A&M had won the most recent 5 games headed into this game.

=== North Texas ===
Team	1	2	3	4	Total
Tigers	0	0	7	0	7
• Mean Green	7	10	3	14	34

- Date: September 8
- Location: Apogee Stadium
  Denton, TX
- Game start: 6:00 PM CST
- Elapsed time: 3:18
- Game attendance: 22,259
- Game weather: 85 °F (29 °C), clear, winds NE 13 mph
- Referee: Perry Havener
- TV announcers (ESPN3): Dave Barnett and Doug Anderson

North Texas and Texas Southern met for the first time in the schools' histories.

=== Jackson State ===
Team	1	2	3	4	Total
• JSU Tigers	7	7	17	14	45
TSO Tigers	7	14	0	14	35

- Date: September 15
- Location: BBVA Compass Stadium
  Houston, TX
- Game start: 7:30 PM CST
- Elapsed time: 3:15
- Game attendance: 14,623
- Game weather: light rain
- Referee: Anthony Johnson
- TV announcers (KHOU 11.2): Nick Strong and Lamont Williams

=== Alabama A&M ===
Alabama A&M at Texas Southern

Team	1	2	3	4	Total
• Bulldogs	14	14	7	7	42
Tigers	6	0	0	7	13

- Date: September 22
- Location: BBVA Compass Stadium
  Houston, TX
- Game start: 11:00 AM CST
- Elapsed time: 3:01
- Game attendance: 4,484
- Game weather: 91 °F (33 °C), Clear Skies, Calm
- Referee: George McCullum
- TV announcers (KHOU 11.2): Nick Strong and Lamont Williams

=== Sam Houston State ===
The Tigers and Bearkats play each other for the first time since 1997. The Bearkats look to build on an 8–5 record they have against the Tigers. The Bearkats won the most recent meeting in 1997 and have won 4 of the last 5 and 8 of the last 10.

#9 Sam Houston State at Texas Southern

Team	1	2	3	4	Total
• #9 Bearkats	14	19	7	10	50
Tigers	0	6	0	0	6

- Date: September 27
- Location: BBVA Compass Stadium
  Houston, TX
- Game start: 7:05 PM CST
- Elapsed time: 2:50
- Game attendance: 4,443
- Game weather: 87 °F (31 °C), Partly Cloudy
- Referee: Anthony Johnson
- TV announcers (KHOU 11.2): Nick Strong and Lamont Williams

=== Alabama State ===
Texas Southern at Alabama State

Team	1	2	3	4	Total
Tigers	0	0	0	0	0
• Hornets	0	21	3	21	45

- Date: October 6
- Location: Cramton Bowl
  Montgomery, AL
- Game start: 1:00 PM CST
- Elapsed time: 2:50
- Game attendance: 3,356
- Referee: Anthony Johnson

=== Southern ===
Texas Southern at Southern

Team	1	2	3	4	Total
Tigers	0	0	0	7	7
• Jaguars	10	10	7	7	34

- Date: October 13
- Location: Ace W. Mumford Stadium
  Baton Rouge, LA
- Game start: 5:37 PM CST
- Elapsed time: 2:58
- Game attendance: 18,719
- Game weather: 88 °F (31 °C), Clear
- Referee: George McCullum
- Television network: SWAC TV

=== Grambling State ===
Grambling at Texas Southern

Team	1	2	3	4	Total
GSU Tigers	0	14	6	0	20
• TSU Tigers	7	7	0	9	23

- Date: October 27
- Location: BBVA Compass Stadium
  Houston, TX
- Game start: 4:05 PM CST
- Elapsed time: 3:01
- Game attendance: 2,966
- Referee: George McCullum
- TV announcers (KHOU 11.2): Nick Strong and Lamont Williams

=== Arkansas–Pine Bluff ===
Arkansas–Pine Bluff at Texas Southern

Team	1	2	3	4	Total
• Golden Lions	7	14	21	7	49
Tigers	3	0	0	0	3

- Date: November 3
- Location: BBVA Compass Stadium
  Houston, TX
- Game start: 2:00 PM CST
- Elapsed time: 3:51
- Game attendance: 2,968
- Game weather: 81 °F (27 °C), Partly Cloudy
- Referee: Eddie Kelley
- TV announcers (KHOU 11.2): Nick Strong and Lamont Williams

=== Alcorn State ===
Texas Southern at Alcorn State

Team	1	2	3	4	Total
Tigers	0	10	7	7	24
• Braves	7	7	7	13	34

- Date: November 10
- Location: Jack Spinks Stadium
  Lorman, MS
- Game start: 2:00 CST
- Elapsed time: 3:10
- Game attendance: 4,300
- Game weather: 71°, Sunny
- Referee: Rod Holloway

=== Mississippi Valley State ===
Mississippi Valley State at Texas Southern

Team	1	2	3	4	Total
• Delta Devils	14	13	7	0	34
Tigers	0	3	0	0	3

- Date: November 17
- Location: BBVA Compass Stadium
  Houston, TX
- Game start: 1:00 CST
- Elapsed time: 3:15
- Game attendance: 954
- Referee: Roderick Hollow
- TV announcers (KHOU 11.2): Nick Strong and Lamont Williams

== Personnel ==
=== Roster ===
2012 Texas Southern Tigers football team roster
Players
Coaches
Offense

Pos.	#	Name	Class
QB	4	Dantavious Parker	Sr
QB	7	Justice Jones	Fr
QB	10	Jeff Anderson	Jr
QB	13	Riko Smalls	Sr
QB	14	Rudy Johnson	Fr

Defense

Pos.	#	Name	Class

Special teams

Pos.	#	Name	Class
K	15	Robert Hersh	Sr
P	99	Wilbert Ortis	So

Head coach

- Darrell Asberry

Coordinators/assistant coaches

- Carl Roberts
  Asst. head coach/offensive line
- Greg Johnson
  Associate head coach/co-defensive Coordinator/Cornerbacks
- Kevin Ramsey
  Defensive coordinator
- David Geralds
  Defensive line
- Ellis Herring
  Linebackers
- Greg Ruffin
  Tight ends/recruiting coordinator
- Grailyn Pratt
  Quarterbacks
- TC Taylor
  Wide receivers
- Lewis Tillman
  Running Backs

- Gino Simoni
  Grad Assistant- Offense
- Marc Orphey
  Grad Assistant- Strength & Conditioning
- Kimberly Evans
  Football Academic Advisor
- Kenny Burrough
  Athletic Development

Legend

- (C) Team captain
- (S) Suspended
- (I) Ineligible
- Injured
- Redshirt

Roster

=== Recruits ===
14 players signed up to join the 2012 Texas Southern team.

College recruiting information
Name	Hometown	School	Height	Weight	Commit date
Rudofo "Rudy" Alonzo; RB	Corpus Christi, TX	Corpus King	5 ft 9 in (1.75 m)	185 lb (84 kg)	
Rudofo "Rudy" Alonzo; RB	Recruit ratings: No ratings found				
Zach Bamijoko; LB	Missouri City, TX	Elkins	6 ft 0 in (1.83 m)	247 lb (112 kg)	
Zach Bamijoko; LB	Recruit ratings: No ratings found				
Darius Callies; WR	Edna, TX	Edna	5 ft 11 in (1.80 m)	180 lb (82 kg)	
Darius Callies; WR	Recruit ratings: No ratings found				
Brandon Charles; OL	Corinth, TX	Lake Dallas	6 ft 3 in (1.91 m)	290 lb (130 kg)	
Brandon Charles; OL	Recruit ratings: No ratings found				
Zachary Faires; TE	Edinburg, TX	Edinburg	6 ft 3 in (1.91 m)	220 lb (100 kg)	
Zachary Faires; TE	Recruit ratings: No ratings found				
Justice Jones; QB	Patterson, LA	Patterson	6 ft 0 in (1.83 m)	185 lb (84 kg)	
Justice Jones; QB	Recruit ratings: No ratings found				
Elston Lane Jr. WR	Miami, FL	Miami Northwestern	6 ft 0 in (1.83 m)	190 lb (86 kg)	
Elston Lane Jr. WR	Recruit ratings: (78)				
Derrick McWilliams; DE	Houston, TX	New Mexico Military Institute	6 ft 3 in (1.91 m)	260 lb (120 kg)	
Derrick McWilliams; DE	Recruit ratings: No ratings found				
Jarius Moore; LB	Houston, TX	North Shore	5 ft 11 in (1.80 m)	220 lb (100 kg)	
Jarius Moore; LB	Recruit ratings: No ratings found				
Jaquaa Peters; WR	Columbia, MO	Pearl River CC	5 ft 10 in (1.78 m)	180 lb (82 kg)	
Jaquaa Peters; WR	Recruit ratings: No ratings found				
Frederick Plummer; WR	Memphis, TN	Coahoma CC	6 ft 0 in (1.83 m)	190 lb (86 kg)	
Frederick Plummer; WR	Recruit ratings: No ratings found				
Billy Rosenberg; TE	Memphis, TN	Memphis Raleigh-Egypt	6 ft 5 in (1.96 m)	230 lb (100 kg)	
Billy Rosenberg; TE	Recruit ratings: No ratings found				
Darius Taylor; OL	Houston, TX	North Shore	6 ft 3 in (1.91 m)	290 lb (130 kg)	
Darius Taylor; OL	Recruit ratings: No ratings found				
Daryl Jones, Jr. RB	Jackson, MS	Callaway	5 ft 9 in (1.75 m)	185 lb (84 kg)	
Daryl Jones, Jr. RB	Recruit ratings: No ratings found				
Overall recruit ranking: Scout: Not Ranked Rivals: Not Ranked ESPN: Not Ranked
Note: In many cases, Scout, Rivals, 247Sports, On3, and ESPN may conflict in their listings of height and weight.; In these cases, the average was taken. ESPN grades are on a 100-point scale.; Sources: "2012 Player Commitments - Texas Southern". ESPN.; "2012 Team Ranking". Rivals.com.

== Media ==
Texas Southern football games were carried live on KTSU 90.9 FM.
