= 2014 Prairie View A&M Panthers football team =

American college football season

2014 Prairie View A&M Panthers football
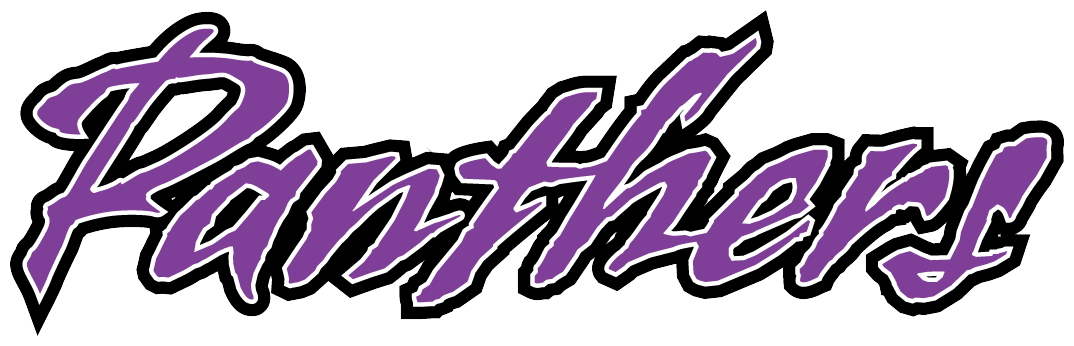
- Conference: Southwestern Athletic Conference
- West Division
- Record: 5–5 (5–4 SWAC)
- Head coach: Heishma Northern (4th season)
- Offensive coordinator: Mark Orlando (4th season)
- Defensive coordinator: Charles McMillian (2nd season)
- Home stadium: Edward L. Blackshear Field

2014 Southwestern Athletic Conference football standings
	Conf.			Overall
Team	W		L	W		L
East Division
Alcorn State x$	7	–	2	10	–	3
Alabama State *	5	–	4	7	–	5
Jackson State	3	–	6	5	–	7
Alabama A&M	3	–	6	4	–	8
Mississippi Valley State *	1	–	8	2	–	9
West Division
Southern xy	8	–	1	9	–	4
Grambling State	7	–	2	7	–	5
Prairie View A&M *	5	–	4	5	–	5
Texas Southern	3	–	6	5	–	6
Arkansas–Pine Bluff *	3	–	6	4	–	7
Championship: Alcorn State 38, Southern 24
$ – Conference champion; x – Division champion/co-champions; y – Championship game participant; * – ineligible for postseason due to APR violations

The 2014 Prairie View A&M Panthers football team represented Prairie View A&M University in the 2014 NCAA Division I FCS football season. The Panthers were led by fourth year head coach Heishma Northern and played their home games at Edward L. Blackshear Field. They were a member of the West Division of the Southwestern Athletic Conference (SWAC). They finished the season 5–5, 5–4 in SWAC play to finish in third place in the West Division.

On November 17, head coach Heishma Northern was fired. He finished at Prairie View A&M with a four year record of 19–25.

== Schedule ==
Date	Time	Opponent	Site	Result	Attendance
August 31	4:00 pm	vs. Texas Southern	NRG Stadium; Houston, TX (Labor Day Classic)	L 35–37	19,189
September 13	6:00 pm	at No. 6 McNeese State*	Cowboy Stadium; Lake Charles, LA	L 16–48	17,469
September 20	6:00 pm	Southern	Edward L. Blackshear Field; Prairie View, TX	L 24–34	4,762
September 27	4:00 pm	vs. Grambling State	Cotton Bowl; Dallas, TX (State Fair Classic)	L 20–26	32,877
October 4	6:00 pm	at Jackson State	Mississippi Veterans Memorial Stadium; Jackson, MS	W 48–30	7,881
October 11	2:00 pm	Alabama State^{†}	Edward L. Blackshear Field; Prairie View, TX	W 34–24	6,257
October 18	2:00 pm	at Mississippi Valley State	Rice–Totten Field; Itta Bena, MS	W 52–19	7,829
October 25	1:00 pm	Alcorn State	Edward L. Blackshear Field; Prairie View, TX	L 48–77	3,116
November 8	2:30 pm	at Arkansas–Pine Bluff	Golden Lion Stadium; Pine Bluff, AR	W 51–23	12,337
November 15	1:00 pm	at Alabama A&M	Louis Crews Stadium; Huntsville, AL	W 38–35	3,300
*Non-conference game; ^{†}Homecoming; Rankings from The Sports Network Poll released prior to the game; All times are in Central time
