= 2014 Alabama State Hornets football team =

American college football season

2014 Alabama State Hornets football
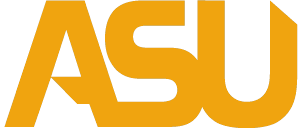
- Conference: Southwestern Athletic Conference
- East Division
- Record: 7–5 (5–4 SWAC)
- Head coach: Reggie Barlow (8th season)
- Offensive coordinator: Fred Kaiss (4th season)
- Defensive coordinator: Kevin Ramsey (2nd season)
- Home stadium: New ASU Stadium

2014 Southwestern Athletic Conference football standings
	Conf.			Overall
Team	W		L	W		L
East Division
Alcorn State x$	7	–	2	10	–	3
Alabama State *	5	–	4	7	–	5
Jackson State	3	–	6	5	–	7
Alabama A&M	3	–	6	4	–	8
Mississippi Valley State *	1	–	8	2	–	9
West Division
Southern xy	8	–	1	9	–	4
Grambling State	7	–	2	7	–	5
Prairie View A&M *	5	–	4	5	–	5
Texas Southern	3	–	6	5	–	6
Arkansas–Pine Bluff *	3	–	6	4	–	7
Championship: Alcorn State 38, Southern 24
$ – Conference champion; x – Division champion/co-champions; y – Championship game participant; * – ineligible for postseason due to APR violations

The 2014 Alabama State Hornets football team represented Alabama State University as a member of the East Division of the Southwestern Athletic Conference (SWAC) during 2014 NCAA Division I FCS football season. Led by Reggie Barlow in his eighth and final season as head coach, the Hornets compiled an overall record of 7–5 with a mark of 5–4 in conference play, placing second in the SWAC East Division. Alabama State played home games at New ASU Stadium in Montgomery, Alabama.

On November 24, Barlow was fired. He finished his tenure at Alabama State with a record of 49–42.

== Schedule ==
Date	Time	Opponent	Site	TV	Result	Attendance
August 30	6:30 pm	at No. 17 Sam Houston State*	Bowers Stadium; Huntsville, TX		L 20–51	7,595
September 6	4:00 pm	No. 14 Tennessee State*	New ASU Stadium; Montgomery, AL	ASPiRE	W 27–21	15,725
September 13	5:00 pm	Mississippi Valley State	New ASU Stadium; Montgomery, AL		W 47–22	13,865
September 18	6:30 pm	Arkansas–Pine Bluff	New ASU Stadium; Montgomery, AL	ESPNU	W 42–7	7,902
September 27	5:00 pm	Texas Southern	New ASU Stadium; Montgomery, AL		W 38–3	8,014
October 2	6:30 pm	at Alcorn State	Casem-Spinks Stadium; Lorman, MS	ESPNU	L 7–33	5,797
October 11	2:00 pm	at Prairie View A&M	Edward L. Blackshear Field; Prairie View, TX		L 24–34	6,257
October 25	2:30 pm	vs. Alabama A&M	Legion Field; Birmingham, AL (Magic City Classic)		L 36–37	67,710
November 1	6:00 pm	at Southern	Ace W. Mumford Stadium; Baton Rouge, LA		L 21–28	15,400
November 8	1:00 pm	Jackson State	New ASU Stadium; Montgomery, AL		W 26–10	17,560
November 15	2:00 pm	at Grambling State	Eddie Robinson Stadium; Grambling, LA		W 37–23	7,000
November 22	1:00 pm	Stillman*^{†}	New ASU Stadium; Montgomery, AL (Turkey Day Classic)		W 30–27	13,156
*Non-conference game; ^{†}Homecoming; Rankings from The Sports Network Poll released prior to the game; All times are in Central time
