= 2012 Prairie View A&M Panthers football team =

American college football season

2012 Prairie View A&M Panthers football
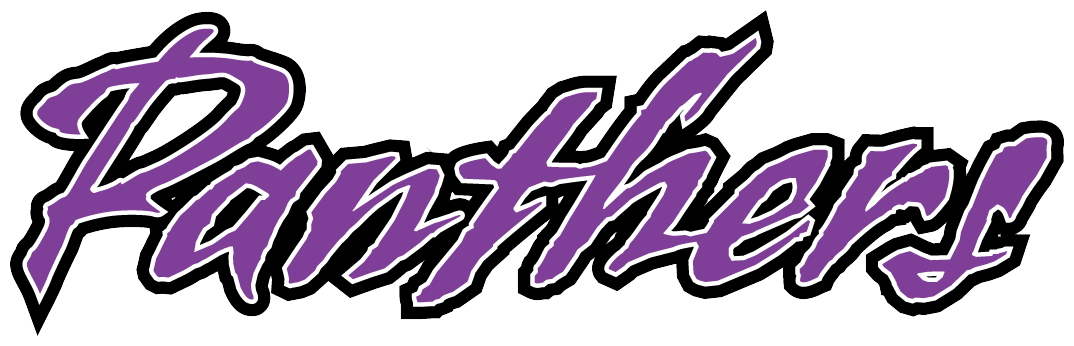
- Conference: Southwestern Athletic Conference
- West Division
- Record: 3–8 (3–6 SWAC)
- Head coach: Heishma Northern (2nd season)
- Offensive coordinator: Mark Orlando
- Defensive coordinator: John Pearce
- Home stadium: Edward L. Blackshear Field

2012 Southwestern Athletic Conference football standings
	Conf.			Overall
Team	W		L	W		L
East Division
Jackson State xy	7	–	2	7	–	5
Alabama State	7	–	2	7	–	4
Alabama A&M	6	–	3	7	–	4
Mississippi Valley State	5	–	4	5	–	6
Alcorn State	4	–	5	4	–	7
West Division
Arkansas–Pine Bluff xy$	8	–	1	10	–	2
Prairie View A&M	3	–	6	3	–	8
Southern	3	–	6	4	–	7
Texas Southern *	2	–	7	2	–	9
Grambling State	0	–	9	1	–	10
Championship: Arkansas–Pine Bluff 24, Jackson State 21 ^{OT}
$ – Conference champion; x – Division champion/co-champions; y – Championship game participant; * – ineligible for postseason

The 2012 Prairie View A&M Panthers football team represented Prairie View A&M University in the 2012 NCAA Division I FCS football season. The Panthers were led by second year head coach Heishma Northern and played their home games at Edward L. Blackshear Field. They were a member of the West Division of the Southwestern Athletic Conference (SWAC) and finished the season with an overall record of three wins and eight losses (3–8, 3–6 SWAC).

== Media ==
All Prairie View A&M games were carried live on KPVU 91.3 FM.

== Before the season ==
=== 2012 recruits ===
12 players signed up to join the 2012 Prairie View A&M team.

College recruiting information (2012)
Name	Hometown	School	Height	Weight	Commit date
Malcolm Ajayi; DB	Sacramento, CA	Contra Costa College	5 ft 10 in (1.78 m)	195 lb (88 kg)	
Malcolm Ajayi; DB	Recruit ratings: No ratings found				
Edward Brown; DE	New Iberia, LA	Westgate	6 ft 3 in (1.91 m)	220 lb (100 kg)	
Edward Brown; DE	Recruit ratings: No ratings found				
James Burch III; WR	Houston, TX	Cy Ridge	5 ft 7 in (1.70 m)	170 lb (77 kg)	
James Burch III; WR	Recruit ratings: No ratings found				
Donald Drisdom; WR	Los Angeles, CA	West LA CC	6 ft 1 in (1.85 m)	190 lb (86 kg)	
Donald Drisdom; WR	Recruit ratings: No ratings found				
Josiah Freeman; OL	Baton Rouge, LA	Scotlandville	6 ft 4 in (1.93 m)	280 lb (130 kg)	
Josiah Freeman; OL	Recruit ratings: No ratings found				
Trey Green; QB	Beaumont, TX	Ozen	6 ft 2 in (1.88 m)	190 lb (86 kg)	
Trey Green; QB	Recruit ratings: No ratings found				
Johnta Herbert; ATH	Baton Rouge, LA	Glen Oaks	5 ft 10 in (1.78 m)	195 lb (88 kg)	
Johnta Herbert; ATH	Recruit ratings: No ratings found				
Darrien Patterson; DE	Culver City, CA	West LA CC	6 ft 3 in (1.91 m)	240 lb (110 kg)	
Darrien Patterson; DE	Recruit ratings: No ratings found				
Chris Rose; OL	Houston, TX	Madison	6 ft 3 in (1.91 m)	290 lb (130 kg)	
Chris Rose; OL	Recruit ratings: No ratings found				
Christian Rousseau; QB	Miami, FL	Hialeah	6 ft 2 in (1.88 m)	185 lb (84 kg)	
Christian Rousseau; QB	Recruit ratings: No ratings found				
Cleveland Sims; OT	Houston, TX	Madison	6 ft 5 in (1.96 m)	280 lb (130 kg)	
Cleveland Sims; OT	Recruit ratings: No ratings found				
Archiel Townsend; OG	Clute, TX	Brazoswood	6 ft 2 in (1.88 m)	280 lb (130 kg)	
Archiel Townsend; OG	Recruit ratings: No ratings found				
Overall recruit ranking: Scout: Not Ranked Rivals: Not Ranked ESPN: Not Ranked
Note: In many cases, Scout, Rivals, 247Sports, On3, and ESPN may conflict in their listings of height and weight.; In these cases, the average was taken. ESPN grades are on a 100-point scale.; Sources: "2012 Player Commitments - Prairie View A&M". ESPN.; "2012 Team Ranking". Rivals.com.

== Schedule ==
Date	Time	Opponent	Site	TV	Result	Attendance	Source
September 1	7:00 pm	vs. Texas Southern	Reliant Stadium; Houston, TX (Labor Day Classic)		L 41–44	22,516	
September 8	7:00 pm	at Lamar*	Provost Umphrey Stadium; Beaumont, TX		L 0–31	15,367	
September 15	6:00 pm	at Alabama A&M	Louis Crews Stadium; Huntsville, AL (Louis Crews Classic)		L 30–42	5,325	
September 22	3:00 pm	at No. 1 North Dakota State*	Fargodome; Fargo, ND	ESPN3	L 7–66	18,623	
September 29	4:00 pm	at Jackson State	Mississippi Veterans Memorial Stadium; Jackson, MS	SWAC TV	L 13–34	6,566	
October 6	6:00 pm	vs. Grambling State	Cotton Bowl; Dallas, TX (State Fair Classic)		W 31–14	33,123	
October 20	2:00 pm	Alcorn State^{†}	Edward L. Blackshear Field; Prairie View, TX	CSN Houston	W 52–37	12,000	
October 27	4:00 pm	vs. Southern	Independence Stadium; Shreveport, LA (Shreveport Classic)		W 49–29	12,223	
November 3	1:00 pm	Alabama State	Edward L. Blackshear Field; Prairie View, TX		L 21–35	2,348	
November 10	1:00 pm	at Mississippi Valley State	Rice–Totten Field; Itta Bena, MS		L 20–22	2,059	
November 17	2:30 pm	at Arkansas–Pine Bluff	Golden Lion Stadium; Pine Bluff, AR		L 41–42	3,088	
*Non-conference game; ^{†}Homecoming; Rankings from The Sports Network Poll released prior to the game; All times are in Central time

== Game summaries ==
=== Texas Southern ===
Team	1	2	3	4	Total
Panthers	20	7	7	7	41
• Tigers	7	10	21	6	44

- Date: September 1
- Location: Reliant Stadium
  Houston, TX
- Game start: 7:00 PM CST
- Elapsed time: 3:30
- Game attendance: 22,516
- Game weather: clear, Indoors
- Referee: Eddie Kelley

=== Lamar ===
Team	1	2	3	4	Total
Panthers	0	0	0	0	0
• Cardinals	14	7	3	7	31

- Date: September 8
- Location: Provost Umphrey Stadium
  Beaumont, TX
- Game start: 7:00 PM CST
- Elapsed time: 2:46
- Game attendance: 15,367
- Game weather: 79 °F (26 °C), Overcast, winds NNW at 11mph
- Referee: Ross Smith
- TV announcers (Lamarcardinals.com): Harold Mann and Bo Brown

=== Alabama A&M ===
Team	1	2	3	4	Total
• Panthers	7	14	6	13	40
Bulldogs	7	14	3	14	38

- Date: September 15
- Location: Louis Crews Stadium
  Huntsville, AL
- Game start: 6:00 PM CST
- Elapsed time: 2:57
- Game attendance: 5,325
- Game weather: 75 °F (24 °C), Clear and Warm, winds NW at 5mph
- Referee: Anthony Johnson

=== North Dakota State ===
Team	1	2	3	4	Total
Panthers	0	0	0	7	7
• Bison	17	28	14	7	66

- Date: September 22
- Location: Fargodome
  Fargo, ND
- Game start: 3:07 PM CST
- Elapsed time: 2:51
- Game attendance: 18,623
- Game weather: 70 °F (21 °C), Indoors
- Referee: Rich Wasik
- TV announcers (ESPN3): Brian Shawn and Kevin Fenney

=== Jackson State ===
Team	1	2	3	4	Total
Panthers	7	3	3	0	13
• Tigers	0	0	20	14	34

- Date: September 29
- Location: Mississippi Veterans Memorial Stadium
  Jackson, MS
- Game start: 4:00 PM CST
- Elapsed time: 2:54
- Game attendance: 6,556
- Game weather: Overcast
- Referee: V. Breakfield
- Television network: SWAC TV

=== Grambling State ===
Team	1	2	3	4	Total
Tigers	7	7	0	0	14
• Panthers	10	7	7	7	31

- Date: October 6
- Location: Cotton Bowl
  Dallas, TX
- Game start: 6:00 PM CST
- Elapsed time: 3:22
- Game attendance: 33,123
- Game weather: 56 °F (13 °C), Cloudy Skies, winds NNE at 9mph
- Referee: R. Holloway

=== Alcorn State ===
Team	1	2	3	4	Total
Braves	0	10	14	13	37
• Panthers	10	14	14	14	52

- Date: October 20
- Location: Edward L. Blackshear Field
  Prairie View, TX
- Game start: 2:36 PM CST
- Elapsed time: 3:14
- Game attendance: 12,000
- Game weather: 82 °F (28 °C), Partly Cloudy, winds SSE at 11mph
- Referee: Eddie Kelley
- TV announcers (CSN Houston): Dave Raymond and N. D. Kalu

=== Southern ===
Team	1	2	3	4	Total
• Panthers	7	14	7	21	49
Jaguars	0	10	19	0	29

- Date: October 27
- Location: Independence Stadium
  Shreveport, LA
- Game start: 4:00 PM CST
- Elapsed time: 3:15
- Game attendance: 12,223
- Game weather: 55 °F (13 °C), Sunny
- Referee: V. Breakfield

=== Alabama State ===
Team	1	2	3	4	Total
• Hornets	0	20	0	15	35
Panthers	14	0	7	0	21

- Date: November 3
- Location: Edward L. Blackshear Field
  Prairie View, TX
- Game attendance: 2,348

=== Mississippi Valley State ===
Team	1	2	3	4	Total
Panthers	7	10	3	0	20
• Delta Devils	0	10	0	12	22

- Date: November 10
- Location: Rice–Totten Field
  Itta Bena, MS
- Game start: 1:00 CST
- Elapsed time: 2:55
- Game attendance: 2,059
- Game weather: 73°, Clear
- Referee: McCullum, George

=== Arkansas–Pine Bluff ===
Team	1	2	3	4	Total
Panthers	7	20	7	7	41
• Golden Lions	21	14	7	0	42

- Date: November 17
- Location: Golden Lion Stadium
  Pine Bluff, AR
- Game start: 2:30 CST
- Elapsed time: 2:53
- Game attendance: 3,088
- Game weather: 62°, Clear
- Referee: Vi. Breakfield

== Roster ==
2012 Prairie View Panthers football team roster
Players			Coaches
Offense: Pos. / # / Name / Class	Defense: Pos. / # / Name / Class	Special teams: Pos. / # / Name / Class	Head coach: Heishma Northern (Grambling State); Coordinators/assistant coaches: Prince Pearson (Minnesota) Asst. head coach/Offensive Line; Mark Orlando (Florida State) Offensive coordinator/quarterbacks; John Pearce (Bowie State) Defensive coordinator/linebackers; Miles Brandon (Ohio) Defensive line; Raasaan Haralson (Southern) Cornerbacks; Brian Morgan (Grambling State) Running backs/recruiting coordinator/Kickers; Harry Williams (Prairie View A&M) Wide receivers; Bubba McDowell (Miami (FL)) Safeties; Gabe Northern (LSU) Defensive line/strength & conditioning/special teams; Ed Moore (Prairie View A&M) Defensive quality control; Ted Smith (Prairie View A&M) Defensive graduate assistant; Anthony Weeden (Prairie View A&M) Offensive quality control; K. J. Black (Prairie View A&M) Offensive graduate assistant; Brady Faggard (Prairie View A&M) Defensive student assistant; Clyde Edwards (Grambling State) Offensive student assistant; Legend: (C) Team captain; (S) Suspended; (I) Ineligible; Injured; Redshirt; Roster
