= 2012 Mississippi Valley State Delta Devils football team =

American college football season

2012 Mississippi Valley State Delta Devils football
- Conference: Southwestern Athletic Conference
- East Division
- Record: 5–6 (5–4 SWAC)
- Head coach: Karl Morgan (3rd season)
- Offensive coordinator: Ramon Flanigan (3rd season)
- Home stadium: Rice–Totten Stadium

2012 Southwestern Athletic Conference football standings
| | Conf. | | | Overall |
| Team | W | | L | W | | L |
|---|---|---|---|---|---|---|
East Division
| Jackson State xy | 7 | – | 2 | 7 | – | 5 |
| Alabama State | 7 | – | 2 | 7 | – | 4 |
| Alabama A&M | 6 | – | 3 | 7 | – | 4 |
| Mississippi Valley State | 5 | – | 4 | 5 | – | 6 |
| Alcorn State | 4 | – | 5 | 4 | – | 7 |
West Division
| Arkansas–Pine Bluff xy$ | 8 | – | 1 | 10 | – | 2 |
| Prairie View A&M | 3 | – | 6 | 3 | – | 8 |
| Southern | 3 | – | 6 | 4 | – | 7 |
| Texas Southern * | 2 | – | 7 | 2 | – | 9 |
| Grambling State | 0 | – | 9 | 1 | – | 10 |
Championship: Arkansas–Pine Bluff 24, Jackson State 21 ^{OT}
$ – Conference champion; x – Division champion/co-champions; y – Championship game participant; * – ineligible for postseason

The 2012 Mississippi Valley State Delta Devils football team represented Mississippi Valley State University as a member of the East Division of the Southwestern Athletic Conference (SWAC) during the 2012 NCAA Division I FCS football season. Led by third-year head coach Karl Morgan, the Delta Devils compiled an overall record of 5–6 and a mark of 5–4 in conference play, placing fourth in the SWAC's East Division. Mississippi Valley State played home games at Rice–Totten Stadium in Itta Bena, Mississippi.

== Schedule ==
| Date | Time | Opponent | Site | TV | Result | Attendance |
|---|---|---|---|---|---|---|
| September 1 | 5:00 pm | Concordia (AL)* | Rice–Totten Stadium; Itta Bena, MS | | L 19–20 | 3,092 |
| September 8 | 1:00 pm | at Alabama State | Cramton Bowl; Montgomery, AL | | L 7–29 | 11,804 |
| September 13 | 6:30 pm | at Southern | A. W. Mumford Stadium; Baton Rouge, LA | ESPNU | W 6–0 | 7,788 |
| September 22 | 6:00 pm | at Northwestern State* | Harry Turpin Stadium; Natchitoches, LA | | L 14–45 | 8,245 |
| October 6 | 2:00 pm | Alabama A&M | Rice–Totten Stadium; Itta Bena, MS | | L 0–35 | 4,296 |
| October 13 | 2:00 pm | Grambling State | Rice–Totten Stadium; Itta Bena, MS | | W 45–21 | 4,076 |
| October 20 | 3:00 pm | at Jackson State | Mississippi Veterans Memorial Stadium; Jackson, MS | SWAC TV | L 7–14 ^{2OT} | 10,000 |
| October 27 | 2:30 pm | at Arkansas–Pine Bluff | Golden Lion Stadium; Pine Bluff, AR | | L 0–10 | 14,604 |
| November 3 | 1:00 pm | Alcorn State^{†} | Rice–Totten Stadium; Itta Bena, MS | | W 33–9 | 6,708 |
| November 10 | 1:00 pm | Prairie View A&M | Rice–Totten Stadium; Itta Bena, MS | | W 22–20 | 2,059 |
| November 17 | 1:00 pm | at Texas Southern | BBVA Compass Stadium; Houston, TX | | W 34–3 | 954 |
*Non-conference game; ^{†}Homecoming; All times are in Central time

== Media ==
All Delta Devils games were carried live on WVSD radio.
