= Jack Spinks =

American football player (1930–1994)

No. 37, 61, 62, 68
- Positions: Fullback, guard, tackle

Personal information
- Born: February 4, 1930; Toomsuba, Mississippi, U.S.
- Died: September 29, 1994 (aged 64); Jackson, Mississippi, U.S.
- Listed height: 6 ft 0 in (1.83 m)
- Listed weight: 236 lb (107 kg)

Career information
- College: Alcorn A&M
- NFL draft: 1952: 11th round, 126th overall pick

Career history
- Pittsburgh Steelers (1952); Chicago Cardinals (1953); Green Bay Packers (1955–1956); New York Giants (1956–1957)

Awards and highlights
- NFL champion (1956)

Career NFL statistics
- Rushing yards: 94
- Rushing average: 3.4
- Receptions: 3
- Receiving yards: 28
- Stats at Pro Football Reference

John Robert Spinks (August 15, 1930 – September 29, 1994) was an American professional football player who was a fullback for five seasons in the National Football League (NFL). He played college football for the Alcorn A&M Braves (now Alcorn State). He played in the NFL for the Pittsburgh Steelers (1952), Chicago Cardinals (1953), Green Bay Packers (1955–1956), and New York Giants (1956–1957).

Spinks is the namesake of Jack Spinks Stadium, home of the Alcorn State Braves.

== Biography ==
=== Early life ===
John Spinks — known as "Johnny" in his younger years and "Jack" as an adult — was born February 4, 1930, in Toomsuba, Mississippi.

=== College career ===
He attended Alcorn A&M College, a historically black school located in Lorman, Mississippi, where he played fullback for the Braves. Powerfully built and tipping the scales at 220 pounds, Spinks was regarded as a key play]er for the team even as a sophomore during the 1949 season. Spinks helped Alcorn A&M win the South Central Athletic Conference (SCAC) football title in 1949, playing extended minutes and scoring a touchdown in a 45–6 drubbing of Rust College of Holly Springs, Mississippi in the final conference game of the season. The Braves would finish the season with a record of 7–1–2, their sole blemishes coming in the season's final three games against strong competition.

Head coach Dwight "Red" Fisher led his charges to another successful season in 1950, finishing with a record of 8–2 while outscoring their opponents 319 points to just 68. Spinks was already being recognized as a potential All-America team prospect, as a "big" 215-pounder "who combines speed and courage with his weight" and who was "hard to stop and a consistent ground gainer."

Alcorn A&M's record of 8 wins and 2 losses would be repeated during Spinks' senior season of 1951, with the team again rattling off seven conference wins before running into trouble late in the season.

=== Professional career ===
Jack Spinks (#37), was the only African-American player on the 1952 Pittsburgh Steelers squad.

Spinks was selected by the Pittsburgh Steelers of the National Football League (NFL) in the 11th round of the 1952 NFL draft, with the team making him the 126th overall selection.

During his 1952 rookie season, Spinks — the only black player on the Pittsburgh roster — was used primarily in a blocking capacity at fullback. Although he saw action in 10 games, starting 3 of them, he carried the ball just 22 times for 94 yards, with his long carry going for a 42 yard gain. Ironically, these would be the only rushing yards gained in a five year NFL career.

As the 1953 season approached, he remained on the Steelers' roster, scoring a touchdown in a September 9 preseason game against the Washington Redskins on a 10 yard run.
