= 2014 Grambling State Tigers football team =

American college football season

2014 Grambling State Tigers football
- Conference: Southwestern Athletic Conference
- West Division
- Record: 7–5 (7–2 SWAC)
- Head coach: Broderick Fobbs (1st season)
- Offensive coordinator: Eric Dooley (1st season)
- Defensive coordinator: Everett Todd (1st season)
- Home stadium: Eddie Robinson Stadium

2014 Southwestern Athletic Conference football standings
	Conf.			Overall
Team	W		L	W		L
East Division
Alcorn State x$	7	–	2	10	–	3
Alabama State *	5	–	4	7	–	5
Jackson State	3	–	6	5	–	7
Alabama A&M	3	–	6	4	–	8
Mississippi Valley State *	1	–	8	2	–	9
West Division
Southern xy	8	–	1	9	–	4
Grambling State	7	–	2	7	–	5
Prairie View A&M *	5	–	4	5	–	5
Texas Southern	3	–	6	5	–	6
Arkansas–Pine Bluff *	3	–	6	4	–	7
Championship: Alcorn State 38, Southern 24
$ – Conference champion; x – Division champion/co-champions; y – Championship game participant; * – ineligible for postseason due to APR violations

The 2014 Grambling State Tigers football team represented Grambling State University in the 2014 NCAA Division I FCS football season. The Tigers were led by head coach Broderick Fobbs in the first season of his tenure as head coach. They competed as a member of the West Division of the Southwestern Athletic Conference (SWAC) and played their home games at Eddie Robinson Stadium in Grambling, Louisiana. They finished the season 7–5, 7–2 in SWAC play to finish in second place in the West Division.

== Schedule ==
Date	Time	Opponent	Site	TV	Result	Attendance
August 30	6:00 pm	at Lamar*	Provost Umphrey Stadium; Beaumont, TX		L 27–42	9,520
September 6	6:00 pm	at Houston*	TDECU Stadium; Houston, TX	ESPN3	L 0–47	30,081
September 13	4:00 pm	at No. 13 Bethune-Cookman*	Municipal Stadium; Daytona Beach, FL		L 23–36	9,423
September 20	6:00 pm	at Jackson State	Veterans Memorial Stadium; Jackson, MS		W 40–35	18,522
September 27	4:30 pm	vs. Prairie View A&M	Cotton Bowl; Dallas, TX (State Fair Classic)		W 26–20	32,877
October 4	6:00 pm	at Alabama A&M	Louis Crews Stadium; Huntsville, AL		W 38–28	21,254
October 11	2:00 pm	Alcorn State	Eddie Robinson Stadium; Grambling, LA	PSB	W 28–21	12,073
October 18	2:00 pm	Arkansas–Pine Bluff^{†}	Eddie Robinson Stadium; Grambling, LA	PSB Live	W 63–39	10,000
November 1	2:00 pm	at Texas Southern	BBVA Compass Stadium; Houston, TX	YouTube	W 35–7	9,027
November 6	6:30 pm	at Mississippi Valley State	Rice–Totten Field; Itta Bena, MS	ESPN3	W 38–23	2,024
November 15	2:00 pm	Alabama State	Eddie Robinson Stadium; Grambling, LA	PSB	L 23–37	7,000
November 29	1:30 pm	vs. Southern	Mercedes-Benz Superdome; New Orleans, LA (Bayou Classic)	NBC	L 45–52	57,852
*Non-conference game; ^{†}Homecoming; Rankings from The Sports Network Poll released prior to the game; All times are in Central time
