= Kokomo, Mississippi =

- Census-designated place
- Location within Mississippi Location within the United States
- Coordinates: 31°11′51″N 90°00′10″W
- Country: United States
- State: Mississippi
- County: Marion

Area
  - Total: 1.68 sq mi (4.35 km^{2})
  - Land: 1.68 sq mi (4.34 km^{2})
  - Water: 0.0039 sq mi (0.01 km^{2})
- Elevation: 358 ft (109 m)

Population (2020)
  - Total: 150
  - Density: 89.5/sq mi (34.56/km^{2})
- Time zone: UTC-6 (Central (CST))
  - Summer (DST): UTC-5 (CDT)
- ZIP code: 39643
- GNIS feature ID: 672210
- FIPS Code: 28-38160

Kokomo is a census-designated place and unincorporated community in Marion County, Mississippi, United States. Per the 2020 census, the population was 150.

== History ==
The community was named after the city of Kokomo, Indiana.

Kokomo was organized by the family of Phillip Enoch of Fernwood, Mississippi, around 1912. The Enochs planned to build a railroad east from Tylertown and established railroad stops along the planned route. Kokomo was the last planned station, but the railroad was never constructed. Kokomo was once home to a turpentine distillery, blacksmith shops, café, barbershop, grocery stores, gristmills, and a pharmacy.

A school first began operating in Kokomo in 1904. The Kokomo High School was closed in 1959.

== Geography ==
Kokomo is in western Marion County, with U.S. Route 98 forming its southern border. US 98 leads northeast 11 miles (18 km) to Columbia, the Marion county seat, and southwest 10 miles (16 km) to Tylertown.

According to the U.S. Census Bureau, the Kokomo CDP has an area of 1.68 square miles (4.35 km^{2}), of which 0.006 square miles (0.016 km^{2}), or 0.36%, are water. The community is drained to the south by tributaries of Tenmile Creek, which flows east to the Pearl River.

== Demographics ==
Historical population
Census	Pop.	Note	%±
2020	150		—
U.S. Decennial Census; 2020

Kokomo was first listed as a census designated place in the 2020 U.S. census.

=== 2020 census ===
Kokomo CDP, Mississippi – Racial and ethnic composition Note: the US Census treats Hispanic/Latino as an ethnic category. This table excludes Latinos from the racial categories and assigns them to a separate category. Hispanics/Latinos may be of any race.
Race / Ethnicity (NH = Non-Hispanic)	Pop 2020	% 2020
White alone (NH)	110	73.33%
Black or African American alone (NH)	35	23.33%
Native American or Alaska Native alone (NH)	0	0.00%
Asian alone (NH)	0	0.00%
Native Hawaiian or Pacific Islander alone (NH)	0	0.00%
Other race alone (NH)	0	0.00%
Mixed race or Multiracial (NH)	3	2.00%
Hispanic or Latino (any race)	2	1.33%
Total	150	100.00%

== Education ==
It is in the Marion County School District.

Marion County is in the service area of Pearl River Community College.

== Notable people ==
- Charles Coleman, former National Football League tight end
