= Stump Mitchell =

American football player and coach (born 1959)

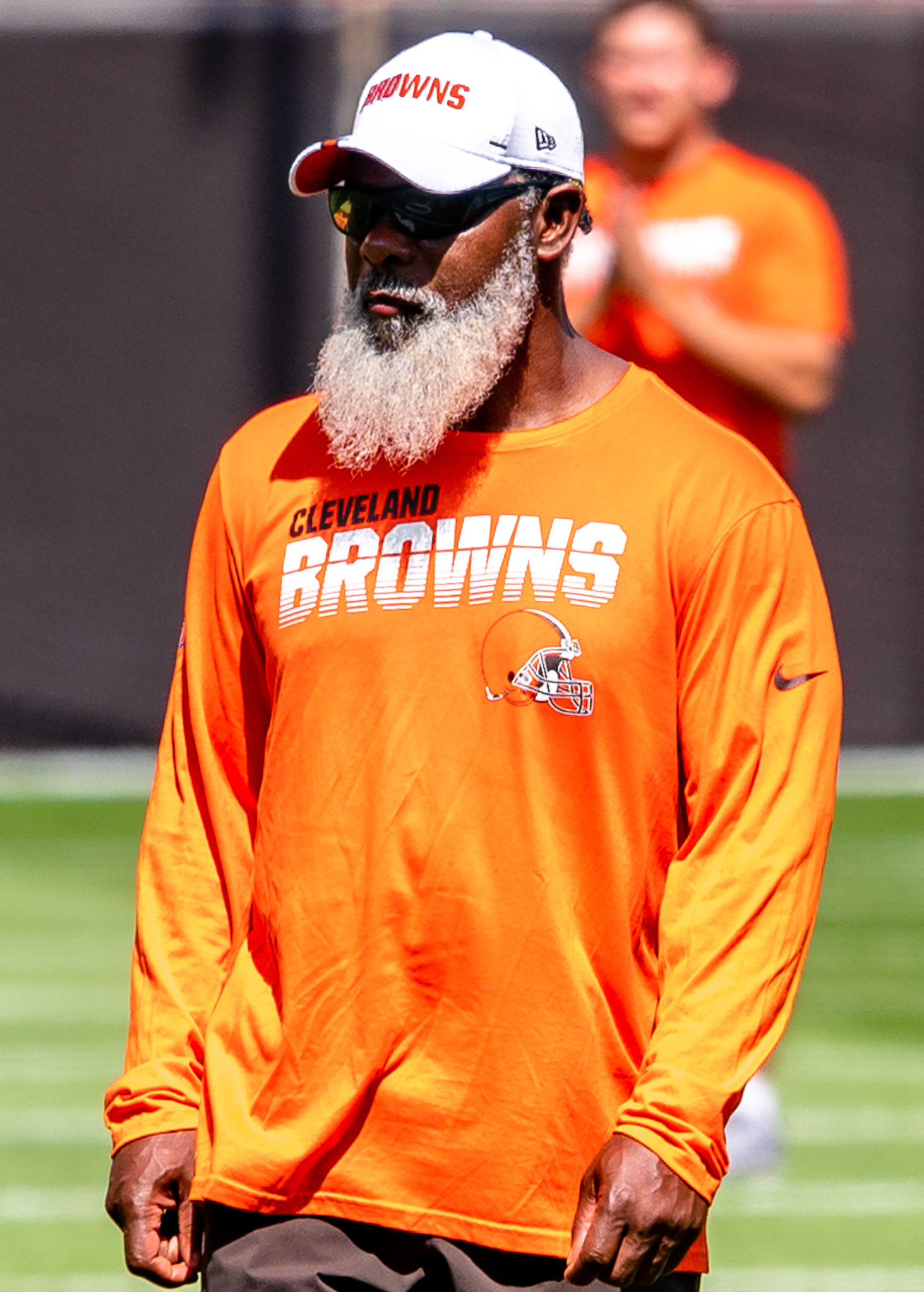
- Mitchell in 2019

West Georgia Wolves
- Title: Running backs coach

Personal information
- Born: March 15, 1959 (age 67); Saint Marys, Georgia, U.S.
- Listed height: 5 ft 9 in (1.75 m)
- Listed weight: 188 lb (85 kg)

Career information
- High school: Camden County (Kingsland, Georgia)
- College: The Citadel
- NFL draft: 1981: 9th round, 226th overall pick

Career history

Playing
- St. Louis / Phoenix Cardinals (1981–1989); Kansas City Chiefs (1991); Arizona Rattlers (1993)

Coaching
- San Antonio Riders (1992) Assistant; Casa Grande Union HS (AZ) (1993–1994) Head coach; Morgan State (1995) Assistant head coach & offensive coordinator; Morgan State (1996–1998) Head coach; Seattle Seahawks (1999–2007) Running backs coach; Washington Redskins (2008–2009) Assistant head coach & running backs coach; Southern (2010–2012) Head coach; Arizona Cardinals (2013–2016) Running backs coach; New York Jets (2017–2018) Running backs coach; Cleveland Browns (2019–2023) Running backs coach; West Georgia (2025–present) Running backs coach

Awards and highlights
- NFL kickoff return yards leader (1981); Third-team All-American (1980); Southern Conference Player of the Year (1980); South Carolina Amateur Athlete of the Year (1980); Member, The Citadel Athletic Hall of Fame; The Citadel Bulldogs Jersey No. 35 retired

Head coaching record
- Career: 14–42 (college)
- Stats at Pro Football Reference

Lyvonia Albert "Stump" Mitchell (born March 15, 1959) is an American football coach and former player who currently serves as the running backs coach for the West Georgia Wolves. He previously served in the same role for the Cleveland Browns of the National Football League (NFL). He served as head football coach at Morgan State University from 1996 to 1998 and Southern University from 2010 to 2012, compiling an overall college football record of 14–42. Mitchell played collegiately at The Citadel and thereafter was drafted by the St. Louis Cardinals. He was a running back and return specialist for the Cardinals from 1981 to 1989.

== Early life ==
Mitchell's football career began at Camden County High School, Camden County, Georgia. He played college football for The Citadel and holds school records for rushing yards in a season (1,647) and career (4,062). A three-year starter at tailback, he was a two-time all Southern Conference selection. As a senior in 1980 he was the second leading rusher in NCAA Division I-A behind Heisman Trophy winner George Rogers and was named a Third-Team Associated Press All-American; he was named Southern Conference Player of the Year and the South Carolina Amateur Athlete of the Year.

Mitchell also participated in track and field competition at The Citadel, recording a 23-foot 3 inch jump in 1981.

== Playing career ==
Mitchell was selected by the St. Louis Cardinals in the ninth round (226th pick overall) of the 1981 NFL draft. As a 5'9", 188 lbs. running back, Mitchell played for the Cardinals from 1981 to 1989 and ended his NFL career with the Kansas City Chiefs in 1990; he made a brief comeback with the Arizona Rattlers of the Arena Football League in 1993. His best year as a pro was during the 1985 season when he rushed for 1,006 yards and seven touchdowns, while also contributing 502 yards and 3 touchdowns as a receiver. In 10 NFL seasons he rushed 986 times for 4,647 yards and scored 32 touchdowns, he has the second most all purpose yards in Cardinals franchise history with 11,985 behind only Larry Fitzgerald.

== NFL career statistics ==
Legend
| | Led the league |
| **Bold** | Career high |

=== Regular season ===
| Year | Team | Games | | Rushing | | | | | Receiving | | | | |
| Year | Team | GP | GS | Att | Yds | Avg | Lng | TD | Rec | Yds | Avg | Lng | TD |
|---|---|---|---|---|---|---|---|---|---|---|---|---|---|
| 1981 | STL | **16** | 0 | 31 | 175 | **5.6** | 43 | 0 | 6 | 35 | 5.8 | 16 | 1 |
| 1982 | STL | 9 | 1 | 39 | 189 | 4.8 | 32 | 1 | 11 | 149 | **13.5** | 30 | 0 |
| 1983 | STL | 15 | 1 | 68 | 373 | 5.5 | 46 | 3 | 7 | 54 | 7.7 | 17 | 0 |
| 1984 | STL | **16** | 1 | 81 | 434 | 5.4 | 39 | **9** | 26 | 318 | 12.2 | 44 | 2 |
| 1985 | STL | **16** | 8 | 183 | **1,006** | 5.5 | **64** | 7 | **47** | **502** | 10.7 | **46** | **3** |
| 1986 | STL | 15 | 13 | 174 | 800 | 4.6 | 44 | 5 | 41 | 276 | 6.7 | 24 | 0 |
| 1987 | STL | 12 | 12 | **203** | 781 | 3.8 | 42 | 3 | 45 | 397 | 8.8 | 39 | 2 |
| 1988 | PHO | 14 | **14** | 164 | 726 | 4.4 | 47 | 4 | 25 | 214 | 8.6 | 28 | 1 |
| 1989 | PHO | 3 | 3 | 43 | 165 | 3.8 | 14 | 0 | 1 | 10 | 10.0 | 10 | 0 |
| | | 116 | 53 | 986 | 4,649 | 4.7 | 64 | 32 | 209 | 1,955 | 9.4 | 46 | 9 |

=== Playoffs ===
| Year | Team | Games | | Rushing | | | | | Receiving | | | | |
| Year | Team | GP | GS | Att | Yds | Avg | Lng | TD | Rec | Yds | Avg | Lng | TD |
|---|---|---|---|---|---|---|---|---|---|---|---|---|---|
| 1982 | STL | 1 | 0 | 7 | 21 | 3.0 | 13 | 0 | 4 | 57 | 14.3 | 36 | 0 |
| | | 1 | 0 | 7 | 21 | 3.0 | 13 | 0 | 4 | 57 | 14.3 | 36 | 0 |

== Coaching career ==
Mitchell served as head coach at Casa Grande Union High School in Casa Grande, Arizona from 1993 to 1994. He was the head coach at Morgan State University from 1996 to 1998, compiling a record of 8–24. He served as the running backs coach for the Seattle Seahawks from 1999 to 2007 then was brought by new head coach Jim Zorn to the Washington Redskins staff in 2008 serving as Running Backs Coach and Assistant Head Coach. Mitchell accepted the head coaching position at Southern University on January 11, 2010. During his first season, Mitchell led Southern to a 2–9 record. In 2011, the Jaguars finished with a 4–7 record.

To start off the 2012 season, Southern suffered a 66–21 loss to the New Mexico Lobos. After that defeat, the Jaguars returned home for a Thursday home game against Mississippi Valley State which aired nationally on ESPNU. Southern was upset 6–0 by Valley in that contest. The next day Mitchell was reassigned to another position within the university, ending his tenure as Southern's head coach after only 24 games. He finished with a 6–18 overall record. Defensive coordinator Dawson Odums was named as the interim coach of the Jaguars.

Mitchell joined the Arizona Cardinals as the running backs coach in 2013, and was with the team for four seasons before leaving the team in January 2017. He was signed to be the New York Jets' running backs coach in February 2017. In 2019, Mitchell joined the Cleveland Browns as the running backs coach. The following season, even with the Browns’ head coaching change, Stump was retained as the running backs coach. On January 17, 2024, days after a loss to the Houston Texans in the Wild Card round, Browns' head coach Kevin Stefanski fired Mitchell. Beginning in Spring 2026, Michell took a position of senior advisor at The Citadel.

== Personal life ==
Mitchell is a member of Omega Psi Phi fraternity. His older brother called him "Stump", because he was never intimidated by playing with kids bigger than he was. Mitchell is married to his wife Rita Mitchell and a father of four including, actress Gail Bean.

== Head coaching record ==
=== College ===
| Year | Team | Overall | Conference | Standing | Bowl/playoffs |
|---|---|---|---|---|---|
**Morgan State Bears** (Mid-Eastern Athletic Conference) (1996–1998)
| 1996 | Morgan State | 4–7 | 2–5 | T–6th | |
| 1997 | Morgan State | 3–7 | 2–5 | 6th | |
| 1998 | Morgan State | 1–10 | 1–7 | 8th | |
| Morgan State: | | 8–24 | 5–17 | | |
**Southern Jaguars** (South Western Athletic Conference]) (2010–2012)
| 2010 | Southern | 2–9 | 1–8 | 5th (West) | |
| 2011 | Southern | 4–7 | 4–5 | 4th (West) | |
| 2012 | Southern | 0–2 (Note: Mitchell was Southern's head coach for the first two games of the 2012 season before he was fired. Dawson Odums served as interim head coach for the final nine games. Southern finished the year 4–7 overall and 3–6 in conference play, tying for second place in the Southwestern Athletic Conference's West Division.) | 0–1 | (West) | |
| Southern: | | 6–18 | 5–14 | | |
| Total: | | 14–42 | | | |
