= 2012 Grambling State Tigers football team =

American college football season

2012 Grambling State Tigers football
- Conference: Southwestern Athletic Conference
- West Division
- Record: 1–10 (0–9 SWAC)
- Head coach: Doug Williams (8th season)
- Offensive coordinator: Vyron Brown (2nd season)
- Home stadium: Eddie Robinson Stadium

2012 Southwestern Athletic Conference football standings
	Conf.			Overall
Team	W		L	W		L
East Division
Jackson State xy	7	–	2	7	–	5
Alabama State	7	–	2	7	–	4
Alabama A&M	6	–	3	7	–	4
Mississippi Valley State	5	–	4	5	–	6
Alcorn State	4	–	5	4	–	7
West Division
Arkansas–Pine Bluff xy$	8	–	1	10	–	2
Prairie View A&M	3	–	6	3	–	8
Southern	3	–	6	4	–	7
Texas Southern *	2	–	7	2	–	9
Grambling State	0	–	9	1	–	10
Championship: Arkansas–Pine Bluff 24, Jackson State 21 ^{OT}
$ – Conference champion; x – Division champion/co-champions; y – Championship game participant; * – ineligible for postseason

The 2012 Grambling State Tigers football team represented Grambling State University in the 2012 NCAA Division I FCS football season. The Tigers were led by head coach Doug Williams in the second season of his second tenure as head coach and eighth overall after coaching the Tigers from 1998 to 2003. They played their home games at Eddie Robinson Stadium. They were a member of the West Division of the Southwestern Athletic Conference (SWAC) and finished the season with an overall record of one win and ten losses (1–10, 0–9 SWAC).

== Schedule ==
Date	Time	Opponent	Site	TV	Result	Attendance
September 1	6:00 pm	vs. Alcorn State	Independence Stadium; Shreveport, LA (Port City Classic)	SWAC TV	L 21–22	NA
September 8	6:00 pm	at No. 17 (FBS) TCU*	Amon G. Carter Stadium; Ft. Worth, TX	FSSW	L 0–56	45,112
September 15	4:00 pm	Alabama State	Eddie Robinson Stadium; Grambling, LA	SWAC TV	L 18–19	8,062
September 29	6:00 pm	at Alabama A&M	Louis Crews Stadium; Huntsville, AL	ESPNU	L 17–38	6,823
October 6	6:00 pm	vs. Prairie View A&M	Cotton Bowl; Dallas, TX (State Fair Classic)	ESPNU	L 14–31	33,123
October 13	2:00 pm	at Mississippi Valley State	Rice–Totten Field; Itta Bena, MS		L 21–45	4,076
October 20	2:00 pm	Virginia–Lynchburg*^{†}	Eddie Robinson Stadium; Grambling, LA		W 22–7	12,569
October 27	4:00 pm	at Texas Southern	BBVA Compass Stadium; Houston, TX	SWAC TV	L 20–23	2,966
November 3	2:00 pm	Jackson State	Eddie Robinson Stadium; Grambling, LA		L 17–53	7,000
November 10	2:00 pm	Arkansas–Pine Bluff	Eddie Robinson Stadium; Grambling, LA		L 17–24	7,324
November 24	1:30 pm	vs. Southern	Mercedes-Benz Superdome; New Orleans, LA (Bayou Classic)	NBC	L 33–38	45,980
*Non-conference game; ^{†}Homecoming; Rankings from The Sports Network Poll released prior to the game; All times are in Central time
