= Charles Coleman (American football) =

American football player (born 1963)

No. 83
- Position: Tight end

Personal information
- Born: September 16, 1963 (age 63); Kokomo, Mississippi, U.S.
- Listed height: 6 ft 4 in (1.93 m)
- Listed weight: 222 lb (101 kg)

Career information
- High school: West Marion (Foxworth, Mississippi)
- College: Alcorn State (1982–1985)
- NFL draft: 1986: undrafted

Career history
- New York Giants (1987)
- Stats at Pro Football Reference

Charles Edward Coleman (born September 16, 1963) is an American former professional football tight end who played one season with the New York Giants of the National Football League (NFL). He played college football at Alcorn State University.

== Early life and college ==
Charles Edward Coleman was born on September 16, 1963, in Kokomo, Mississippi. He attended West Marion High School in Foxworth, Mississippi.

He was a four-year letterman for the Alcorn State Braves of Alcorn State University from 1982 to 1985.

== Professional career ==
After going undrafted in the 1986 NFL draft, Coleman signed with the New York Giants over a year later on May 11, 1987. He was released on August 10. He re-signed with the Giants on September 25, during the 1987 NFL players strike. Coleman played in three games for the Giants during the 1987 season and caught one pass for five yards while also returning one kick for 20 yards. He was released on October 19, 1987.
