= Dwight Fisher =

American football/basketball coach and college athletics administrator

Biographical details
- Born: September 24, 1912; Tallahassee, Florida, U.S.
- Died: October 18, 1991 (aged 79); Dallas, Texas, U.S.

Playing career
- ?: Fisk

Coaching career (HC unless noted)

Football
- 1937–1940: Alabama A&M
- 1947: Wilberforce
- 1948–1956: Alcorn A&M
- 1957–1973: Bishop

Basketball
- 1937–1939: Alabama A&M
- 1948–1956: Alcorn A&M

Administrative career (AD unless noted)
- 1948–1957: Alcorn A&M
- 1957–1973: Bishop

Dwight Hillis "Red" Fisher (September 24, 1912 – October 18, 1991) was an American football and basketball coach and college athletics administrator. He served as the head football coach at Alabama A&M University in Normal, Alabama from 1937 to 1940, Wilberforce University in Wilberforce, Ohio in 1947, Alcorn Agricultural and Mechanical College—now known as Alcorn State University—Claiborne County, Mississippi from 1948 to 1956, and Bishop College in Marshall, Texas and Dallas from 1957 to 1973. Fisher was also the head basketball coach at Alabama A&M from 1937 to 1939 and Alcorn A&M from 1948 to 1956.

Alcorn State later named the field at its football and soccer stadium (Dwight Fisher Field at Casem–Spinks Stadium) in his honor.

Fisher was born on September 24, 1912, in Tallahassee, Florida, the younger of two children born to Rev. Lucien Clarence Fisher Jr. (1872–1947) and Cordelia Anne Quinn (1870–1949).
