= Dawson Odums =

American football coach

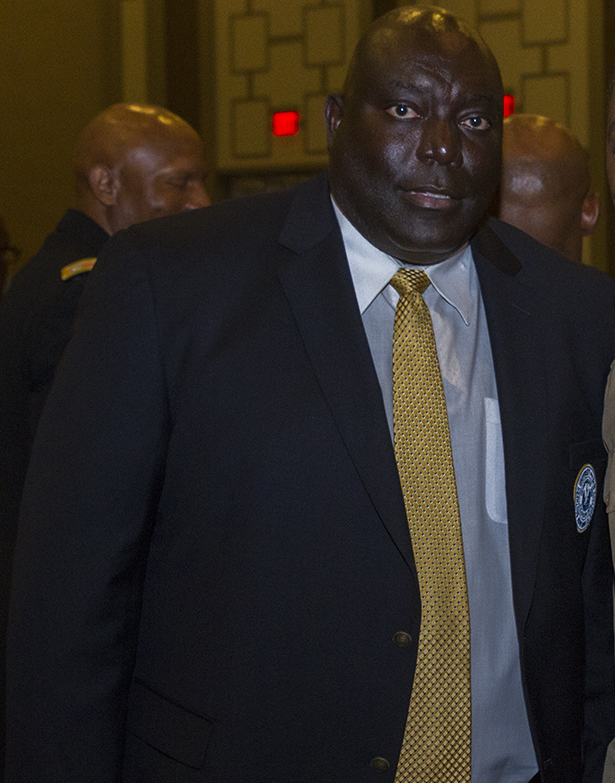
- Odums in 2016

Current position
- Title: Head coach
- Team: Bowie State
- Conference: CIAA
- Record: 0–0

Biographical details
- Born: Shelby, North Carolina, U.S.

Playing career
- 1994–1997: North Carolina Central

Coaching career (HC unless noted)
- 1999: Gardner–Webb (DL)
- 2000: Georgia Southern (OLB)
- 2001: Georgia Southern (DE)
- 2002–2003: Clark Atlanta (AHC/DC)
- 2004: Clark Atlanta (interim HC)
- 2005–2007: Bethune–Cookman (DL)
- 2008–2009: North Carolina A&T (ST/DL)
- 2010: North Carolina A&T (DC)
- 2011–2012: Southern (DL)
- 2012: Southern (interim HC)
- 2013–2020: Southern
- 2021–2024: Norfolk State
- 2026–present: Bowie State

Head coaching record
- Overall: 79–72

Accomplishments and honors

Championships
- 1 SWAC (2013); 4 SWAC West Division (2013–2014, 2018–2019)

Awards
- SWAC Coach of the Year (2013)

Dawson Tayrone Odums is an American football coach. He is the head coach at Bowie State University, a position he has held since 2026. He also served as the head coach at Norfolk State University, a position he held from 2021 to 2024. Odums also served as the interim head football coach at Clark Atlanta University for one season, in 2004, and head football coach at Southern University and A&M College from 2013 to 2020.

== Coaching career ==
Odums agreed to a three-year contract extension as head football coach with Southern University as reported by the Advocate and confirmed by his agent Burton Rocks on January 17, 2014. On January 21, 2015, it was reported in the Advocate that Bethune-Cookman had asked for, and received, permission to speak with Coach Odums regarding their own head coaching vacancy. On April 20, 2021, Odums agreed to a six-year deal with Norfolk State to become the new head coach.

== Head coaching record ==
Year	Team	Overall	Conference	Standing	Bowl/playoffs
Clark Atlanta Panthers (Southern Intercollegiate Athletic Conference) (2004)
2004	Clark Atlanta	1–9	1–7	8th	
Clark Atlanta:		1–9	1–7		
Southern Jaguars (Southwestern Athletic Conference) (2012–2020)
2012	Southern	4–5 (Note: Stump Mitchell was Southern's head coach for the first two games of the 2012 season before he was fired. Odums served as interim head coach for the final nine games. Southern finished the year 4–7 overall and 3–6 in conference play.)	3–5	T–2nd (West)	
2013	Southern	9–4	7–2	1st (West)	
2014	Southern	9–4	8–1	1st (West)	
2015	Southern	6–5	6–3	3rd (West)	
2016	Southern	8–3	8–1	2nd (West)	
2017	Southern	7–3	5–1	2nd (West)	
2018	Southern	7–3	6–1	1st (West)	
2019	Southern	8–4	6–1	1st (West)	
2020–21	Southern	5–1	4–1	2nd (West)	
Southern:		63–32	53–16		
Norfolk State Spartans (Mid-Eastern Athletic Conference) (2021–2024)
2021	Norfolk State	6–5	2–3	4th	
2022	Norfolk State	2–9	2–3	T–3rd	
2023	Norfolk State	3–8	1–4	6th	
2024	Norfolk State	4–8	2–3	4th	
Norfolk State:		15–31	7–13		
Bowie State Bulldogs (Central Intercollegiate Athletic Association) (2026–present)
2026	Bowie State	0–0	0–0		
Bowie State:		0–0	0–0		
Total:		79–72			
National championship Conference title Conference division title or championship game berth
