= Heishma Northern =

American football coach

Biographical details
- Born: Baton Rouge, Louisiana, U.S.
- Education: Southern; Grambling State

Coaching career (HC unless noted)
- 1996–1997: Glen Oaks HS (LA) (DL)
- 1997–1998: Morehouse (ST/RB)
- 1998–2000: Grambling State (RB)
- 2001–2002: Grambling State (DB)
- 2003–2004: Grambling State (DC/DB)
- 2005–2010: Prairie View A&M (assoc. HC/DC)
- 2011–2014: Prairie View A&M
- 2015: Texas Southern (DC)

Head coaching record
- Overall: 19–25

Heishma Northern is an American former college football coach. He was the head football coach for Prairie View A&M University from 2011 to 2014. He also coached for Glen Oaks High School, Morehouse, Grambling State, and Texas Southern.

== Head coaching record ==
Year	Team	Overall	Conference	Standing	Bowl/playoffs
Prairie View A&M Panthers (Southwestern Athletic Conference) (2011–2014)
2011	Prairie View A&M	5–6	5–4	T–2nd (West)	
2012	Prairie View A&M	3–8	3–6	T–2nd (West)	
2013	Prairie View A&M	6–6	4–4	2nd (West)	
2014	Prairie View A&M	5–5	5–4	3rd (West)	
Prairie View A&M:		19–25	15–19		
Total:		19–25			
