= Soul Bowl =

American college football rivalry

- Alcorn State Braves Jackson State Tigers
- Sport: Football
- First meeting: 1927; Alcorn A&M, 25–12
- Latest meeting: November 21, 2026; Jackson State, 27–21
- Next meeting: November 20, 2027; Jackson, MS
- Stadiums: Casem-Spinks Stadium; Mississippi Veterans Memorial Stadium; Alumni Field (Jackson, MS); King Field (Vicksburg, MS); City Park (Vicksburg); Henderson Stadium (Lorman, MS)

Statistics
- Total meetings: 91
- All-time series: Jackson State leads, 51–38–2
- Largest victory: Alcorn A&M, 52–0 (1932); Jackson State, 58–6 (1999)
- Longest win streak: Jackson College, 9 (1955–1963)
- Current win streak: Jackson State, 3 (2024–present)

Locations of Alcorn State at Jackson State

The Soul Bowl is an American college football rivalry between Jackson State and Alcorn State. Mississippi's two largest historically black colleges and universities have played 91 times in a game dating back to the late 1920s. The game has carried the unofficial moniker "the Soul Bowl" since the late 1970s. JSU currently holds a 51–38–2 lead in the series which has included some of the greatest names in college football. From 1993 to 2011, the game was dubbed the "Capital City Classic" and held in Jackson annually before it was moved to an alternating schedule between Jackson and Lorman in 2012. During the 2020 season, Alcorn State, after choosing to forgo its season, the SWAC ruled that all their scheduled games would result in forfeits.

== Results ==
Jackson State victories	Alcorn State victories	Tie games	Vacated wins

No.	Date	Location	Winner	Score
1	1927		Alcorn A&M	25–12
2	1928		Alcorn A&M	12–0
3	1929		Alcorn A&M	17–12
4	1931	Jackson, MS	Jackson College	19–6
5	1932		Alcorn A&M	19–7
6	1932		Alcorn A&M	52–0
7	1933		Alcorn A&M	6–0
8	1934		Alcorn A&M	7–6
9	October 29, 1938	Jackson, MS	Alcorn A&M	29–0
10	1939		Tie	0–0
11	October 25, 1946	Jackson, MS (Alumni Field)	Jackson College	6–0
12	October 25, 1947	Vicksburg, MS (King Field)	Alcorn A&M	13–0
13	October 23, 1948	Jackson, MS (Alumni Field)	Jackson College	12–0
14	1949	Vicksburg, MS (City Park)	Alcorn A&M	6–0
15	October 21, 1950	Jackson, MS (Alumni Field)	Alcorn A&M	19–14
16	October 20, 1951	Jackson, MS (Alumni Field)	Alcorn A&M	18–6
17	October 25, 1952	Jackson, MS (Alumni Field)	Alcorn A&M	13–0
18	November 26, 1953	Jackson, MS (Alumni Field)	Jackson College	19–0
19	November 25, 1954	Jackson, MS (Alumni Field)	Alcorn A&M	19–13
20	October 17, 1955	Jackson, MS (Alumni Field)	Jackson College	14–0
21	October 15, 1956	Lorman, MS (Henderson Stadium)	Jackson College	37–20
22	October 21, 1957	Jackson, MS (Alumni Field)	Jackson College	40–0
23	October 18, 1958	Lorman, MS (Henderson Stadium)	Jackson College	69–6
24	October 17, 1959	Jackson, MS (Alumni Field)	Jackson College	21–12
25	October 15, 1960	Lorman, MS (Henderson Stadium)	Jackson College	26–0
26	October 14, 1961	Jackson, MS (Alumni Field)	Jackson College	28–20
27	October 13, 1962	Lorman, MS (Henderson Stadium)	Jackson College	34–0
28	October 12, 1963	Jackson, MS (Alumni Field)	Jackson College	22–13
29	October 10, 1964	Lorman, MS (Henderson Stadium)	Alcorn State	27–8
30	September 25, 1965	Jackson, MS (Alumni Field)	Jackson College	21–6
31	September 24, 1966	Lorman, MS (Henderson Stadium)	Tie	25–25
32	September 23, 1967	Jackson, MS (Alumni Field)	Jackson State	7–6
33	September 28, 1968	Lorman, MS (Henderson Stadium)	Alcorn A&M	30–6
34	September 27, 1969	Jackson, MS	Alcorn A&M	50–8
35	November 26, 1970	Jackson, MS	Alcorn A&M	30–11
36	November 25, 1971	Jackson, MS	Jackson State	35–29
37	November 23, 1972	Jackson, MS	Jackson State	28–14
38	November 22, 1973	Jackson, MS	Jackson State	21–7
39	November 28, 1974	Lorman, MS (Henderson Stadium)	Jackson State	19–13
40	November 27, 1975	Jackson, MS	Alcorn State	12–6
41	November 20, 1976	Lorman, MS (Henderson Stadium)	Alcorn State	19–7
42	November 24, 1977	Jackson, MS	Jackson State	23–16
43	November 23, 1978	Lorman, MS (Henderson Stadium)	Jackson State	36–8
44	November 22, 1979	Jackson, MS	Alcorn State	9–7
45	November 22, 1980	Lorman, MS (Henderson Stadium)	Jackson State	37–16
46	November 26, 1981	Jackson, MS	Jackson State	13–10

No.	Date	Location	Winner	Score
47	November 20, 1982	Lorman, MS (Henderson Stadium)	Jackson State	20–16
48	November 19, 1983	Jackson, MS	Alcorn State	24–17
49	November 17, 1984	Lorman, MS (Henderson Stadium)	Alcorn State	17–13
50	November 24, 1985	Jackson, MS	Jackson State	31–20
51	November 22, 1986	Jackson, MS	Jackson State	23–17
52	November 21, 1987	Jackson, MS	Jackson State	19–10
53	November 19, 1988	Jackson, MS	Jackson State	7–0
54	November 18, 1989	Jackson, MS	Jackson State	23–20
55	November 17, 1990	Jackson, MS	Jackson State	38–20
56	November 23, 1991	Jackson, MS	Alcorn State	18–16
57	November 21, 1992	Lorman, MS	Alcorn State	42–35
58	November 20, 1993	Jackson, MS	Alcorn State	31–22
59	November 19, 1994	Jackson, MS	Alcorn State	52–34
60	November 18, 1995	Jackson, MS	Jackson State	28–7
61	November 23, 1996	Jackson, MS	Jackson State	27–17
62	November 22, 1997	Jackson, MS	Jackson State	54–15
63	November 21, 1998	Jackson, MS	Jackson State	56–26
64	November 20, 1999	Jackson, MS	Jackson State	58–6
65	November 18, 2000	Jackson, MS	Jackson State	30–14
66	November 17, 2001	Jackson, MS	Jackson State	52–28
67	November 23, 2002	Jackson, MS	Jackson State	34–20
68	November 22, 2003	Jackson, MS	Alcorn State	49–25
69	November 20, 2004	Jackson, MS	Alcorn State	16–14
70	November 19, 2005	Jackson, MS	Alcorn State	31–14
71	November 18, 2006	Jackson, MS	Alcorn State	32–31
72	November 17, 2007	Jackson, MS	Jackson State	31–19
73	November 22, 2008	Jackson, MS	Jackson State	26–21
74	November 21, 2009	Jackson, MS	Alcorn State	14–7
75	November 20, 2010	Jackson, MS	Jackson State	27–14
76	November 19, 2011	Jackson, MS	Jackson State	51–7
77	November 17, 2012	Lorman, MS	Jackson State	37–11
78	November 16, 2013	Jackson, MS	Alcorn State	48–33
79	November 22, 2014	Lorman, MS	Jackson State	34–31
80	November 28, 2015	Jackson, MS	Alcorn State	14–10
81	November 19, 2016	Lorman, MS	Alcorn State	35–16
82	November 18, 2017	Jackson, MS	Jackson State	7–3
83	November 17, 2018	Lorman, MS	Alcorn State	24–3
84	November 23, 2019	Jackson, MS	Alcorn State	41–6
85	April 17, 2020	Lorman, MS	Jackson State	2–0 (forfeit)
86	November 20, 2021	Jackson, MS	Jackson State	24–10
87	November 19, 2022	Lorman, MS	Jackson State	24–13
88	November 18, 2023	Jackson, MS	Alcorn State	28–24
89	November 23, 2024	Lorman, MS	Jackson State	48–10
90	November 22, 2025	Jackson, MS	Jackson State	27–21
91	November 21, 2026	Lorman, MS	Jackson State	54–40
Series: Jackson State leads 51–38–2

(All games listed in Jackson, MS were played at Mississippi Veterans Memorial Stadium and all games listed in Lorman, MS were played at Casem-Spinks Stadium unless otherwise noted)
