= Darrell Asberry =

American football player and coach (born 1972)

Biographical details
- Born: February 12, 1972 (age 54); Baton Rouge, Louisiana, U.S.

Playing career
- 1991–1994: Jackson State
- Position: Quarterback

Coaching career (HC unless noted)
- 2001–2002: Jackson State (OC)
- 2003: Coahoma (OC)
- 2004: North Carolina Central (OC/QB)
- 2005: North Carolina Central (AHC/OC/QB)
- 2006–2011: Shaw
- 2012–2015: Texas Southern

Head coaching record
- Overall: 51–57
- Tournaments: 0–2 (NCAA D-II playoffs)

Accomplishments and honors

Championships
- 3 CIAA (2007, 2008, 2010)

Darrell Asberry (born February 12, 1972) is an American former college football coach. He served as head football coach at Shaw University from 2006 to 2011 and Texas Southern University from 2012 to 2015, compiling a career coaching record of 51–57.

== Head coaching record ==
Year	Team	Overall	Conference	Standing	Bowl/playoffs
Shaw Bears (Central Intercollegiate Athletic Association) (2006–2011)
2006	Shaw	3–7	2–5	T–4th (Eastern)	
2007	Shaw	8–4	6–1	1st (Western)	L NCAA Division II First Round
2008	Shaw	8–3	6–1	T–1st (Western)	
2009	Shaw	8–2	5–2	2nd (Western)	
2010	Shaw	9–3	7–0	1st (Southern)	L NCAA Division II First Round
2011	Shaw	3–7	3–4	T–4th (Southern)	
Shaw:		39–26	29–13		
Texas Southern Tigers (Southwestern Athletic Conference) (2012–2015)
2012	Texas Southern	2–9	2–7	4th (West)	
2013	Texas Southern	2–9	2–7	4th (West)	
2014	Texas Southern	5–6	3–6	T–4th (West)	
2015	Texas Southern	3–7	2–7	4th (West)	
Texas Southern:		12–31	9–27		
Total:		51–57			
National championship Conference title Conference division title or championship game berth
