= Arkansas–Pine Bluff Golden Lions football =

College American football program

2026 Arkansas–Pine Bluff Golden Lions football team
- First season: 1916; 110 years ago
- Head coach: Alonzo Hampton; 4th season, 9–26 (.257)
- Location: Pine Bluff, Arkansas
- Stadium: Simmons Bank Field (capacity: 16,000)
- NCAA division: Division I FCS
- Conference: SWAC
- Division: West
- Colors: Black and gold
- All-time record: 351–460–44 (.436)

Black college national championships
- 2012

Conference championships
- SWAC: 2012

Division championships
- SWAC West: 2006, 2012, 2020
- Marching band: The Marching Musical Machine of the Mid-South (M4)
- Website: uapblionsroar.com

The Arkansas–Pine Bluff Golden Lions football program represents the University of Arkansas at Pine Bluff in college football as the NCAA Division I Football Championship Subdivision (FCS) level as a member of the Southwestern Athletic Conference (SWAC). The Lions play their home games at Simmons Bank Field in Pine Bluff, Arkansas.

Simmons Bank Field, their home stadium since 2000

== Conference memberships ==
- Independent (1923–1935, 1970–1972)
- Southwestern Athletic Conference (1936–1969, 1998–present)
- NCAA Division II independent (1973–1982)
- NAIA independent (1983–1984, 1987–1997)
- Arkansas Intercollegiate Conference (1985–1986)

== Major Classic ==
- Southern Heritage Classic

== Championships ==
=== National ===
Year	Championship	Coach	Overall record	Conference record
2012	Black college national	Monte Coleman	10–2	8–1

=== Conference championships ===
Year	Conference	Coach	Overall record	Conference record
2012	Southwestern Athletic Conference	Monte Coleman	10–2	8–1

=== Division championships ===
Year	Division	Coach	Record	Opponent	Result	Attendance
2006	SWAC West	Mo Forte	8–4 (7–3)	Alabama A&M Bulldogs	L 13–22 Alabama A&M	30,213
2012	SWAC West	Monte Coleman	10–2 (8–1)	Jackson State Tigers	W 24–21 ^{OT} Jackson State	32,480
2020	SWAC West	Doc Gamble	4–1 (4–0)	Alabama A&M Bulldogs	L 33–40 Alabama A&M	17,248

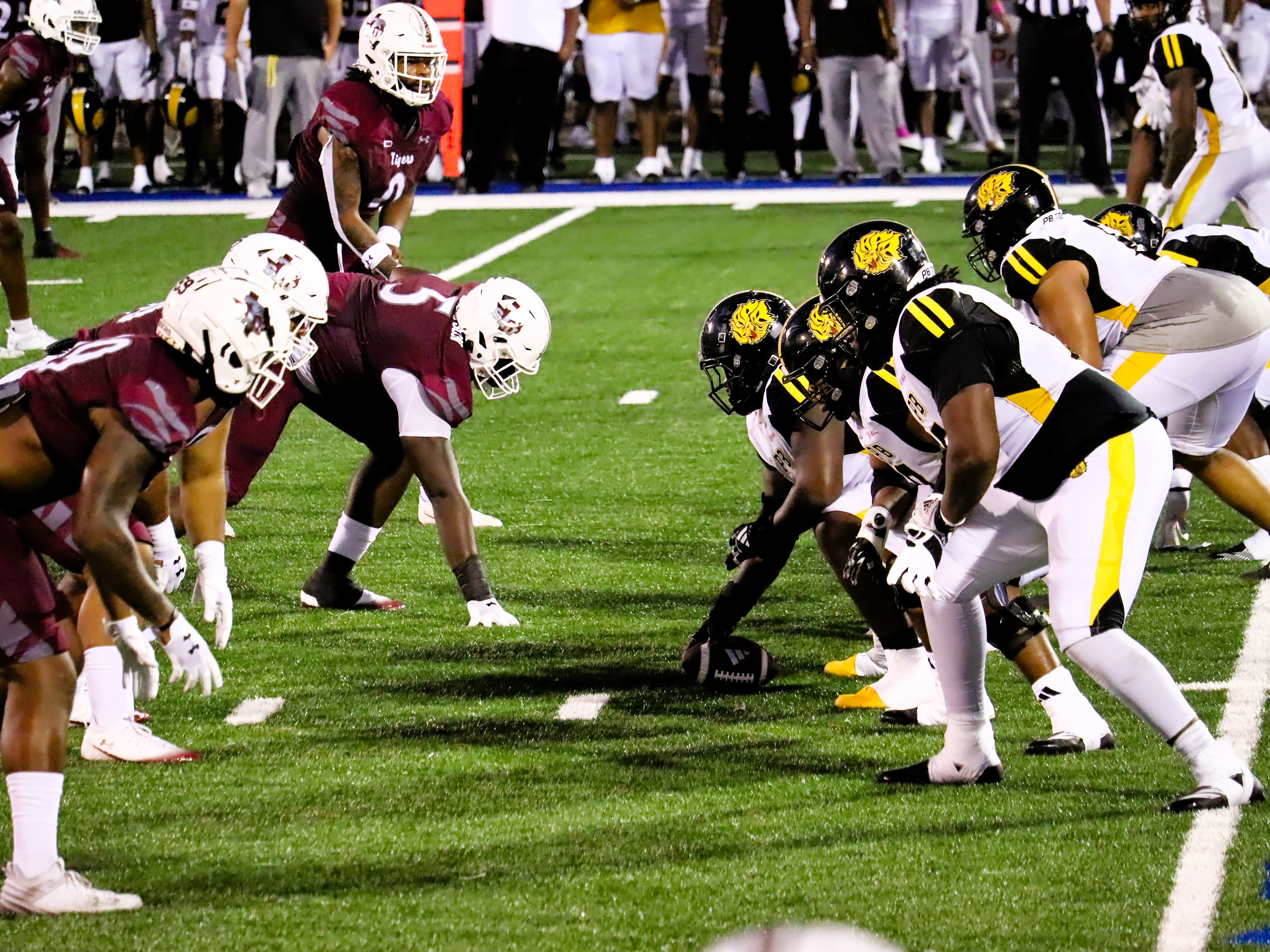
UAPB players (right) line up on offense against Texas Southern in 2025

== Playoff appearances ==
=== NAIA ===
The Golden Lions appeared in the NAIA playoffs two times. Their combined record was 3–2.

Year	Round	Opponent	Result
1994	Quarterfinals; Semifinals; National Championship	Central State (OH); Montana Western; Northeastern State (OK)	W, 21–14; W, 60–53 ^{OT} L, 12–13
1995	Semifinals	Northeastern State (OK)	L, 14–17

== Notable players ==
=== Alumni in the NFL ===
Over 29 Arkansas Pine Bluff alumni have played in the NFL, including:

- L. C. Greenwood
- Terron Armstead
- Greg Wesley
- Dante Wesley
- Jamie Gillan
- Courtney Van Buren
- Mark Bradley
- Caesar Belser
- Chris Akins
- Charles Ali
- Brian Jones (tight end)
- Greg Briggs
- Robert Brown
- Wallace Francis
- Willie Frazier
- Ernest Grant
- Gene Jeter
- Mike Lewis
- Cleo Miller
- Ray Nealy
- Terry Nelson
- Willie Parker (defensive tackle)
- Rickey Parks
- Manny Sistrunk
- Clarence Washington
- Monk Williams
- Don Zimmerman (wide receiver)
- Raymond Webber
- Martell Mallett
- Ivory Lee Brown

== Future non-conference opponents ==
Announced schedules as of March 2, 2026

2026	2027
vs Morehouse; Little Rock, AR	at Texas Tech
at Missouri	
Central State	
