= KUAP =

Radio station in Pine Bluff, Arkansas

- Pine Bluff, Arkansas; United States
- Frequency: 89.7 MHz
- Branding: Hot 89.7

Programming
- Format: Urban contemporary

Ownership
- Owner: UA board of trustees

History
- First air date: 1983
- Call sign meaning: University of Arkansas Pine Bluff

Technical information
- Licensing authority: FCC
- Facility ID: 6113
- Class: C2
- ERP: 50,000 watts
- HAAT: 81.7 meters (268 ft)
- Transmitter coordinates: 34°14′33″N 92°1′2″W

Links
- Public license information: Public file; LMS
- Webcast: KUAP
- Website: Official website

KUAP (89.7 FM, Hot 89.7) is a station broadcasting an urban contemporary music format. Licensed to Pine Bluff, Arkansas, United States, the station is owned by the board of trustees of the UA/UAPB and is based on the campus of University of Arkansas Pine Bluff.
