= Alcorn State Braves football =

Collegiate American football team in Mississippi

2026 Alcorn State Braves football team
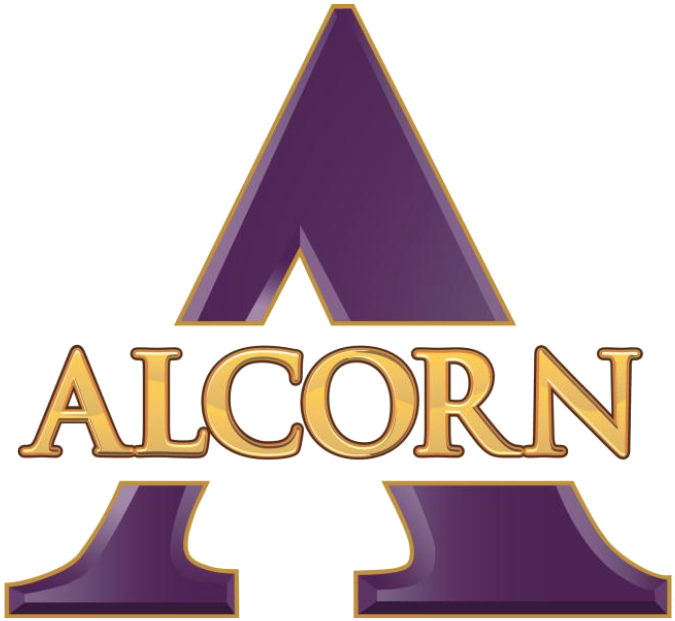
- First season: 1921; 105 years ago
- Head coach: Cedric Thomas; 3rd season, 11–12 (.478)
- Location: Lorman, Mississippi
- Stadium: Casem-Spinks Stadium (capacity: 22,500)
- Conference: Southwestern Athletic Conference
- Division: East
- Colors: Purple and gold
- All-time record: 502–396–38 (.557)

Black college national championships
- 1968, 1969, 1974, 1984, 2014

Conference championships
- SWAC: 1968, 1969, 1970, 1974, 1976, 1979, 1984, 1992, 1994, 2014, 2015, 2018, 2019

Division championships
- SWAC West: 2003, 2014, 2015, 2016, 2017, 2018, 2019, 2023
- Rivalries: Jackson State (rivalry)
- Website: alcornsports.com

The Alcorn State Braves are the college football team of Alcorn State University. The Braves play in NCAA Division I Football Championship Subdivision as a member of the Southwestern Athletic Conference (SWAC).

== History ==
=== Classifications ===
- 1964–1969: NAIA
- 1970–1983: NAIA Division I
- 1965–1972: NCAA College Division
- 1973–1976: NCAA Division II
- 1977: NCAA Division I
- 1978–present: NCAA Division I–AA/FCS

=== Conference memberships ===
- 1921–?: Independent
- c. 1928: Gulf Coast Athletic Association
- ?–1934: Independent
- 1935–1962: South Central Athletic Conference
- 1961–present: Southwestern Athletic Conference

== Championships ==
=== Black college national championships ===
Alcorn State has won five Black college football national championships.

Year	Championship	Coach	Overall record	Conference
1968	Black College National Champions	Marino Casem	9–1	SWAC
1969	Black College National Champions	Marino Casem	8–0–1	SWAC
1974	Black College National co-champions	Marino Casem	9–2	SWAC
1984	Black College National Champions	Marino Casem	9–1	SWAC
2014	Black College National Champions	Jay Hopson	10–3	SWAC

=== SWAC championships ===
Alcorn joined the Southwestern Athletic Conference SWAC in 1962. Since then, the Braves have won thirteen conference championships, nine outright and four shared.

Season	Conference	Coach	Overall record	Conference record
1968*	Southwestern Athletic Conference	Marino Casem	9–1	6–1
1969	Southwestern Athletic Conference	Marino Casem	8–0–1	6–0–1
1970	Southwestern Athletic Conference	Marino Casem	8–1	6–0
1974*	Southwestern Athletic Conference	Marino Casem	9–2	5–1
1976	Southwestern Athletic Conference	Marino Casem	8–2	5–1
1979*	Southwestern Athletic Conference	Marino Casem	8–2	5–1
1984	Southwestern Athletic Conference	Marino Casem	9–1	7–0
1992	Southwestern Athletic Conference	Cardell Jones	7–4	7–0
1994*	Southwestern Athletic Conference	Cardell Jones	8–3–1	6–1
2014	Southwestern Athletic Conference	Jay Hopson	10–3	7–2
2015	Southwestern Athletic Conference	Jay Hopson	9–4	7–2
2018	Southwestern Athletic Conference	Fred McNair	9–4	6–1
2019	Southwestern Athletic Conference	Fred McNair	9–4	6–1

== Playoff appearances ==
=== NCAA Division I FCS ===
The Braves have appeared in the I-AA/FCS playoffs three times with an overall record of 0–3.

Year	Round	Opponent	Result	Source
1984	Quarterfinals	Louisiana Tech	L 21–44	
1992	First Round	Northeast Louisiana	L 27–78	
1994	First Round	Youngstown State	L 20–63	

=== NCAA Division II ===
The Braves appeared in the Division II playoffs one time, with an overall record of 0–1.

Year	Round	Opponent	Result	Source
1974	Quarterfinals	UNLV	L 22–35	

== Bowl games ==
Date	Coach	Bowl	Opponent	Result
December 1, 1951	Dwight Fisher	Tropical Bowl	Morris Brown	L 0–21
December 6, 1952	Dwight Fisher	Lions Bowl	Grambling	L 13–27
December 7, 1968	Marino Casem	Orange Blossom Classic	Florida A&M	W 36-9

== Rivalry game ==
The Alcorn State Braves biggest rival is against the Jackson State Tigers in the Soul Bowl. The rivalry was previously named the Capital City Classic, but Alcorn ended the Classic in 2012 so that it could be brought back to Lorman, Mississippi.

== College Football Hall of Fame members ==
- Marino Casem
- Steve McNair
- Dennis Thomas

== Alumni in the NFL ==
Over 50 Alcorn State alumni have played in the NFL, including:

- Milton Barney
- Charles Coleman
- Donald Driver
- Smith Reed
- Leonard Fairley
- Leslie Frazier
- Marcus Hinton
- Billy Howard
- Nate Hughes
- Garry Lewis
- Steve McNair
- Bryant Mix
- Lawrence Pillers
- Elex Price
- Jack Spinks
- John Thierry
- Roynell Young
- Henry Bradley
- Willie Young
- Jimmie Giles

== Head coaches ==
Alcorn State has seen 21 head football coaches over its history. The program was most recently led by Fred McNair.

Coach	Seasons	Record	Win Pct.
Octavius T. Henderson	1921	4–0	1.000
O. A. Ross	1922–1933	44–15–11	.629
W. Morton	1934–1935	1–7–1	.125
A. A. Abraham	1936, 1938, 1941–1942	14–8–7	.483
L. Harris	1937, 1939–1940	10–10–1	.476
J. Anderson	1945	0–2	.000
Reuben Alba	1946	1–8	.111
W. Felix Harris	1947	9–1	.900
Dwight Fisher	1948–1956	52–35–7	0.553
Wallace Broadus	1957	0–5	.000
E. E. Simmons	1958–1959	3–14	.176
Frank Purnell	1960–1963	14–20	.412
Marino Casem	1964–1985	138–71–8	.636
Theophilus Danzy	1986–1990	26–22	.542
Cardell Jones	1991–1997	41–32–3	.539
Johnny Thomas	1998–2007	48–61	.440
Ernest T. Jones	2008	2–10	.167
Earnest Collins Jr.	2009–2010	8–12	.400
Melvin Spears	2011	2–8	.200
Jay Hopson	2012–2015	19–17^{a}	.528
Fred McNair	2016–2023	48–33	.593
Cedric Thomas	2024–present	11–12	.478

== Future non-conference opponents ==
Announced schedules as of July 31, 2026

2026	2027	2028	2029
Miles College	at TCU	at Ole Miss	vs South Carolina State (Atlanta, GA); MEAC/SWAC Challenge
at Southern Miss			
at North Alabama			
Arkansas Baptist			

== Notes ==
^a Hopson went 4–7 and 9–3 in the 2012 and 2013 seasons, respectively, but the school's wins from these seasons were vacated due to NCAA violations

== See also ==
- Southern Heritage Classic
- List of black college football classics
