= Simmons Bank Field =

Multi-purpose stadium in Pine Bluff, Arkansas

- Interactive map of Simmons Bank Field
- Location: Pine Bluff, Arkansas
- Coordinates: 34°15′12″N 92°1′16″W
- Owner: University of Arkansas at Pine Bluff
- Capacity: 16,000
- Surface: GeoGreen

Construction
- Opened: 2000
- Cost: $14.0 million
- Architects: Nelson Architectural Group, Inc.

Tenant
- Arkansas–Pine Bluff Golden Lions (NCAA) (2000–present)

Simmons Bank Field is a 16,000-seat multi-purpose stadium in Pine Bluff, Arkansas. Built at a cost of $14 million, it opened in 2000 and is home to the University of Arkansas at Pine Bluff Golden Lions football team. Originally called Golden Lion Stadium, it was renamed for Pine Bluff-based Simmons Bank after the company donated $2.5 million to the university to upgrade the football stadium in 2018.

== See also ==
- List of NCAA Division I FCS football stadiums
