= Casem-Spinks Stadium =

Stadium in Lorman, Mississippi, US

Spinks-Casem-Stadium
- Interactive map of Spinks-Casem-Stadium
- Full name: Marino Casem-Jack Spinks Stadium
- Location: Lorman, Mississippi
- Coordinates: 31.873545°N 91.134918°W
- Owner: Alcorn State University
- Operator: Alcorn State University
- Capacity: 22,500
- Surface: Grass

Construction
- Built: 1991–1992
- Opened: September 19, 1992
- Architect: Cooke Douglass Farr Lemons

Tenant
- Alcorn State Braves (NCAA)

The Casem Spinks Stadium is a 22,500-seat multi-purpose stadium in Lorman, Mississippi, which is the home field of the Alcorn State Braves college football team. The stadium is surrounded by the campus of Alcorn State University and is adjacent to the Davey Whitney Complex.

== History ==
Opened in 1992, the stadium replaced Henderson Stadium. Its name is derived from former Alcorn State Braves football player Jack Spinks. The name was changed to the Marino Casem-Jack Spinks Memorial Stadium in 2011 after then Alcorn State president M. Christopher Brown II stated "Coach Casem helped Alcorn athletics increase both in stature and in reputation to become a nationally recognized university".

== See also ==
- List of NCAA Division I FCS football stadiums
