= 2011 Texas Southern Tigers football team =

American college football season

2011 Texas Southern Tigers football
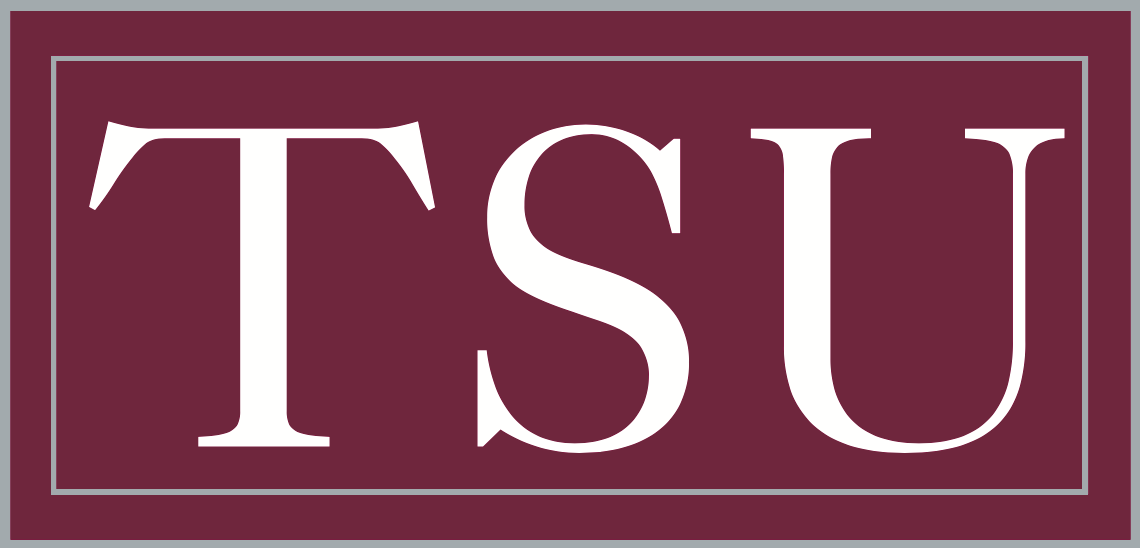
- Conference: Southwestern Athletic Conference
- West Division
- Record: 4–7 (2–7 SWAC)
- Head coach: Kevin Ramsey (interim, 1st season)
- Defensive coordinator: Tremaine Jackson (1st season)
- Home stadium: Delmar Stadium; Reliant Stadium

2011 Southwestern Athletic Conference football standings
	Conf.			Overall
Team	W		L	W		L
East Division
No. 21 Jackson State x	7	–	2	9	–	2
Alabama State x	7	–	2	8	–	3
Alabama A&M xy	7	–	2	8	–	4
Alcorn State	1	–	8	2	–	8
Mississippi Valley State	1	–	8	1	–	10
West Division
Grambling State xy$	6	–	3	8	–	4
Arkansas–Pine Bluff	5	–	4	6	–	5
Prairie View A&M	5	–	4	5	–	6
Southern	4	–	5	4	–	7
Texas Southern	2	–	7	4	–	7
Championship: Grambling State 16, Alabama A&M 15
$ – Conference champion; x – Division champion/co-champions; y – Championship game participant; Jackson State and Southern were ineligible to participate in the SWAC Championship Game due to low APR scores.; Rankings from The Sports Network Poll

The 2011 Texas Southern Tigers football team represented Texas Southern University a member of the West Division of the Southwestern Athletic Conference (SWAC) during the 2011 NCAA Division I FCS football season. Led by first-year interim head coach Kevin Ramsey, the Tigers compiled an overall record of 4–7 with a mark of 2–7 in conference play, placing last out of five team in the SWAC's West Division. Texas Southern played four home games at Delmar Stadium and two at Reliant Stadium.

== Schedule ==
Date	Time	Opponent	Site	TV	Result	Attendance	Source
September 10	7:00 pm	Prairie View A&M	Delmar Stadium; Houston, TX	ESPNU	L 34–37	12,567	
September 17	6:00 pm	Texas College*	Delmar Stadium; Houston, TX		W 49–6	18,629	
September 24	1:00 pm	Alcorn State	Delmar Stadium; Houston, TX		W 14–7	2,735	
September 29	6:30 pm	at Jackson State	Mississippi Veterans Memorial Stadium; Jackson, MS	ESPNU	L 13–58	26,000	
October 8	2:00 pm	Alabama State	Delmar Stadium; Houston, TX		L 29–43	3,251	
October 13	6:30 pm	at Alabama A&M	Louis Crews Stadium; Huntsville, AL	ESPNU	L 21–24	5,386	
October 22	3:00 pm	Central State (OH)*^{†}	Delmar Stadium; Houston, TX		W 42–11	7,319	
October 29	3:00 pm	at Mississippi Valley State	Rice–Totten Field; Itta Bena, MS		L 9–12	7,839	
November 5	6:00 pm	Southern	Reliant Stadium; Houston, TX		W 29–15	10,543	
November 12	7:00 pm	at Grambling State	Eddie Robinson Stadium; Grambling, LA	SWAC TV	L 25–29	7,142	
November 19	3:30 pm	at Arkansas–Pine Bluff	Golden Lion Stadium; Pine Bluff, AR		L 6–42	8,721	
*Non-conference game; ^{†}Homecoming; All times are in Central time
