= 2011 Mississippi Valley State Delta Devils football team =

American college football season

2011 Mississippi Valley State Delta Devils football
- Conference: Southwestern Athletic Conference
- East Division
- Record: 1–10 (1–8 SWAC)
- Head coach: Karl Morgan (2nd season)
- Offensive coordinator: Ramon Flanigan (2nd season)
- Home stadium: Rice–Totten Stadium

2011 Southwestern Athletic Conference football standings
	Conf.			Overall
Team	W		L	W		L
East Division
No. 21 Jackson State x	7	–	2	9	–	2
Alabama State x	7	–	2	8	–	3
Alabama A&M xy	7	–	2	8	–	4
Alcorn State	1	–	8	2	–	8
Mississippi Valley State	1	–	8	1	–	10
West Division
Grambling State xy$	6	–	3	8	–	4
Arkansas–Pine Bluff	5	–	4	6	–	5
Prairie View A&M	5	–	4	5	–	6
Southern	4	–	5	4	–	7
Texas Southern	2	–	7	4	–	7
Championship: Grambling State 16, Alabama A&M 15
$ – Conference champion; x – Division champion/co-champions; y – Championship game participant; Jackson State and Southern were ineligible to participate in the SWAC Championship Game due to low APR scores.; Rankings from The Sports Network Poll

The 2011 Mississippi Valley State Delta Devils football team represented Mississippi Valley State University as a member of the East Division of the Southwestern Athletic Conference (SWAC) during the 2011 NCAA Division I FCS football season. Led by second-year head coach Karl Morgan, the Delta Devils compiled an overall record of 1–10 and a mark of 1–8 in conference play, tying for fourth place in the SWAC's East Division. Mississippi Valley State played home games at Rice–Totten Stadium in Itta Bena, Mississippi.

== Schedule ==
Date	Time	Opponent	Site	Result	Attendance
September 3	5:00 pm	Alabama State	Rice–Totten Stadium; Itta Bena, MS	L 9–41	3,780
September 10	4:00 pm	Murray State*	Rice–Totten Stadium; Itta Bena, MS	L 0–39	2,209
September 17	4:00 pm	at Alcorn State	Casem-Spinks Stadium; Lorman, MS	L 14–39	13,500
September 24	7:00 pm	at Prairie View A&M	Edward L. Blackshear Field; Prairie View, TX	L 34–43	5,149
October 1	2:00 pm	Southern	Rice–Totten Stadium; Itta Bena, MS	L 21–28	4,982
October 8	1:00 pm	at Alabama A&M	Louis Crews Stadium; Huntsville, AL	L 14–37	16,827
October 15	2:00 pm	No. 25 Jackson State	Rice–Totten Stadium; Itta Bena, MS	L 16–17	9,420
October 22	2:00 pm	at Grambling State	Eddie Robinson Stadium; Grambling, LA	L 24–30	11,137
October 29	2:00 pm	Texas Southern^{†}	Rice–Totten Stadium; Itta Bena, MS	W 12–9	7,839
November 3	6:30 pm	at South Alabama*	Ladd–Peebles Stadium; Mobile, AL	L 3–35	13,807
November 12	1:00 pm	Arkansas–Pine Bluff	Rice–Totten Stadium; Itta Bena, MS	L 3–15	4,209
*Non-conference game; ^{†}Homecoming; Rankings from The Sports Network Poll released prior to the game; All times are in Central time
