= 2011 Arkansas–Pine Bluff Golden Lions football team =

American college football season

2011 Arkansas-Pine Bluff Golden Lions football
- Conference: Southwestern Athletic Conference
- West Division
- Record: 6–5 (5–4 SWAC)
- Head coach: Monte Coleman (4th season)
- Home stadium: Golden Lion Stadium

2011 Southwestern Athletic Conference football standings
	Conf.			Overall
Team	W		L	W		L
East Division
No. 21 Jackson State x	7	–	2	9	–	2
Alabama State x	7	–	2	8	–	3
Alabama A&M xy	7	–	2	8	–	4
Alcorn State	1	–	8	2	–	8
Mississippi Valley State	1	–	8	1	–	10
West Division
Grambling State xy$	6	–	3	8	–	4
Arkansas–Pine Bluff	5	–	4	6	–	5
Prairie View A&M	5	–	4	5	–	6
Southern	4	–	5	4	–	7
Texas Southern	2	–	7	4	–	7
Championship: Grambling State 16, Alabama A&M 15
$ – Conference champion; x – Division champion/co-champions; y – Championship game participant; Jackson State and Southern were ineligible to participate in the SWAC Championship Game due to low APR scores.; Rankings from The Sports Network Poll

The 2011 Arkansas–Pine Bluff Golden Lions football team represented the University of Arkansas at Pine Bluff in the 2011 NCAA Division I FCS football season. The Golden Lions were led by fourth year head coach Monte Coleman and played their home games at Golden Lion Stadium. They were a member of the West Division of the Southwestern Athletic Conference and finished the 2011 season with an overall record of 6–5.

== Schedule ==
Date	Time	Opponent	Site	Result	Attendance
September 3	5:00 pm	vs. Langston*	War Memorial Stadium; Little Rock, AR (Delta Classic)	L 12–19	24,474
September 10	6:00 pm	Alcorn State	Golden Lion Stadium; Pine Bluff, AR	W 27–20	9,281
September 17	6:00 pm	at Prairie View A&M	Edward L. Blackshear Field; Prairie View, TX	W 36–29	6,034
September 24	3:00 pm	vs. Clark Atlanta*	Edward Jones Dome; St. Louis, MO (Gateway Classic)	W 9–7	19,245
October 1	6:00 pm	at Alabama A&M	Louis Crews Stadium; Huntsville, AL	L 27–28	5,136
October 8	4:00 pm	at Jackson State	Mississippi Veterans Memorial Stadium; Jackson, MS	L 10–48	38,722
October 15	6:00 pm	Southern	Golden Lion Stadium; Pine Bluff, AR	W 22–21	9,742
October 29	2:30 pm	Grambling State	Golden Lion Stadium; Pine Bluff, AR	L 20–27	9,202
November 5	2:30 pm	Alabama State^{†}	Golden Lion Stadium; Pine Bluff, AR	L 12–28	13,473
November 12	1:00 pm	at Mississippi Valley State	Rice–Totten Field; Itta Bena, MS	W 15–3	4,209
November 19	2:30 pm	Texas Southern	Golden Lion Stadium; Pine Bluff, AR	W 42–6	8,721
*Non-conference game; ^{†}Homecoming; All times are in Central time
