= 2011 Southern Jaguars football team =

American college football season

2011 Southern Jaguars football
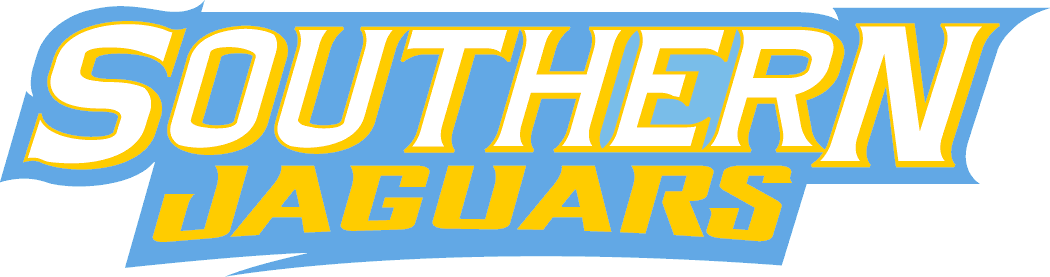
- Conference: Southwestern Athletic Conference
- West Division
- Record: 4–7 (4–5 SWAC)
- Head coach: Stump Mitchell (2nd season)
- Offensive coordinator: Ricky Diggs
- Defensive coordinator: O'Neill Gilbert
- Home stadium: Ace W. Mumford Stadium

2011 Southwestern Athletic Conference football standings
	Conf.			Overall
Team	W		L	W		L
East Division
No. 21 Jackson State x	7	–	2	9	–	2
Alabama State x	7	–	2	8	–	3
Alabama A&M xy	7	–	2	8	–	4
Alcorn State	1	–	8	2	–	8
Mississippi Valley State	1	–	8	1	–	10
West Division
Grambling State xy$	6	–	3	8	–	4
Arkansas–Pine Bluff	5	–	4	6	–	5
Prairie View A&M	5	–	4	5	–	6
Southern	4	–	5	4	–	7
Texas Southern	2	–	7	4	–	7
Championship: Grambling State 16, Alabama A&M 15
$ – Conference champion; x – Division champion/co-champions; y – Championship game participant; Jackson State and Southern were ineligible to participate in the SWAC Championship Game due to low APR scores.; Rankings from The Sports Network Poll

The 2011 Southern Jaguars football team was an American football team that represented Southern University as a member of the West Division of the Southwestern Athletic Conference (SWAC) during the 2011 NCAA Division I FCS football season. Led by second-year head coach Stump Mitchell, the Jaguars compiled an overall record of 4–7 with a mark of 4–5 in conference play, placing fourth in the SWAC's West Division. Southern played their home games at Ace W. Mumford Stadium in Baton Rouge, Louisiana.

== Schedule ==
Date	Time	Opponent	Site	TV	Result	Attendance
September 3	6:00 pm	at Tennessee State*	LP Field; Nashville, TN		L 7–33	25,209
September 10	6:00 pm	Alabama A&M	Ace W. Mumford Stadium; Baton Rouge, LA		W 21–6	9,020
September 17	6:00 pm	Jackson State	Ace W. Mumford Stadium; Baton Rouge, LA (rivalry)		L 24–28	21,734
September 24	3:30 pm	vs. Florida A&M*	Georgia Dome; Atlanta, GA (Atlanta Football Classic)	Versus	L 33–38	59,373
October 1	2:00 pm	at Mississippi Valley State	Rice–Totten Field; Itta Bena, MS		W 28–21	4,982
October 8	6:00 pm	Prairie View A&M	Ace W. Mumford Stadium; Baton Rouge, LA		L 20–23	8,951
October 15	6:00 pm	at Arkansas-Pine Bluff	Golden Lion Stadium; Pine Bluff, AR		L 21–22	9,742
October 29	5:30 pm	Alcorn State^{†}	Ace W. Mumford Stadium; Baton Rouge, LA		W 30–14	15,011
November 5	6:00 pm	at Texas Southern	Reliant Stadium; Houston, TX		L 15–29	10,543
November 12	1:00 pm	at No. 23 Alabama State	Cramton Bowl; Montgomery, AL		W 26–23	8,255
November 26	1:00 pm	vs. Grambling State	Mercedes-Benz Superdome; New Orleans, LA (Bayou Classic)	NBC	L 12–36	40,715
*Non-conference game; ^{†}Homecoming; Rankings from The Sports Network Poll released prior to the game; All times are in Central time
