= 2011 Prairie View A&M Panthers football team =

American college football season

2011 Prairie View A&M Panthers football
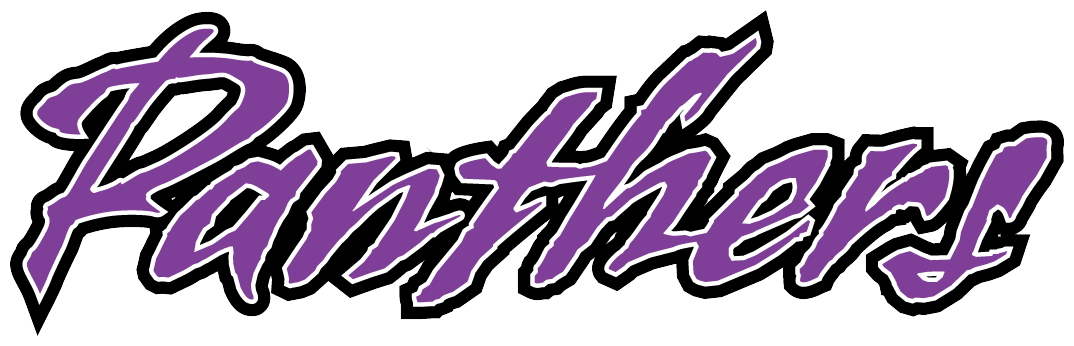
- Conference: Southwestern Athletic Conference
- West Division
- Record: 5–6 (5–4 SWAC)
- Head coach: Heishma Northern (1st season)
- Offensive coordinator: Mark Orlando (1st season)
- Home stadium: Edward L. Blackshear Field

2011 Southwestern Athletic Conference football standings
	Conf.			Overall
Team	W		L	W		L
East Division
No. 21 Jackson State x	7	–	2	9	–	2
Alabama State x	7	–	2	8	–	3
Alabama A&M xy	7	–	2	8	–	4
Alcorn State	1	–	8	2	–	8
Mississippi Valley State	1	–	8	1	–	10
West Division
Grambling State xy$	6	–	3	8	–	4
Arkansas–Pine Bluff	5	–	4	6	–	5
Prairie View A&M	5	–	4	5	–	6
Southern	4	–	5	4	–	7
Texas Southern	2	–	7	4	–	7
Championship: Grambling State 16, Alabama A&M 15
$ – Conference champion; x – Division champion/co-champions; y – Championship game participant; Jackson State and Southern were ineligible to participate in the SWAC Championship Game due to low APR scores.; Rankings from The Sports Network Poll

The 2011 Prairie View A&M Panthers football team represented Prairie View A&M University as a member of the West Division of the Southwestern Athletic Conference (SWAC) during the 2011 NCAA Division I FCS football season. The Panthers were led by first year head coach Heishma Northern and played their home games at Edward L. Blackshear Field. Prairie View A&M finished the season with an overall record of 5–6 and a conference mark of 5–4, tying for second place in the West Division.

== Schedule ==
Date	Time	Opponent	Site	TV	Result	Attendance
September 4	11:00 am	vs. Bethune-Cookman*	Florida Citrus Bowl; Orlando, FL (MEAC/SWAC Challenge)	ESPN	L 14–63	17,337
September 10	7:00 pm	at Texas Southern	Reliant Stadium; Houston, TX	ESPNU	W 37–34	12,567
September 17	6:00 pm	Arkansas–Pine Bluff	Edward L. Blackshear Field; Prairie View, TX		L 29–36	6,034
September 24	6:00 pm	Mississippi Valley State	Edward L. Blackshear Field; Prairie View, TX		W 43–34	5,149
October 1	6:00 pm	vs. Grambling State	Cotton Bowl; Dallas, TX (State Fair Classic)		W 31–23	37,311
October 8	6:00 pm	at Southern	Ace W. Mumford Stadium; Baton Rouge, LA		W 23–20	8,951
October 15	1:00 pm	at No. 24 Alabama State	Cramton Bowl; Montgomery, AL		L 7–20	12,564
October 29	4:00 pm	vs. No. 19 Jackson State	Independence Stadium; Shreveport, LA (Shreveport Classic)		L 14–44	17,743
November 5	3:00 pm	at Texas State*	Bobcat Stadium; San Marcos, TX		L 26–34	14,222
November 12	2:00 pm	at Alcorn State	Casem-Spinks Stadium; Lorman, MS		W 40–14	500
November 19	1:00 pm	Alabama A&M^{†}	Edward L. Blackshear Field; Prairie View, TX		L 15–17	10,500
*Non-conference game; ^{†}Homecoming; Rankings from The Sports Network Poll released prior to the game; All times are in Central time
