= 2011 Jackson State Tigers football team =

American college football season

2011 Jackson State Tigers football

SWAC East Division co-champion
- Conference: Southwestern Athletic Conference
- East Division

Ranking
- Sports Network: No. 21
- FCS Coaches: No. 18
- Record: 9–2 (7–2 SWAC)
- Head coach: Rick Comegy (6th season)
- Offensive coordinator: Earnest Wilson (2nd season)
- Home stadium: Mississippi Veterans Memorial Stadium

2011 Southwestern Athletic Conference football standings
	Conf.			Overall
Team	W		L	W		L
East Division
No. 21 Jackson State x	7	–	2	9	–	2
Alabama State x	7	–	2	8	–	3
Alabama A&M xy	7	–	2	8	–	4
Alcorn State	1	–	8	2	–	8
Mississippi Valley State	1	–	8	1	–	10
West Division
Grambling State xy$	6	–	3	8	–	4
Arkansas–Pine Bluff	5	–	4	6	–	5
Prairie View A&M	5	–	4	5	–	6
Southern	4	–	5	4	–	7
Texas Southern	2	–	7	4	–	7
Championship: Grambling State 16, Alabama A&M 15
$ – Conference champion; x – Division champion/co-champions; y – Championship game participant; Jackson State and Southern were ineligible to participate in the SWAC Championship Game due to low APR scores.; Rankings from The Sports Network Poll

The 2011 Jackson State Tigers football team represented Jackson State University as a member of the East Division of the Southwestern Athletic Conference (SWAC) during the 2011 NCAA Division I FCS football season. Led by sixth-year head coach Rick Comegy, the Tigers compiled an overall record of 9–2 with a mark of 7–2 in conference play, sharing SWAC East Division title with Alabama A&M and Alabama State. Alabama A&M advanced to SWAC Football Championship Game by virtue of a head-to-head win over the Alabama State, while Jackson State was ineligible for postseason play due to low Academic Progress Rate (APR) scores. The Tigers played their home games at Mississippi Veterans Memorial Stadium in Jackson, Mississippi.

== Schedule ==
Date	Time	Opponent	Rank	Site	TV	Result	Attendance
September 3	1:30 pm	Concordia (AL)*		Mississippi Veterans Memorial Stadium; Jackson, MS		W 42–2	4,911
September 10	6:00 pm	vs. Tennessee State*		Liberty Bowl Memorial Stadium; Memphis, TN (Southern Heritage Classic)		W 35–29	43,532
September 17	6:00 pm	at Southern		Ace W. Mumford Stadium; Baton Rouge, LA (rivalry)		W 28–24	21,734
September 24	4:00 pm	Alabama State		Mississippi Veterans Memorial Stadium; Jackson, MS		L 14–21	16,286
September 29	6:30 pm	Texas Southern		Mississippi Veterans Memorial Stadium; Jackson, MS	ESPNU	W 58–13	26,000
October 8	4:00 pm	Arkansas–Pine Bluff		Mississippi Veterans Memorial Stadium; Jackson, MS		W 48–10	38,722
October 15	2:00 pm	at Mississippi Valley State	No. 25	Rice–Totten Field; Itta Bena, MS		W 17–16	9,420
October 29	4:00 pm	vs. Prairie View A&M	No. 19	Independence Stadium; Shreveport, LA (Shreveport Classic)		W 44–14	17,743
November 5	2:00 pm	Grambling State	No. 15	Mississippi Veterans Memorial Stadium; Jackson, MS		L 23–26	21,576
November 12	1:00 pm	at Alabama A&M	No. 21	Louis Crews Stadium; Huntsville, AL		W 34–6	5,831
November 19	1:00 pm	Alcorn State	No. 21	Mississippi Veterans Memorial Stadium; Jackson, MS (Capital City Classic)		W 51–7	31,501
*Non-conference game; Rankings from The Sports Network Poll released prior to the game; All times are in Central time
