= 2011 Alabama State Hornets football team =

American college football season

2011 Alabama State Hornets football
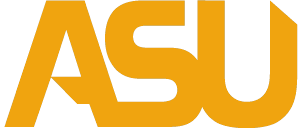

SWAC East Division co-champion
- Conference: Southwestern Athletic Conference
- East Division
- Record: 8–3 (7–2 SWAC)
- Head coach: Reggie Barlow (5th season)
- Offensive coordinator: Fred Kaiss (1st season)
- Defensive coordinator: Cedric Thornton (2nd season)
- Home stadium: Cramton Bowl

2011 Southwestern Athletic Conference football standings
	Conf.			Overall
Team	W		L	W		L
East Division
No. 21 Jackson State x	7	–	2	9	–	2
Alabama State x	7	–	2	8	–	3
Alabama A&M xy	7	–	2	8	–	4
Alcorn State	1	–	8	2	–	8
Mississippi Valley State	1	–	8	1	–	10
West Division
Grambling State xy$	6	–	3	8	–	4
Arkansas–Pine Bluff	5	–	4	6	–	5
Prairie View A&M	5	–	4	5	–	6
Southern	4	–	5	4	–	7
Texas Southern	2	–	7	4	–	7
Championship: Grambling State 16, Alabama A&M 15
$ – Conference champion; x – Division champion/co-champions; y – Championship game participant; Jackson State and Southern were ineligible to participate in the SWAC Championship Game due to low APR scores.; Rankings from The Sports Network Poll

The 2011 Alabama State Hornets football team represented Alabama State University as a member of the East Division of the Southwestern Athletic Conference (SWAC) during the 2011 NCAA Division I FCS football season. Led by fifth-year head coach Reggie Barlow, the Hornets compiled an overall record of 8–3 with a mark of 7–2 in conference play, sharing SWAC East Division title with Alabama A&M and Southern. Alabama A&M advanced to SWAC Football Championship Game by virtue of a head-to-head win over the Alabama State, while Southern was ineligible for postseason play due to low Academic Progress Rate (APR) scores. Alabama State played home games at Cramton Bowl in Montgomery, Alabama.

== Schedule ==
Date	Time	Opponent	Rank	Site	TV	Result	Attendance
September 3	5:00 pm	at Mississippi Valley State		Rice–Totten Field; Itta Bena, MS		W 41–9	3,780
September 10	1:00 pm	at Eastern Michigan*		Rynearson Stadium; Ypsilanti, MI		L 7–14	4,771
September 17	7:00 pm	Grambling State		Cramton Bowl; Montgomery, AL		W 31–17	11,563
September 24	4:00 pm	at Jackson State		Mississippi Veterans Memorial Stadium; Jackson, MS		W 21–14	16,286
October 1	6:00 pm	Alcorn State		Cramton Bowl; Montgomery, AL		W 31–23	9,686
October 8	1:00 pm	at Texas Southern		Delmar Stadium; Houston, TX		W 43–29	3,851
October 15	1:00 pm	Prairie View A&M	No. 24	Cramton Bowl; Montgomery, AL		W 20–7	12,564
October 29	2:30 pm	vs. Alabama A&M	No. 16	Legion Field; Birmingham, AL (Magic City Classic)		L 19–20	66,473
November 5	2:30 pm	at Arkansas–Pine Bluff		Golden Lion Stadium; Pine Bluff, AR		W 28–12	13,473
November 12	1:00 pm	Southern	No. 23	Cramton Bowl; Montgomery, AL		L 23–26	8,255
November 24	3:00 pm	Tuskegee*		Cramton Bowl; Montgomery, AL (Turkey Day Classic)	ESPNU	W 30–21	18,587
*Non-conference game; Rankings from The Sports Network Poll released prior to the game; All times are in Central time
