= 2011 Alcorn State Braves football team =

American college football season

2011 Alcorn State Braves football
- Conference: Southwestern Athletic Conference
- East Division
- Record: 2–8 (1–8 SWAC)
- Head coach: Melvin Spears (1st season)
- Home stadium: Casem-Spinks Stadium

2011 Southwestern Athletic Conference football standings
	Conf.			Overall
Team	W		L	W		L
East Division
No. 21 Jackson State x	7	–	2	9	–	2
Alabama State x	7	–	2	8	–	3
Alabama A&M xy	7	–	2	8	–	4
Alcorn State	1	–	8	2	–	8
Mississippi Valley State	1	–	8	1	–	10
West Division
Grambling State xy$	6	–	3	8	–	4
Arkansas–Pine Bluff	5	–	4	6	–	5
Prairie View A&M	5	–	4	5	–	6
Southern	4	–	5	4	–	7
Texas Southern	2	–	7	4	–	7
Championship: Grambling State 16, Alabama A&M 15
$ – Conference champion; x – Division champion/co-champions; y – Championship game participant; Jackson State and Southern were ineligible to participate in the SWAC Championship Game due to low APR scores.; Rankings from The Sports Network Poll

The 2011 Alcorn State Braves football team represented Alcorn State University as a member of the East Division of the Southwestern Athletic Conference during the 2011 NCAA Division I FCS football season. Led by first-year head coach Melvin Spears, the Braves compiled an overall record of 2–8 with a mark of 1–8 in conference play, tying for fourth place in the SWAC's East Division. The team played home games at Casem-Spinks Stadium in Lorman, Mississippi.

== Schedule ==
Date	Time	Opponent	Site	Result	Attendance
September 3	6:00 pm	vs. Grambling State	Independence Stadium; Shreveport, LA (Port City Classic)	L 14–21	4,204
September 10	6:00 pm	at Arkansas–Pine Bluff	Golden Lion Stadium; Pine Bluff, AR	L 20–27	9,281
September 17	4:00 pm	Mississippi Valley State	Casem-Spinks Stadium; Lorman, MS	W 39–14	13,500
September 24	1:00 pm	at Texas Southern	Delmar Stadium; Houston, TX	L 7–14	2,735
October 1	6:00 pm	at Alabama State	Cramton Bowl; Montgomery, AL	L 23–31	9,686
October 22	2:00 pm	Concordia (AL)*^{†}	Casem-Spinks Stadium; Lorman, MS	W 58–16	16,000
October 29	5:30 pm	at Southern	Ace W. Mumford Stadium; Baton Rouge, LA	L 14–30	15,011
November 5	6:00 pm	Alabama A&M	Casem-Spinks Stadium; Lorman, MS	L 14–28	2,500
November 12	2:00 pm	Prairie View A&M	Casem-Spinks Stadium; Lorman, MS	L 14–40	500
November 19	2:00 pm	at No. 21 Jackson State	Mississippi Veterans Memorial Stadium; Jackson, MS (Capital City Classic)	L 7–51	31,501
*Non-conference game; ^{†}Homecoming; Rankings from The Sports Network Poll released prior to the game; All times are in Central time
