= Melvin Spears =

American football player and coach (born 1960)

Biographical details
- Born: January 16, 1960 (age 66); Clinton, Louisiana, U.S.

Playing career
- 1980–1981: Alcorn State
- Positions: Quarterback, wide receiver

Coaching career (HC unless noted)
- 1992–1994: Casa Grande Union HS (AZ) (DC)
- 1995–1997: Morgan State (DC)
- 1998–2003: Grambling State (OC)
- 2004–2006: Grambling State
- 2008: Texas Southern (WR)
- 2009: Texas Southern (RB)
- 2010: Alabama State (OC)
- 2011: Alcorn State

Head coaching record
- Overall: 22–22

Accomplishments and honors

Championships
- 1 SWAC (2005)

Awards
- SWAC Coach of the Year (2005)

Melvin Spears (born January 16, 1960) is an American former football coach. He served as the head football coach at Grambling State University from 2004 to 2006 and Alcorn State University in 2011, compiling a career college football head coaching record of 22–22. Spears was a coach at Texas Southern University, working with the wide receivers in 2008 then moving over to running backs the following year. He served as the offensive coordinator of Alabama State University during the 2010 season. Spears was selected on January 19, 2011, to the post of head coach of his alma mater, Alcorn State. Spears was fired by Alcorn State on February 24, 2012. He had previously been placed on administrative leave.

== Head coaching record ==
Year	Team	Overall	Conference	Standing	Bowl/playoffs
Grambling State Tigers (Southwestern Athletic Conference) (2004–2006)
2004	Grambling State	6–5	3–4	3rd (West)	
2005	Grambling State	11–1	9–0	1st (West)	
2006	Grambling State	3–8	3–6	T–3rd (West)	
Grambling State:		20–14	15–10		
Alcorn State Braves (Southwestern Athletic Conference) (2011)
2011	Alcorn State	2–8	1–8	T–4th (East)	
Alcorn State:		2–8	1–8		
Total:		22–22			
National championship Conference title Conference division title or championship game berth
