= 2011 Alabama A&M Bulldogs football team =

American college football season

2011 Alabama A&M Bulldogs football
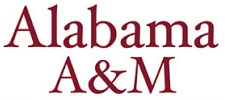

SWAC East Division co-champion

SWAC Football Championship Game, L 15–16 vs. Grambling State
- Conference: Southwestern Athletic Conference
- East Division
- Record: 8–4 (7–2 SWAC)
- Head coach: Anthony Jones (10th season)
- Offensive coordinator: Cedric Pearl (5th season)
- Defensive coordinator: Brawnski Towns
- Home stadium: Louis Crews Stadium

2011 Southwestern Athletic Conference football standings
	Conf.			Overall
Team	W		L	W		L
East Division
No. 21 Jackson State x	7	–	2	9	–	2
Alabama State x	7	–	2	8	–	3
Alabama A&M xy	7	–	2	8	–	4
Alcorn State	1	–	8	2	–	8
Mississippi Valley State	1	–	8	1	–	10
West Division
Grambling State xy$	6	–	3	8	–	4
Arkansas–Pine Bluff	5	–	4	6	–	5
Prairie View A&M	5	–	4	5	–	6
Southern	4	–	5	4	–	7
Texas Southern	2	–	7	4	–	7
Championship: Grambling State 16, Alabama A&M 15
$ – Conference champion; x – Division champion/co-champions; y – Championship game participant; Jackson State and Southern were ineligible to participate in the SWAC Championship Game due to low APR scores.; Rankings from The Sports Network Poll

The 2011 Alabama A&M Bulldogs football team represented Alabama A&M University as a member of the East Division of the Southwestern Athletic Conference (SWAC) during the 2011 NCAA Division I FCS football season. Led by tenth-year head coach Anthony Jones, the Bulldogs compiled an overall record of 8–4 with a mark of 7–2 in conference play, sharing SWAC East Division title with Alabama State and Southern. Alabama A&M advanced to SWAC Football Championship Game by virtue of a head-to-head win over the Alabama State, while Southern was ineligible for postseason play due to low Academic Progress Rate (APR) scores. The Bulldogs lost the SWAC title game to Grambling State, 16–15. Alabama A&M played their home games at Louis Crews Stadium in Huntsville, Alabama.

== Schedule ==
Date	Time	Opponent	Site	TV	Result	Attendance	Source
September 3	5:00 pm	vs. Hampton*	Soldier Field; Chicago, IL (Chicago Football Classic)		L 20–21	35,653	
September 10	6:00 pm	at Southern	Ace W. Mumford Stadium; Baton Rouge, LA		L 6–21	9,020	
September 17	6:00 pm	Tuskegee*	Louis Crews Stadium; Huntsville, AL		W 21–6	18,629	
September 24	5:00 pm	at Grambling State	Eddie Robinson Stadium; Grambling, LA		W 20–14	7,118	
October 1	6:00 pm	Arkansas–Pine Bluff	Louis Crews Stadium; Huntsville, AL		W 28–27	5,136	
October 8	1:00 pm	Mississippi Valley State^{†}	Louis Crews Stadium; Huntsville, AL		W 37–14	16,827	
October 13	6:30 pm	Texas Southern	Louis Crews Stadium; Huntsville, AL	ESPNU	W 24–21	5,386	
October 29	2:30 pm	vs. No. 16 Alabama State	Legion Field; Birmingham, AL (Magic City Classic)		W 20–19	66,473	
November 5	2:00 pm	at Alcorn State	Casem-Spinks Stadium; Lorman, MS		W 28–14	2,500	
November 12	1:00 pm	No. 21 Jackson State	Louis Crews Stadium; Huntsville, AL		L 6–34	5,831	
November 19	1:00 pm	at Prairie View A&M	Edward L. Blackshear Field; Prairie View, TX		W 17–15	10,500	
December 10	12:00 pm	vs. Grambling State*	Legion Field; Birmingham, AL (SWAC Football Championship Game)	ESPNU	L 15–16	23,476	
*Non-conference game; ^{†}Homecoming; Rankings from The Sports Network Poll released prior to the game; All times are in Central time
