= Kevin Ramsey =

American football player and coach (born 1961)

Biographical details
- Born: September 5, 1961 (age 65); East St. Louis, Illinois, U.S.

Playing career
- 1980–1983: Indiana State
- Position: Defensive back

Coaching career (HC unless noted)
- 1984–1985: Kansas State (GA)
- 1986: Mission HS (TX) (JV/DC)
- 1987–1989: Kansas State (OLB)
- 1990–1992: Northwestern (DL/DB)
- 1993–1994: West Virginia (DB)
- 1995–1998: Tennessee (DB)
- 1999: Georgia (DC)
- 2000: Michigan (DB)
- 2000–2002: Arizona Cardinals (DB)
- 2003: Arizona State (CB)
- 2004–2008: Carson–Newman (DC)
- 2009–2010: Texas Southern (DC)
- 2011: Texas Southern (interim HC)
- 2012: Texas Southern (DC)
- 2013–2014: Alabama State (DC)
- 2015–2018: Clark Atlanta
- 2020: Mountain Pointe HS (AZ) (DC)

Head coaching record
- Overall: 17–33

Kevin Ramsey (born September 5, 1961) is an American former football player and coach. Ramsey served as the interim head football coach at Texas Southern University in 2011 and the head football coach at Clark Atlanta University from 2015 to 2018.

Ramsey was born and raised in East St. Louis, Illinois. He attended Indiana State University, where he played college football as a defensive back from 1980 to 1983. He earned his bachelor's degree in education at Indiana State in 1984.

== Charity work ==
Ramsey is an active member of the National Football League (NFL) minority internship program which helps new players get the extra help to excel in their positions. During his offseasons of being coach, Ramsey has helped teams, such as the Philadelphia Eagles, Chicago Bears, and the Green Bay Packers. In 2000, Ramsey helped ex-Washington Redskins and his organization "Winning Circle" which teaches character behavior to students in DeKalb County, Georgia.

== Head coaching record ==
Year	Team	Overall	Conference	Standing	Bowl/playoffs
Texas Southern Tigers (Southwestern Athletic Conference) (2011)
2011	Texas Southern	4–7	2–7	5th (West)	
Texas Southern:		4–7	2–7		
Clark Atlanta Panthers (Southern Intercollegiate Athletic Conference) (2015–2018)
2015	Clark Atlanta	1–8	1–3	4th (East)	
2016	Clark Atlanta	5–5	3–4	4th (East)	
2017	Clark Atlanta	4–6	2–4	T–4th (East)	
2018	Clark Atlanta	3–7	2–4	T–4th (East)	
Clark Atlanta:		13–26	8–15		
Total:		17–33			
