= Grambling State Tigers football =

American varsity football team

2026 Grambling State Tigers football team
- First season: 1928; 98 years ago
- Athletic director: Trayvean Scott
- Head coach: Mickey Joseph; 3rd season, 12–11 (.522)
- Location: Grambling, Louisiana
- Stadium: Eddie Robinson Stadium (capacity: 19,600)
- Conference: SWAC (since 1958)
- Division: West
- Colors: Black, gold, and red
- All-time record: 536–240–18 (.686)
- Bowl record: 19–8 (.704)

Black college national championships
- 1955, 1967, 1972, 1974, 1975, 1977, 1980, 1983, 1992, 2000, 2001, 2002, 2005, 2008, 2016

Conference championships
- MWAA: 1955 SWAC: 1960, 1965, 1966, 1967, 1968, 1971, 1972, 1973, 1974, 1975, 1977, 1978, 1979, 1980, 1983, 1985, 1989, 1994, 2000, 2001, 2002, 2005, 2008, 2011, 2016, 2017

Division championships
- SWAC West: 2000, 2001, 2002, 2003, 2005, 2007, 2008, 2010, 2011, 2015, 2016, 2017
- Rivalries: Jackson State; Prairie View A&M (rivalry); Southern (rivalry)
- Website: gsutigers.com

The Grambling State Tigers football team represents Grambling State University in Grambling, Louisiana. The Tigers play in NCAA Division I Football Championship Subdivision (FCS) as a member of the Southwestern Athletic Conference. They were known as Grambling Tigers until 1973, when the university changed its name from Grambling College to the current one.

The prominence of Grambling football is longstanding. The Tigers, under Hall of Fame coach Eddie Robinson, who guided them to 408 victories in 55 seasons from 1941 to 1942 and 1945 to 1997, were built as a small-school powerhouse with more than 200 players who played professional football.

On September 24, 1976, Grambling State and Morgan State became the first collegiate football teams from the United States to play a game in the continent of Asia. Grambling State defeated Morgan State 42–16 in Tokyo, Japan. In fall 1977, the Grambling State Tigers were invited back to Tokyo where they defeated the Temple Owls 35–32 in the inaugural Mirage Bowl game.

Among its accomplishments include: 15 Black college football national championships (tied for second most in HBCU history) and 27 Conference Championships (one Midwest Conference & 26 SWAC). The Tigers have won the most SWAC Championships to date.

== Football classifications ==
- 1956–1972: NCAA College Division (Small College)
- 1973–1976: NCAA Division II
- 1977: NCAA Division I
- 1978–present: NCAA Division I-AA (FCS)

== Conference affiliations ==
- 1928–1950: Independent
- 1951–1957: Midwest Athletic Association
- 1958–present: Southwestern Athletic Conference

== Annual classics ==
- State Fair Classic
- Red River State Fair Classic
- Bayou Classic

== Championships ==
=== Black college football national championship ===
Grambling State has won fifteen Black college football national championships.

Year	Coach	Overall record
1955	Eddie Robinson	10–0
1967	Eddie Robinson	9–1
1972	Eddie Robinson	11–2
1974	Eddie Robinson	11–1
1975	Eddie Robinson	10–2
1977	Eddie Robinson	10–1
1980	Eddie Robinson	10–2
1983	Eddie Robinson	8–1–2
1992	Eddie Robinson	10–2
2000	Doug Williams	10–2
2001	Doug Williams	10–1
2002	Doug Williams	11–2
2005	Melvin Spears	11–1
2008	Rod Broadway	11–2
2016	Broderick Fobbs	12–1

=== Conference championships ===
Grambling State has won 27 conference championships, 26 of them in the SWAC.

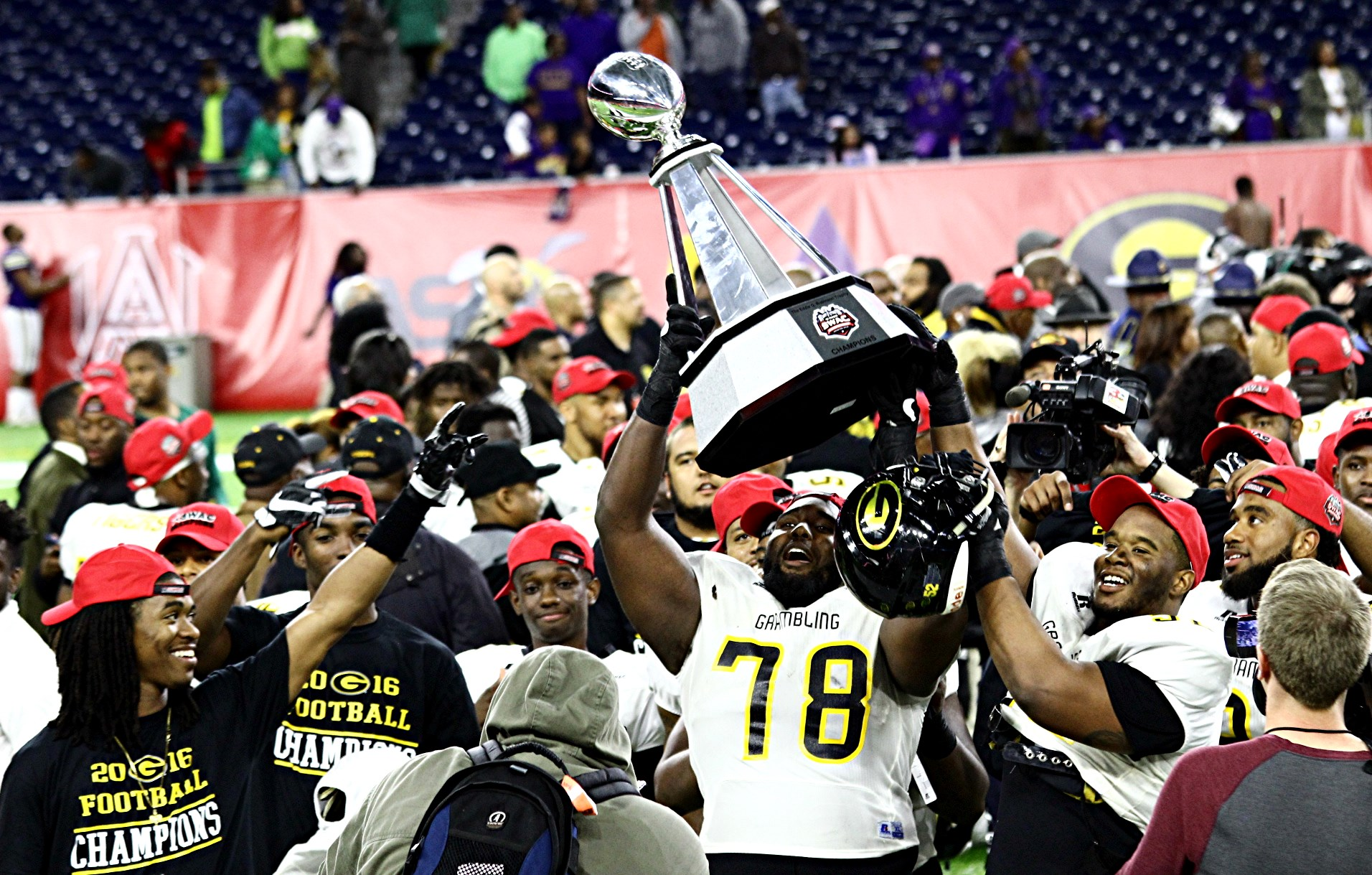
GSU's 2016 SWAC Championship celebration

Year	Conference	Coach	Overall record	Conference
1955	Midwestern Conference	Eddie Robinson	10–0	2–0
1960	Southwestern Athletic Conference*	Eddie Robinson	9–1	6–1
1965	Southwestern Athletic Conference	Eddie Robinson	8–3	6–1
1966	Southwestern Athletic Conference*	Eddie Robinson	6–2–1	5–1–1
1967	Southwestern Athletic Conference	Eddie Robinson	9–1	6–1
1968	Southwestern Athletic Conference*	Eddie Robinson	9–2	6–1
1971	Southwestern Athletic Conference	Eddie Robinson	9–2	5–1
1972	Southwestern Athletic Conference (vacated)	Eddie Robinson	11–2	5–1
1973	Southwestern Athletic Conference*	Eddie Robinson	10–3	5–1
1974	Southwestern Athletic Conference*	Eddie Robinson	11–1	5–1
1975	Southwestern Athletic Conference* (vacated)	Eddie Robinson	10–2	4–2
1977	Southwestern Athletic Conference	Eddie Robinson	10–1	6–0
1978	Southwestern Athletic Conference	Eddie Robinson	9–1–1	5–0–1
1979	Southwestern Athletic Conference*	Eddie Robinson	8–3	5–1
1980	Southwestern Athletic Conference*	Eddie Robinson	10–2	5–1
1983	Southwestern Athletic Conference	Eddie Robinson	10–2	6–0–1
1985	Southwestern Athletic Conference*	Eddie Robinson	9–3	6–1
1989	Southwestern Athletic Conference	Eddie Robinson	9–3	7–0
1994	Southwestern Athletic Conference*	Eddie Robinson	9–3	6–1
2000	Southwestern Athletic Conference	Doug Williams	10–2	6–1
2001	Southwestern Athletic Conference	Doug Williams	11–0	6–1
2002	Southwestern Athletic Conference	Doug Williams	11–2	6–1
2005	Southwestern Athletic Conference	Melvin Spears	11–1	9–0
2008	Southwestern Athletic Conference	Rod Broadway	11–2	7–0
2011	Southwestern Athletic Conference	Doug Williams	8–4	6–3
2016	Southwestern Athletic Conference	Broderick Fobbs	11–1	9–0
2017	Southwestern Athletic Conference	Broderick Fobbs	11–2	7–0

=== Division championships ===
Since the division of the Southwestern Athletic Conference into two divisions in 1999, Grambling State has been in the West Division. They have won ten division titles and reached the SWAC Football Championship Game each time.

Year	Coach	Conference CG Result
2000	Doug Williams	W 14–6 vs. Alabama A&M
2001	Doug Williams	W 38–31 vs. Alabama State
2002	Doug Williams	W 31–19 vs. Alabama A&M
2005	Melvin Spears	W 45–5 vs. Alabama A&M
2007	Rod Broadway	L 31–42 vs. Jackson State
2008	Rod Broadway	W 41–9 vs. Jackson State
2011	Doug Williams	W 16–15 vs. Alabama A&M
2015	Broderick Fobbs	L 21–49 vs. Alcorn State
2016	Broderick Fobbs	W 27–20 vs. Alcorn State
2017	Broderick Fobbs	W 40–32 vs. Alcorn State

== Postseason results ==
=== NCAA Division I-AA/FCS playoffs ===
The Tigers have appeared in the NCAA Division I-AA Football Championship playoffs three times with a record of 0–3.

Year	Round	Opponent	Result	Source
1980	Semifinals	Boise State	L 9–14	
1985	First Round	Arkansas State	L 7–10	
1989	First Round	Stephen F. Austin	L 56–59	

=== NCAA Division II playoffs ===
The Tigers have appeared in the NCAA Division II football championship playoffs one time with an overall record of 1–1.

Year	Round	Opponent	Result	Source
1973	Quarterfinals (Boardwalk Bowl); Semifinals (Grantland Rice Bowl)	Delaware; Western Kentucky	W 17–8; L 20–28	

== College Football Hall of Fame members ==
- Buck Buchanan - OT, 1959–1962, inducted 1996
- Gary "Big Hands" Johnson - DT, 1971–1974, inducted 1997
- Eddie Robinson - Coach, 1941–1997, inducted 1997 (third most victories in college football history)
- Doug Williams - QB, 1974–1977, inducted 2001
- Paul "Tank" Younger - FB, 1945–1948, inducted 2000

== Pro Football Hall of Fame members ==
Over 100 Grambling State alumni have played in the NFL, including four Pro Football Hall of Famers:

- Willie Brown, inducted 1984
- Buck Buchanan, inducted 1990
- Willie Davis, inducted 1981
- Charlie Joiner, inducted 1996

== Notable former players ==
- Garland Boyette
- Arlester Brown
- Jamie Caleb
- Henry Davis
- Walter Dean
- Steve Dennis
- Alphonse Dotson
- Broderick Fobbs
- James Harris
- Richard Harris
- Jason Hatcher
- James Hunter
- Randy Hymes
- Stone Johnson
- Ernie Ladd
- Albert Lewis
- Frank Lewis
- Clifton McNeil
- Billy Newsome
- Elfrid Payton (Canadian Football Hall of Fame inductee)
- Jake Reed
- Vern Roberson
- Roosevelt Taylor
- Bennie Thompson
- Everson Walls
- Sammy White
- Doug Williams
- Willie Williams
- Willie Young

== Future non-conference opponents ==
Announced schedules as of February 3, 2026.

2026
Clark Atlanta
Central State
at TCU

== See also ==
- Grambling State Tigers
- List of NCAA Division I FCS football programs
