= 2011 Grambling State Tigers football team =

American college football season

2011 Grambling State Tigers football

SWAC champion SWAC West Division champion

SWAC Football Championship Game, W 16–15 vs. Alabama A&M
- Conference: Southwestern Athletic Conference
- West Division
- Record: 8–4 (6–3 SWAC)
- Head coach: Doug Williams (7th season)
- Offensive coordinator: Vyron Brown (1st season)
- Offensive scheme: Pro-style
- Defensive coordinator: Cliff Yoshida (5th season)
- Base defense: 3–4
- Home stadium: Eddie Robinson Stadium

2011 Southwestern Athletic Conference football standings
	Conf.			Overall
Team	W		L	W		L
East Division
No. 21 Jackson State x	7	–	2	9	–	2
Alabama State x	7	–	2	8	–	3
Alabama A&M xy	7	–	2	8	–	4
Alcorn State	1	–	8	2	–	8
Mississippi Valley State	1	–	8	1	–	10
West Division
Grambling State xy$	6	–	3	8	–	4
Arkansas–Pine Bluff	5	–	4	6	–	5
Prairie View A&M	5	–	4	5	–	6
Southern	4	–	5	4	–	7
Texas Southern	2	–	7	4	–	7
Championship: Grambling State 16, Alabama A&M 15
$ – Conference champion; x – Division champion/co-champions; y – Championship game participant; Jackson State and Southern were ineligible to participate in the SWAC Championship Game due to low APR scores.; Rankings from The Sports Network Poll

The 2011 Grambling State Tigers football team represented Grambling State University as a member of the West Division of the Southwestern Athletic Conference (SWAC) during the 2011 NCAA Division I FCS football season. The Tigers were led Doug Williams in the first season of his second stints as head coach and seventh overall after coaching the Tigers from 1998 to 2003. The Tigers finished the season 8–4 overall and 6–3 in SWAC play to win the West Division and defeated Alabama A&M in the SWAC Football Championship Game, 16–15, to become SWAC champions. The team played home games at Eddie Robinson Stadium in Grambling, Louisiana.

== Schedule ==
Date	Time	Opponent	Site	TV	Result	Attendance	Source
September 3	6:00 pm	vs. Alcorn State	Independence Stadium; Shreveport, LA (Port City Classic)		W 21–14	4,204	
September 10	6:00 pm	at Louisiana–Monroe*	Malone Stadium; Monroe, LA		L 7–35	26,532	
September 17	7:00 pm	at Alabama State	Cramton Bowl; Montgomery, AL		L 17–31	11,563	
September 24	5:00 pm	Alabama A&M	Eddie Robinson Stadium; Grambling, LA		L 14–20	7,118	
October 1	6:00 pm	vs. Prairie View A&M	Cotton Bowl; Dallas, TX (State Fair Classic)		L 23–31	37,311	
October 15	4:00 pm	Concordia College (AL)*	Eddie Robinson Stadium; Grambling, LA		W 44–0	7,192	
October 22	2:00 pm	Mississippi Valley State^{†}	Eddie Robinson Stadium; Grambling, LA		W 30–24	11,137	
October 29	1:00 pm	at Arkansas–Pine Bluff	Golden Lion Stadium; Pine Bluff, AR		W 27–20	9,202	
November 5	2:00 pm	at Jackson State	Mississippi Veterans Memorial Stadium; Jackson, MS		W 26–23	21,576	
November 12	7:00 pm	Texas Southern	Eddie Robinson Stadium; Grambling, LA		W 29–25	7,142	
November 26	1:00 pm	vs. Southern	Mercedes-Benz Superdome; New Orleans, LA (Bayou Classic)	NBC	W 36–12	40,715	
December 10	1:00 pm	vs. Alabama A&M	Legion Field; Birmingham, AL (SWAC Football Championship Game)	ESPNU	W 16–15	23,476	
*Non-conference game; ^{†}Homecoming; All times are in Central time
