= Roman Banks =

American basketball player, coach, and athletic director

Current position
- Title: Athletic director
- Team: Southern
- Conference: SWAC

Playing career
- 1988–1992: Northwestern State
- Position: Guard

Coaching career (HC unless noted)
- 1993–1994: Green Oaks HS
- 1994–1996: Southern–Shreveport (asst.)
- 1996–2002: Southern (asst.)
- 2003–2006: Southeastern Louisiana (asst.)
- 2006–2011: Southeastern Louisiana (assoc. HC)
- 2011–2017: Southern

Administrative career (AD unless noted)
- 2017–present: Southern

Head coaching record
- Overall: 114–85 (.573)
- Tournaments: (NCAA): 0–2

Accomplishments and honors

Championships
- 2x SWAC tournament (2013, 2016); SWAC regular season (2014)

Awards
- 2x SWAC Coach of the Year (2013, 2014)

Roman Patrick Banks is an American former basketball coach and the current athletic director at Southern University. Banks previously served as the head men's basketball coach for the Southern Jaguars before he was promoted to AD on March 31, 2017.

== Head coaching record ==
Record table
Season	Team	Overall	Conference	Standing	Postseason
Southern Jaguars (SWAC) (2011–2017)
2011–12	Southern	17–14	13–5	2nd	
2012–13	Southern	23–10	15–3	2nd	NCAA Division I Round of 64
2013–14	Southern	19–13	15–3	1st	
2014–15	Southern	18–17	13–5	3rd	
2015–16	Southern	22–13	11–7	4th	NCAA Division I First Four
2016–17	Southern	15–18	10–8	T–3rd	
Southern:		114–85 (.573)	77–31 (.713)		
Total:		114–85 (.573)			
National champion Postseason invitational champion Conference regular season champion Conference regular season and conference tournament champion Division regular season champion Division regular season and conference tournament champion Conference tournament champion
