= Southern Jaguars and Lady Jaguars =

- University: Southern University
- Conference: SWAC
- NCAA: Division I (FCS)
- Athletic director: Roman Banks
- Location: Baton Rouge, Louisiana
- Football stadium: A. W. Mumford Stadium
- Basketball arena: F. G. Clark Center
- Baseball stadium: Lee–Hines Field
- Softball stadium: Lady Jaguar Field
- Soccer stadium: Jaguar Park
- Other venues: Clifford Seymour Gymnasium; SU Tennis Courts; West Feliciana Sports Park
- Mascot: LaCumba
- Nickname: Jaguars and Lady Jaguars
- Colors: Columbia blue and gold
- Website: gojagsports.com
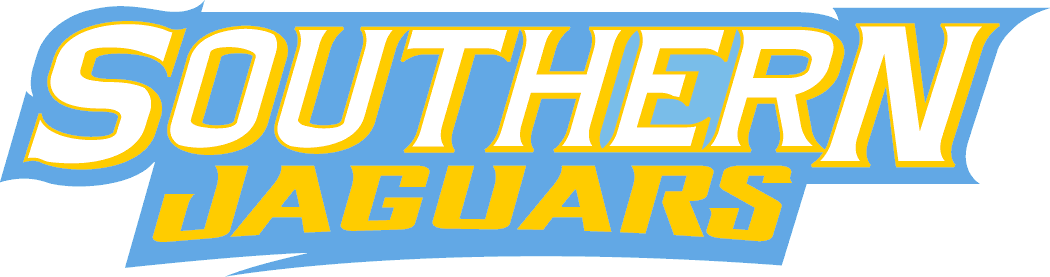

The Southern Jaguars and Lady Jaguars represent Southern University in NCAA intercollegiate athletics. Southern University's 13 athletic teams participate in the Southwestern Athletic Conference (SWAC) which is a part of the NCAA Division I. Football participates in the Football Championship Subdivision (formerly Division I-AA).

== Sports sponsored ==
Men's sports	Women's sports
Baseball	Basketball
Basketball	Bowling
Cross country	Cross country
Football	Golf
Golf	Soccer
Tennis	Softball
Track and field^{†}	Tennis
	Track and field^{†}
	Volleyball
† – Track and field includes both indoor and outdoor.

=== Baseball ===
The university's baseball team has won more regular season championships than any other SWAC member. They play their home games at Lee-Hines Field.

==== Notable players ====
- Rickie Weeks was the first college player selected in the 2003 Major League Baseball Draft when the Milwaukee Brewers made him their No. 1 pick, the highest a second baseman has ever been drafted in MLB Draft history. Weeks won the Golden Spikes Award, Dick Howser Trophy, and Baseball America College Player of the Year honors as the nation's top collegiate player during the 2003 season.
- Hall of Famer Lou Brock played baseball at Southern University from 1958 to 1960.

=== Men's basketball ===
==== GSU basketball rivalry ====
The basketball game against in-state rival Grambling State Tigers at the F.G. Clark Activity Center is annually the highest attended and one of the most anticipated games of the season.

==== TSU basketball rivalry ====
Since 2008, Southern and Texas Southern have traditionally been the favorites to compete for the SWAC Championship every season. The games have become very competitive and highly anticipated by both universities.

==== Notable players ====
Avery Johnson, former NBA star who won an NBA title with the San Antonio Spurs, is a 1988 graduate of Southern. Johnson was named NBA Coach of the Year in 2006 after leading the Dallas Mavericks to the NBA Finals. Bob Love, known as "Butterbean" while at Southern, is the second leading scorer in Chicago Bulls history behind Michael Jordan. Love starred at Southern University between 1962 and 1965.

=== Women's basketball ===
The 2005–2006 women's basketball team won a share of the SWAC regular season title and won the SWAC women's basketball tournament. This was Coach Sandy Pugh's third appearance in the NCAA tournament with the university.

=== Football ===
==== Bayou Classic ====
Every Thanksgiving weekend, Southern plays in-state archrival Grambling State University in the Bayou Classic at the Mercedes-Benz Superdome in New Orleans. The game is a national primetime telecast on NBC. Due to Hurricane Katrina, the 2005 game was moved to Reliant Stadium in Houston, Texas.

==== Homecoming ====
The homecoming football game is always a sold-out game of 25,000+ against a SWAC opponent. The football game is annually the last major event of homecoming week.

==== Jackson State Rivalry ====
The Southern Jaguars maintains a very popular and heated football rivalry with SWAC East foe Jackson State University. The Jackson State–Southern University rivalry game is one of the highest attended and most anticipated games for both schools every year.

==== Notable players ====
Mel Blount played running back and cornerback for Southern from 1967 to 1969, before enjoying a 14-year career as a cornerback for the Pittsburgh Steelers. A member of the Steel Curtain defense, he helped the franchise win four Super Bowl championships in six years. Blount was inducted into the Pro Football Hall of Fame in 1989.

Aeneas Demetrius Williams (/əˈniːəs/), a native of New Orleans, attended Southern University for academics and did not play football until his Junior year as a walk-on. After earning a starting position as a cornerback, Williams was drafted in the third round (59th overall) of the 1991 NFL Draft.[1] He played with the Arizona Cardinals and St. Louis Rams as a cornerback, then switched to free safety later in his career. He was inducted into the Pro Football Hall of Fame in 2014.

Harold Carmichael attended Southern University as a three-sport athlete. He used his 6'8" height to play on the basketball team as a center, and threw the javelin and discus for the track and field team. In football, he shifted to playing wide receiver, where his performance was so outstanding he was inducted into the SWAC Hall of Fame in 2012.[2] He was drafted by the Eagles in the 7th round of the 1971 NFL Draft.[3]

=== Women's Soccer ===
The Southern Lady Jaguars soccer team competes in the Southwestern Athletic Conference, which is part of the National Collegiate Athletic Association's Division I. The team plays its home games at Jaguar Park.

=== Softball ===
The Southern Lady Jaguars softball team competes in the Southwestern Athletic Conference, which is part of the National Collegiate Athletic Association's Division I. The team plays its home games at Lady Jaguar Field.

== National championships ==
=== Team ===
Sport	Association	Division	Year	Opponent/runner-up	Score
Men's indoor track and field (2)	NAIA	Single	1966	Fort Hays State	87–72 (+15)
Men's indoor track and field (2)	NAIA	Single	1967	Texas Southern	102–92 (+10)
Men's outdoor track and field (3)	NAIA	Single	1965	North Carolina College	77–40 (+37)
Men's outdoor track and field (3)	NAIA	Single	1966	Texas Southern	92–69 (+23)
Men's outdoor track and field (3)	NAIA	Single	1967	Texas Southern	77–63 (+14)

== Traditions ==
Southern University's colors are Columbia blue and gold and their fanbase is traditionally referred to as the "Jaguar Nation."

== See also ==
- List of NCAA Division I institutions
- List of black college football classics
