= Eddie G. Robinson Memorial Stadium =

Multi-purpose stadium

Coordinates: 32.520925°N 92.721289°W

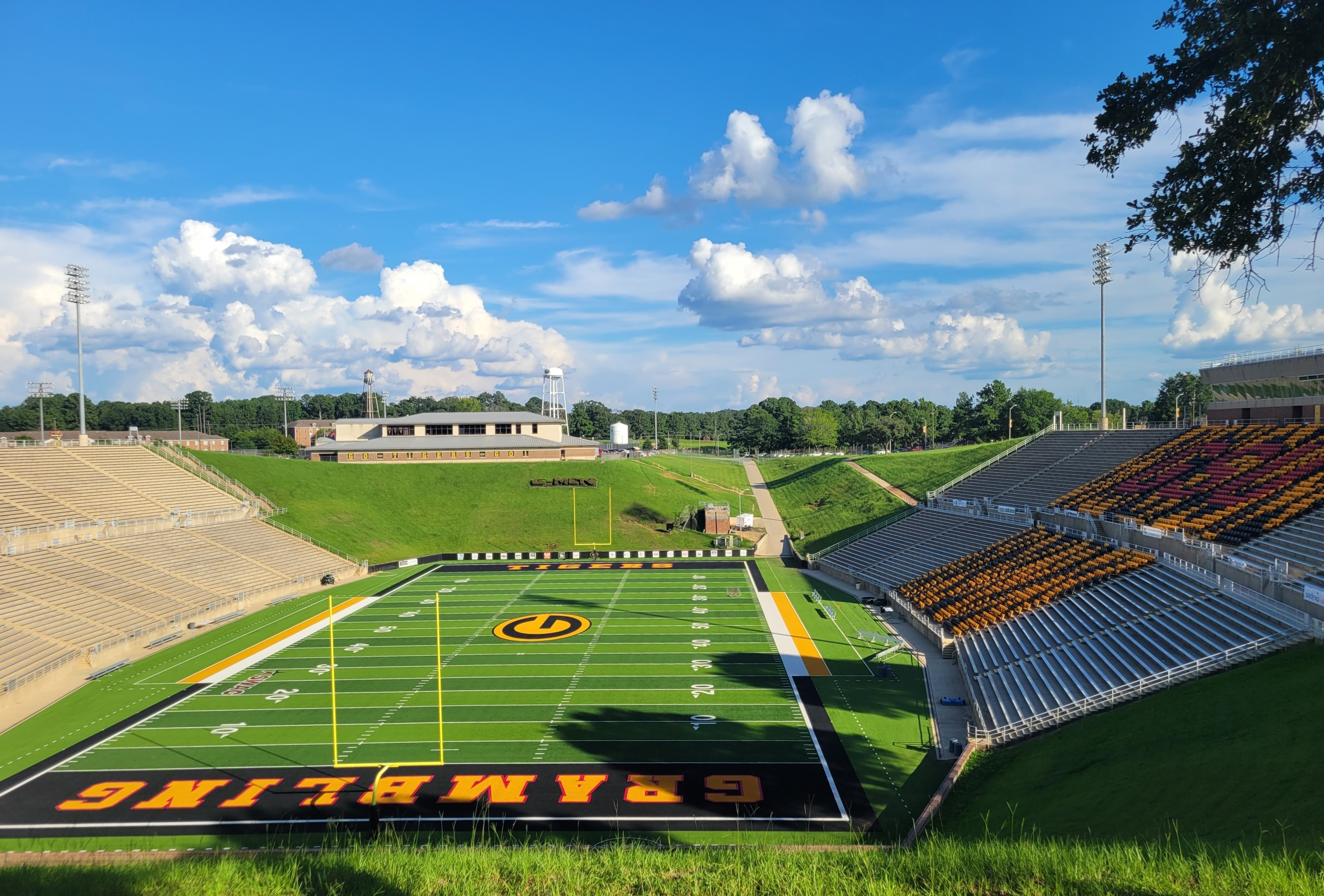
- Interactive map of Eddie G. Robinson Memorial Stadium
- Full name: Eddie G. Robinson Memorial Stadium
- Location: Grambling, Louisiana
- Owner: Grambling State University
- Operator: Grambling State University
- Capacity: 19,600
- Surface: Hellas Matrix Turf

Construction
- Opened: September 3, 1983

Tenant
- Grambling State Tigers (NCAA) (1983–present)

Eddie G. Robinson Memorial Stadium is a 19,600-seat multi-purpose stadium in Grambling, Louisiana. It opened in 1983 and is home to the Grambling State Tigers football team and Grambling High School Kittens football team. The stadium is named in honor of famous Grambling State University head football coach, Eddie Robinson. It replaced Grambling Stadium. The stadium is oftentimes affectionately referred to as "The Hole" due to the topography of the stadium area.

In 2017, approximately $2 million worth of stadium upgrades were completed. Included in the upgrades were installing new artificial turf, a new larger scoreboard, additional parking and additional tailgating areas.

== Gallery ==
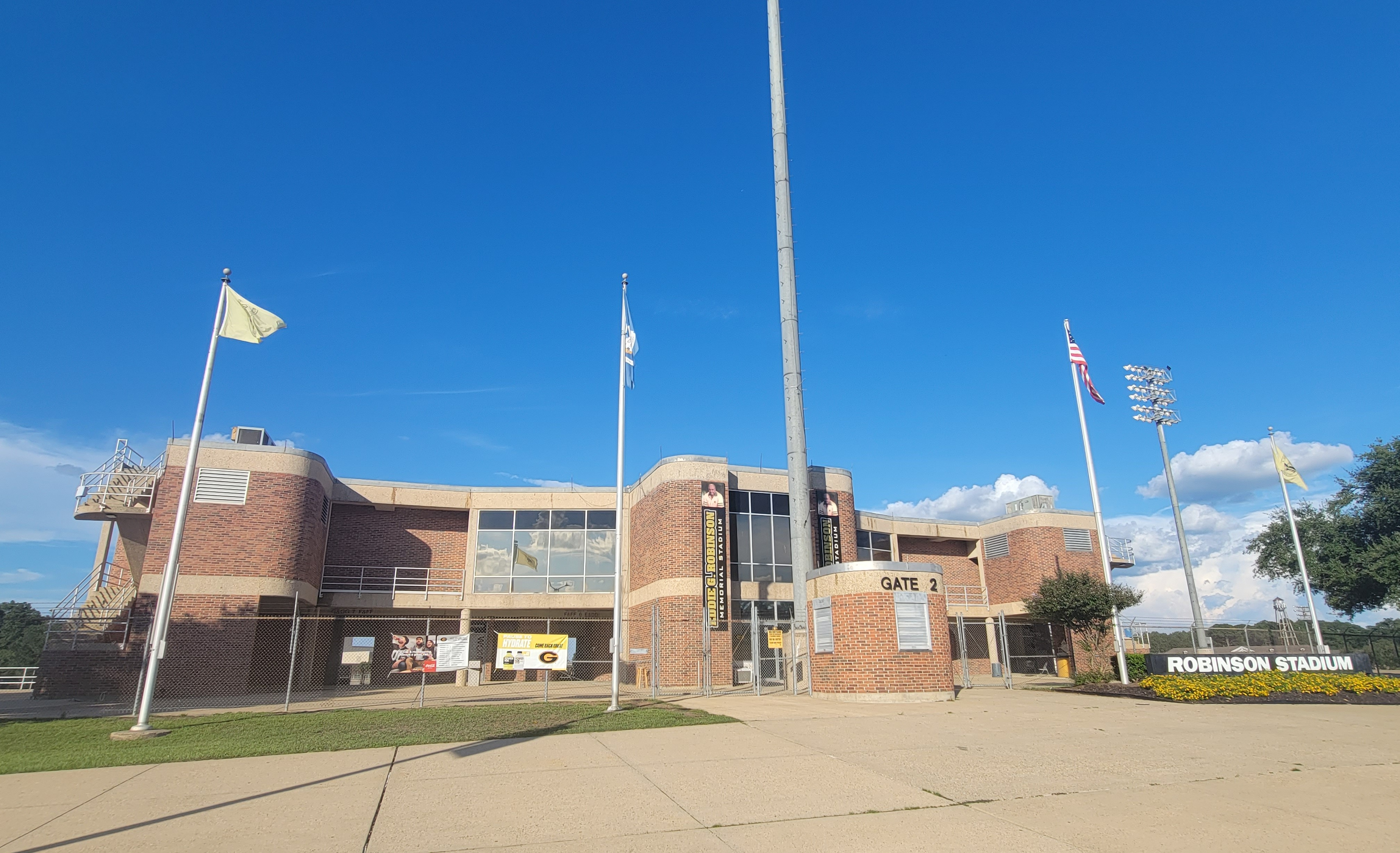
Eddie Robinson Stadium-exterior

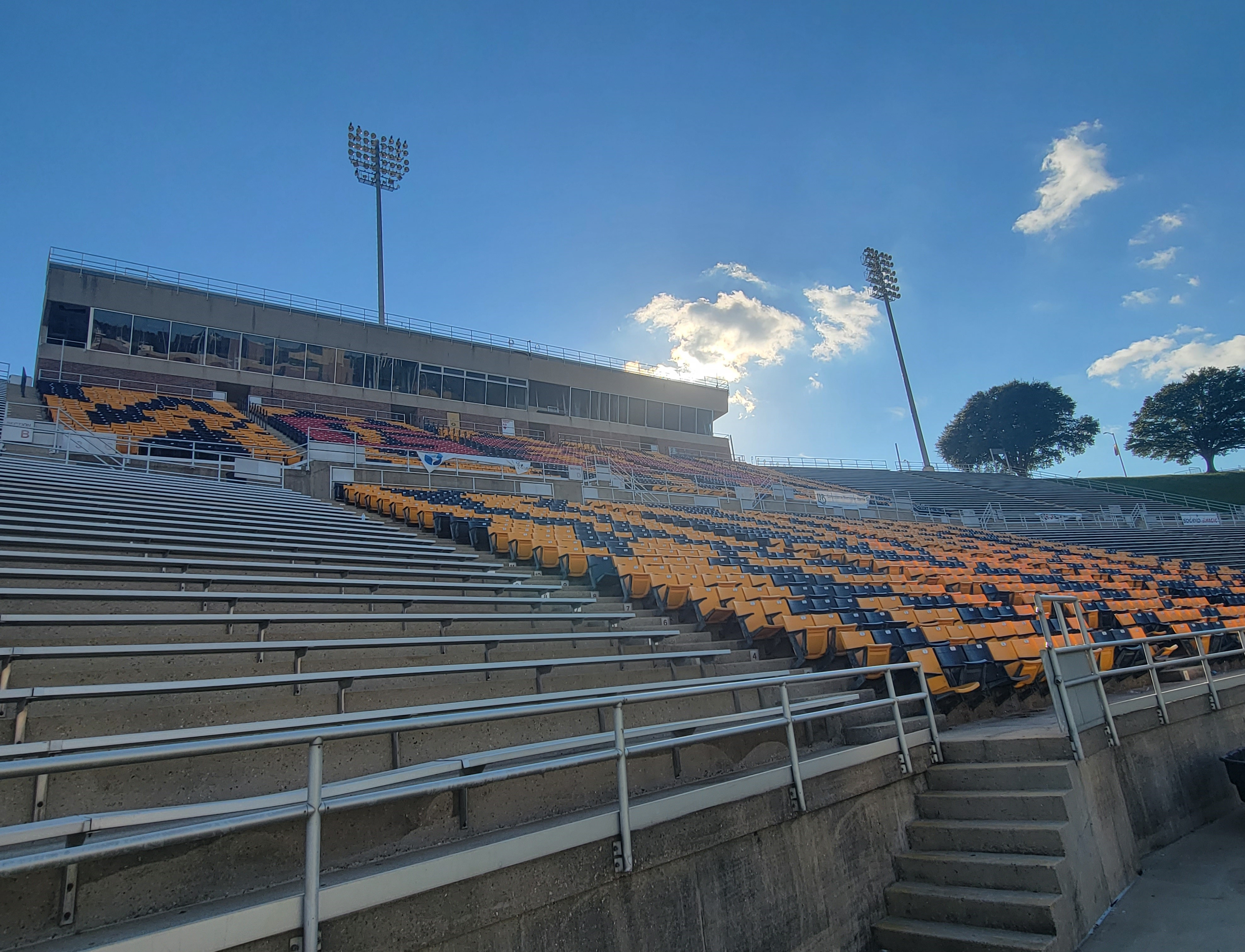
Eddie Robinson Stadium-home stands and press box

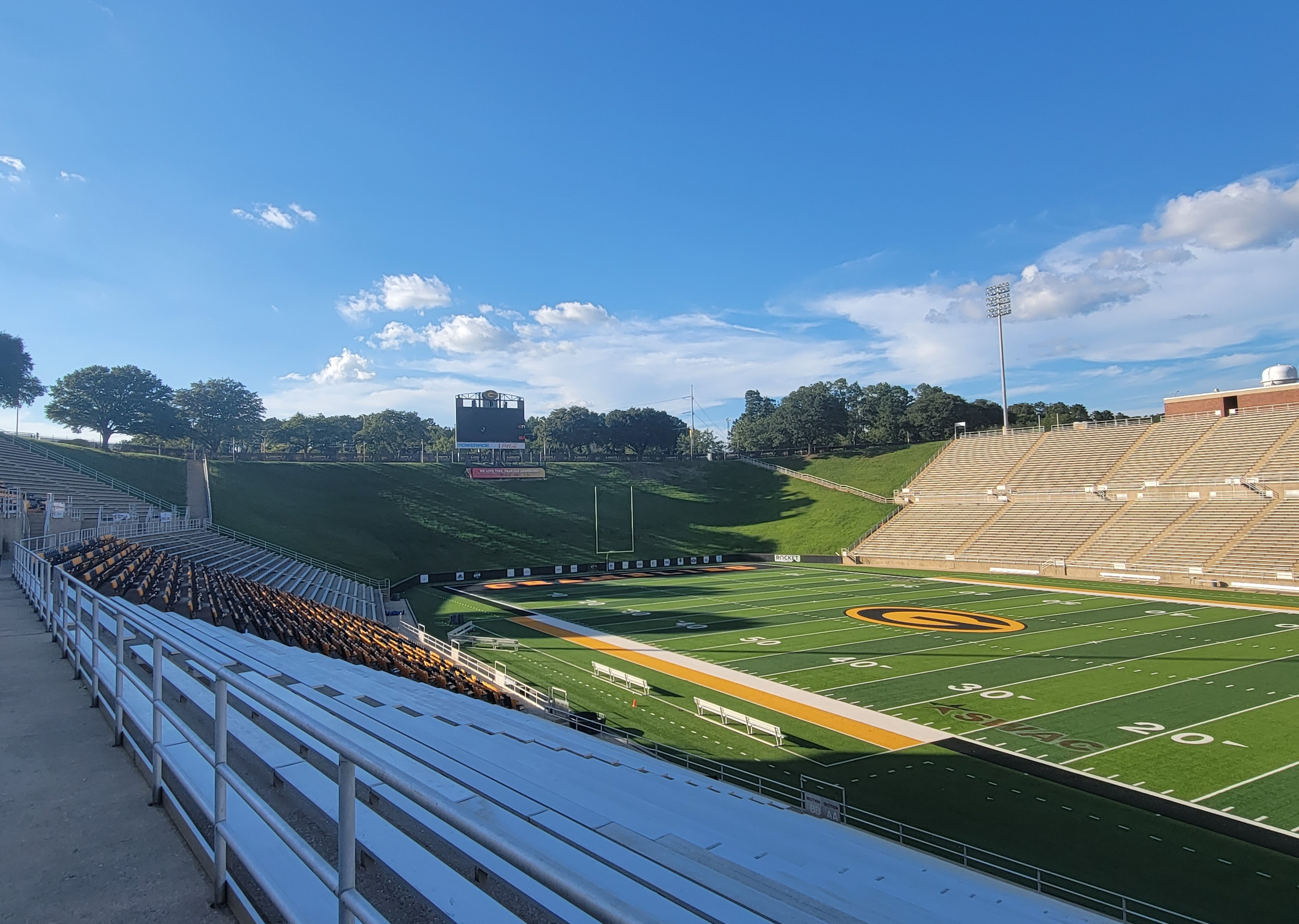
Eddie Robinson Stadium-inner bowl

== See also ==
- List of NCAA Division I FCS football stadiums
