= Southwestern Athletic Conference =

Collegiate athletic conference made up of historically black colleges and universities

- Association: NCAA
- Founded: 1920; 106 years ago
- Commissioner: Charles McClelland
- Sports fielded: 18; men's: 8; women's: 10
- Division: Division I
- Subdivision: FCS
- No. of teams: 12
- Headquarters: Birmingham, Alabama
- Region: Southern
- Broadcasters: ESPN TheGrio SWAC TV
- Website: swac.org

Locations
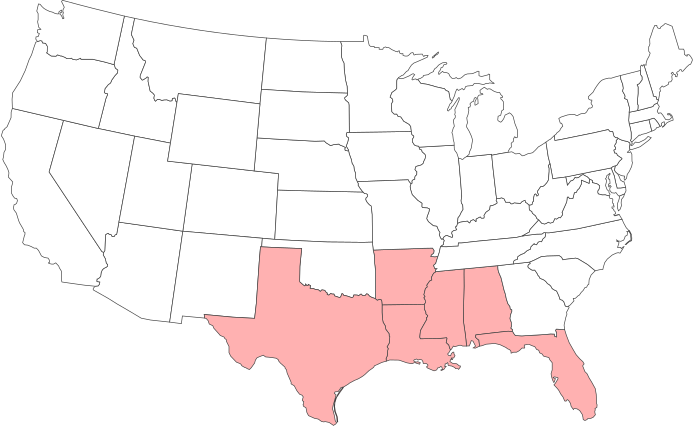

The Southwestern Athletic Conference (SWAC) is a collegiate athletic conference headquartered in Birmingham, Alabama, which is made up of historically black colleges and universities (HBCUs) in the Southern United States. It participates in the NCAA's Division I for most sports; in football, it participates in the Football Championship Subdivision (FCS), formerly referred to as Division I-AA.

The SWAC is considered the premier HBCU conference and ranks among the elite in the nation in terms of alumni affiliated with professional sports teams, particularly in football. On the gridiron, the conference has been the biggest draw on the Football Championship Subdivision (FCS) level of the NCAA, leading the nation in average home attendance every year except one since FCS has been in existence. In 1994, the SWAC fell just 40,000 fans short of becoming the first non-Football Bowl Subdivision conference to attract one million fans to its home games.

== History ==
Location of SWAC members
Location of SWAC members: East Division, West Division

In 1920, athletic officials from six Texas HBCUs—C. H. Fuller of Bishop College, Red Randolph and C. H. Patterson of Paul Quinn College, E. G. Evans, H. J. Evans and H. J. Starns of Prairie View A&M, D. C. Fuller of Texas College and G. Whitte Jordan of Wiley College, now Wiley University—met in Houston to discuss common interests. At this meeting, they agreed to form a new league, the SWAC.

Paul Quinn became the first of the original members to withdraw from the league in 1929. When Langston University of Oklahoma was admitted into the conference two years later, it began the migration of state-supported institutions into the SWAC. Southern University entered the ranks in 1934, followed by Arkansas AM&N (now the University of Arkansas at Pine Bluff) in 1936 and Texas Southern University in 1954.

Rapid growth in enrollment of the state-supported schools made it difficult for the church-supported schools to finance their athletics programs and one by one they fell victim to the growing prowess of the state-supported colleges. Huston–Tillotson (formerly Samuel Huston) withdrew from the conference in 1954, Bishop in 1956, and Langston in 1957—one year before the admittance of two more state-supported schools: Grambling College and Jackson State College. The enter-exit cycle continued in 1962 when Texas College withdrew, followed by the admittance of Alcorn A&M (now Alcorn State University) that same year. Wiley left in 1968, the same year Mississippi Valley State College entered. Arkansas AM&N exited in 1970 and Alabama State University entered in 1982. Arkansas–Pine Bluff (formerly Arkansas AM&N) rejoined the SWAC on July 1, 1997, regaining full-member status one year later. Alabama A&M University became the conference's tenth member when it became a full member in September 1999 after a one-year period as an affiliate SWAC member. Most of the former SWAC members that have left the conference are currently a part of the HBCU Athletic Conference of the NAIA.

On 3 September 2020, the SWAC had announced that there would be a division realignment with the additions of Florida A&M University and Bethune-Cookman University beginning with the 2021–22 academic year; which both would compete in the SWAC East, while Alcorn State would be moving to the SWAC West.

=== Chronological timeline ===
- 1920 — The Southwestern Athletic Conference (SWAC) was founded. Charter members included Bishop College, Paul Quinn College, Prairie View State Normal & Industrial College (now Prairie View A&M University), Samuel Huston College (now part of Huston–Tillotson University), Texas College and Wiley University, beginning the 1920–21 academic year.
- 1929 – Paul Quinn left the SWAC after the 1928–29 academic year.
- 1932 – Oklahoma Colored Agricultural and Normal University (now Langston University) joined the SWAC in the 1932–33 academic year.
- 1935 – Southern University joined the SWAC in the 1935–36 academic year.
- 1936 – Arkansas Agricultural, Mechanical & Normal College (now the University of Arkansas at Pine Bluff) joined the SWAC in the 1936–37 academic year.
- 1954:
  - Huston–Tillotson left the SWAC after the 1953–54 academic year.
  - Texas Southern University joined the SWAC in the 1954–55 academic year.
- 1956 – Bishop left the SWAC after the 1955–56 academic year.
- 1957 – Langston left the SWAC after the 1956–57 academic year.
- 1958 – Grambling College (now Grambling State University) and Jackson College for Negro Teachers (now Jackson State University) joined the SWAC in the 1958–59 academic year.
- 1962 – Texas College left the SWAC after the 1961–62 academic year.
- 1962 – Alcorn Agricultural and Mechanical College (now Alcorn State University) joined the SWAC in the 1962–63 academic year.
- 1968 – Wiley left the SWAC after the 1967–68 academic year.
- 1968 – Mississippi Valley State College (now Mississippi Valley State University) joined the SWAC in the 1968–69 academic year.
- 1970 – Arkansas–Pine Bluff (UAPB) left the SWAC after the 1969–70 academic year.
- 1973 – Andrew "Wiggie" Brown became the first full-time Commissioner; SWAC headquartered in New Orleans, Louisiana at the 1 Shell Square building; in the 1973–74 academic year.
- 1982 – Alabama State University joined the SWAC in the 1982–83 academic year.
- 1997 – Arkansas–Pine Bluff (UAPB) rejoined the SWAC as an affiliate member in the 1997–98 academic year.
- 1998 – Arkansas–Pine Bluff (UAPB) upgrades to be a full member of the SWAC in the 1998–99 academic year.
- 1999 – Alabama Agricultural and Mechanical University (Alabama A&M) joined the SWAC in the 1999–2000 academic year.
- 2021 – Bethune–Cookman University and Florida Agricultural and Mechanical University (Florida A&M) joined the SWAC in the 2021–22 academic year.

== Competitions ==
The SWAC is one of two FCS conferences – the others being the Mid-Eastern Athletic Conference – whose conference champion does not participate in the FCS playoffs, opting instead to play in the Celebration Bowl against the champion of the MEAC. However, SWAC teams can still be invited via an at-large invitation, as was the case in 2021 when SWAC member Florida A&M University was invited over SWAC conference football champion Jackson State, who was obligated via contract to play in the 2021 Celebration Bowl. The SWAC instead splits its schools into two divisions, and plays a conference championship game. Three of the SWAC's teams, Alabama State in the Turkey Day Classic and Grambling and Southern in the Bayou Classic, play their last games of the regular season on Thanksgiving weekend, preventing the SWAC Championship from being decided until the first weekend of December, long after the tournament is underway.

Current championship competition offered by the SWAC includes competition for men in baseball, basketball, cross country, football, golf, indoor track, outdoor track & field and tennis. Women's competition is offered in the sports of basketball, bowling, cross country, golf, indoor track, outdoor track & field, soccer, softball, tennis and volleyball.

== Member schools ==
=== Current full members ===
The SWAC currently has 12 full members, all but one are public schools:

Institution	Location	Founded	Affiliation	Enrollment	Nickname	Joined (Note: Represents the calendar year when fall sports competition begins.)	Colors
Alabama A&M University	Huntsville, Alabama	1875	Public	6,172	Bulldogs & Lady Bulldogs	1999	
Alabama State University	Montgomery, Alabama	1867	Public	4,190	Hornets & Lady Hornets	1982	
Alcorn State University	Lorman, Mississippi (Note: Alcorn State has a Lorman mailing address, but is located in an unincorporated area of Claiborne County that is designated by the U.S. Census Bureau as Alcorn State, Mississippi.)	1871	Public	3,523	Braves & Lady Braves	1962	
University of Arkansas at Pine Bluff (UAPB)	Pine Bluff, Arkansas	1873	Public	2,498	Golden Lions & Golden Lady Lions	1936	
University of Arkansas at Pine Bluff (UAPB)	Pine Bluff, Arkansas	1873	Public	2,498	Golden Lions & Golden Lady Lions	1997 (Note: Arkansas–Pine Bluff (UAPB) left the SWAC after the 1969–70 school year as Arkansas AM&N; before rejoining in 1997–98 as an affiliate, and to gain full member status the following season (1998–99).)	
Bethune–Cookman University	Daytona Beach, Florida	1904	United; Methodist	2,901	Wildcats	2021	
Florida A&M University	Tallahassee, Florida	1887	Public	9,626	Rattlers & Lady Rattlers	2021	
Grambling State University	Grambling, Louisiana	1901	Public	5,438	Tigers & Lady Tigers	1958	
Jackson State University	Jackson, Mississippi	1877	Public	7,080	Tigers & Lady Tigers	1958	
Mississippi Valley State University	Itta Bena, Mississippi (Note: Mississippi Valley State (MVSU) has an Itta Bena mailing address, but is located in unincorporated Leflore County and is designated by the U.S. Census Bureau as Mississippi Valley State, Mississippi.)	1950	Public	2,147	Delta Devils & Devilettes	1968	
Prairie View A&M University	Prairie View, Texas	1876	Public	9,893	Panthers & Lady Panthers	1920	
Southern University	Baton Rouge, Louisiana	1880	Public	7,140	Jaguars & Lady Jaguars	1935	
Texas Southern University	Houston, Texas	1947	Public	7,524	Tigers & Lady Tigers	1954	

=== Former members ===
The SWAC had six former full members, all but one were private schools:

Institution	Location	Founded	Affiliation (Note: Note: All core member institutions were Historically black colleges and universities (HBCU's).)	Enrollment	Nickname	Joined (Note: Represents the calendar year when fall sports competition begins.)	Left (Note: Represents the calendar year when spring sports competition ends.)	Current conference
Bishop College	Marshall, Texas (Note: Bishop was originally at Marshall, Texas, during its tenure with the SWAC until 1961, when the college was moved to Dallas, Texas, until the school's closing in 1988)	1881	Baptist HMS	N/A	Tigers	1920	1956	N/A (Note: Bishop was closed in 1988. Upon its closure, Paul Quinn College relocated from Waco to Dallas and re-established itself at the Bishop College campus.)
Huston–Tillotson University (Note: Formerly known as Samuel Huston College until its merger with Tillotson College on October 24, 1952.)	Austin, Texas	1881	Methodist, Church of Christ	900	Rams	1920	1954	HBCU (HBCUAC) (Note: Currently an NAIA athletic conference.)
Langston University	Langston, Oklahoma	1897	Public	3,922	Lions	1931	1957	Sooner (SAC)
Paul Quinn College	Dallas, Texas	1872	A.M.E. Church	1,020	Tigers	1920	1929	HBCU (HBCUAC)
Texas College	Tyler, Texas	1894	C.M.E. Church	600	Steers	1920	1962	Red River (RRAC)
Wiley University (Note: Formerly known as Wiley College from 1929 to November 3, 2023.)	Marshall, Texas	1873	United Methodist	1,200	Wildcats	1920	1968	HBCU (HBCUAC)

=== Divisional realignment ===
Alcorn State moved to the West Division with the additions of both Bethune–Cookman and Florida A&M in 2021.

East Division	West Division
Alabama A&M	Alcorn State
Alabama State	Arkansas–Pine Bluff
Bethune–Cookman	Grambling State
Florida A&M	Prairie View A&M
Jackson State	Southern
Mississippi Valley State	Texas Southern

=== Membership timeline ===
Full member (all sports) Full member (non-football) Associate member (football) Associate member (sport) Other Conference Other Conference

== Sports ==
The SWAC sponsors championship competitions in eight men's and ten women's NCAA sanctioned sports:

Teams in Southwestern Athletic Conference competition
Sport	Men's	Women's
Baseball	12	–
Basketball	12	12
Bowling	–	9
Cross country	11	12
Football	12	–
Golf	7	4
Soccer	–	10
Softball	–	12
Tennis	8	11
Track and Field (Indoor)	12	12
Track and Field (Outdoor)	12	12
Volleyball	–	12

=== Men's sponsored sports by school ===
School	Baseball	Basketball	Cross Country	Football	Golf	Tennis	Track & Field (Indoor)	Track & Field (Outdoor)	Total SWAC Sports
Alabama A&M	Yes	Yes	Yes	Yes	Yes	Yes	Yes	Yes	8
Alabama State	Yes	Yes	Yes	Yes	Yes	Yes	Yes	Yes	8
Alcorn State	Yes	Yes	Yes	Yes	No	Yes	Yes	Yes	7
Arkansas-Pine Bluff	Yes	Yes	Yes	Yes	Yes	No	Yes	Yes	7
Bethune-Cookman	Yes	Yes	Yes	Yes	No	No	Yes	Yes	6
Florida A&M	Yes	Yes	No	Yes	Yes	No	Yes	Yes	6
Grambling State	Yes	Yes	Yes	Yes	No	No	Yes	Yes	6
Jackson State	Yes	Yes	Yes	Yes	Yes	Yes	Yes	Yes	8
Mississippi Valley	Yes	Yes	Yes	Yes	No	Yes	Yes	Yes	7
Prairie View	Yes	Yes	Yes	Yes	Yes	No	Yes	Yes	7
Southern	Yes	Yes	Yes	Yes	Yes	Yes	Yes	Yes	8
Texas Southern	Yes	Yes	Yes	Yes	Yes	No	Yes	Yes	7
Totals	12	12	11	12	8	6	12	12	85

=== Women's sponsored sports by school ===
School	Basketball	Bowling	Cross Country	Golf	Soccer	Softball	Tennis	Track & Field (Indoor)	Track & Field (Outdoor)	Volleyball	Total SWAC Sports
Alabama A&M	Yes	Yes	Yes	No	Yes	Yes	Yes	Yes	Yes	Yes	9
Alabama State	Yes	Yes	Yes	Yes	Yes	Yes	Yes	Yes	Yes	Yes	10
Alcorn State	Yes	No	Yes	No	Yes	Yes	Yes	Yes	Yes	Yes	8
Arkansas-Pine Bluff	Yes	No	Yes	No	Yes	Yes	Yes	Yes	Yes	Yes	8
Bethune-Cookman	Yes	Yes	Yes	Yes	No	Yes	Yes	Yes	Yes	Yes	9
Florida A&M	Yes	Yes	Yes	No	No	Yes	Yes	Yes	Yes	Yes	8
Grambling State	Yes	Yes	Yes	No	Yes	Yes	Yes	Yes	Yes	Yes	9
Jackson State	Yes	Yes	Yes	No	Yes	Yes	Yes	Yes	Yes	Yes	9
Mississippi Valley	Yes	No	Yes	No	No	Yes	Yes	Yes	Yes	Yes	7
Prairie View	Yes	Yes	Yes	Yes	Yes	Yes	No	Yes	Yes	Yes	9
Southern	Yes	Yes	Yes	No	Yes	Yes	Yes	Yes	Yes	Yes	9
Texas Southern	Yes	Yes	Yes	Yes	Yes	Yes	No	Yes	Yes	Yes	9
Totals	12	9	12	4	9	12	10	12	12	12	106

== Facilities ==
School	Football stadium	Capacity	Basketball arena	Capacity	Baseball stadium	Capacity
Alabama A&M	Louis Crews Stadium	21,000	Alabama A&M Events Center	6,000	Bulldog Field	500
Alabama State	Hornet Stadium	26,500	ASU Acadome	7,400	Wheeler-Watkins Baseball Complex	500
Alcorn State	Spinks-Casem Stadium	22,500	Davey Whitney Complex	7,000	Foster Baseball Field at McGowan Stadium	—N/a
Arkansas-Pine Bluff	Golden Lion Stadium	16,000	K. L. Johnson Complex	4,500	Torii Hunter Baseball/Softball Complex	1,000
Bethune-Cookman	Daytona Stadium	10,000	Moore Gymnasium	3,000	Jackie Robinson Ballpark	4,200
Florida A&M	Bragg Memorial Stadium	25,500	Al Lawson Teaching Gym	9,639	Moore-Kittles Field	500
Grambling State	Eddie G. Robinson Memorial Stadium	19,600	Fredrick C. Hobdy Assembly Center	7,500	Wilbert Ellis Field at Ralph Waldo Emerson Jones Park	1,100
Jackson State	Mississippi Veterans Memorial Stadium	60,492	Williams Assembly Center	8,000	Braddy Field	800
Mississippi Valley State	Rice-Totten Stadium	10,000	Harrison HPER Complex	5,000	Magnolia Field	120
Prairie View A&M	Panther Stadium at Blackshear Field	15,000	William Nicks Building	4,000	John W. Tankersley Field	512
Southern	Ace W. Mumford Stadium	29,000	F. G. Clark Center	7,500	Lee-Hines Field	1,500
Texas Southern	Shell Energy Stadium	22,000	Health and Physical Education Arena	8,100	MacGregor Park	—N/a

== SWAC championships ==
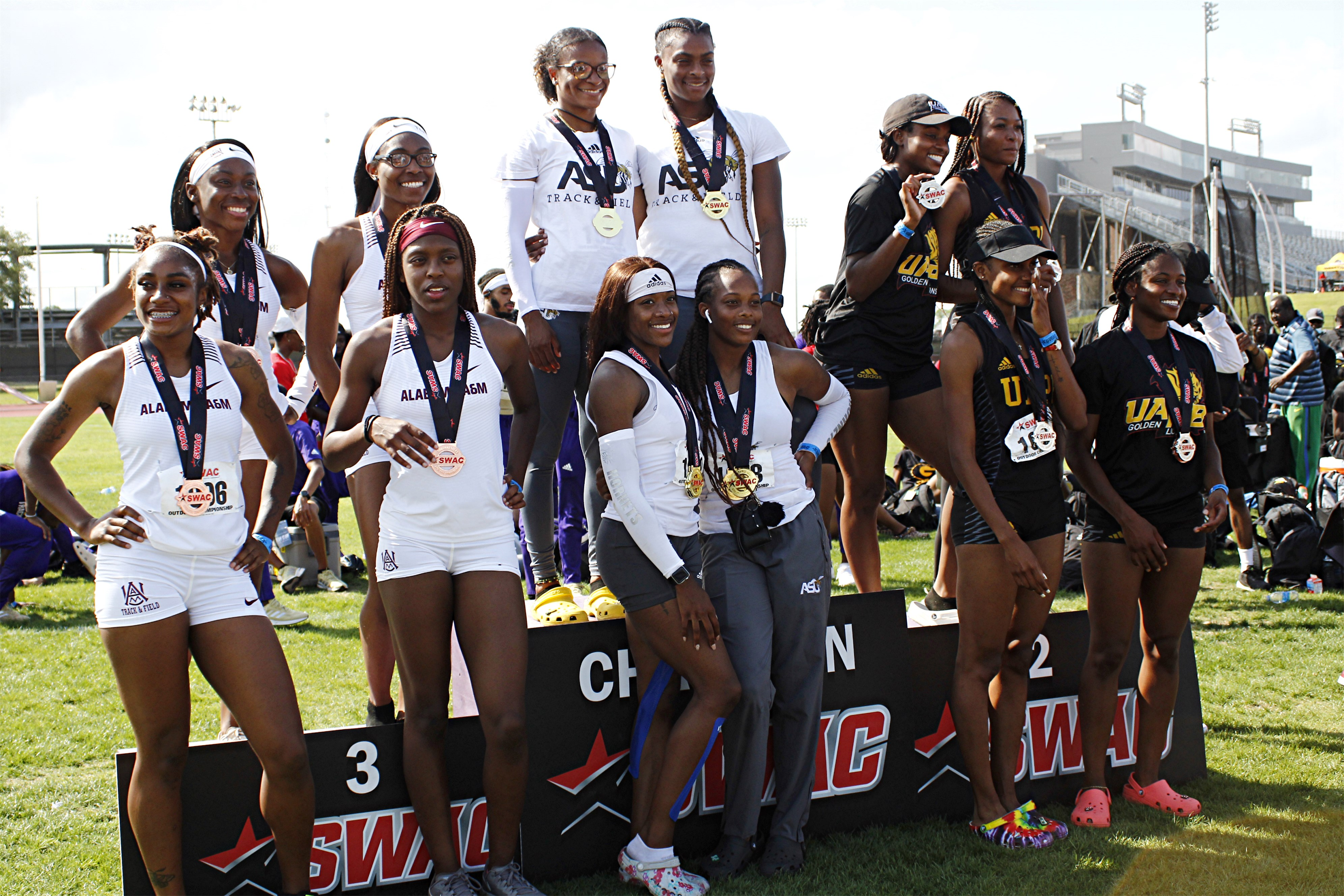
A medal podium at the 2021 SWAC Outdoor Track and Field Championship

=== Football ===
Prior to splitting into divisions and using a postseason championship game to decide its overall champion, the SWAC determined its champions by winning-percentage against conference opponents in regular season play.

In 1933 Langston appeared to win the title outright with a 4–0 conference record after the regular season, while Wiley finished 4–1, and Prairie View A&M finished 3–1. Langston was invited to the Prairie View Bowl, which was won by Prairie View. The Panthers subsequently declared themselves SWAC champions even though their claim was based on a postseason game. The SWAC seems to acknowledge both schools' claims to the title in the conference's football media guide, although some other sources including Michael Hurd's Black College Football, 1892–1992: One Hundred Years of History, Education, and Pride (1993) also list Wiley as an additional co-champion, apparently since all three schools had 4–1 records against conference opponents if the postseason game is incorporated into the regular season conference standings.

Prairie View vacated its 1941 championship. No championship was awarded in 1943 due to World War II. Grambling vacated its 1975 championship due to a violation of SWAC rules for scheduling opponents.

Games from 1999 to 2012 were played at Legion Field in Birmingham, Alabama. The conference moved the game in 2013 to Reliant Stadium in Houston, Texas. Starting in 2019, the game will officially be played at the first place team's home. Since 2015, the winner of the SWAC plays the winner of the MEAC conference in an overall HBCU championship bowl game called the Celebration Bowl in Mercedes-Benz Stadium. The MEAC gave up its automatic bid to the FCS Playoffs for this game.

Texas Southern vacated its 2010 championship due to violations of NCAA rules.

The 2020–21 football season was played during Spring 2021 due to the COVID-19 pandemic.

Year	Champion	Runner-up	Score
1999	Southern	Jackson State	31–30
2000	Grambling	Alabama A&M	14–6
2001	Grambling	Alabama State	38–31
2002	Grambling	Alabama A&M	31–19
2003	Southern	Alabama State	20–9
2004	Alabama State	Southern	40–35
2005	Grambling	Alabama A&M	45–6
2006	Alabama A&M	Arkansas–Pine Bluff	22–13
2007	Jackson State	Grambling	42–31
2008	Grambling	Jackson State	41–9
2009	Prairie View A&M	Alabama A&M	30-24
2010	Texas Southern (vacated)	Alabama State	11–6
2011	Grambling	Alabama A&M	16–15
2012	Arkansas–Pine Bluff	Jackson State	24–21
2013	Southern	Jackson State	34–27
2014	Alcorn State	Southern	38–24
2015	Alcorn State	Grambling	49–21
2016	Grambling	Alcorn State	27–20
2017	Grambling	Alcorn State	40–32
2018	Alcorn State	Southern	37–28
2019	Alcorn State	Southern	39–24
2020	Alabama A&M	Arkansas–Pine Bluff	40–33
2021	Jackson State	Prairie View A&M	27–10
2022	Jackson State	Southern	43–24
2023	Florida A&M	Prairie View A&M	35–14
2024	Jackson State	Southern	41–13
2025	Prairie View A&M	Jackson State	23–21

Since splitting into western and eastern divisions and using a postseason championship game to decide its overall champion, the SWAC determines its division champions by winning-percentage against conference opponents in regular season play. For the 1999 season only, inter-divisional conference games did not count in the conference standings. Each division's outright champion or top-seeded co-champion advances to the championship game.

Texas Southern vacated its 2010 division championship due to violations of NCAA rules.

Year	Western Division champion(s)	Eastern Division champion(s)
1999	Southern	Jackson State
2000	Grambling	Alabama A&M*; Alabama State
2001	Grambling	Alabama State
2002	Grambling	Alabama A&M
2003	Southern*; Grambling	Alabama State*; Alcorn State
2004	Southern	Alabama State
2005	Grambling	Alabama A&M
2006	Arkansas–Pine Bluff	Alabama A&M
2007	Grambling	Jackson State
2008	Grambling	Jackson State
2009	Prairie View A&M	Alabama A&M
2010	Texas Southern* (vacated); Grambling	Alabama State*; Jackson State
2011	Grambling	Alabama A&M*; Alabama State; Jackson State**
2012	Arkansas–Pine Bluff	Jackson State*; Alabama State
2013	Southern	Jackson State
2014	Southern	Alcorn State
2015	Grambling	Alcorn State
2016	Grambling	Alcorn State
2017	Grambling	Alcorn State
2018	Southern	Alcorn State
2019	Southern	Alcorn State
2020	Arkansas–Pine Bluff	Alabama A&M
2021	Prairie View A&M	Jackson State
2022	Southern*; Prairie View A&M	Jackson State
2023	Prairie View A&M	Florida A&M
2024	Southern	Jackson State
2025	Prairie View A&M	Jackson State

Note: an asterisk denotes the division's top-seeded co-champion and representative in the SWAC Championship Game; a double-asterisk denotes that the division's co-champion was ineligible for the SWAC Championship Game due to a violation of SWAC rules that were in effect from 2011 to 2014 concerning Academic Progress Rate (APR) scores.

Starting with the 2021 season with the additions of both Bethune-Cookman and Florida A&M, the football schedule is as follows:

- Each school plays eight conference games (five divisional, three non-divisional) and rotates three teams from the opposite division every two years.
- The best team in the SWAC gets to host the SWAC championship game.
- The SWAC champion advances to the Celebration Bowl versus the MEAC champion. The loser ends its season.

=== Celebration Bowl results ===
Year	MEAC team		SWAC team		Attendance	Series
2015	North Carolina A&T Aggies	41	Alcorn State Braves	34	35,528	MEAC 1–0
2016	North Carolina Central Eagles	9	Grambling Tigers	10	31,096	Tied 1–1
2017	North Carolina A&T Aggies	21	Grambling Tigers	14	25,873	MEAC 2–1
2018	North Carolina A&T Aggies	24	Alcorn State Braves	22	31,672	MEAC 3–1
2019	North Carolina A&T Aggies	64	Alcorn State Braves	44	32,968	MEAC 4–1
2021	South Carolina State Bulldogs	31	Jackson State Tigers	10	48,653	MEAC 5–1
2022	North Carolina Central Eagles	41	Jackson State Tigers	34 (OT)	49,670	MEAC 6–1
2023	Howard Bison	26	Florida A&M Rattlers	30	41,108	MEAC 6–2
2024	South Carolina State Bulldogs	7	Jackson State Tigers	28	36,823	MEAC 6–3
2025	South Carolina State Bulldogs	40	Prairie View A&M Panthers	38 (4OT)	26,703	MEAC 7–3

=== Men's basketball ===
The 1977–78 season was the SWAC's first as an NCAA Division I basketball conference.

The semi-final and championship SWAC Basketball Tournament games are held at the Bill Harris Arena in Birmingham, Alabama. As of the 2017 tournaments, they feature an eight-team three-day layout with the quarterfinal rounds hosted on campus sites. This changes the previous 10-team, five-day tournament format. The higher seeded teams will host a combined eight games leaving two days for travel and practice rounds. The tournament concludes with the semi-finals and championship rounds inside Birmingham's Bill Harris Arena. Winners of the tournaments earn automatic bids to their respective NCAA Division I Tournaments. The championship games are nationally televised live annually on an ESPN network.

Year	Regular season	Coach	Tournament	Coach
1956–57	Texas Southern	Ed Adams	not held	
1957–58	Texas Southern	Ed Adams	not held	
1958–59	Grambling	Fred Hobdy	not held	
1959–60	Grambling	Fred Hobdy	not held	
1960–61	Prairie View A&M	Leroy Moore Jr.	not held	
1961–62	Prairie View A&M	Leroy Moore Jr.	not held	
1962–63	Grambling	Fred Hobdy	not held	
1963–64	Grambling; Jackson	Fred Hobdy; Harrison Wilson	not held	
1964–65	Southern	Richard Mack	not held	
1965–66	Alcorn A&M; Grambling	E. E. Simmons; Fred Hobby	not held	
1966–67	Alcorn A&M; Arkansas AM&N; Grambling	E. E. Simmons; Hubert Clemens; Fred Hobby	not held	
1967–68	Alcorn A&M; Jackson State	Bob Hopkins; Paul Covington	not held	
1968–69	Alcorn A&M	Bob Hopkins	not held	
1969–70	Jackson State	Paul Covington	not held	
1970–71	Grambling	Fred Hobdy	not held	
1971–72	Grambling	Fred Hobdy	not held	
1972–73	Alcorn A&M	Davey L. Whitney	not held	
1973–74	Jackson State	Paul Covington	not held	
1974–75	Jackson State	Paul Covington	not held	
1975–76	Alcorn State	Davey L. Whitney	not held	
1976–77	Texas Southern	Robert Moreland	not held	
1977–78	Southern	Carl Stewart	Jackson State	Paul Covington
1978–79	Alcorn State	Davey L. Whitney	Alcorn State	Davey L. Whitney
1979–80	Alcorn State	Davey L. Whitney	Alcorn State	Davey L. Whitney
1980–81	Alcorn State; Southern	Davey L. Whitney; Carl Stewart	Southern	Carl Stewart
1981–82	Alcorn State; Jackson State	Davey L. Whitney; Paul Covington	Alcorn State	Davey L. Whitney
1982–83	Texas Southern	Robert Moreland	Alcorn State	Davey L. Whitney
1983–84	Alcorn State	Davey L. Whitney	Alcorn State	Davey L. Whitney
1984–85	Alcorn State	Davey L. Whitney	Southern	Bob Hopkins
1985–86	Alcorn State; Southern	Davey L. Whitney; Bob Hopkins	Mississippi Valley State	Lafayette Stribling
1986–87	Grambling	Bob Hopkins	Southern	Ben Jobe
1987–88	Southern	Ben Jobe	Southern	Ben Jobe
1988–89	Grambling; Southern; Texas Southern	Bob Hopkins; Ben Jobe; Robert Moreland	Southern	Ben Jobe
1989–90	Southern	Ben Jobe	Texas Southern	Robert Moreland
1990–91	Jackson State	Andy Stoglin	Jackson State	Andy Stoglin
1991–92	Texas Southern; Mississippi Valley State	Robert Moreland; Lafayette Stribling	Mississippi Valley State	Lafayette Stribling
1992–93	Jackson State	Andy Stoglin	Southern	Ben Jobe
1993–94	Texas Southern	Robert Moreland	Texas Southern	Robert Moreland
1994–95	Texas Southern	Robert Moreland	Texas Southern	Robert Moreland
1995–96	Jackson State; Mississippi Valley State	Andy Stoglin; Lafayette Stribling	Mississippi Valley State	Lafayette Stribling
1996–97	Mississippi Valley State	Lafayette Stribling	Jackson State	Andy Stoglin
1997–98	Texas Southern	Robert Moreland	Prairie View A&M	Elwood Plummer
1998–99	Alcorn State	Davey L. Whitney	Alcorn State	Davey L. Whitney
1999–00	Alcorn State	Davey L. Whitney	Jackson State	Andy Stoglin
2000–01	Alabama State	Rob Spivery	Alabama State	Rob Spivery
2001–02	Alcorn State	Davey L. Whitney	Alcorn State	Davey L. Whitney
2002–03	Prairie View A&M	Jerome Francis	Texas Southern	Ronnie Courtney
2003–04	Alabama State	Rob Spivery	Alabama State	Rob Spivery
2004–05	Alabama A&M	L. Vann Pettaway	Alabama A&M	L. Vann Pettaway
2005–06	Southern	Rob Spivery	Southern	Rob Spivery
2006–07	Mississippi Valley State	James Green	Jackson State	Tevester Anderson
2007–08	Alabama State	Lewis Jackson	Mississippi Valley State	James Green
2008–09	Alabama State	Lewis Jackson	Alabama State	Lewis Jackson
2009–10	Arkansas–Pine Bluff	George Ivory	Arkansas–Pine Bluff	George Ivory
2010–11	Texas Southern	Tony Harvey	Alabama State	Lewis Jackson
2011–12	Mississippi Valley State	Sean Woods	Mississippi Valley State	Sean Woods
2012–13	Southern	Roman Banks	Southern	Roman Banks
2013–14	Southern	Roman Banks	Texas Southern	Mike Davis
2014–15	Texas Southern	Mike Davis	Texas Southern	Mike Davis
2015–16	Texas Southern	Mike Davis	Southern	Roman Banks
2016–17	Texas Southern	Mike Davis	Texas Southern	Mike Davis
2017–18	Grambling	Donte Jackson	Texas Southern	Mike Davis
2018–19	Prairie View A&M	Byron Smith	Prairie View A&M	Byron Smith
2019–20	Prairie View A&M	Byron Smith	Canceled due to the coronavirus pandemic	
2020–21	Prairie View A&M	Byron Smith	Texas Southern	Johnny Jones
2021–22	Alcorn State	Landon Bussie	Texas Southern	Johnny Jones
2022–23	Alcorn State; Grambling	Landon Bussie; Donte Jackson	Texas Southern	Johnny Jones
2023–24	Grambling	Donte Jackson	Grambling	Donte Jackson
2024–25	Southern	Kevin Johnson	Alabama State	Tony Madlock

==== Men's basketball tournament performance by school ====
School	Championships	Years
Texas Southern	11	1990, 1994, 1995, 2003, 2014, 2015, 2017, 2018, 2021, 2022, 2023
Southern	9	1981, 1985, 1987, 1988, 1989, 1993, 2006, 2013, 2016
Alcorn State	7	1979, 1980, 1982, 1983, 1984, 1999, 2002
Jackson State	5	1978, 1991, 1997, 2000, 2007
Mississippi Valley State	5	1986, 1992, 1996, 2008, 2012
Alabama State	5	2001, 2004 2009, 2011, 2025
Prairie View A&M	2	1998, 2019
Alabama A&M	1	2005
Arkansas–Pine Bluff	1	2010
Grambling State	1	2024

=== Women's basketball ===
Year	Regular season	Coach	Tournament	Coach
1981–82	Jackson State	Sadie Magee	Jackson State	Sadie Magee
1982–83	Jackson State	Sadie Magee	Jackson State	Sadie Magee
1983–84	Alcorn State	Shirley Walker	Jackson State	Sadie Magee
1984–85	Alcorn State	Shirley Walker	Jackson State	Sadie Magee
1985–86	Alcorn State	Shirley Walker	Alcorn State	Shirley Walker
1986–87	Grambling	Patricia Bibbs	Mississippi Valley State	Jessie Harris
1987–88	Mississippi Valley State	Jessie Harris	Grambling	Patricia Bibbs
1988–89	Grambling	Patricia Bibbs	Alabama State	Ron Mitchell
1989–90	Grambling	Patricia Bibbs	Jackson State	Andrew Pennington
1990–91	Alcorn State	Shirley Walker	Alcorn State	Shirley Walker
1991–92	Alcorn State	Shirley Walker	Alcorn State	Shirley Walker
1992–93	Alcorn State; Southern	Shirley Walker; Herman Hartman	Mississippi Valley State	Jessie Harris
1993–94	Alcorn State	Shirley Walker	Grambling	Patricia Bibbs
1994–95	Alcorn State; Grambling; Jackson State	Shirley Walker; Patricia Bibbs; Andrew Pennington	Jackson State	Andrew Pennington
1995–96	Alcorn State; Jackson State	Shirley Walker; Andrew Pennington	Grambling	Patricia Bibbs
1996–97	Grambling	Patricia Bibbs	Grambling	Patricia Bibbs
1997–98	Grambling	David Ponton	Grambling	David Ponton
1998–99	Grambling	David Ponton	Grambling	David Ponton
1999–00	Grambling	David Ponton	Alcorn State	Shirley Walker
2000–01	Alcorn State	Shirley Walker	Alcorn State	Shirley Walker
2001–02	Southern	Sandy Pugh	Southern	Sandy Pugh
2002–03	Alabama State; Jackson State	Freda Freeman-Jackson; Denise Taylor	Alabama State	Freda Freeman-Jackson
2003–04	Alabama State	Freda Freeman-Jackson	Southern	Sandy Pugh
2004–05	Alcorn State	Shirley Walker	Alcorn State	Shirley Walker
2005–06	Jackson State; Southern	Denise Taylor; Sandy Pugh	Southern	Sandy Pugh
2006–07	Prairie View A&M; Jackson State	Cynthia Cooper-Dyke; Denise Taylor	Prairie View A&M	Cynthia Cooper-Dyke
2007–08	Prairie View A&M	Cynthia Cooper-Dyke	Jackson State	Denise Taylor
2008–09	Prairie View A&M	Cynthia Cooper-Dyke	Prairie View A&M	Cynthia Cooper-Dyke
2009–10	Southern	Sandy Pugh	Southern	Sandy Pugh
2010–11	Southern	Sandy Pugh	Prairie View A&M	Toyelle Wilson
2011–12	Mississippi Valley State	Nate Kilbert	Prairie View A&M	Toyelle Wilson
2012–13	Texas Southern	Cynthia Cooper-Dyke	Prairie View A&M	Toyelle Wilson
2013–14	Southern	Sandy Pugh	Prairie View A&M	Dawn Brown
2014–15	Alabama State	Freda Freeman-Jackson	Alabama State	Freda Freeman-Jackson
2015–16	Alabama State	Freda Freeman-Jackson	Alabama State	Freda Freeman-Jackson
2016–17	Texas Southern	Johnetta Hayes-Perry	Texas Southern	Johnetta Hayes-Perry
2017–18	Southern	Sandy Pugh	Grambling	Freddie Murray
2018–19	Southern	Carlos Funchess	Southern	Carlos Funchess
2019–20	Southern	Carlos Funchess	Canceled due to the coronavirus pandemic	
2020–21	Jackson State	Tomekia Reed	Jackson State	Tomekia Reed
2021–22	Jackson State	Tomekia Reed	Jackson State	Tomekia Reed
2022–23	Jackson State	Tomekia Reed	Southern	Carlos Funchess
2023–24	Jackson State	Tomekia Reed	Jackson State	Tomekia Reed
2024–25	Southern	Carlos Funchess	Southern	Carlos Funchess

== Baseball ==
This is a list of the last 10 SWAC baseball champions; for the full history, see the list of Southwestern Athletic Conference baseball champions. In recent decades, the conference tournament has determined the overall champions; for specifics concerning the tournament in particular, see the Southwestern Athletic Conference baseball tournament.

Year	Program
2015	Texas Southern
2016	Alabama State
2017	Texas Southern
2018	Texas Southern
2019	Southern
2021	Southern
2022	Alabama State
2023	Florida A&M
2024	Grambling State
2025	Bethune Cookman

== SWAC marching bands ==
Marching bands have a tradition of being a centerpiece of school spirit and pride for each institution in the conference. Furthermore,the showmanship of SWAC marching bands adds to the identity of the conference.

School	Band	Dance Auxiliary
Alabama A&M	Marching Maroon and White	Dancin' Divas
Alabama State	Mighty Marching Hornets	Sensational Stingettes
Alcorn State	Sounds of Dynomite	World Renowned Golden Girls
Arkansas-Pine Bluff	Marching Musical Machine of the Mid-South (M4)	M4 Golden Girls
Bethune-Cookman	Marching Wildcats	14 Karat Gold Dancers
Florida A&M	Marching 100	-----
Grambling State	World Famed Marching Band	Orchesis Dance Company
Jackson State	Sonic Boom of the South	Prancing J-Settes
Mississippi Valley State	Mean Green Marching Machine	Satin Dolls
Prairie View A&M	Marching Storm	Black Foxes
Southern	Human Jukebox	Fabulous Dancing Dolls
Texas Southern	Ocean of Soul	Motion of The Ocean
