= SWAC Football Championship Game =

Annual college football game

SWAC Championship Game
- Sport: College football
- Conference: Southwestern Athletic Conference
- Current stadium: Mississippi Veterans Memorial Stadium (2025)
- Current location: Jackson, Mississippi (2025)
- Played: 1999–present
- Last contest: December 6, 2025
- Current champion: Prairie View A&M (2)
- Most championships: Grambling State (8)
- TV partner: ESPN
- Official website: SWAC Football

Sponsors
- HealthSouth (1999–2002); Jeep (2003); Dodge (2004); Farmers Insurance (2009–2012); Toyota (2013–2018); Cricket Wireless (2019–present)

Host stadiums
- Legion Field (1999–2012); NRG Stadium (2013–2017); Jack Spinks Stadium (2018–2019); Mississippi Veterans Memorial Stadium (2021–2022); Bragg Memorial Stadium (2023)

Host locations
- Birmingham, Alabama (1999–2012); Houston, Texas (2013–2017); Lorman, Mississippi (2018–2019); Jackson, Mississippi (2021–2022, 2024–2025); Tallahassee, Florida (2023)

2024 season matchup
- Southern vs. Jackson State
- (Jackson State 41–13)

2025 season matchup
- Prairie View A&M vs. Jackson State
- Prairie View A&M 23–21

The SWAC Championship Game, officially the Cricket Wireless SWAC Championship Game, is an American college football game that is held annually on the first Saturday in December by the Southwestern Athletic Conference (SWAC) to determine its football champion. The game pits the champion of the Eastern Division against the champion of the Western Division in a game that follows the conclusion of the regular season. From 2015 onward, the winner of the game has represented the SWAC in the Celebration Bowl. Currently, it is the only conference championship game conducted at the Football Championship Subdivision (FCS) level. As of the 2019 season, the game is sponsored by Cricket Wireless.

The game was held at Legion Field in Birmingham, Alabama, from 1999 through 2012, and moved to NRG Stadium in Houston, Texas, for the 2013 through 2017 playings. Since 2018, the game has been played at a campus site, hosted by the participant with the higher ranking, with the exception of the 2021 spring game when the championship moved to its third neutral location at the Mississippi Veterans Memorial Stadium in Jackson, Mississippi due to the COVID-19 pandemic.

== History ==
Following the 1998 season, the SWAC announced that the league would be split into two divisions with the divisional winners meeting in a championship game. At the time of the announcement, a site for the game had not been selected but the Louisiana Superdome in New Orleans, the Astrodome in Houston, the Georgia Dome in Atlanta, Mississippi Veterans Memorial Stadium in Jackson, Ladd–Peebles Stadium in Mobile and Legion Field in Birmingham were each mentioned as potential locations for the event. Additionally, expansion of the league to twelve teams was also under consideration with Tennessee State, Florida A&M, Tuskegee and Morris Brown mentioned as possible additions. In February 1999, a championship game was officially approved by the SWAC Council of Presidents. Officials also stated the winner of the championship game would advance to play in the Heritage Bowl against an opponent from the Mid-Eastern Athletic Conference (MEAC).

The following May, SWAC officials announced the league offices would move from New Orleans to Birmingham and that the championship game would be played at Legion Field. Birmingham was selected over New Orleans, Houston, Baton Rouge and Memphis as the city guaranteed both free office space to house the league headquarters and free access to Legion Field to host the game. The inaugural game was played on December 11, with Southern defeating Jackson State 31–30 before 47,621 fans at Legion Field. The following week, Southern lost to Hampton in the Heritage Bowl; however, the meeting would be the only one for the SWAC champion following the championship game. In January 2000 the NCAA ruled schools cannot compete in two postseason games, effectively ending participation in the Heritage Bowl by the SWAC champion. With the SWAC left unable to compete, the Heritage Bowl folded in February 2000.

In July 2010, commissioner Duer Sharp announced the SWAC was interested in participating in the Legacy Bowl against the MEAC to determine the annual black college football national championship. Although a decision regarding the contest was postponed to 2011, SWAC participation in the event would potentially end the annual championship game in Birmingham. Ultimately, the SWAC championship game was retained, and in May 2013, SWAC officials announced a move from Legion Field to Reliant Stadium in Houston, Texas starting with the December 2013 playing.

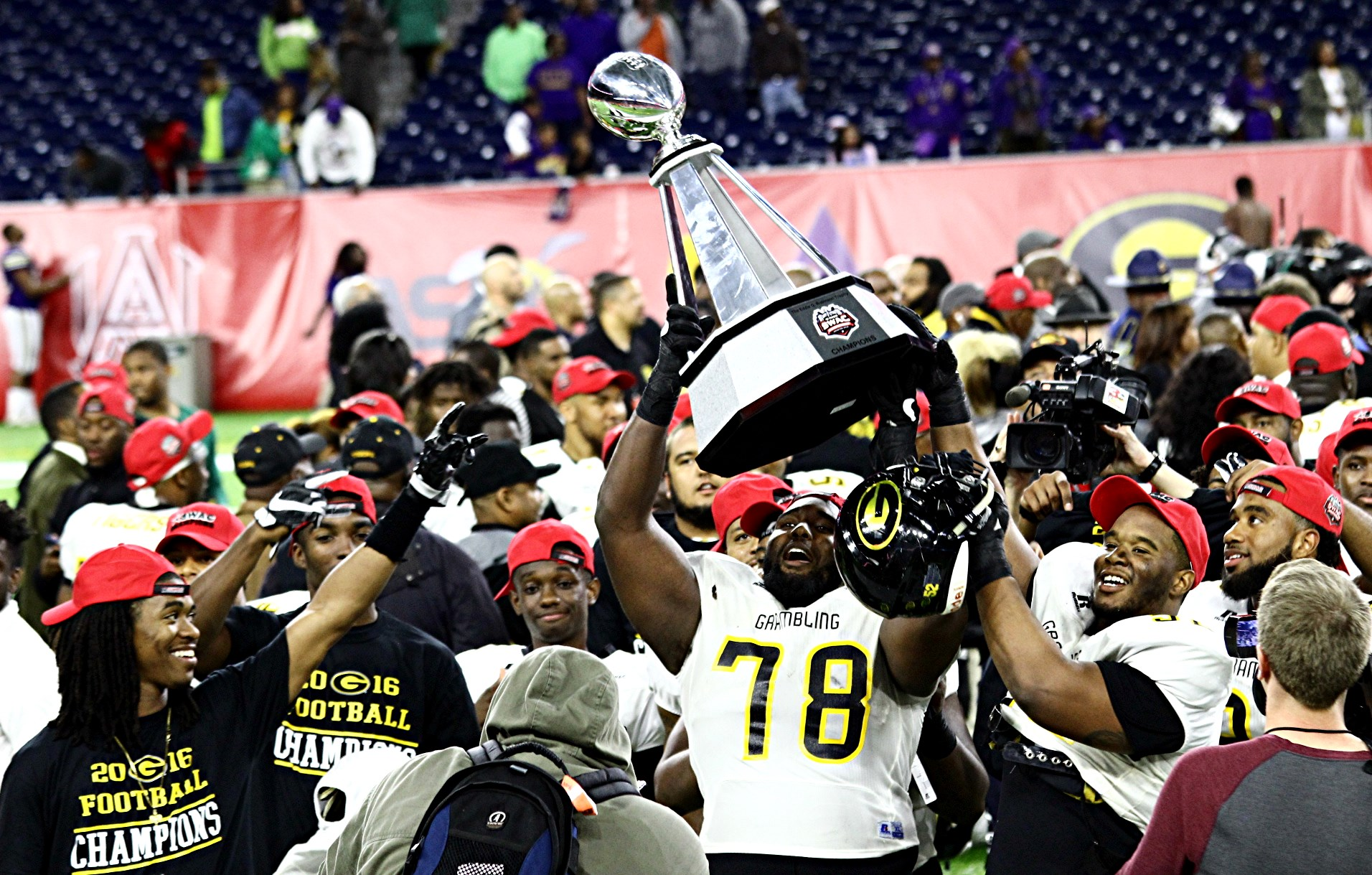
Grambling State Tigers football players raise the trophy after the 2016 championship game

In June 2017, the SWAC announced that it would end its football championship game following that season's contest, and would send its regular season champion to the Celebration Bowl from 2018 onward. In June 2018, the league reversed course, announcing that a championship game would be played in Birmingham. In November 2018, the league further advised that the championship game would be played at the “SWAC institution with the highest ranking.” The December 2018 game was held at Jack Spinks Stadium in Lorman, Mississippi, home field of the Alcorn State Braves; the December 2019 game returned to the same venue. The championship game for the 2020 season, held in the spring of 2021, was moved to a neutral site, Mississippi Veterans Memorial Stadium. Subsequent games have been held at campus sites.

== Team selection ==
When the game was initially proposed, the teams playing in the championship game was to include those with the best record against seven conference opponents from each division. However in August 1999 league officials changed the rule. For the inaugural contest, participation in the championship game was based on the record against the four divisional opponents only, not all conference teams. This format was dropped by the SWAC following the 1999 championship game in favor of the original proposal based on all league games, not only the divisional opponents.

=== Divisions ===
Since the SWAC split into divisions and began conducting a conference championship game, the divisions have only ever been realigned once. In 2021, Florida A&M and Bethune-Cookman joined the SWAC and were placed into the Eastern Division, and Alcorn State was moved to the Western Division to maintain an equal number of teams in both divisions.

Eastern Division

- Alabama A&M Bulldogs
- Alabama State Hornets
- Bethune–Cookman Wildcats
- Florida A&M Rattlers
- Jackson State Tigers
- Mississippi Valley State Delta Devils

Western Division

- Alcorn State Braves
- Arkansas–Pine Bluff Golden Lions
- Grambling State Tigers
- Prairie View A&M Panthers
- Southern Jaguars
- Texas Southern Tigers

== Results ==
Season	Eastern Division		Western Division		Site	Attnd.	MVP	TV	Ref.
1999	Jackson State	30	**Southern**	**31**	Legion Field; Birmingham, AL	47,621	WR Michael Hayes, Southern	BET	
2000	Alabama A&M	6	**Grambling State**	**14**	Legion Field; Birmingham, AL	34,687	DB Calvin Spears, Grambling State	BET	
2001	Alabama State	31	**Grambling State**	**38**	Legion Field; Birmingham, AL	38,487	RB Kendrick Shanklin, Grambling State	BET	
2002	Alabama A&M	19	**Grambling State**	**31**	Legion Field; Birmingham, AL	23,727	QB Bruce Eugene, Grambling State	BET	
2003	Alabama State	9	**Southern**	**20**	Legion Field; Birmingham, AL	31,617	QB Quincy Richard, Southern	MBC Network	
2004	**Alabama State**	**40**	Southern	35	Legion Field; Birmingham, AL	22,327	QB Tarvaris Jackson, Alabama State	BET	
2005	Alabama A&M	6	**Grambling State**	**45**	Legion Field; Birmingham, AL	20,612	QB Bruce Eugene, Grambling State	ESPN Classic	
2006	**Alabama A&M**	**22**	Arkansas–Pine Bluff	13	Legion Field; Birmingham, AL	30,213	LB Johnny Baldwin, Alabama A&M	ESPNU	
2007	**Jackson State**	**42**	Grambling State	31	Legion Field; Birmingham, AL	43,206	QB Jimmy Oliver, Jackson State	ESPN Classic	
2008	Jackson State	9	**Grambling State**	**41**	Legion Field; Birmingham, AL	25,873	QB Greg Dillion, Grambling State	ESPN Classic	
2009	Alabama A&M	24	**Prairie View A&M**	**30**	Legion Field; Birmingham, AL	20,218	QB K. J. Black, Prairie View A&M	ESPN Classic	
2010	Alabama State	6	**Texas Southern**†	**11**	Legion Field; Birmingham, AL	22,350	LB Dejuan Fulghum, Texas Southern	ESPN Classic	
2011	Alabama A&M	15	**Grambling State**	**16**	Legion Field; Birmingham, AL	23,476	LB Cliff Exama, Grambling State	ESPNU	
2012	Jackson State	21	**Arkansas–Pine Bluff**	**24**	Legion Field; Birmingham, AL	32,480	WR Willie Young, Arkansas–Pine Bluff	ESPNU	
2013	Jackson State	27	**Southern**	**34**	NRG Stadium; Houston, TX	38,985	QB Dray Joseph & DB Anthony Balancier, Southern	ESPNU	
2014	**Alcorn State**	**38**	Southern	24	NRG Stadium; Houston, TX	38,969	QB John Gibbs Jr. & LB William Thomas II, Alcorn State	ESPNU	
2015	**Alcorn State**	**49**	Grambling State	21	NRG Stadium; Houston, TX	40,352	RB Darryan Ragsdale & DB Warren Gatewood, Alcorn State	ESPNU	
2016	Alcorn State	20	**Grambling State**	**27**	NRG Stadium; Houston, TX	24,917	RB Martez Carter & LB De'Arius Christmas, Grambling State	ESPNU	
2017	Alcorn State	32	**Grambling State**	**40**	NRG Stadium; Houston, TX	24,610	QB Devante Kincade & LB De’Andre Hogues, Grambling State	ESPNU	
2018	**Alcorn State**	**37**	Southern	28	Jack Spinks Stadium; Lorman, MS	20,652	QB Noah Johnson & LB Brelion Hollis, Alcorn State	ESPNU	
2019	**Alcorn State**	**39**	Southern	24	Jack Spinks Stadium; Lorman, MS	22,365	WR LeCharles Pringle & DB Juwan Taylor, Alcorn State	ESPNU	
2020‡	**Alabama A&M**	**40**	Arkansas–Pine Bluff	33	Mississippi Veterans Memorial Stadium; Jackson, MS	17,248	QB, Aqeel Glass, Alabama A&M	ESPN2	
2021	**Jackson State**	**27**	Prairie View A&M	10	Mississippi Veterans Memorial Stadium; Jackson, MS	50,128	RB Peyton Pickett and LB James Houston, Jackson State	ESPN2	
2022	**Jackson State**	**43**	Southern	24	Mississippi Veterans Memorial Stadium; Jackson, MS	53,754	QB Shedeur Sanders and LB Aubrey Miller Jr., Jackson State	ESPN2	
2023	**Florida A&M**	**35**	Prairie View A&M	14	Bragg Memorial Stadium; Tallahassee, FL	14,628	RB Terrell Jennings and DB Javan Morgan, Florida A&M	ESPN2	
2024	**Jackson State**	**41**	Southern	14	Mississippi Veterans Memorial Stadium; Jackson, MS	23,765	QB Zy McDonald and DB Robert McDaniel, Jackson State	ESPN2	
2025	Jackson State	21	**Prairie View A&M**	**23**	Mississippi Veterans Memorial Stadium; Jackson, MS	32,187	QB Cam Peters and LB Darrell Starling, Jr., Prairie View A&M	ESPN2	
Total	12 Wins	729	14 Wins†	696					

† Texas Southern vacated its 2010 Championship victory, along with all its 2006 to 2010 wins, to avoid the NCAA imposing an athletics Death Penalty.
‡ The 2020 season spanned the fall of 2020 and spring of 2021, with the championship game played on May 1, 2021.

=== Results by team ===
Updated December 2025; 27 editions played, 54 total appearances.

Appearances	Wins	Losses	School	Pct	Seasons
10	8	2	Grambling State	.800	**2000**, **2001**, **2002**, **2005**, 2007, **2008**, **2011**, 2015, **2016**, **2017**
9	3	6	Southern	.333	**1999**, **2003**, 2004, **2013**, 2014, 2018, 2019, 2022, 2024
9	4	5	Jackson State	.444	1999, **2007**, 2008, 2012, 2013, **2021**, **2022**, **2024**, 2025
7	2	5	Alabama A&M	.286	2000, 2002, 2005, **2006**, 2009, 2011, **2020**
6	4	2	Alcorn State	.667	**2014**, **2015**, 2016, 2017, **2018**, **2019**
4	2	2	Prairie View A&M	.500	**2009**, 2021, 2023, **2025**
4	1	3	Alabama State	.250	2001, 2003, **2004**, 2010
3	1	2	Arkansas–Pine Bluff	.333	2006, **2012**, 2020
1	1	0	Florida A&M	1.000	**2023**
1	0	0	Texas Southern	—	2010†
0	0	0	Bethune–Cookman	—	
0	0	0	Mississippi Valley State	—	
54	26†	27	Total	—	

Championship years appear in bold type.
† Texas Southern vacated its 2010 championship game victory.

=== Previous SWAC champions ===
Prior to splitting into divisions and using a postseason championship game to decide its overall champion, the SWAC determined its champions by winning-percentage against conference opponents in regular season play.

In 1933 Langston appeared to win the title outright with a 4-0 conference record after the regular season, while Wiley finished 4-1, and Prairie View A&M finished 3-1. Langston was invited to the Prairie View Bowl, which was won by Prairie View. The Panthers subsequently declared themselves SWAC champions even though their claim was based on a postseason game. The SWAC seems to acknowledge both schools' claims to the title in the conference's football media guide, although some other sources including Michael Hurd's Black College Football, 1892–1992: One Hundred Years of History, Education, and Pride (1993) also list Wiley as an additional co-champion, apparently since all three schools had 4-1 records against conference opponents if the postseason game is incorporated into the regular season conference standings.

Prairie View vacated its 1941 championship. No championship was awarded in 1943 due to World War II. Grambling State vacated its 1975 championship due to a violation of SWAC rules for scheduling opponents.

Year	Champion(s)
1921	Wiley
1922	Paul Quinn
1923	Wiley
1924	Paul Quinn
1925	Bishop
1926	Samuel Huston
1927	Wiley
1928	Wiley
1929	Wiley
1930	Wiley
1931	Prairie View A&M
1932	Wiley
1933	Langston; Prairie View A&M
1934	Texas College
1935	Texas College
1936	Langston; Texas College
1937	Langston; Southern
1938	Langston; Southern
1939	Langston
1940	Langston; Southern
1941	Prairie View A&M (vacated)
1942	Texas College
1943	(no championship awarded)
1944	Langston; Texas College; Wiley
1945	Wiley
1946	Southern
1947	Southern
1948	Southern
1949	Langston; Southern
1950	Southern
1951	Prairie View A&M
1952	Prairie View A&M
1953	Prairie View A&M
1954	Prairie View A&M
1955	Southern
1956	Texas Southern; Wiley
1957	Wiley
1958	Prairie View A&M
1959	Southern
1960	Grambling State; Prairie View A&M; Southern
1961	Jackson State
1962	Jackson State
1963	Prairie View A&M
1964	Prairie View A&M
1965	Grambling State
1966	Arkansas-Pine Bluff; Grambling State; Southern; Texas Southern
1967	Grambling State
1968	Alcorn State; Grambling State; Texas Southern
1969	Alcorn State
1970	Alcorn State
1971	Grambling State
1972	Grambling State; Jackson State
1973	Grambling State; Jackson State
1974	Alcorn State; Grambling State
1975	Grambling State (vacated); Jackson State; Southern
1976	Alcorn State
1977	Grambling State
1978	Grambling State
1979	Alcorn State; Grambling State
1980	Grambling State; Jackson State
1981	Jackson State
1982	Jackson State
1983	Grambling State
1984	Alcorn State
1985	Grambling State; Jackson State
1986	Jackson State
1987	Jackson State
1988	Jackson State
1989	Grambling State
1990	Jackson State
1991	Alabama State
1992	Alcorn State
1993	Southern
1994	Alcorn State; Grambling State
1995	Jackson State
1996	Jackson State
1997	Southern
1998	Southern

== Bibliography ==
- Southwestern Athletic Conference Football Media Guide. Birmingham, AL: Southwestern Athletic Conference. 2010.
