= Rice–Totten Stadium =

Stadium in Mississippi, United States

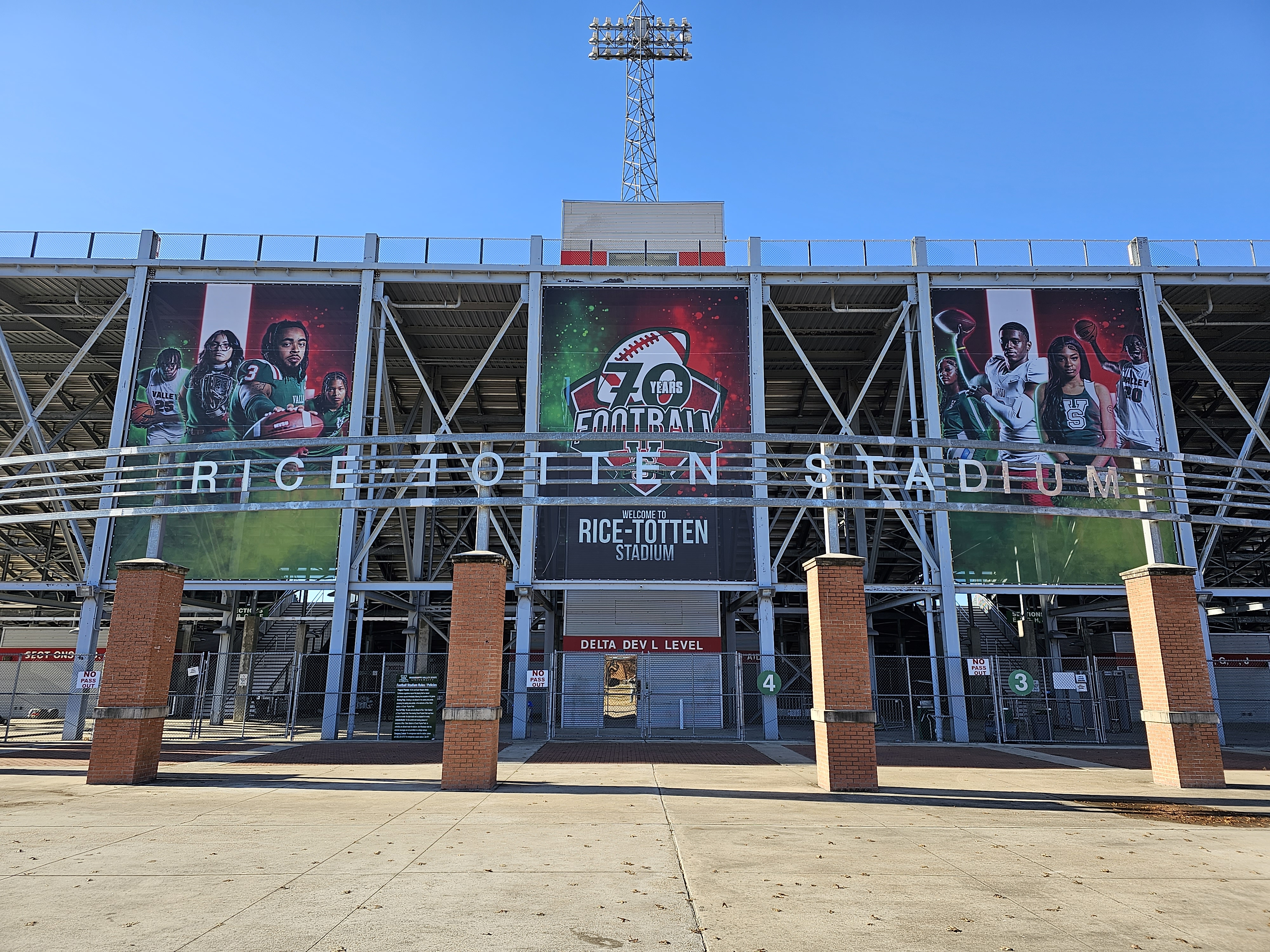
- Interactive map of Rice–Totten Stadium
- Former names: Magnolia Stadium (1958–2000)
- Location: Mississippi Valley State University; Itta Bena, Mississippi
- Coordinates: 33°30′34″N 90°20′35″W
- Owner: Mississippi Valley State University
- Operator: Mississippi Valley State University
- Capacity: 10,000
- Surface: Field turf

Construction
- Opened: 1958

Tenant
- Mississippi Valley State Delta Devils (NCAA)

Rice–Totten Stadium is a 10,000-seat multi-purpose stadium location in Itta Bena, Mississippi, United States. It serves as the home field of the Mississippi Valley State Delta Devils football team of Mississippi Valley State University. The stadium opened in 1958 as Magnolia Stadium and was renamed in 2000 in honor of former MVSU football players Jerry Rice and Willie Totten, who set many NCAA Division I-AA records in the 1980s. Rice went on to a 20-year career in the National Football League (NFL) and was inducted into the Pro Football Hall of Fame. Totten played professional football for several years after college and then went into coaching, serving as the head football coach at Mississippi Valley State from 2002 to 2009. He is one of the few college football coaches to have coached a game at a facility named after themselves

In 2005, the field at Rice–Totten Stadium was renamed Charles "Chuck" Prophet Field in honor of the school's former athletic director and sports information director.

== Gallery ==
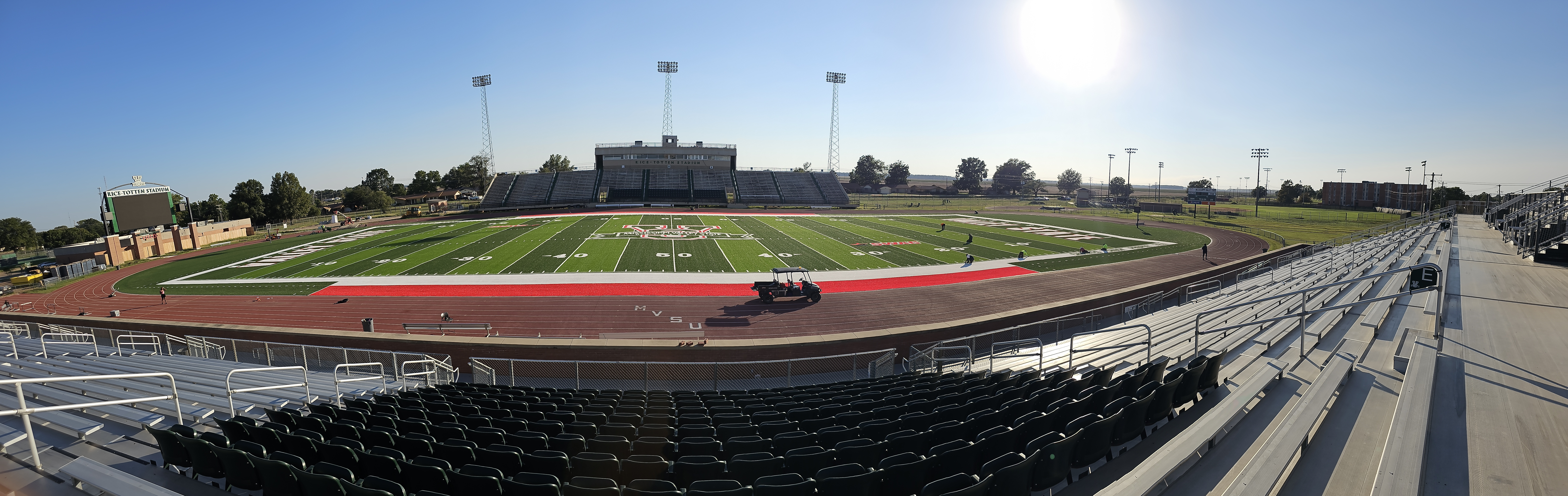
Field turf upgrade at Rice–Totten Stadium (completed in 2024)

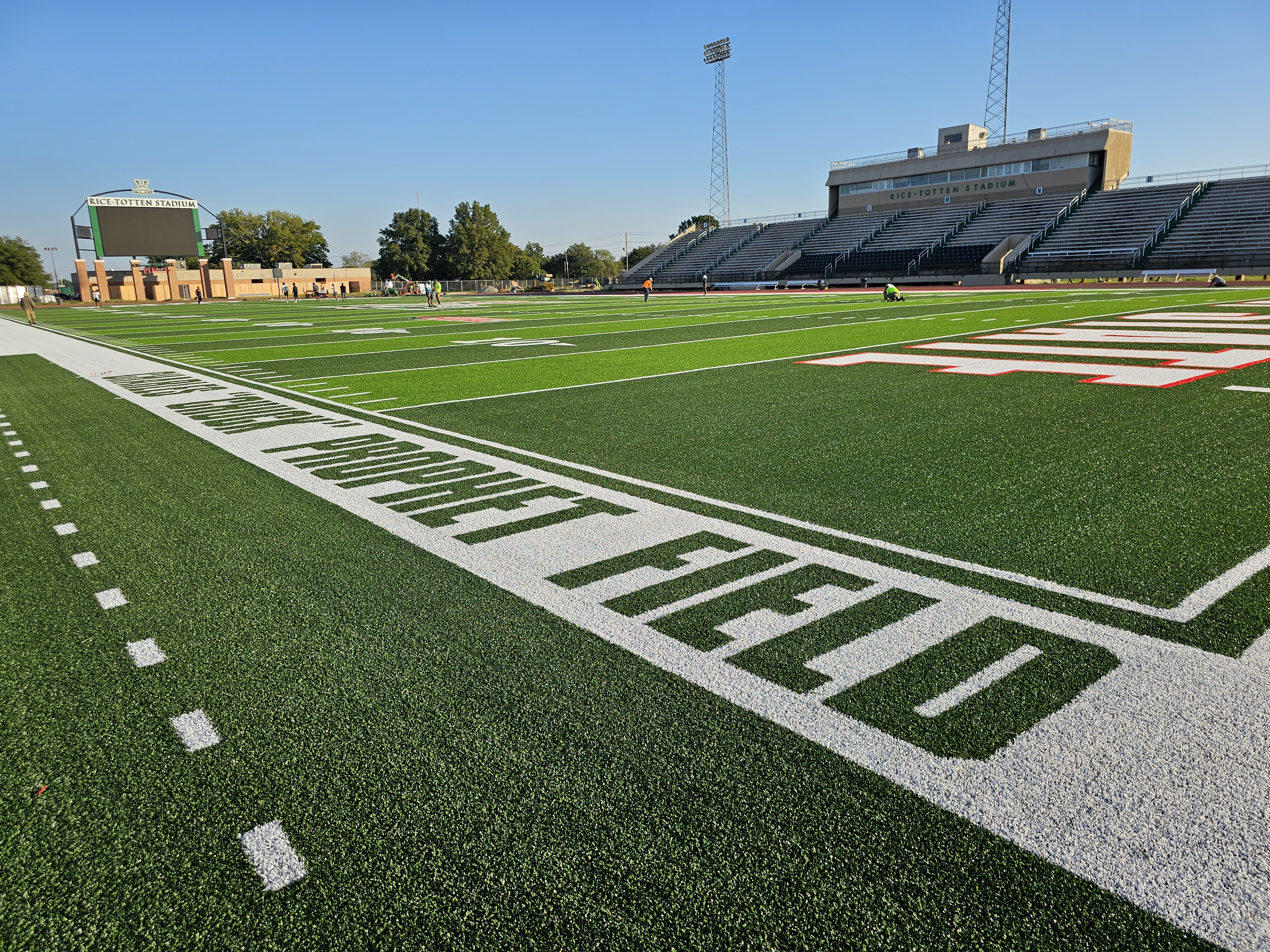
Field turf upgrade at Rice–Totten Stadium (completed in 2024)

== See also ==
- List of NCAA Division I FCS football stadiums
