= Red River State Fair Classic =

Former HBCU classic game

- Stadium: Independence Stadium (1924–1989, 1999, 2001–2003, 2010–2013, 2015–2016)
- Location: Shreveport, Louisiana, U.S.
- Previous stadiums: State Fairgrounds race track (1911–1917, 1919–1923); Centenary Field (1927)
- Operated: 1911–1917, 1919–1989, 1999, 2001–2003, 2010–2013, 2015–2016

Former names
- State Fair Game (1911–1917, 1919–1923); State Fair Classic (1924–1989, 2002–2003); Red River Classic (1999, 2002); Port City Classic–State Fair Game (2001); Shreveport Classic (2010–2013)

2016 matchup
- Grambling State Tigers vs. Alabama State Hornets (21–0)

The Red River State Fair Classic (formerly the State Fair Classic and, more recently, the Shreveport Classic) was an American college football game played annually in Shreveport, Louisiana, at State Fair Stadium (now called Independence Stadium) during the State Fair of Louisiana. It traced its historical lineage from a series of 169 games played over the 106 football seasons between 1911 and 2016. By having first paired historically black colleges and universities in 1915, the contest held the distinction of being the oldest documented annual black college football classic, edging out the Turkey Day Classic by nine years and the similar Texas State Fair Classic by ten years.

== Background ==
The fair began in 1906, and efforts were made immediately to schedule a football game as a draw, specifically a game between Louisiana State University and the Shreveport Athletic Club. Although plans for that game fell through, personnel from the fair persisted and even made a notable, but unsuccessful, attempt to revive the suspended LSU–Tulane rivalry game for the 1910 fair. The fair was finally able to host college football games regularly starting in 1911, on the infield of the race track at the fairgrounds. Nearby schools Louisiana Tech and Northwestern State played in that first game, a 39–0 Bulldog victory. However, even that game was almost not played when NSU initially refused to take the field on game day, instead issuing last-minute challenges to the proposed game rules as well as to the eligibility of several of Tech's players. The annual Arkansas–LSU game was made the main draw two years later. By 1914, $900 of the fair's $35,039 budget was earmarked specifically for "football." The 1924 Arkansas–LSU game featured a silver football trophy as part of the dedication ceremonies for the new host field, State Fair Stadium. After LSU won for the seventh straight time in 1936, that series was discontinued, and Louisiana Tech and NSU returned to playing in the featured game. When Louisiana Tech began efforts in the late 1980s to move into the NCAA's Division I-A, NSU began playing Louisiana–Monroe in the game.

In the past, as many as four college games were played over the course of a single fair, although the "State Fair Classic" moniker was used interchangeably to describe any of the games, not just the featured game. These games tended to include schools from the Ark-La-Tex area. The hometown school, Centenary, hosted numerous games over the years. Southwestern Athletic Conference schools (usually Southern or Grambling State and Bishop or Wiley colleges) were known to play on Monday, in conjunction with the fair's "Negro Day"—although the 1961 Grambling–Prairie View A&M game was overshadowed by a fan boycott, staged by the Congress of Racial Equality in an effort to encourage improved integration of the fair. When Texas College withdrew from the SWAC several months later and left the Panthers with only two home games, Prairie View decided to invoke SWAC scheduling rules to move the Grambling series back to on-campus venues, ending its Shreveport fair phase. Through the years there was considerable cross-over between SWAC teams that played in Louisiana's State Fair Classic and Texas' own State Fair Classic, and the Grambling–Prairie View series itself is now held at the Texas fair. With the Negro Day game played on Mondays and the featured game and Centenary game usually confined to two of the three weekends that the fair extended through, occasionally another game would be played on the third weekend—college varsity-level or otherwise. College freshman and high school teams were known to compete at the fair in its earlier years, including some pre-Louisiana High School Athletic Association era state championship games. In 1934, 1942, and 1945 military service teams were extended invitations to play; during World War II many colleges—including each of the classic's regular hosts, Centenary, Louisiana Tech, NSU, and Southern—had to discontinue football, while the service teams that appeared in their place helped fill in the gaps on active college teams' schedules and were even included in the Associated Press' college football rankings and bowl games as well.

== Discontinuation of the "featured game" ==
With the Centenary game ceasing after the 1947 campaign (Centenary had disbanded its football program) and Negro Day no longer being observed following the 1961 fair, only the featured game remained as an annual contest at the fair. Once the annual Louisiana Tech–NSU series had ended, Tech was initially still willing to continue hosting a game at the fair with a new opponent but then at mid-season in 1988 unexpectedly moved its fair appearance with Arkansas State to its home stadium in a last-minute attempt to boost lagging ticket sales. The NSU–ULM series also returned to on-campus stadiums in 1990. The fair was now without regular tenants and, at times, had to reinvent itself. The Red River Classic—a pre-existing game that had long served as an annual, early-season game for Grambling and Arkansas–Pine Bluff at Independence Stadium—was moved to late October, in conjunction with the fair, for the 1999 campaign. In 2001 a contest billed as the "Port City Classic–State Fair Game" was hosted by Southern during the fair, but in 2002 the Port City Classic was spun-off separately from the fair and became an early September game instead; the Red River Classic then returned to the fair in its place. Louisiana Christian's newly-revived football program also saw a return to the fair that season, as well as in 2003. Prairie View and Grambling, in addition to competing annually at the Texas state fair, have hosted the most recent Louisiana fair games too. Prairie View hosted a series of four annual games dubbed the "Shreveport Classic" starting in 2010, and Grambling began hosting the newly-named "Red River State Fair Classic" during the 2015 season. The City of Shreveport's government actively worked to revive the classic in 2010 and, through 2016, remained a sponsor despite the fact that the classic's new name dropped its reference to the city and added back its reference to the state fair (as well as to the old Red River Classic).

== Current status ==
After initially designating its October 28 contest against Texas Southern as its Red River State Fair Classic game when it released its official 2017 schedule, Grambling instead later announced that the match-up would be moved to Grambling to serve as a homecoming game, allowing GSU to play a fourth home game in Eddie Robinson Stadium, which had just undergone a multi-million dollar renovation. The old "Red River Classic" name was recycled for the game even though it was rescheduled to be played outside of the immediate vicinity of the Red River. No games have been scheduled at the fair since.

In 2022, the old Shreveport Classic name was also revived but for a game that would be held in September without any direct associations to the state fair itself.

Although Centenary resurrected its football program in 2024, it has not yet returned to hosting games at the fair.

== Notable games ==
A number of games stand out in the series. The 1915 Arkansas–LSU game saw the largest college football crowd (20,000) in the history of the southwestern U.S. at the time. Also in 1915 the fair broke the color barrier and began hosting African American teams (with that game being the classic's single most lopsided college varsity affair as well, a 76–0 Wiley College win over Homer College of Homer, Louisiana; in 1921 Wiley also defeated a local high school at the fair by a score of 114–0). No college games were played at the fair in 1918; the Spanish flu pandemic was ongoing, and World War I would not come to an end until a week after the fair's final scheduled day—generating discussions to curtail or outright cancel the fair. With the 1924 Arkansas–LSU game being played for a silver football trophy (as part of the dedication ceremonies for the new stadium), the series became the first future Southeastern Conference rivalry to feature a trophy. The 1927 Centenary game was moved to Centenary Field to preserve the soggy playing surface for the featured Arkansas–LSU game. In 1936, LSU chose to install Mike I as its first live bengal tiger mascot at the venue, instead of in Baton Rouge. A 2006 book by Mark and Jacqueline Scott called Beat TECH! Inside the Louisiana State Fair Football Classics, 1940–1942 covers several prominent Louisiana Tech–NSU games before World War II interrupted the series. The 1945 series of games was historic in that it featured a rare look at multiple service teams of the era, shortly before they were phased out with the end of World War II. The 1949 fair goers got to witness Louisiana Tech pull out a 28–21 victory over Northwestern State within the final 30 seconds. In 1950, Wiley quarterback A. Bolen threw an 82-yard touchdown pass to end William Gray "(l)ate in the fourth quarter" to force a 14–14 tie and hand Grambling one of its few non-wins in the classic over the decades. In 1968, Louisiana Tech quarterback Terry Bradshaw threw an 82-yard pass to Ken Liberto with 18 seconds remaining to pull out a 42–39 victory over NSU in what "is generally considered the pinnacle of the State Fair Classic." The 1979 edition has also been cited as "one of the better games ever played in the storied State Fair Classic," as it was capped with a 93-yard touchdown drive by NSU at the one-minute mark for the deciding points over Tech, 25–21.

Although the annual classic had long provided exhibitions of college football for one the largest markets without any home college team—Centenary would not sanction a varsity football team again until 2024—its local cultural significance may have been eclipsed by the Independence Bowl, if judging purely based upon the bowl's generally higher attendance figures. In the classic's 57 most recent games—those played between 1956 and 2016—it drew 949,409 fans total, for an average of 16,656 per game. The largest documented crowd occurred at the 1980 game (36,000). The classic has also had several bouts where the turnout took unexpectedly heavy hits, including the aforementioned second game of the 1961 fair (which was played under a fan boycott), the second game of 1974 (which attracted just 300 people to watch then-new Baptist Christian College of Shreveport play in one of its first ever games), the second game of 1975 (which drew only 382 people, due to substantial rainfall), and the 1984 game (which had 6,042 no-shows, also as a result of a downpour).

== Classic games by year ==
Year	Date	Winning team		Losing team		Attendance
1911	November 4	Louisiana Industrial	39	Louisiana State Normal	0	6,000 (Game called "State Fair Game")
1912	November 2	Henderson–Brown	14	Louisiana Industrial	0	
1913	November 8	Louisiana Industrial	53	Louisiana College	0	
1913	November 8	LSU	12	Arkansas	7	
1914	November 7	Louisiana Industrial	14	Centenary	0	
1914	November 7	Arkansas	20	LSU	12	14,000
1915	November 6	Louisiana Industrial	20	Louisiana State Normal	7	
1915	November 6	LSU	13	Arkansas	7	20,000 (Then-largest football crowd in the Southwest)
1915	November 8	Wiley	76	Homer	0	(First documented black football classic)
1916	November 4	Louisiana Industrial	24	Louisiana State Normal	0	
1916	November 4	LSU	17	Arkansas	7	5,000
1916	November 6	Bishop	55	Straight	0	
1917	November 3	Louisiana State Normal	7	Louisiana Industrial	0	
1917	November 3	Arkansas	14	LSU	0	
1918	(No intercollegiate games played at fair, due to Spanish flu pandemic and World War I)					
1919	October 25	Louisiana State Normal	7	Centenary	6	3,500
1919	October 25	LSU	20	Arkansas	0	7,000
1919	November 1	Hendrix	6	Centenary	0	
1920	November 6	LSU	3	Arkansas	0	
1921	October 29	Louisiana State Normal	7	Centenary	0	
1921	October 31	Wiley	114	Central Colored High School (LA)	0	(Largest margin of victory)
1921	November 5	LSU	10	Arkansas	7	
1922	October 21	Tennessee Docs	14	Centenary	0	10,000
1922	October 23	Bishop	19	Southern	0	
1922	October 25	Centenary	20	Louisiana State Normal	0	
1922	October 28	Arkansas	40	LSU	6	
1923	October 20	Centenary	46	Louisiana State Normal	0	
1923	October 27	Arkansas	26	LSU	13	13,000
1924	November 1	Arkansas	10	LSU	7	8,000 (State Fair Stadium dedication trophy game; game now called "State Fair Classic")
1924	November 3	Wiley	6	Southern	0	
1924	November 8	Centenary	7	Central State (OK)	6	
1925	October 31	Arkansas	12	LSU	0	8,000
1925	November 2	Wiley	6	Southern	0	
1925	November 7	Centenary	17	Central State (OK)	7	
1926	October 30	Centenary	14	Central State (OK)	10	
1926	November 1	Wiley	32	Southern	6	
1926	November 6	Stephen F. Austin	28	Louisiana State Normal	0	
1926	November 6	LSU	14	Arkansas	0	
1927	October 28	Centenary	20	Birmingham–Southern	7	(Game moved to Centenary Field, due to field conditions)
1927	October 29	Arkansas	28	LSU	0	15,000
1927	October 31	Bishop	34	Southern	0	
1927	November 5	Louisiana State Normal	26	Stephen F. Austin	0	
1928	October 27	Union (TN)	26	Louisiana Tech	0	
1928	October 29	Wiley	33	Southern	6	1,000
1928	November 2	Louisiana State Normal	26	Stephen F. Austin	0	
1928	November 3	Arkansas	7	LSU	0	12,000
1929	November 2	Arkansas	32	LSU	0	8,000
1929	November 4	Southern	45	Arkansas Baptist	7	
1929	November 9	Centenary	0	Henderson State	0	
1930	October 25	Centenary	7	Baylor	2	
1930	October 27	Wiley	6	Southern	6	
1930	November 1	LSU	27	Arkansas	12	7,000
1931	October 24	LSU	13	Arkansas	6	10,000
1931	October 26	Southern	14	Wiley	7	
1931	October 31	Texas A&M	7	Centenary	0	
1932	October 22	LSU	14	Arkansas	0	12,000
1932	October 29	Centenary	7	Texas A&M	0	
1933	October 21	LSU	20	Arkansas	0	10,000
1933	October 23	Southern	6	Bishop	0	
1933	October 28	Centenary	0	TCU	0	
1934	October 20	LSU	16	Arkansas	0	12,000
1934	October 22	Bishop	45	Louisiana Negro Normal	0	
1934	October 26	Texas Military College	26	Barksdale Field	6	
1934	October 27	Centenary	13	TCU	0	
1935	October 19	LSU	13	Arkansas	7	10,000
1935	October 21	Bishop	47	Southern	0	
1935	October 26	TCU	27	Centenary	7	8,000
1936	October 24	LSU	19	Arkansas	7	15,000
1936	October 31	Ole Miss	24	Centenary	7	8,000
1937	October 23	Louisiana Tech	14	Louisiana State Normal	0	12,000
1937	October 30	Centenary	0	Mississippi State	0	10,000
1937	November 1	Wiley	7	Southern	0	5,000
1938	October 22	Louisiana State Normal	7	Louisiana Tech	6	5,500
1938	October 29	Centenary	7	Loyola (CA)	6	6,000
1938	October 31	Wiley	14	Southern	12	
1939	October 21	Louisiana State Normal	26	Louisiana Tech	0	7,500
1939	October 28	TCU	21	Centenary	0	6,500
1939	October 30	Wiley	12	Southern	9	3,000
1940	October 19	Louisiana State Normal	13	Louisiana Tech	0	7,500
1940	October 26	Southwestern Louisiana	6	Louisiana College	0	7,500
1940	October 28	Southern	19	Wiley	0	3,500
1941	October 18	Louisiana Tech	10	Louisiana State Normal	0	8,000
1941	October 25	Washington University	13	Centenary	7	1,500
1941	October 27	Wiley	6	Southern	22	1,000 (forfeited by Southern)
1942	October 24	Louisiana State Normal	10	Louisiana Tech	6	3,500
1942	October 31	DeRidder Army Air Base	13	Camp Polk	0	1,500 (Camp Polk was represented by their "302nd Ordnance Regiment" team)
1942	November 2	Wiley	9	Xavier (LA)	7	3,000
1943	November 1	Wiley	73	Xavier (LA)	0	7,000
1944	October 30	Wiley	56	Xavier (LA)	0	5,000
1945	October 20	Selman Army Airfield	13	Barksdale Field	0	4,500
1945	October 27	Barksdale Field	46	Camp Swift	0	3,000
1945	October 29	Wiley	26	Randolph Field	0	2,000 (Randolph Field was represented by their "Brown Bombers" team)
1946	October 26	Louisiana Tech	14	Northwestern State	7	14,000
1946	October 28	Tuskegee	21	Wiley	6	15,000
1947	October 18	Chattanooga	20	Centenary	0	9,000
1947	October 25	Louisiana Tech	24	Northwestern State	0	10,000
1947	October 27	Grambling	20	Bishop	6	8,000
1948	October 23	Louisiana Tech	10	Northwestern State	7	12,000
1948	November 1	Arkansas AM&N	21	Bishop	6	
1949	October 22	Louisiana Tech	28	Northwestern State	21	
1949	October 31	Grambling	55	Tuskegee	0	8,000
1950	October 21	Louisiana Tech	15	Northwestern State	7	10,000
1950	October 23	Grambling	14	Wiley	14	8,000
1951	October 20	Louisiana Tech	21	Northwestern State	6	10,000
1951	October 22	Grambling	19	Wiley	13	9,000
1952	October 18	Louisiana Tech	22	Northwestern State	0	
1952	October 20	Grambling	18	Wiley	14	8,000
1953	October 24	Northwestern State	15	Louisiana Tech	7	7,000
1953	October 26	Grambling	26	Wiley	0	4,500
1954	October 23	Louisiana Tech	13	Northwestern State	6	10,000
1954	October 25	Grambling	35	Wiley	12	10,000
1955	October 22	Louisiana Tech	21	Northwestern State	20	12,000
1955	October 24	Grambling	20	Wiley	0	
1956	October 20	Louisiana Tech	0	Northwestern State	0	11,000
1956	October 22	Grambling	34	Morris Brown	12	5,000
1957	October 19	Louisiana Tech	20	Northwestern State	13	19,500
1957	October 21	Wiley	40	Grambling	12	8,000
1958	October 18	Northwestern State	18	Louisiana Tech	14	22,000
1958	October 20	Grambling	19	Wiley	15	10,000
1959	October 24	Louisiana Tech	27	Northwestern State	14	23,500
1959	October 26	Prairie View A&M	35	Grambling	6	9,500
1960	October 22	Louisiana Tech	13	Northwestern State	7	18,000
1960	October 24	Grambling	26	Prairie View A&M	0	10,000
1961	October 21	Northwestern State	19	Louisiana Tech	7	24,000
1961	October 23	Grambling	34	Prairie View A&M	14	5,000 (Game played under fan boycott, due to lack of integration at the fair)
1961	October 28	Northeast Louisiana State	27	Southwestern Louisiana	20	3,700
1962	October 20	Northwestern State	19	Louisiana Tech	2	22,000
1962	October 27	Southwestern Louisiana	18	Northeast Louisiana State	10	3,000
1963	October 19	Louisiana Tech	27	Northwestern State	13	18,500
1964	October 24	Louisiana Tech	16	Northwestern State	7	30,000
1965	October 23	Louisiana Tech	42	Northwestern State	14	27,000
1966	October 22	Northwestern State	28	Louisiana Tech	7	25,000
1967	October 21	Northwestern State	7	Louisiana Tech	0	28,000
1968	October 19	Louisiana Tech	42	Northwestern State	39	28,000
1969	October 18	Louisiana Tech	42	Northwestern State	21	31,000
1970	October 24	Northwestern State	20	Louisiana Tech	17	25,006
1971	October 23	Louisiana Tech	33	Northwestern State	21	29,000
1972	October 21	Louisiana Tech	20	Northwestern State	16	27,000
1973	October 20	Louisiana Tech	26	Northwestern State	7	33,000
1974	October 19	Louisiana Tech	34	Northwestern State	0	26,000
1974	October 26	Mississippi College	61	Baptist Christian	14	300 (Smallest documented crowd)
1975	October 18	Louisiana Tech	41	Northwestern State	14	26,496
1975	October 25	Jacksonville State	21	Northwestern State	0	382
1976	October 23	Louisiana Tech	35	Northwestern State	6	24,200
1976	October 30	North Texas State	14	Louisiana Tech	8	6,532
1977	October 22	Louisiana Tech	30	Northwestern State	8	24,086
1978	October 21	Louisiana Tech	45	Northwestern State	20	21,000
1978	October 28	North Texas State	16	Louisiana Tech	14	6,510
1979	October 20	Northwestern State	25	Louisiana Tech	21	19,212
1980	October 18	Louisiana Tech	27	Northwestern State	23	36,000 (Largest documented crowd)
1981	October 24	Louisiana Tech	37	Northwestern State	33	22,300
1982	October 23	Louisiana Tech	33	Northwestern State	0	17,626
1983	October 22	Louisiana Tech	21	Northwestern State	10	13,996
1984	October 20	Louisiana Tech	5	Northwestern State	0	9,424
1985	October 26	Louisiana Tech	33	Northwestern State	17	14,783
1986	October 25	Louisiana Tech	13	Northwestern State	13	12,301
1987	October 24	Louisiana Tech	23	Northwestern State	0	15,232
1988	October 22	Northwestern State	27	Northeast Louisiana	15	11,568
1989	October 21	Northeast Louisiana	14	Northwestern State	14	14,225
1990–1998	(No intercollegiate games played at fair)					
1999	October 23	Grambling State	24	Arkansas–Pine Bluff	19	20,100 ("Red River Classic" game moved to state fair)
2000	(No intercollegiate games played at fair)					
2001	October 27	Southern	49	Mississippi Valley State	0	10,514 (Game now called "Port City Classic–State Fair Game")
2002	October 19	Grambling State	54	Arkansas–Pine Bluff	15	11,017 ("Red River Classic" game moved to state fair again)
2002	November 2	East Texas Baptist	28	Louisiana College	13	5,000 (Game now called "State Fair Classic" again)
2003	November 1	East Texas Baptist	30	Louisiana College	3	4,927
2004–2009	(No intercollegiate games played at fair)					
2010	October 23	Prairie View A&M	30	Southern	16	19,979 (Game now called "Shreveport Classic")
2011	October 29	Jackson State	44	Prairie View A&M	14	17,743
2012	October 27	Prairie View A&M	49	Southern	29	12,223
2013	October 26	Jackson State	51	Prairie View A&M	38	5,116
2014	(No intercollegiate games played at fair)					
2015	November 7	Grambling State	41	Texas Southern	15	9,868 (Game now called "Red River State Fair Classic")
2016	November 12	Grambling State	21	Alabama State	0	15,043

Note: games were played on "Negro Day" in 1917 and 1919; these games were only vaguely described by the curtailed wartime press as being "Games by visiting collegians," without specifics concerning whether these contests involved varsity teams, all-star teams, or even pick-up games

== Classic games by team ==
Nº of Appearances	Team	Record	Pct.	First Appearance	Last Appearance
62	Northwestern State	18–41–3	.315	1911	1989
58	Louisiana Tech	39–17–2	.690	1911	1987
26	Wiley	15–9–2 *	.615	1915	1958
24	Centenary	10–11–3	.479	1914	1947
23	LSU	14–9	.609	1913	1936
23	Arkansas	9–14	.391	1913	1936
19	Grambling State	15–3–1	.816	1934	2016
19	Southern	5–13–1 **	.289	1922	2012
8	Bishop	5–3	.625	1916	1948
7	Prairie View A&M	3–4	.429	1959	2013
4	TCU	2–1–1	.625	1933	1939
4	Louisiana–Monroe	1–2–1	.375	1961	1989
4	Louisiana Christian	0–4	.000	1913	2003
3	Louisiana	2–1	.667	1940	1962
3	Arkansas–Pine Bluff	1–2	.333	1948	2002
3	Barksdale Field	1–2	.333	1934	1945
3	Stephen F. Austin	1–2	.333	1926	1928
3	Central Oklahoma	0–3	.000	1924	1926
3	Xavier (LA)	0–3	.000	1942	1944
2	East Texas Baptist	2–0	1.000	2002	2003
2	Jackson State	2–0	1.000	2011	2013
2	North Texas	2–0	1.000	1976	1978
2	Henderson State	1–0–1	.750	1912	1929
2	Texas A&M	1–1	.500	1931	1932
2	Tuskegee	1–1	.500	1946	1949
1	Chattanooga	1–0	1.000	1947	1947
1	DeRidder Army Air Base	1–0	1.000	1942	1942
1	Hendrix	1–0	1.000	1919	1919
1	Jacksonville State	1–0	1.000	1975	1975
1	Mississippi Christian	1–0	1.000	1974	1974
1	Ole Miss	1–0	1.000	1936	1936
1	Selman Army Airfield	1–0	1.000	1945	1945
1	Tennessee Docs	1–0	1.000	1922	1922
1	Texas Military College	1–0	1.000	1934	1934
1	Union (TN)	1–0	1.000	1928	1928
1	Washington University	1–0	1.000	1941	1941
1	Mississippi State	0–0–1	.500	1937	1937
1	Alabama State	0–1	.000	2016	2016
1	Arkansas Baptist	0–1	.000	1929	1929
1	Baylor	0–1	.000	1930	1930
1	Birmingham–Southern	0–1	.000	1927	1927
1	Camp Polk †	0–1	.000	1942	1942
1	Camp Swift	0–1	.000	1945	1945
1	Central Colored High School (LA)	0–1	.000	1921	1921
1	Homer	0–1	.000	1915	1915
1	Louisiana Baptist	0–1	.000	1974	1974
1	Loyola Marymount	0–1	.000	1938	1938
1	Mississippi Valley State	0–1	.000	2001	2001
1	Morris Brown	0–1	.000	1956	1956
1	Randolph Field ‡	0–1	.000	1945	1945
1	Straight	0–1	.000	1916	1916
1	Texas Southern	0–1	.000	2015	2015

Notes: *—record includes 1 win by forfeit; **—record includes 1 loss by forfeit; †—Camp Polk, as a facility that hosted hundreds of thousands of soldiers through the Louisiana Maneuvers, fielded multiple football teams—the 302nd Ordnance Regiment was the team that competed at the 1942 fair; ‡—Randolph Field, as a segregated facility, fielded two football teams: the Caucasian "Ramblers" and the African American "Brown Bombers"—the Brown Bombers were the team that competed at the 1945 fair

== See also ==
- List of black college football classics
- State Fair Classic (Texas)
- Southwestern Athletic Conference (SWAC)
- Sports in Shreveport-Bossier
