= State Fair Classic =

Annual college football game, Grambling State vs. Prairie View A&M

- Stadium: Cotton Bowl in Fair Park
- Location: Dallas, Texas
- Operated: 1925–2019, 2021–present

Sponsors
- Southwest Airlines (1995–2017)

Former names
- State Fair Classic (1945–1989); Al Lipscomb State Fair Classic (1990–1994); Southwest Airlines Al Lipscomb State Fair Classic (1995–1999); Southwest Airlines State Fair Classic (2000–2017)

2026 matchup
- Prairie View A&M 21, Grambling State 14

Locations of Grambling State and Prairie View A&M

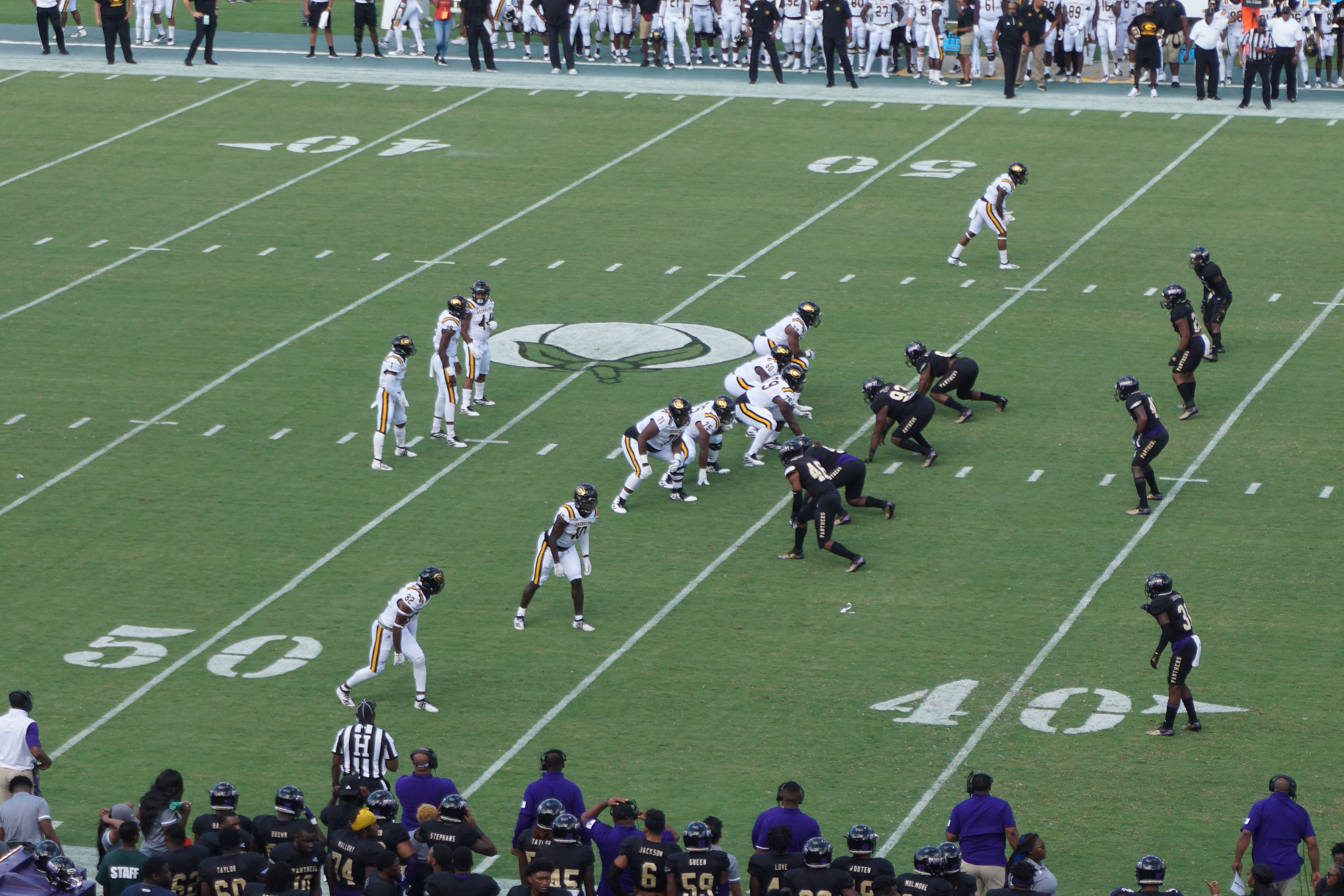
In-game action during the 2019 State Fair Classic

The State Fair Classic (formerly known as the Southwest Airlines State Fair Classic, for sponsorship purposes) is an annual college football game between the Grambling State University Tigers and the Prairie View A&M University Panthers of the Southwestern Athletic Conference (SWAC). The game is played on a neutral site at the Cotton Bowl in Fair Park, Dallas, Texas during the State Fair of Texas. The game often occurs the weekend before the Red River Rivalry game; the Heart of Dallas Classic took place on the first weekend of the 2013 fair, and the State Fair Football Showdown took place on the third weekends of the 2018 and 2019 fairs, featuring SWAC competitors Southern and Texas Southern.

== History ==
=== Background ===
The State Fair Classic, held annually at the Cotton Bowl, began in 1925 featuring the Wiley College Wildcats and Langston University Lions. The first game was played on Monday, October 19, 1925 and resulted in a 0–0 tie with neither team scoring before a crowd of 5,000. Both teams met four consecutive years in Dallas before Prairie View replaced Langston in 1929. The contest always took place on "Negro Day" at the State Fair of Texas and would feature the city's black high school football championship in the afternoon followed by the much-anticipated college game at night. An early concept of "Monday Night Football" could also be attributed to the Texas State Fair Classic and Louisiana's own State Fair Classic, as the contests took place on Monday nights from the 1920s into the 1960s.

Wiley was not the only college to play PVAMU in the State Fair Classic during that era, as the Panthers battled Tennessee State in 1956 and then Texas Southern until 1959.

Bishop College relocated to Dallas in 1961, eventually taking Wiley's place in the annual contest, in the 43rd annual classic in 1967. From that point, Prairie View A&M maintained a presence in the Cotton Bowl with match-ups against Bishop and others over the years before moving its annual rivalry game against Grambling to the Cotton Bowl stadium in 1985 (the Panthers' series with Grambling had also previously been hosted by the State Fair of Louisiana before returning to on-campus venues in 1962).

With the disbanding of the Prairie View football program in 1990, the State Fair Classic featured Grambling and Elizabeth City State. Even though Prairie View brought football back in 1991, that year Grambling played North Carolina A&T, so it was not until 1992 that the classic would see the PVAMU–GSU showdown once again. Since then, this has been the annual match-up held at the State Fair Classic. Upon the revival of this pairing, Grambling won every game until this changed with the 2009 edition—and the game subsequent to this has been very competitive, with Prairie View winning 9 out of 14 contests between then and 2022. At one point, it was even considered "likely" that Grambling would have to be replaced by Langston for the classic's 2015 edition.

=== Other events associated with the classic ===
The classic is accompanied by a pre-game concert featuring a celebrity artist, press conference/fellowship luncheon, pep rallies, alumni fundraising functions, golf tournament, jazz show, comedy show, tailgating, and two battles of the bands featuring both high school and college bands.

=== Economic impact ===
The classic has an annual estimated economic impact of $8.5 million for the City of Dallas. The official 2017 game attendance was 55,231 which solidified the event as one of the largest HBCU football classics in the nation and the largest NCAA Division I Football Championship Subdivision game in Texas. Both schools have a significant portion of their alumni base in the Dallas–Fort Worth metroplex. The game is subsidized by the city of Dallas, with the teams receiving a combined $150,000 each year since 2008 for playing the game. This was raised to $500,000 in 2026 to create more financial parity between the game and the Red River Rivalry between Texas and Oklahoma, which is also played at the Cotton Bowl during the State Fair.

=== Evolving name ===
Early contests appear to have been informally referred to as the Negro Day game to differentiate it from the state fair's other game, the Red River Showdown. Otherwise, the game is documented as having been called the "State Fair Classic" since at least 1945 and was known exclusively as such through the 1989 season. In 1990, it was renamed the Al Lipscomb State Fair Classic after the former Dallas city councilman. After attracting a title sponsor for 1995, it was rechristened as the Southwest Airlines Al Lipscomb State Fair Classic. Starting with the 2000 season, Lipscomb's name was no longer associated with the game, because he had been convicted of 65 counts of conspiracy and bribery. Promotions with Southwest Airlines listed as the title sponsor ceased after the 2017 game.

== Game results ==
Date	Winning team		Losing team		Location
October 19, 1925	Langston	0	Wiley	0	Dallas, TX
October 19, 1926	Langston	13	Wiley	0	Dallas, TX
October 17, 1927	Langston	27	Wiley	0	Dallas, TX
October 15, 1928	Langston	7	Wiley	7	Dallas, TX
October 21, 1929	Prairie View	0	Wiley	0	Dallas, TX
October 20, 1930	Wiley	17	Prairie View	13	Dallas, TX
October 19, 1931	Prairie View	20	Wiley	0	Dallas, TX
October 17, 1932	Wiley	13	Prairie View	0	Dallas, TX
October 16, 1933	Wiley	6	Prairie View	0	Dallas, TX
October 15, 1934	Prairie View	13	Wiley	12	Dallas, TX
October 19, 1935	Prairie View	0	Wiley	0	Dallas, TX
October 19, 1936	Wiley	7	Prairie View	0	Dallas, TX
October 18, 1937	Prairie View	13	Wiley	0	Dallas, TX
October 17, 1938	Prairie View	6	Wiley	6	Dallas, TX
October 16, 1939	Wiley	13	Prairie View	6	Dallas, TX
October 14, 1940	Prairie View	18	Wiley	0	Dallas, TX
October 13, 1941	Prairie View	32	Wiley	7	Dallas, TX
October 19, 1942	Prairie View	6	Wiley	0	Dallas, TX
October 16, 1943	Prairie View	0	Wiley	0	Dallas, TX
October 14, 1944	Wiley	28	Prairie View	0	Dallas, TX
October 15, 1945	Wiley	35	Prairie View	7	Dallas, TX
October 14, 1946	Wiley	19	Prairie View	0	Dallas, TX
October 13, 1947	Prairie View A&M	12	Wiley	6	Dallas, TX
October 18, 1948	Prairie View A&M	19	Wiley	0	Dallas, TX
October 17, 1949	Prairie View A&M	27	Wiley	7	Dallas, TX
October 16, 1950	Prairie View A&M	47	Wiley	0	Dallas, TX
October 13, 1951	Prairie View A&M	38	Wiley	0	Dallas, TX
October 13, 1952	Prairie View A&M	53	Wiley	0	Dallas, TX
October 19, 1953	Prairie View A&M	32	Wiley	0	Dallas, TX
October 18, 1954	Prairie View A&M	19	Wiley	6	Dallas, TX
October 17, 1955	Prairie View A&M	34	Wiley	7	Dallas, TX
October 15, 1956	Tennessee State	45	Prairie View A&M	0	Dallas, TX
October 14, 1957	Prairie View A&M	7	Texas Southern	6	Dallas, TX
October 13, 1958	Prairie View A&M	26	Texas Southern	19	Dallas, TX
October 19, 1959	Prairie View A&M	34	Texas Southern	15	Dallas, TX
October 17, 1960	Prairie View A&M	36	Wiley	15	Dallas, TX
October 16, 1961	Prairie View A&M	48	Wiley	13	Dallas, TX
October 15, 1962	Prairie View A&M	26	Wiley	17	Dallas, TX
October 14, 1963	Prairie View A&M	27	Wiley	10	Dallas, TX
October 19, 1964	Prairie View A&M	39	Wiley	13	Dallas, TX
October 18, 1965	Prairie View A&M	16	Wiley	7	Dallas, TX
October 17, 1966	Prairie View A&M	21	Wiley	0	Dallas, TX
October 16, 1967	Prairie View A&M	31	Bishop	7	Dallas, TX
October 19, 1968	Bishop	13	Prairie View A&M	10	Dallas, TX
October 18, 1969	Bishop	36	Prairie View A&M	21	Dallas, TX
October 24, 1970	Prairie View A&M	29	Bishop	26	Dallas, TX
October 16, 1971	Tennessee State	42	Prairie View A&M	20	Dallas, TX
October 21, 1972	Prairie View A&M	14	Bishop	10	Dallas, TX
October 20, 1973	Prairie View A&M	25	Bishop	3	Dallas, TX
October 26, 1974	Bishop	21	Prairie View A&M	14	Dallas, TX
October 25, 1975	Prairie View A&M	14	Bishop	13	Dallas, TX
October 23, 1976	Prairie View A&M	22	Bishop	14	Dallas, TX
October 22, 1977	Prairie View A&M	39	Bishop	7	Dallas, TX
October 21, 1978	Bishop	35	Prairie View A&M	34	Dallas, TX
October 6, 1979	Bishop	33	Prairie View A&M	16	Dallas, TX
October 11, 1980	Bishop	12	Prairie View A&M	0	Dallas, TX
October 10, 1981	Bishop	40	Prairie View A&M	0	Dallas, TX
October 9, 1982	Prairie View A&M	24	Bishop	13	Dallas, TX
October 8, 1983	Bishop	32	Prairie View A&M	20	Prairie View, TX
October 6, 1984	Bishop	34	Prairie View A&M	8	Dallas, TX
October 5, 1985	Grambling State	27	Prairie View A&M	7	Dallas, TX
October 4, 1986	Prairie View A&M	24	Grambling State	19	Dallas, TX
October 3, 1987	Grambling State	28	Prairie View A&M	7	Dallas, TX
October 1, 1988	Grambling State	40	Prairie View A&M	14	Dallas, TX
September 30, 1989	Grambling State	49	Prairie View A&M	0	Dallas, TX
September 29, 1990	Grambling State	67	Elizabeth City State	3	Dallas, TX
September 28, 1991	North Carolina A&T	28	Grambling State	12	Dallas, TX
October 3, 1992	Grambling State	63	Prairie View A&M	3	Dallas, TX
October 2, 1993	Grambling State	49	Prairie View A&M	0	Dallas, TX
October 1, 1994	Grambling State	66	Prairie View A&M	0	Dallas, TX
September 30, 1995	Grambling State	64	Prairie View A&M	0	Dallas, TX
September 28, 1996	Grambling State	54	Prairie View A&M	12	Dallas, TX
October 4, 1997	Grambling State	33	Prairie View A&M	6	Dallas, TX
October 3, 1998	Grambling State	55	Prairie View A&M	40	Dallas, TX
October 2, 1999	Grambling State	47	Prairie View A&M	19	Dallas, TX
September 30, 2000	Grambling State	47	Prairie View A&M	7	Dallas, TX
September 29, 2001	Grambling State	40	Prairie View A&M	6	Dallas, TX
October 5, 2002	Grambling State	35	Prairie View A&M	13	Dallas, TX
October 4, 2003	Grambling State	65	Prairie View A&M	7	Dallas, TX
October 2, 2004	Grambling State	53	Prairie View A&M	32	Dallas, TX
October 1, 2005	Grambling State	50	Prairie View A&M	7	Dallas, TX
September 30, 2006	Grambling State	53	Prairie View A&M	7	Dallas, TX
September 29, 2007	Grambling State	17	Prairie View A&M	14	Dallas, TX
October 4, 2008	Grambling State	40	Prairie View A&M	16	Dallas, TX
October 3, 2009	Prairie View A&M	35	Grambling State	32	Dallas, TX
September 25, 2010	Grambling State	34	Prairie View A&M	17	Dallas, TX
October 1, 2011	Prairie View A&M	31	Grambling State	23	Dallas, TX
October 6, 2012	Prairie View A&M	31	Grambling State	14	Dallas, TX
October 5, 2013	Prairie View A&M	31	Grambling State	3	Dallas, TX
September 27, 2014	Grambling State	26	Prairie View A&M	20	Dallas, TX
September 26, 2015	Grambling State	70	Prairie View A&M	54	Dallas, TX
October 1, 2016	Grambling State	36	Prairie View A&M	16	Dallas, TX
October 7, 2017	Grambling State	34	Prairie View A&M	21	Dallas, TX
September 29, 2018	Prairie View A&M	22	Grambling State	16	Dallas, TX
September 28, 2019	Prairie View A&M	42	Grambling State	36	Dallas, TX
March 13, 2021	Prairie View A&M	17	Grambling State	10	Arlington, TX
September 25, 2021	Prairie View A&M	24	Grambling State	10	Dallas, TX
October 1, 2022	Prairie View A&M	34	Grambling State	14	Dallas, TX
September 30, 2023	Grambling State	35	Prairie View A&M	20	Dallas, TX
September 28, 2024	Prairie View A&M	36^{5OT}	Grambling State	34	Dallas, TX
September 27, 2025	Prairie View A&M	28	Grambling State	13	Dallas, TX
September 26, 2026	Prairie View A&M	21	Grambling State	14	Dallas, TX

== See also ==
- History of African Americans in Dallas-Ft. Worth
- Labor Day Classic
- Red River State Fair Classic
- List of black college football classics
- Sports in Dallas
