= Independence Stadium (Shreveport) =

Stadium owned by the city of Shreveport, Louisiana

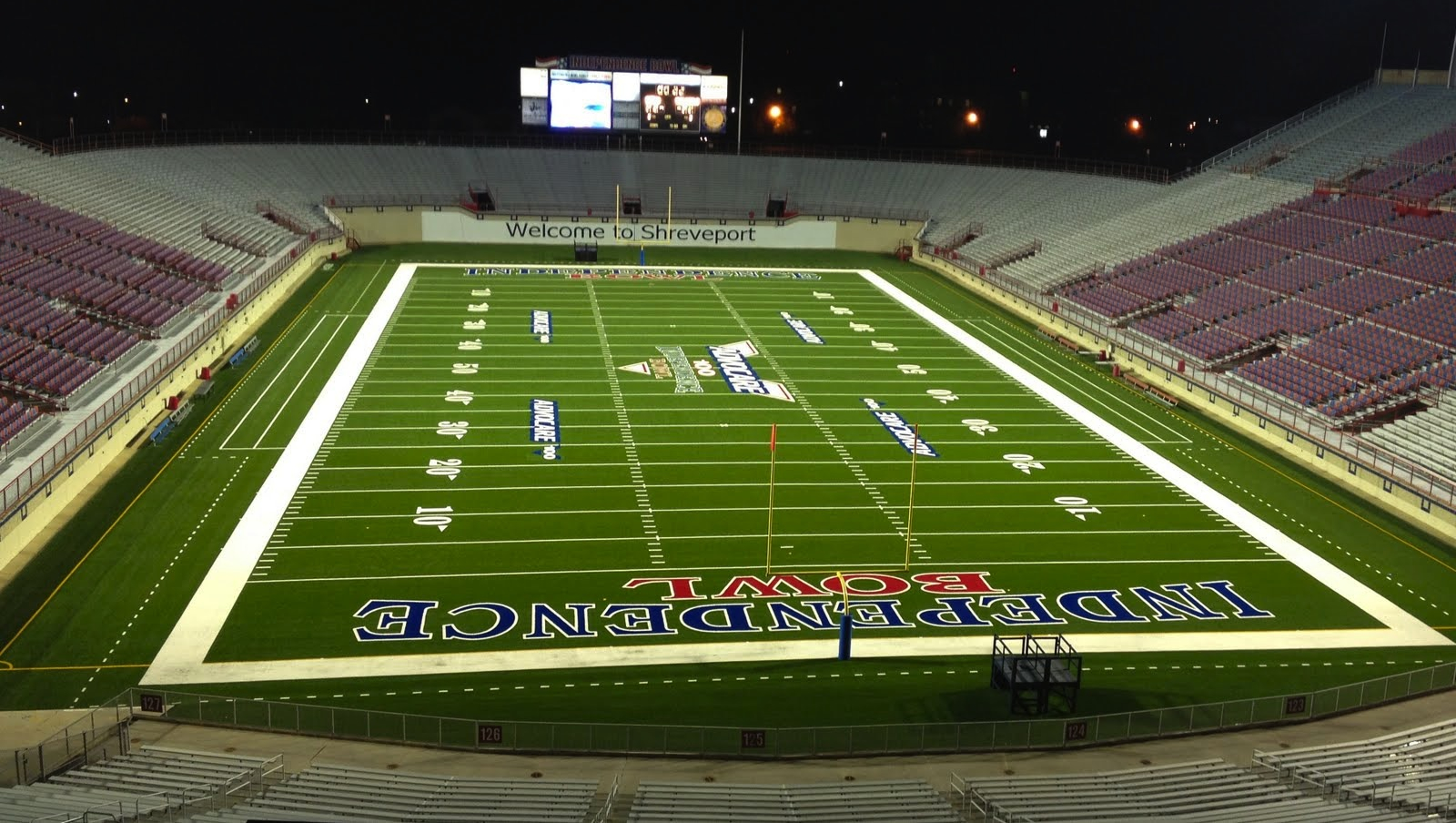
- The stadium from the South end zone, December 2011

- Location in Louisiana Location in the United States
- Former names: State Fair Stadium (1924–1981)
- Address: 3301 Pershing Boulevard
- Location: Shreveport, Louisiana, U.S.
- Coordinates: 32°28′32″N 93°47′31″W
- Owner: City of Shreveport
- Capacity: 50,000
- Surface: FieldTurf

Construction
- Opened: 1924
- Renovated: 1930, 1934, 1950, 1973, late 1990s, 2001, 2005, 2008, 2009, 2014
- Architect: Samuel G. Weiner

Tenants
- Red River State Fair Classic (NCAA) (1924–89, 1999, 2001–2003, 2010–13, 2015–16); Louisiana Tech Bulldogs (1928–2012; alternate); Shreveport Steamer (WFL) (1974–75); Northwestern State Demons (NCAA) (1975); Independence Bowl (NCAA) (1976–present); Shreveport Steamer (AFA) (1978–81); Shreveport Americans (AFA) (1982–83); Shreveport Pirates (CFL) (1994–95); Shreveport Knights (RFL) (1999); Shreveport Rafters FC (NPSL) (2018)

Independence Stadium is an outdoor football stadium in Shreveport, Louisiana. Formerly known as State Fair Stadium and Fairgrounds Stadium, the municipally owned stadium is the site of the annual Independence Bowl post-season college football game, first held in 1976 as the Bicentennial Bowl. It was also the home venue of the Shreveport Steamer of the short-lived World Football League from 1974 to 1975 and the Shreveport Pirates of the Canadian Football League from 1994 to 1995.

The stadium is also host to numerous high school football games and soccer matches, since many schools in Shreveport lack an on-campus facility. Independence Stadium also hosted the LHSAA state football championship games in 2005 after the Louisiana Superdome suffered heavy damage from Hurricane Katrina. The stadium also hosts concerts and other events.

== History ==
The stadium first opened in 1924, and hosted the annual Arkansas–LSU football rivalry as a neutral site that year. The game featured a silver football trophy as part of the dedication ceremonies for the new stadium. It would host the game again several times until 1936.

From 1978 to 1983, Independence Stadium was home to the city's two teams in the American Football Association, the Shreveport Steamer (with naming rights purchased from the defunct WFL team) and the Shreveport Americans. It hosted the AFA's first championship game, 1978's American Bowl I, which the Steamer won 17–14 over the San Antonio Charros.

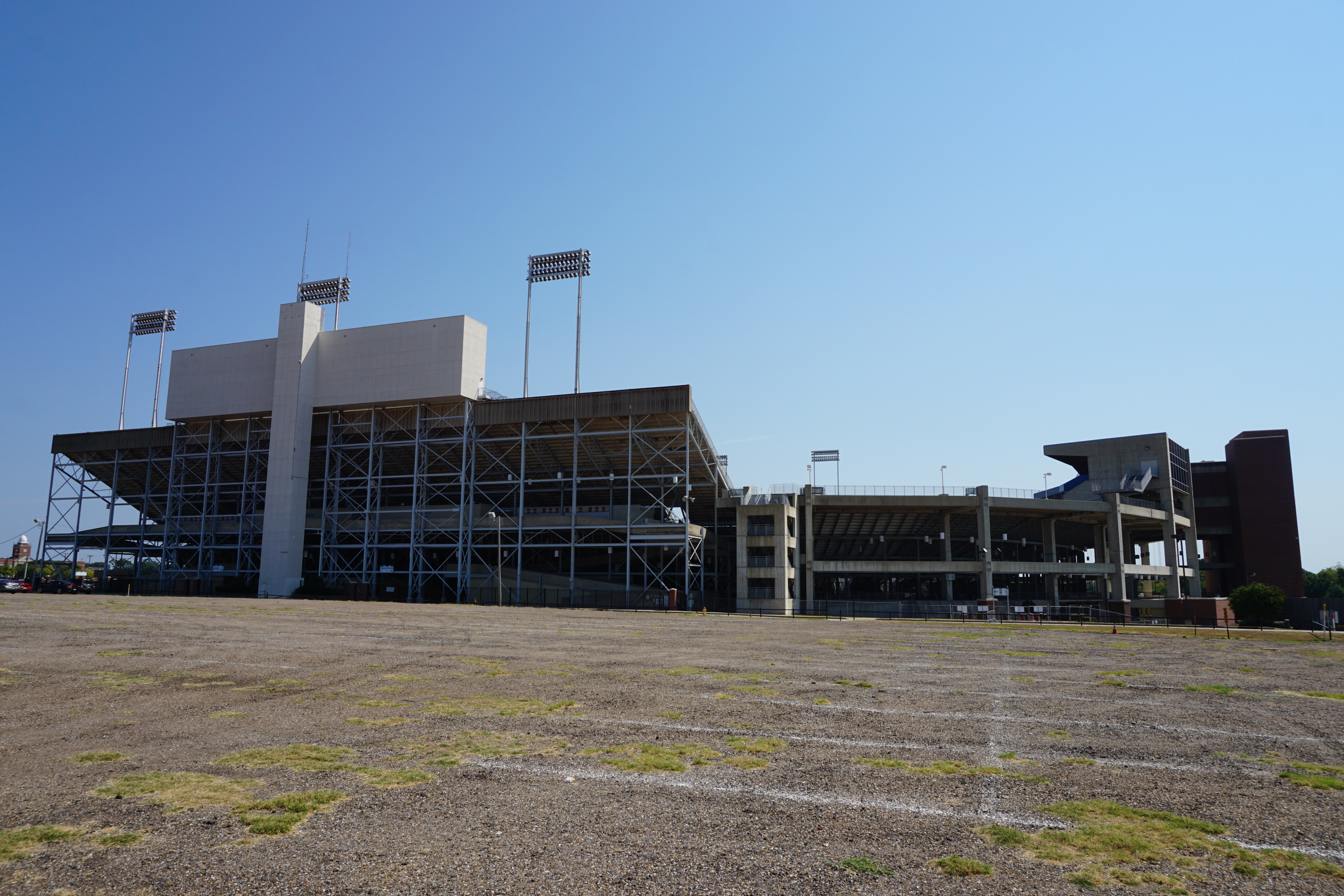
The exterior of Independence Stadium in 2015

In 2001, Independence Stadium hosted the inaugural year of the annual Port City Classic—an NCAA college football competition featuring Southern University of Baton Rouge—in an effort to revive the old State Fair Classic game. The classic spun-off separately from the fair the following year and became an early September game. Eventually it also hosted a contest between Louisiana Tech University of Ruston and Grambling State University of Grambling.

Independence Stadium was considered as a possible playing site for the New Orleans Saints during the 2005 NFL season due to Hurricane Katrina, but Shreveport eventually lost out to the Alamodome in San Antonio, Texas, and Louisiana State University's Tiger Stadium in Baton Rouge. However, Independence Stadium eventually was chosen to host the Saints' first preseason home game for the 2006 season while the Louisiana Superdome prepared for its grand re-opening. FieldTurf was installed as the stadium's playing surface in 2010. It had been natural grass before that from the opening of the stadium.

In 2010, a Texas University Interscholastic League playoff game was played featuring Mesquite Horn high school and the technical host Longview. Longview won, 28–14. The first time Texas teams met in Louisiana for a playoff game was in 2006 when Texas High School from Texarkana topped Dallas Highland Park with quarterback Ryan Mallett. That game also was hosted at Independence Stadium.

== See also ==
- List of soccer stadiums in the United States
