= Fountain City Classic =

American college football rivalry

- Sport: Football
- Teams: Albany State Golden Rams; Fort Valley State Wildcats
- First meeting: 1924; Fort Valley State, 21–0
- Latest meeting: November 7, 2026; Albany State, 49–0
- Next meeting: 2027

Statistics
- Total meetings: 92
- All-time series: Fort Valley State leads, 45–43–4
- Current win streak: Albany State, 4 (2023–present)

Locations in Georgia

The Fountain City Classic is an annual American football game featuring Fort Valley State University and Albany State University, two of Georgia's historically black universities. The game is played at A. J. McClung Memorial Stadium in Columbus, Georgia.

== History ==
Albany State and Fort Valley State first played in 1924, and the rivalry game officially became known as the Fountain City Classic in 1990. FVSU leads the series 45–43–4.

The first postwar meeting of the two schools was in 1945, when FVSU beat ASU, 27–21. The two schools did not play each other in 1946 and 1947. While the rivalry between the two teams spans more than half a century, FCC officials moved the game to Columbus in 1990 to attract more corporate support.

2010 Fountain City Classic

== Game results ==
Albany State victories	Fort Valley State victories	Tie games

No.	Date	Location	Winner	Score
1	1924	Unknown	Fort Valley State	21–0
2	1925	Unknown	Fort Valley State	53–0
3	1927	Unknown	Fort Valley State	27–0
4	1930	Unknown	Tie	6–6
5	1932	Unknown	Fort Valley State	12–0
6	1933	Unknown	Fort Valley State	29–0
7	1934	Unknown	Fort Valley State	30–0
8	1935	Fort Valley, GA	Fort Valley State	37–7
9	1936	Unknown	Fort Valley State	13–0
10	1939	Unknown	Albany State	33–7
11	1940	Albany, GA	Albany State	33–0
12	1945	Unknown	Fort Valley State	27–21
13	1945	Unknown	Fort Valley State	18–0
14	1947	Albany, GA	Fort Valley State	26–6
15	1948	Fort Valley, GA	Fort Valley State	21–0
16	1949	Albany, GA	Fort Valley State	19–7
17	1950	Fort Valley, GA	Fort Valley State	26–18
18	1951	Albany, GA	Fort Valley State	12–7
19	1952	Fort Valley, GA	Fort Valley State	14–0
20	1953	Albany, GA	Fort Valley State	8–0
21	1954	Fort Valley, GA	Fort Valley State	26–0
22	1955	Albany, GA	Fort Valley State	20–0
23	1956	Fort Valley, GA	Fort Valley State	39–7
24	1957	Albany, GA	Fort Valley State	26–7
25	1958	Fort Valley, GA	Fort Valley State	16–12
26	1959	Albany, GA	Fort Valley State	14–3
27	1960	Fort Valley, GA	Albany State	12–0
28	1961	Albany, GA	Albany State	41–0
29	1962	Fort Valley, GA	Fort Valley State	22–14
30	1963	Albany, GA	Fort Valley State	20–0
31	1964	Fort Valley, GA	Fort Valley State	39–6
32	1965	Albany, GA	Albany State	28–26
33	1966	Fort Valley, GA	Fort Valley State	20–0
34	1967	Albany, GA	Albany State	14–13
35	1968	Fort Valley, GA	Fort Valley State	35–22
36	1969	Albany, GA	Albany State	19–17
37	1970	Fort Valley, GA	Fort Valley State	48–20
38	1971	Albany, GA	Tie	14–14
39	1972	Fort Valley, GA	Albany State	30–14
40	1973	Albany, GA	Tie	19–19
41	1974	Fort Valley, GA	Fort Valley State	26–23
42	1975	Albany, GA	Fort Valley State	1–0
43	1976	Fort Valley, GA	Albany State	16–7
44	1977	Albany, GA	Albany State	26–0
45	1978	Fort Valley, GA	Tie	14–14
46	1979	Albany, GA	Fort Valley State	29–24
47	1980	Fort Valley, GA	Albany State	21–12

No.	Date	Location	Winner	Score
48	1981	Albany, GA	Fort Valley State	27–19
49	1982	Fort Valley, GA	Fort Valley State	37–0
50	1983	Albany, GA	Fort Valley State	21–7
51	1984	Fort Valley, GA	Fort Valley State	42–24
52	1985	Albany, GA	Albany State	23–3
53	1986	Fort Valley, GA	Albany State	20–7
54	1987	Albany, GA	Albany State	17–14
55	1988	Fort Valley, GA	Albany State	28–14
56	1989	Albany, GA	Fort Valley State	19–13
57	1990	Columbus, GA	Albany State	35–0
58	1991	Columbus, GA	Fort Valley State	22–20
59	1992	Fort Valley, GA	Albany State	29–10
60	1993	Fort Valley, GA	Albany State	14–0
61	1994	Columbus, GA	Albany State	47–14
62	1995	Columbus, GA	Fort Valley State	16–12
63	1996	Columbus, GA	Albany State	21–7
64	1997	Columbus, GA	Albany State	12–7
65	1998	Columbus, GA	Fort Valley State	17–14
66	1999	Columbus, GA	Albany State	24–21
67	2000	Columbus, GA	Albany State	21–14
68	2001	Columbus, GA	Fort Valley State	45–7
69	2002	Columbus, GA	Albany State	31–7
70	2003	Columbus, GA	Albany State	27–17
71	2004	Columbus, GA	Albany State	20–19
72	2005	Columbus, GA	Albany State	41–23
73	2006	Columbus, GA	Albany State	21–3
74	2007	Columbus, GA	Albany State	32–27
75	2008	Columbus, GA	Albany State	31–7
76	2009	Columbus, GA	Fort Valley State	35–13
77	2010	Columbus, GA	Albany State	12–7
78	2011	Columbus, GA	Albany State	38–29
79	2012	Columbus, GA	Fort Valley State	38–20
80	2013	Columbus, GA	Albany State	19–10
81	2014	Columbus, GA	Albany State	32–21
82	2015	Columbus, GA	Albany State	21–17
83	2016	Columbus, GA	Fort Valley State	21–17
84	2017	Columbus, GA	Albany State	34–9
85	2018	Columbus, GA	Albany State	40–6
86	2019	Columbus, GA	Albany State	42–6
87	2021	Columbus, GA	Albany State	57–0
88	2022	Columbus, GA	Fort Valley State	31–21
89	2023	Columbus, GA	Albany State	13–7
90	2024	Columbus, GA	Albany State	20–15
91	2025	Columbus, GA	Albany State	48–3
92	2026	Columbus, GA	Albany State	49–0
Series: Fort Valley State leads 45–43–4

== See also ==
- List of NCAA college football rivalry games
- List of black college football classics
