= Al Lipscomb =

Dallas city council member

Albert Louis “Al” Lipscomb
- Born: June 15, 1925; Dallas, Texas
- Died: June 18, 2011 (aged 86); Dallas
- Occupations: Fourteen-year Dallas City Council member, civil rights advocate
- Spouse: Lovie Lipscomb (m. 1957)
- Children: Eight

Albert Louis "Al" Lipscomb (15 June 1925 – 18 June 2011) was a seven-term Dallas City Council member and a longtime civil rights advocate. He was the lead plaintiff in a lawsuit in the 1970s that successfully challenged Dallas's system of electing every council member citywide, forcing the city to change to a mostly single-member district system.

D Magazine called Lipscomb, the first black person to run for mayor, "the Jackie Robinson of Dallas city government". Several African-American officials credited him with opening doors for them. He won eight council elections and was one of the longest-serving council members in Dallas history at 14 years.

In 2000, Lipscomb was convicted of federal bribery charges stemming from what prosecutors said were improper payments from a taxi cab company owner. The conviction was overturned on appeal in 2002.

== Dealing with discrimination at early age ==
Lipscomb was born in southeast Dallas and grew up in a home built by family members. In 2002, he described how, as a child, he often witnessed his grandfather having to get off the sidewalk and doff his hat when a white person passed. Lipscomb was also the frequent target of racially motivated violence by other children.

Lipscomb said these events helped mold him into a civil rights advocate. His mother, Lucille Jeffrey, was an organizer for Lyndon Johnson's War on Poverty who also greatly influenced him.

Lipscomb graduated from Lincoln High, working part-time as a busboy at the Adolphus Hotel during high school. He joined the U.S. Army Air Forces in 1943 during World War II, serving in California with the military police. After being discharged, he remained in California and said he "got involved in drugs". He was arrested for selling heroin and incarcerated for ten months of a one-year prison sentence. He said he had planned to return to Dallas sooner after being discharged from the Army but got caught up in a "nightmare".

In the early 1950s, Lipscomb moved back to Dallas, where he waited tables in restaurants. He met his future wife, Lovie Lipscomb, when they worked for the same hotel. He eventually became the headwaiter at the executive dining room of First National Bank. Among the restaurant's patrons was the oilman H. L. Hunt, who brought his lunch in a sack and requested only water and a phone. Lipscomb said Hunt sometimes worked on a novel there and tipped the waiters well.

== Joining the War on Poverty ==
In 1966, Lipscomb became a neighborhood organizer for the Dallas Community Action Agency, a nonprofit organization founded to work in the War on Poverty. He had previously volunteered on some projects to challenge segregation launched by the Student Nonviolent Coordinating Committee, attending protests to open drugstore counters and other facilities to black people. He organized with Martin Luther King Jr.'s Southern Christian Leadership Conference and co-founded the Dallas chapter. He founded a clearinghouse for community problems, the South Dallas Information Center, and said he was the first person to be arrested and thrown out of Dallas City Hall.

A major cause of the time was stopping developers from buying out black homeowners at unfair prices for a proposed expansion of the State Fair of Texas in Fair Park. In 1969, Lipscomb, the SCLC's Peter Johnson and other community activists organized out of Mount Olive Lutheran Church. They negotiated with then-Mayor J. Erik Jonsson for more favorable home buyout prices after threatening to stage a large demonstration during the nationally televised Cotton Bowl Parade.

While trying to get a meeting with the mayor, the group endured bomb threats to the point that the police chief went to the church basement where the activists prepared for the protest and told them it was unsafe to stay there. Johnson said he drew a line across the church basement floor and told everyone present that they were free to leave with no hard feelings. Anyone willing to brave the threats was asked to cross the line. "The first person to walk across that line was Albert Lipscomb", Johnson said. The mayor soon agreed to the meeting.

== Suing the city, winning council elections ==
In 1971, Lipscomb became Dallas's first black candidate for mayor, finishing third in a field of seven. He ran for city council and other offices several more times before he was elected to the Dallas City Council in 1984.

Also in 1971, Lipscomb became the lead plaintiff in a lawsuit to challenge the City Council's method of electing members all at large. He and others argued in court that the system effectively discriminated against minorities and had resulted in very few nonwhite council members. In January 1975, U.S. District Judge Eldon Brooks Mahon found that the all at-large system was unconstitutional because it was "intentionally adopted and maintained to dilute the voting strength of African-Americans…. When all members of the City Council are elected at-large, the significance of this pattern of blacks carrying their own areas and yet losing on a citywide basis is that black voters of Dallas do have less opportunity than do the white voters to elect candidates of their choice."

Lipscomb won several more elections and became mayor pro tem in 1991. He left the council in 1993 due to a term-limit rule. In 1995, he was reelected to the council and remained until he resigned in 2000 amid a scandal over alleged improper payments by a taxicab company owner.

Economic development in South Dallas was among the issues Lipscomb worked on during his council tenure. He co-sponsored a community-based crime prevention program and was outspoken about police shootings of minorities and minority hiring policies.

== Legal issues over alleged improper payments ==
In 1999, Lipscomb and taxicab company owner Floyd Richards were indicted on federal bribery charges. Richards was accused of making about $94,000 in illegal payments to Lipscomb and a son-in-law, Roderick L. Dudley, from 1984 to 1993. The indictment alleged that Lipscomb then strongly lobbied to approve city ordinances that aided Richards's businesses, effectively undercutting smaller competitors.

Lipscomb and his attorneys denied the charges. Richards's attorney Reed Prospere also denied that Richards paid Lipscomb "bribes with intent to improperly influence or reward" him and said any payments were considered "aid and assistance" to Lipscomb. "The list of people and companies that have provided aid and assistance to Mr. Lipscomb would read like a who's who of Dallas", Prospere said.

=== Low council pay behind reason for payments, Lipscomb supporters say ===
Before voters raised Dallas City Council members' salaries to $37,500 in 2001 and $60,000 in 2014, they were paid only $50 per meeting. Critics said the low pay was designed to ensure that only wealthy business people or their spouses—essentially volunteers who had their companies or spouses pay for what became a full-time job in a growing major city—could serve on the council. Proponents argued that the council-manager form was implemented in Dallas in 1931 to curb corruption in city government and have a professional manager run the city as a business with the council as part-time board of directors.

But the council-manager form led to excesses, such as charges that the mayor and council voted on contracts and issues that benefited their companies. In addition, lower-income citizens, such as Lipscomb, who had families to support had to make substantial sacrifices if they wanted council representation. In trying to make ends meet while advocating for issues important to lower-income people, some accepted payments from wealthier citizens. Sometimes payments were made in cash and sometimes they were diverted through a business they or a family member ran. Lipscomb said the payments he accepted came with "no strings attached". Dallas County Commissioner John Wiley Price, a longtime ally Lipscomb had mentored, said, "Most civil rights leaders in this city have probably always had beneficiaries in the white business community who could not afford to be identified. That comes all the way from the era of the Underground Railroad. But if the question is was Al Lipscomb corrupted by that money, then the answer is definitely no."

In taking money from Richards, Lipscomb "took actions that hurt Mr. Richards' rivals", federal prosecutor Paul Coggins said. For instance, Lipscomb voted to substantially increase insurance requirements in 1996, which smaller competitors of Richards's companies said would force them out of business. Mayor Ron Kirk said Lipscomb was "a decent and fine human being who ought to be remembered for his efforts to democratize the political process" but that he "may be guilty of errors in judgment and not having exercised the best business protocol." A vice president of Richards's company said the payments to Lipscomb were little different from the salary Kirk earned from "one of the largest law firms in the city that have clients who deal with the city every day".

The case was assigned to U.S. District Judge Joe Kendall, who moved the venue to Amarillo, saying he thought Lipscomb's notoriety in Dallas and the case's publicity would preclude a fair trial there. Prosecutors made a deal with Richards to testify against Lipscomb and plead guilty to conspiring to commit bribery in return for a one-month prison sentence and nine months of home confinement. Lipscomb refused a plea deal, and the case went before an all-white jury in Amarillo.

In the trial, political consultant Linda Pavlik said she worked with Richards to give money to Dudley, who loaned funds to support Lipscomb's 1995 council race. She said Richards once told her that he "bought and paid for" Lipscomb and another council member, even calling them the "n-word". Richards testified that the money he gave Lipscomb was not contingent on him voting a certain way, but also said: "I'm paying a man a thousand dollars a month. He's going to vote for me."

The jury found Lipscomb guilty of 65 counts of bribery and conspiracy. He was forced to resign from the council and Kendall sentenced him to 41 months of home confinement. But in 2002, a federal appeals court reversed the verdict, ruling that Kendall erred in moving the trial to Amarillo without citing evidence that no unbiased jurors could be found in the Dallas area.

=== Lipscomb feuds with Dallas mayor ===
While in home confinement, Lipscomb said he was reading the Bible and trying not to hold animosity toward anyone. But he strongly criticized journalist and politician Laura Miller, who had written for years about the alleged improper payments from white businesspeople to Lipscomb and other black leaders. In 1996, Miller wrote about problems with a chemical business that Lipscomb helped run and that he allegedly voted as a council member for projects backed by his customers and benefactors. She called him "clueless when it comes to some things—integrity and ethics are good examples."

Lipscomb voluntarily turned over bank records and other revealing business documents to Miller, who detailed numerous payments and votes in an 11,000-word article. "For too long now, Lipscomb, the people who cynically control him, and the media who overlook it all, have made a complete mockery of our local political system", Miller wrote. Her reporting was cited in the federal case against Lipscomb.

Miller ran for mayor of Dallas in 2001. Lipscomb told a reporter, "If Hitler, Satan, and Miller were running, I wouldn't vote for her". Council member James Fantroy, who defeated Lipscomb in a 2005 race, said that many African Americans blamed Miller for black leaders' legal troubles. In 2003, Miller told a television reporter about a closed-door council session in which she objected to a Fantroy family company handling security for a proposed housing development, even though Fantroy recused himself from proceedings. While the city attorney said his recusal resolved any conflict, Miller still gave details to a reporter, whose broadcast reportedly caught local FBI agents' attention. Investigations ensued, and Fantroy was convicted of embezzling money and council member Don Hill convicted of bribery.

Some black leaders and their lawyers charged that Miller herself took improper payments as a council member and mayor, including from the same housing developer who accused Hill of improper payments. Federal authorities said the payments to Miller were documented campaign contributions, while Hill received improper funds.

== Personal ==
Lipscomb was a longtime member of St. Mark's Baptist Church in southeast Dallas, where he was a deacon and sang in the choir. He was a board member and leader of numerous community organizations, including the SCLC, the Martin Luther King Jr. Community Center, Dallas Legal Services, and the Progressive Voters League.

Lipscomb and his wife, Lovie, had eight children, four from Lovie's previous marriage.

== Honors ==
The Texas Peace Officers Association, a black police officer organization, named Lipscomb "Man of the Year" in 1980. D Magazine listed him as one of "50 People Who Made Dallas" in a 1991 feature, calling him "the Jackie Robinson of Dallas city government", and writing that he was "capable of passionate argument, unintentionally comic rhetoric and honeyed homilies from the Bible, but few doubt his commitment to social justice".

Lipscomb also received honors from the Texas Legislative Black Caucus, the Martin Luther King Jr. Community Center, and a civil rights center. In 2015, the city of Dallas renamed part of Grand Avenue "Al Lipscomb Way". The State Fair Classic annual football game was named after him from 1990 to 2000.

== Death and legacy ==
After battling diabetes and other health problems, Lipscomb died in 2011, aged 86. Longtime friend Eddie Sewell called him his hero. "He was my Malcolm X. He was my Nelson Mandela. He was my Martin Luther King." Fellow council member Diane Ragsdale said Lipscomb "was one of the strong warriors and soldiers early on, and sometimes he was out there by himself…. You must have people like Al Lipscomb to push people forward." Lovie Lipscomb died in 2017.
