= A. J. McClung Memorial Stadium =

Stadium in Columbus, Georgia

Coordinates: 32.452°N 84.985°W

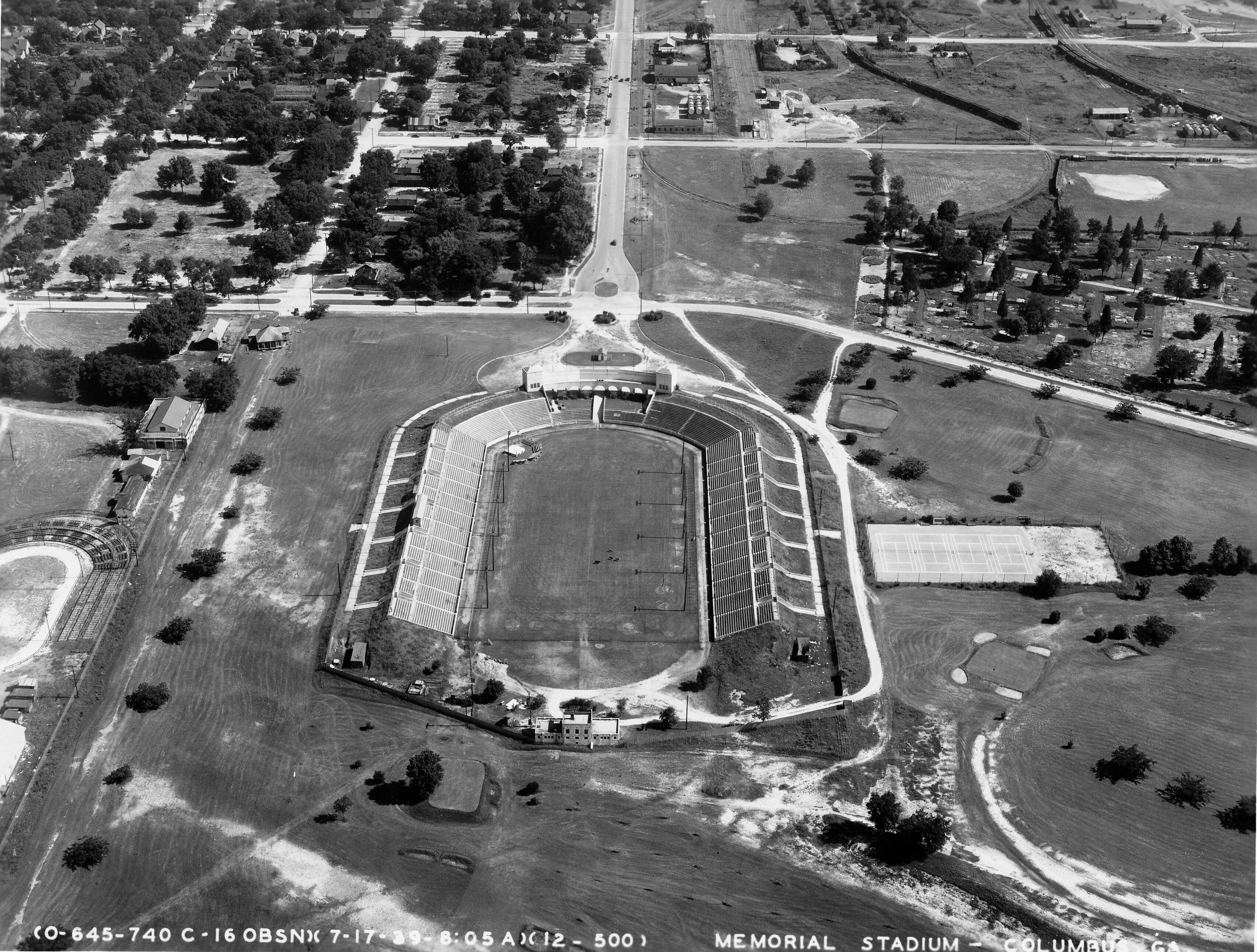
Stadium in 1939

A. J. McClung Memorial Stadium is a 15,000-seat sports stadium located in Columbus, Georgia. It was the site of football games between the Georgia Bulldogs and the Auburn Tigers from 1916 until 1958 (the Deep South's Oldest Rivalry). The stadium now hosts the Fort Valley State–Albany State (Fountain City Classic) and the Tuskegee–Morehouse rivalry games, as well local youth football and soccer and high school football games.

The stadium was named for A. J. McClung, a former mayor of Columbus, and civil rights leader.

== Gallery ==
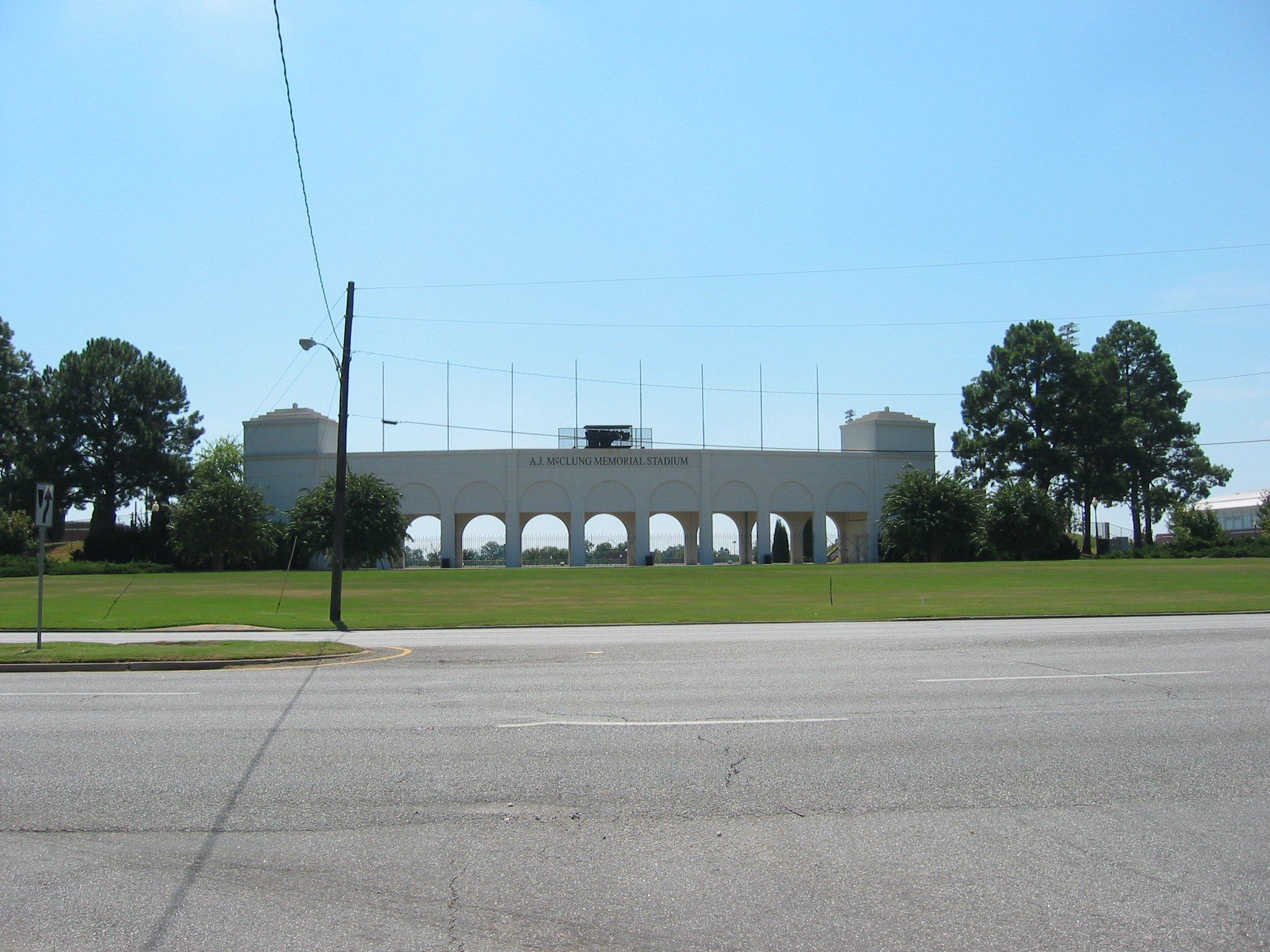
A. J. McClung Memorial Stadium

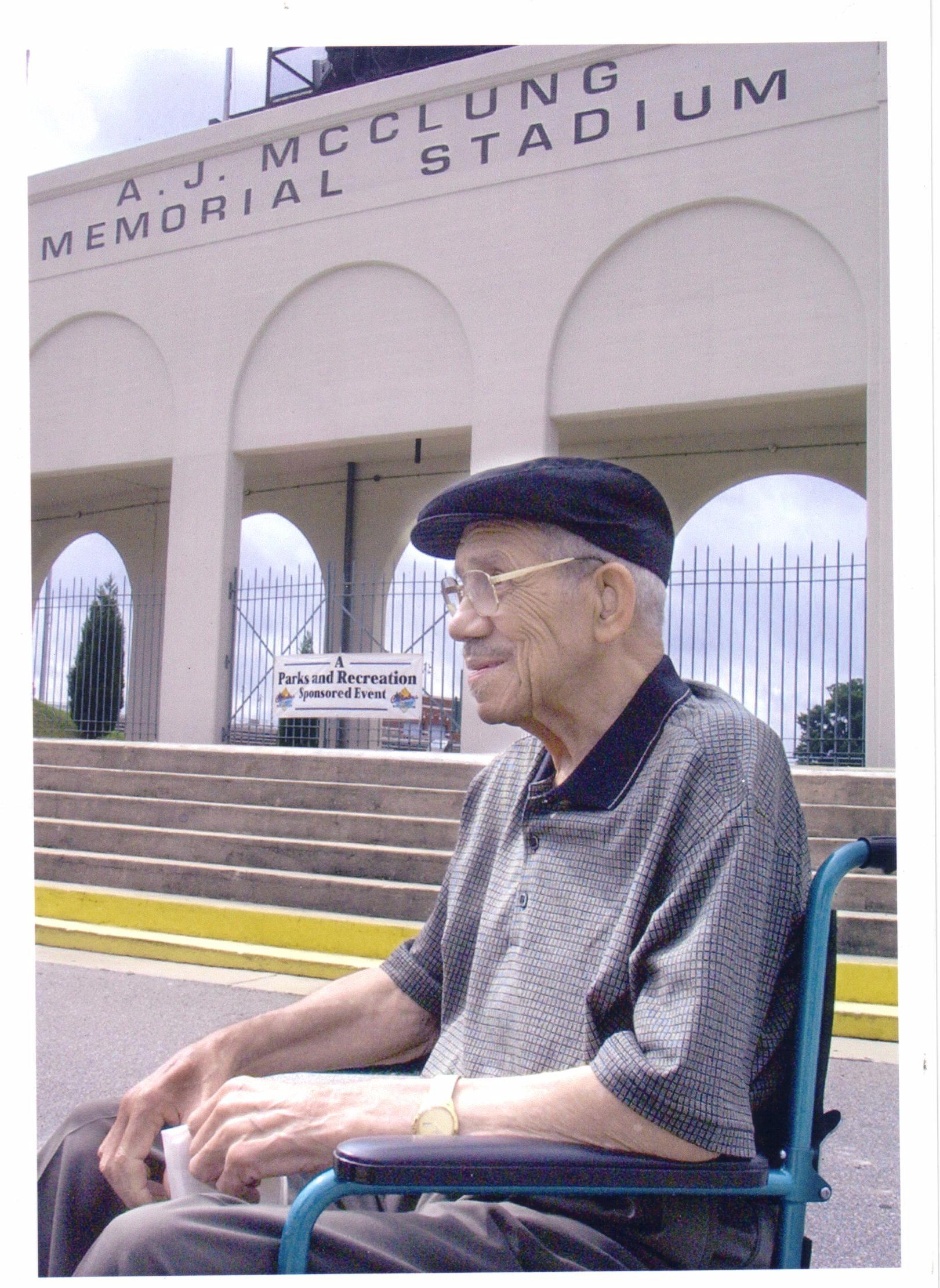
A. J. McClung at the stadium named for him
