= List of black college football classics =

This is a list of recent black college football classics that have taken place between historically black colleges and universities that compete in college football in the United States. Unlike bowl games, classics take place during college football's regular season; they differ from standard regular season games in that they are often accompanied by entertaining battle of the bands, parades, tailgate parties, social events, concerts, job fairs, and are often played at touristic neutral sites. Football classics annually attract large crowds of alumni, fans, and spectators in general, along with high media interest and corporate sponsorships.

== History ==
=== Background ===
Special games pairing HBCUs have existed since at least 1915 when Wiley University played Homer College in a Louisiana State Fair-sponsored game (most recently called the "Red River State Fair Classic") in Shreveport, Louisiana. The earliest known use of the term "classic" to informally describe a black college football game occurred in 1919 on Thanksgiving Day, for a game between Howard and Lincoln (PA). The earliest documented use of "classic" as part of an annual black college football game's formal name dates to the Thanksgiving, 1921 "Colored Foot Ball Classic," played in Philadelphia between Howard and Lincoln (PA).

Though Grambling State's Eddie Robinson did not invent classic games, he is widely regarded as having perfected them as revenue-generating social events, and a chapter of his autobiography details his efforts at doing so. He was particularly proud of the success of the Bayou Classic, starting from its very first game with 76,000 patrons in attendance. It also developed a national television audience on NBC. As a result of Robinson's efforts, and its proximity to Grambling, Shreveport had established itself as the epicenter of black football classics, hosting at least five in the past (Red River State Fair Classic, Sugar Cup Classic, Red River Classic, Shreveport Football Classic, and Port City Classic). At present, however, Durham, North Carolina is a host to three annual classics and a fourth informal classic that is held there during even-numbered years; it also formerly used to host one called the Midway Classic and another called the Labor Day Classic (not to be confused with the existing classic of the same name based in Houston).

=== Game formats ===
Football classics come in three different kinds of formats. They can pair the same two rivals year after year, or they can feature a single host school with rotating opponents—most famously done during Florida A&M's association with the Orange Blossom Classic. Other classics, particularly those based in the northern and western U.S. where there are fewer HBCUs, simply invite two different schools every season.

Classics that do double as annual rivalry games sometimes consider the first game played under a classic-format as separate from the actual first game of the series, due to the pronounced differences in ambience surrounding the games. For example, Grambling and Southern first clashed in 1932 but today rarely acknowledge their games played prior to the formal creation of the Bayou Classic of New Orleans in 1974; indeed, the series even seems to have intensified since it has become more of a media spectacle—Southern initially won a solid 60% of the games in the series through 1973, but after it was reconfigured as a classic the following year, the series has been largely locked dead even (currently split at 24–24–0, through the 2021 season). One of the more noteworthy annual games that later converted into a classic was the Southern–Tennessee State series. Known as the Buck–Boar Classic starting with the 1958 contest, the losing school was required to hunt wild game that was to serve as the main course of the winning school's meal at their annual sports banquet—if SU lost, it was to hunt for deer in Louisiana's swamps and deliver the venison to TSU's banquet; if TSU lost, it was to hunt for wild boars in the Tennessee mountains and deliver the ham to SU's banquet. A Louisiana-based Turkey Day Classic between Dillard and Xavier played for "the 'Bone of Contention'—literally, the hind-femur of a bull, mounted on a plaque" during the 1940s and 1950s.

Among games that feature a permanent host with a rotating opponent, the Prairie View Bowl (first held in 1928) normally pitted Prairie View A&M against a school deemed to have had a worthy enough year to play in the season-ending game. Florida A&M's similar Orange Blossom Classic began in 1933 as a black equivalent to the segregated Orange Bowl (which was founded the year before as the Festival of Palms Bowl and was originally automatically hosted each season by the University of Miami). By the same token the Sugar Cup Classic—which was hosted yearly by Grambling, initially in New Orleans—offered an alternative to the segregated Sugar Bowl.

The third kind of classic—those featuring two different opponents each season—often occur outside of the southern U.S., where there are fewer HBCUs. These games have long appealed to those who were part of the Great Migration and were nostalgic to see teams from their home states.

=== The future of classic-style football games ===
As participants of the Great Migration have begun to age, it remains to be seen if their descendants (and others from completely different demographic groups) can sustain games that focus on teams from regions of the country that they are less familiar with. Indeed, several classics that were held in the North and West have ceased since 2000.

In addition, the schools themselves have also been forced to weigh the benefits of maintaining their historical ties with classics or to accept the changes of modern game scheduling. Improvements to all modes of transportation and the end of segregation have greatly increased the scheduling options of HBCUs. Also, HBCUs are increasingly scheduling "guarantee games"—roadtrips against National Collegiate Athletic Association Division I Football Bowl Subdivision schools that can guarantee high payouts but are also very difficult to win (all HBCUs compete in the NCAA's Football Championship Subdivision level or below in football). Because of the commitments of some universities—especially Southwestern Athletic Conference (SWAC) schools—to season-finale classic games, they may forgo the opportunity to participate in the FCS playoffs. The Bayou Classic and Alabama-based Turkey Day Classic, for example, are closely associated with Thanksgiving weekend—which directly conflicts with the playoffs' opening round. Labor Day weekend, with its season-opening games, is now the biggest weekend for classics—including the John A. Merritt Classic, the Texas-based Labor Day Classic, the MEAC/SWAC Challenge, and the Palmetto Capital City Classic.

== Recent black college football classics (those active since 2000) ==
Listed below are black college football classics played since 2000. Classics listed in boldface remained active through the 2017 or 2018 seasons. In the cases where classics have shared the same exact name—there have been multiple "Capital City," "Labor Day," "Port City," "River City," "State Fair," and "Turkey Day" classics completely unrelated to each other, for example—the state of origin is also listed to differentiate between them. In the cases where classics have informal names, only those not outright opposed by both schools—such as the "Murk City Classic"—are listed.

Classic Name	Location	Year Established	Notes	Stadium(s)
A. G. Gaston Labor Day Classic	Birmingham, AL	2001		Legion Field
AME Classic (informal name)	Kingsland, GA	2002	See the Ralph J. Bunche Hornets Classic.	
**Aggie–Eagle Classic** (informal name)	Durham, NC & Greensboro, NC	1994	Annual game between North Carolina A&T and North Carolina Central. The series, which began in 1924, rotated between Durham and Greensboro, North Carolina until 1992, although for part of that time (starting in 1949) the series was played in a classic format and known as the Carolina Classic. It was moved to Carter–Finley Stadium in Raleigh, North Carolina and returned to a classic-style format between 1994 and 2005. After its association with Raleigh was discontinued, the series ceased before later being revived as an on-campus event in 2007. It is still informally called the Aggie–Eagle Classic by fans but not officially by the participating schools. In 2016, the game was televised on ESPN3.	Truist Stadium & O'Kelly Riddick Stadium
Angel City Classic	Los Angeles, CA	2007	Formerly an annual game. The event was canceled after the 2008 season.	
Arkansas Classic	Pine Bluff, AR			
Atlanta Football Classic	Atlanta, GA	1981	Formerly an annual game between two NCAA Division I Football Championship Subdivision teams. The event was canceled after the 2014 season to make way for the Celebration Bowl.	
Atlanta Labor Day Classic	Atlanta, GA			
Augusta City Classic	Augusta, GA	1992	Annual game that, prior to 2010, was known as the CSRA Football Classic (named after the Central Savannah River Area).	
Azalea City Classic	Mobile, AL			
**Battle for Greater Baltimore**	Towson, MD	1979	Annual classic between Morgan State and—unusually—a predominantly white institution, Towson. Because Towson plays in a major FCS conference (CAA Football), and Morgan State plays in the MEAC, a conference that does not participate in the NCAA Tournament, it is typically one sided.	
Battle of I-40 Football Classic	Greensboro, NC			
Battle of the Bay	Hampton, VA & Norfolk, VA	1962	Annual game between two schools in different portions of the Hampton Roads area—Hampton on the "Peninsula" and Norfolk State on the "Southside". The event was canceled after the 2017 season with Hampton joining the Big South Conference, but has since renewed as of the 2021 season.	
Battle of the Firsts—Wade Wilson Classic	Philadelphia, PA	2009	See the Battle of the Firsts.	
Battle of the Firsts	Philadelphia, PA	2009	Formerly an annual game between Cheyney and Lincoln (PA), held the first week of the season. The "first" referred to the schools being among the first HBCUs; Cheyney was the first four-year institution established for African Americans, and Lincoln was the third. It originally featured Cheyney as its only permanent team and was part of the Wade Wilson Classic series until 2008 before spinning off to include Lincoln the following year. The event was canceled after the 2017 season with Cheyney disbanding its football program.	
Battle of the Real HU	Hampton, VA	2017	Game between Hampton and Howard. The series was played in Washington, DC in a classic format until 2016 and known as the Nation's Football Classic (see below). The event was canceled after the 2017 season with Hampton joining the Big South Conference.	
**Bayou Classic**	New Orleans, LA	1974	Annual game between Grambling State and Southern, held on the Saturday after Thanksgiving Day at the Caesars Superdome. The series, which began in 1932, is televised on NBCSN. The Bayou Classic is the largest HBCU football classic.	
Big Easy Classic	New Orleans, LA	2000	Formerly an annual game that, since 2002, had featured Jackson State and Southern. It originally featured Southern and—unusually—an NCAA Division I-A school, Tulane. The event was canceled after the 2004 season. JSU and SU now compete in the BoomBox Classic (see below).	
Biker's Classic	Nashville, TN	2006	Annual game featuring Tennessee State.	
**Black College Football Hall of Fame Classic**	Canton, OH	2019	Began with the relocation of the Black College Football Hall of Fame from Atlanta to Canton.	
**Black Wall Street Classic**	Tulsa, OK			
Blues Classic	Fayetteville, NC	2002		
**BoomBox Classic** (informal name)	Baton Rouge, LA & Jackson, MS	2010	Annual game between Jackson State and Southern. The series, which began in 1929, was played in New Orleans in a classic format in 2002 and 2004 and known as the Big Easy Classic (see above). After its permanent association with New Orleans was discontinued, the series began to rotate between Mississippi Veterans Memorial Stadium in Jackson, Mississippi and Southern's A. W. Mumford Stadium in 2005. It was later informally dubbed a name by fans that was never officially adopted by the participating schools; the fans derived its moniker from a combination of the names of the marching bands of the two schools—JSU's Sonic Boom of the South and SU's Human Jukebox.	
**Bluff City Kickoff Classic**	Memphis, TN	2018		
**Bull City Gridiron Classic**	Durham, NC		Annual game featuring North Carolina Central.	
**CME Classic**	Tyler, TX			
CSRA Football Classic	Augusta, GA	1992	See the Augusta City Classic.	
**Capital City Classic** (South Carolina)	Columbia, SC			
Capital City Classic (Mississippi)	Jackson, MS	1993	Formerly an annual game between Alcorn State and Jackson State. The series, which began in 1927, rotated between Jackson and Lorman, Mississippi until 1992, although for part of that time the series was played in a classic format and known as the Dixie Classic. It was moved to Mississippi Veterans Memorial Stadium in Jackson in a classic-style format between 1993 and 2011. After its permanent association with Jackson was discontinued, the series began to rotate between there and Alcorn's Jack Spinks Stadium in 2012. In a document published on the Alcorn website, President M. Christopher Brown II and interim athletic director Dwayne White informally dubbed the game the Soul Bowl, apparently because the game would no longer be played annually in the capital city as the previously existing name suggested—and, also, because classics held in Columbia, South Carolina and Sacramento, California have been using similar names. However, the classic's new name was never officially adopted by JSU and has already been in use with other football-related events in the Deep South for some time now. Likewise, it could prove difficult to revert to the old Dixie Classic name, since it has also been used by other events more recently.	
Capital City Football Classic	Sacramento, CA	2008	Annual game held in September.	
Capital City Freedom Classic	Topeka, KS			
Carolinas Classic	Charlotte, NC	1995		
**Chicago Football Classic**	Chicago, IL	1997	Annual game held in September and played at Soldier Field.	
**Circle City Classic**	Indianapolis, IN	1983	Annual game held on the first weekend in October.	
Cleveland Classic	Cleveland, OH	2011	Annual game held in September and played at FirstEnergy Stadium.	
**Commemorative Classic**	Charlotte, NC	2009	Annual game between Johnson C. Smith and Livingstone College. The series, which began in 1892, featured the first black college football game, and for part of that time (as early as 1927) the series was played in a classic format and known as the Turkey Day Classic (not to be confused with the existing classic of the same name—see below). It returned to a classic-style format in 1976 as the Bicentennial Football Classic and was recognized by President Gerald Ford. It returned to a classic-style format in the 1990s as part of the Statesville Classic.	
Dallas Lone Star Classic	Dallas, TX	2008	Formerly an annual game between Arkansas–Pine Bluff and Texas Southern, held on the Saturday after Thanksgiving Day at the Cotton Bowl stadium in Dallas. The event was canceled after the 2009 season.	
Dayton Classic	Dayton, OH	2005	Annual game featuring Central State.	
Delta Classic 4 Literacy	Little Rock, AR	2006	Formerly an annual game featuring Arkansas–Pine Bluff. The event was canceled after the 2012 season.	
Derby City Classic	Louisville, KY	2009		
Detroit Football Classic	Detroit, MI	2003	Formerly an annual game. The event was canceled after the 2006 season.	
**Down East Viking Football Classic**	Rocky Mount, NC	1998	Annual game featuring Elizabeth City State.	
Druid City Classic	Tuscaloosa, AL	2003	Annual game featuring Stillman College.	
**Eddie McGirt Classic**	Charlotte, NC	2000	Annual game featuring Johnson C. Smith in its home opener that, through 2002, was played in Memorial Stadium before being discontinued for nine years.	
FAMU/FIU Orange Blossom Classic	Miami, FL	1933	See the Orange Blossom Classic.	
**F. E. Whitney Classic**	Hopkinsville, KY	2018		
**5th Quarter Classic**	Mobile, AL	2016	Annual game.	
Fish Bowl Classic	Norfolk, VA	1948	Annual game featuring Norfolk State.	
**Florida Classic**	Orlando, FL	1979	Annual game between Bethune–Cookman and Florida A&M. Televised on ESPNU.	
**Fountain City Classic**	Columbus, GA	1990	Annual game between Albany State and Fort Valley State.	
Gateway Classic	Jacksonville, FL	1953	Annual game featuring Bethune–Cookman. The 2004 game was canceled due to Hurricane Frances.	
Gateway Football Classic	St. Louis, MO	1993	Annual game.	
Gold Bowl Classic	Richmond, VA	1981	Annual game inspired by the Gold Bowl postseason game, which featured schools from the Central Intercollegiate Athletic Association and Mid-Eastern Athletic Conference from 1977–80. It has featured Virginia Union and Bowie State or Virginia State.	
Gold Coast Classic	San Diego, CA	1997		
Greater LaGrange Classic	LaGrange, GA			
Greenville HBCU Classic	Greenville, SC	2005	Annual game.	
**Gulf Coast Challenge**	Mobile, AL	2018		
Gulf Coast Classic	Mobile, AL	1974	Formerly an annual game featuring Alabama State. The event was canceled after the 2009 season.	
Hall of Fame Game Classic	Houston, TX			
Harvey Moore Azalea City Classic	Valdosta, GA	2006		
Heart of Texas Football Classic	Waco, TX			
Inaugural Classic	Montgomery, AL	2014	Game between Alabama State and Tennessee State.	
Iris Classic	Griffin, GA	2013	Game between Clark Atlanta and Fort Valley State. The series was formerly played in a classic format starting in 1961 and known as the Textile Football Classic.	
**Jake Gaither Classic**	Tallahassee, FL			
Joe Turner Classic	Savannah, GA	1994	Annual game featuring Savannah State.	
**John A. Merritt Classic**	Nashville, TN	1999	Annual game featuring Tennessee State, held in early September, and played at Nissan Stadium.	
Kickoff Classic	Jefferson City, MO	2009		
**LU Classic**	Jefferson City, MO & Langston, OK	2015	Annual game between Langston and Lincoln (MO).	
Labor Day Classic (Florida)	Orlando, FL			
Labor Day Classic (Georgia)	Albany, GA			
Labor Day Classic (North Carolina)	Durham, NC			
**Labor Day Classic** (Texas)	Houston, TX & Prairie View, TX	1985	Annual game between Prairie View A&M and Texas Southern. The series, which began in 1946, is played on Labor Day weekend and was played in a classic format in 1947 and between 1952–54 and 1956-57 as part of the Prairie View Bowl.	
**Labor Day Classic** (Virginia)	Norfolk, VA	1991	Annual game featuring Norfolk State.	
**Labor Day Classic: A Marion Nine Invitational**	Montgomery, AL	2017		
Labor Day Golden Classic	Birmingham, AL	2007		
Las Vegas Classic	Las Vegas, NV	2003	Game between North Carolina A&T and Southern. The game replaced the Silver Dollar Classic (see below).	
Lexington Heritage Classic	Lexington, KY	2002		
**Louis Crews Classic**	Huntsville, AL	2010	Annual game featuring Alabama A&M.	
Low Country Classic	Charleston, SC			
**Lucille M. Brown Community Youth Bowl**	Richmond, VA	2002	Annual game featuring Virginia Union.	
**MEAC/SWAC Challenge**	Atlanta, GA	2005	Annual game between a MEAC team and a Southwestern Athletic Conference (SWAC) team, formerly the defending conference champions, held on Labor Day weekend. The event was formerly played in Birmingham, Alabama, Orlando, Florida, and Daytona Beach, Florida. Televised on ESPN2.	
**Magic City Classic**	Birmingham, AL	1940	Annual game between Alabama State and Alabama A&M. The series began in 1924.	
Masonic Bowl	Fayetteville, NC			
Masonic Bowl Classic	Richmond, VA			
McGee Classic	Tulsa, OK			
Memphis Blues City Classic	Memphis, TN			
Miami Dade Football Classic	Miami, FL	2008	Annual game featuring Howard.	
Midway Classic	Durham, NC	1998		
Midwest Classic	Columbus, OH	2003		
Music City Classic	Macon, GA	1998		
Nation's Football Classic	Washington, DC	2011	Formerly an annual game that most recently had featured Hampton and Howard. The event was canceled after the 2016 season. Hampton and Howard now compete in the Battle of the Real HU (see above).	
New York Urban League Football Classic	East Rutherford, NJ	1971	Formerly an annual game, formerly known as the Whitney M. Young Jr. Memorial Football Classic, and held at MetLife Stadium. The event was canceled after the 2015 season.	
**OKC Classic**	Oklahoma City, OK			
Ohio Classic	Cleveland, OH			
**Okeefenokee Classic**	Waycross, GA	2016	The event was suspended after the 2016 season due to Hurricane Irma.	
**Orange Blossom Classic**	Miami Gardens, FL	1933	Formerly an annual game between Florida A&M and Florida International. The game was formerly known as the FAMU/FIU Orange Blossom Classic and was canceled after the 1978 season but was revived in the 1990s. It originally featured Florida A&M against another HBCU school, but the recently revived version included—unusually—a predominantly white institution, FIU. The event was again canceled after the 2005 season but revived again in 2021.	
Orange Blossom–Palmetto Classic	Jacksonville, FL			
Palmetto Capital City Classic	Columbia, SC	2001	Annual game featuring Benedict College.	
Peach State Classic	Atlanta, GA	2002		
Peach State Kick-off Classic	Macon, GA			
**Pete Richardson Classic**	Baton Rouge, LA	2018		
Planters Bank South Classic	Jackson, TN			
Port City Classic (Louisiana)	Shreveport, LA	2002	Formerly an annual game that, since 2010, had featured Grambling State, and was held on Labor Day weekend. It originally featured Southern and was part of the revived Louisiana State Fair Classic series in 2001, before spinning off to become an early September game of its own the following year. The event was canceled after the 2012 season. This game is not to be confused with the old Port City Classic game between Elizabeth City State and Fayetteville State.	
Port City Classic–State Fair Game	Shreveport, LA	2001	See the Port City Classic and the Red River State Fair Classic.	
Pre-Labor Day Classic	Columbia, SC			
Prince George's Classic	Bowie, MD	2004	The first PG Classic was played by Alcorn State and Howard. The second was played by Morgan State and North Carolina A&T. Subsequent games (2006, 2007, and 2008) featured Bowie State as the home team.	
**Prince Hall Americanism Football Classic**	Fairfield, AL			
**Prince Hall Shriners Diabetes Classic**	Durham, NC			
**Raleigh Classic**	Durham, NC			
Ralph J. Bunche Hornets Classic	Kingsland, GA	2002	Annual game between Allen University and Edward Waters College.	
**Red River Classic**	Grambling, LA	1981	Annual game, formerly played in Shreveport, Louisiana, that features Grambling State and a SWAC opponent. The 1999 and 2002 games were part of the revived Louisiana State Fair Classic series. The event was cancelled after the 2003 season, but the revived version began in 2017.	
Red River State Fair Classic	Shreveport, LA	1915	Annual game that, since 2015, has featured Grambling State and a SWAC opponent, and is held during the State Fair of Louisiana. The game was formerly known as the Louisiana State Fair Game, the Louisiana State Fair Classic, the Port City Classic—State Fair Game, and, more recently, the Shreveport Classic and originally featured Southern. The event was canceled after the 2016 season due to Grambling's desire to play an additional game in Eddie Robinson Stadium after the completion of its multi-million dollar renovation.	
Richard Allen Classic	Atlanta, GA		Annual game formerly played in Philadelphia.	
Rivalry Classic	Charlotte, NC	2003	Annual game between North Carolina A&T and South Carolina State.	
River City Classic (Kentucky)	Louisville, KY	1990		
River City Classic (Tennessee)	Chattanooga, TN			
Riverfront Classic	Cincinnati, OH	1999		
Rose City Classic	Tyler, TX			
Shreveport Classic	Shreveport, LA	2010	See the Red River State Fair Classic.	
Silver Dollar Classic	Carson, CA	2002	Annual game, formerly played in Las Vegas. The game was replaced by the Las Vegas Classic in 2003 (see above), so it was suspended and then moved to Carson, California in 2004.	
Skyway College Football Classic	Chicago, IL	2003		
**Soul Bowl** (informal name)	Lorman, MS	2012	Biennial game between Alcorn State and Jackson State. The series, which began in 1927, rotated between Jackson and Lorman, Mississippi until 1992, although for part of that time the series was played in a classic format and known as the Dixie Classic. It was moved to Mississippi Veterans Memorial Stadium in Jackson in a classic-style format between 1993 and 2011. After its permanent association with Jackson was discontinued, the series began to rotate between there and Alcorn's Jack Spinks Stadium in 2012. However, the classic's new name was never officially adopted by JSU and odd-numbered year games in Jackson are not played under any moniker.	
South Florida Classic	Fort Lauderdale, FL			
South Georgia Heritage Classic	Valdosta, GA	2009		
Southern Alabama Heritage Classic	Dothan, AL			
**Southern Heritage Classic**	Memphis, TN	1990	Annual game between Jackson State and Tennessee State, held at the beginning of football season, and played at Liberty Bowl Memorial Stadium.	
Stan Lomax Gold Coast Football Classic	Brunswick, GA	2009		
**State Fair Classic** (Texas)	Dallas, TX	1925	Annual game, formerly known as the Al Lipscomb State Fair Classic, that, since 1993, has been between Grambling State and Prairie View A&M and is held during the State Fair of Texas. The series, which began in 1946, was also played in a classic format between 1959 and 1961 as part of the Louisiana State Fair Classic series.	
**State Fair Football Showdown**	Dallas, TX	2018	Annual game between Southern and Texas Southern during the third weekend of the State Fair of Texas. The series, which began in 1947, was later informally dubbed the Murk City Classic by fans between 2011 and 2017 but was never officially adopted by the participating schools.	
Statesville Classic	Statesville, NC		Annual game featuring Livingstone College.	
Steel City Classic	Birmingham, AL	2001	Annual game between Miles College and Stillman College.	
T. M. "Tim" Crisp Classic	Oklahoma City, OK	1996		
Textile Football Classic	Griffin, GA	1961	Formerly an annual game between Clark Atlanta and Fort Valley State. The series was also played in a classic format in 2013 and known as the Iris Classic (see above).	
The Classic	Charlotte, NC	2006	Game between Bowie State and Livingstone College.	
Tiger Paw Classic	Houston, TX		Annual game, formerly played in San Antonio, between Grambling State and Texas Southern.	
**Turkey Day Classic** (Alabama)	Montgomery, AL	1924	Annual game between Alabama State and Tuskegee and held on Thanksgiving Day. This game is sometimes referred to as the first black college football classic with 1924 considered its inaugural year, but it likely did not adopt the Turkey Day Classic name initially as it was not played on Thanksgiving Day until 1932. This game is not to be confused with the old Turkey Day Classic game between Johnson C. Smith and Livingstone College (see the Commemorative Classic above).	
**Tuskegee–Morehouse Football Classic**	Columbus, GA	1936	Annual game between Morehouse and Tuskegee. The series began in 1902.	
Two Rivers Classic	Fayetteville, NC & Pembroke, NC	2009	Annual classic between Fayetteville State and—unusually—a historically Native American school, UNC–Pembroke.	
VanPort Football Classic	Portland, OR	2002		
**W. C. Gorden Classic**	Jackson, MS	2008	Annual game featuring Jackson State.	
Wade Wilson Classic	Cheyney, PA	1980	Formerly an annual game that was also formerly played in Philadelphia, and featured Cheyney. It returned to a classic-style format in 2009 as part of the Battle of the Firsts—Wade Wilson Classic as an annual game between Cheyney and Lincoln (PA).	
**West End Classic**	Salisbury, NC	2014	Annual game featuring Livingstone College.	
Western Virginia Education Classic	Salem, VA	2000		
**White Water Classic**	Phenix City, AL	2014		
**Willard Bailey Classic**	Richmond, VA	2017	Annual game featuring Virginia Union.	
Willie E. Gary Classic	Jacksonville, FL	2002	Formerly an annual game between Edward Waters College and Shaw.	
**Winston-Salem Classic**	Winston-Salem, NC	2016	Annual game featuring Winston-Salem State.	
Wiregrass Football Classic	Dothan, AL	2009		

== See also ==
- Black college football national championship
- Celebration Bowl
- Pioneer Bowl (HBCU)
- SWAC Championship Game
- Honda Battle of the Bands
- List of NCAA college football rivalry games
