= Labor Day Classic =

American football classic

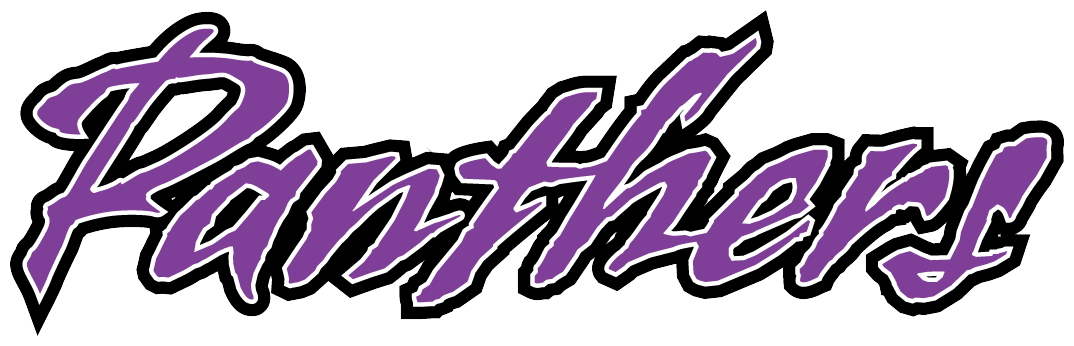
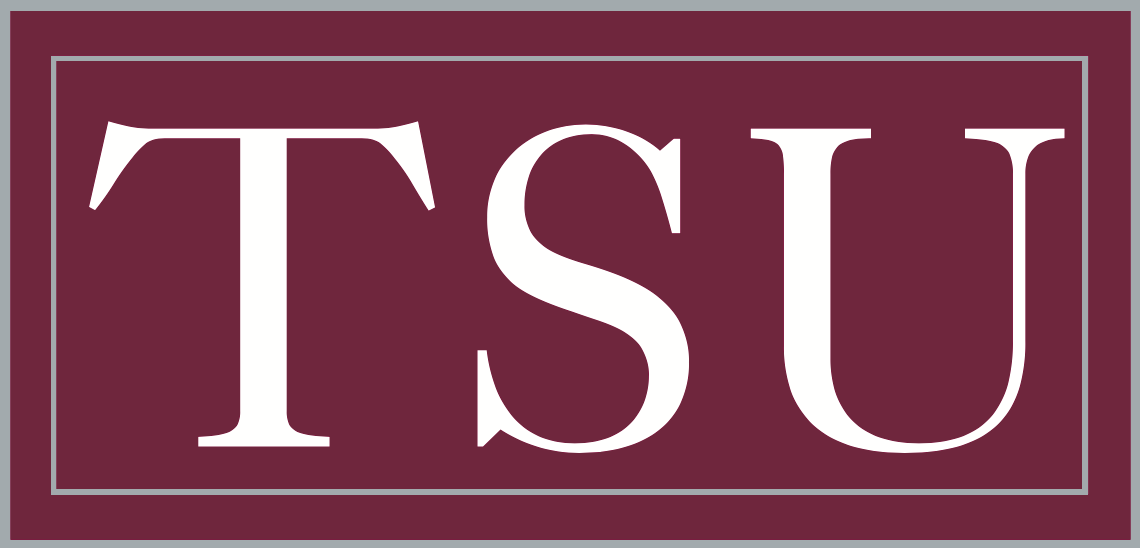
- Prairie View A&M Panthers Texas Southern Tigers
- Sport: Football
- First meeting: October 31, 1947; Texas Southern, 13–7
- Latest meeting: September 6, 2026; Prairie View A&M, 52–14
- Next meeting: 2027
- Trophy: Durley-Nicks Trophy

Statistics
- Total meetings: 82
- All-time series: Texas Southern leads, 45–36–1
- Current win streak: Prairie View A&M, 2 (2025−present)

Locations of Prairie View A&M and Texas Southern

The Labor Day Classic is an annual American football "classic" which features Texas Southern University and Prairie View A&M University, two of Texas' largest historically black universities on Labor Day weekend. It is played at Shell Energy Stadium in Houston or Panther Stadium at Blackshear Field in Prairie View, Texas. The classic is always the first matchup between two Southwestern Athletic Conference (SWAC) teams of the football season.

The first game between the two schools was in 1947. However, the classic began in 1985. In 1990, Texas Southern played and defeated the Hampton University Pirates since Prairie View A&M did not field a football team that year.

The schools compete for the Durley-Nicks Trophy named after the two most legendary coaches from both schools. Alexander Durley is the winningest head football coach in Texas Southern football history. Billy Nicks, Sr. won five mythical black college national championships (last being in 1968) as head coach at Prairie View A&M.

The classic is accompanied by a fellowship luncheon/press conference hosted by The Touchdown Club of Houston, a golf tournament, pep rallies, tailgating, various social mixers, and a highly anticipated battle of the bands on Saturday night between Texas Southern's Ocean of Soul and Prairie View's Marching Storm.

The 2005 Labor Day Classic was postponed to Thanksgiving weekend due to many Hurricane Katrina relief efforts happening in Houston. An estimated 250,000 people from the New Orleans area evacuated to Houston seeking refuge from the major hurricane.

The 2017 Labor Day Classic was postponed because of the effects of Hurricane Harvey. The game was moved to the end of the season, once again joining two other games featuring SWAC teams, the Turkey Day Classic and Bayou Classic, on Thanksgiving weekend.

The 2018 Labor Day Classic was postponed to the final game of the regular season. Prairie View A&M played in the MEAC/SWAC Challenge in Atlanta on Labor Day Weekend.

In 2020, the SWAC postponed all fall play due to the COVID-19 pandemic, which forced the Labor Day Classic to be played in March for the first time in the series.

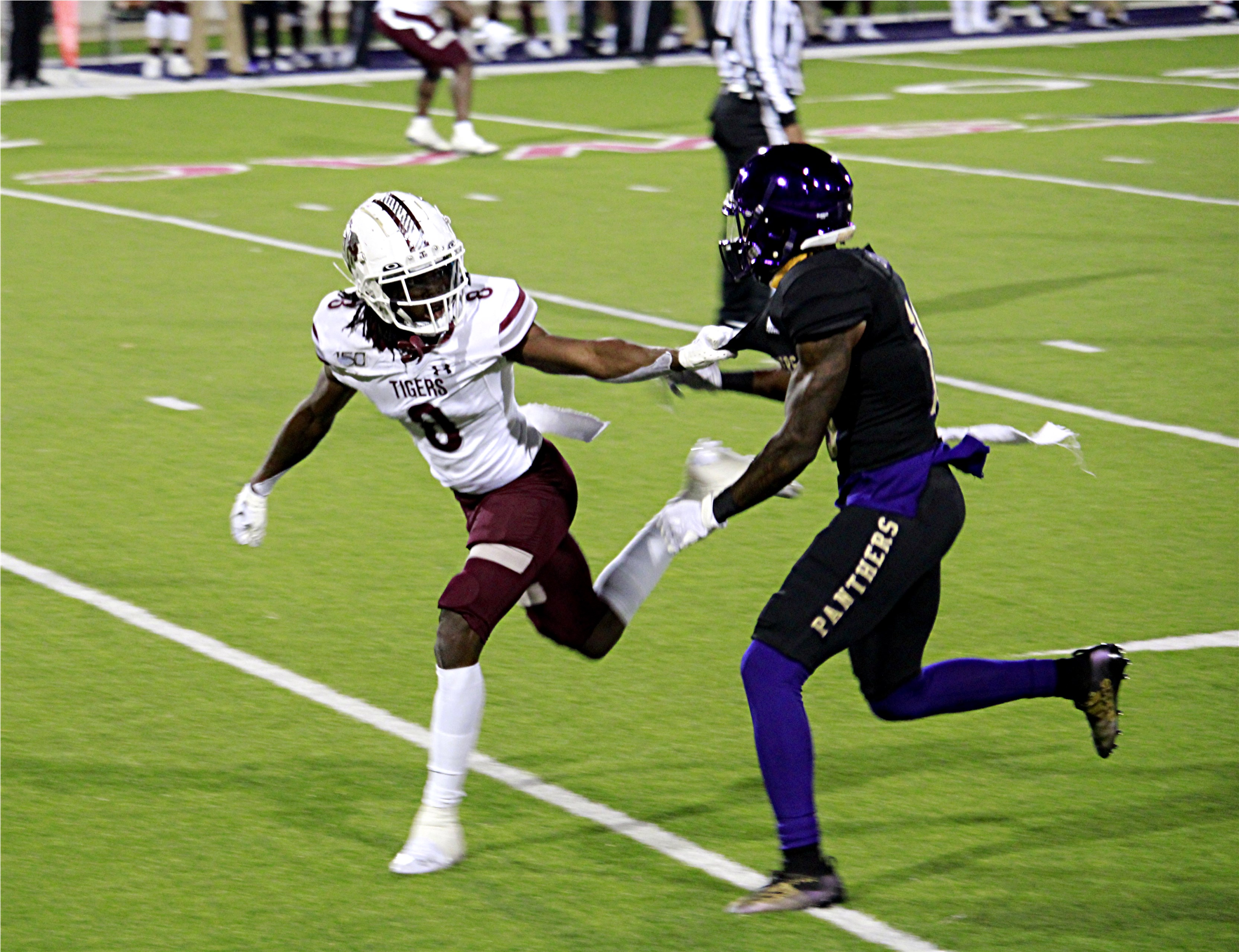
The Labor Day Classic held in March 2021 due to the COVID-19 pandemic

== Game results ==
Prairie View A&M victories	Texas Southern victories	Tie games

No.	Date	Location	Winner	Score
1	1947	Houston, TX	Texas Southern	13–7
2	1948	Houston, TX	Texas Southern	12–0
3	1948	Houston, TX	Prairie View A&M	21–0
4	1949	Houston, TX	Prairie View A&M	13–0
5	1950	Houston, TX	Prairie View A&M	32–6
6	1951	Houston, TX	Prairie View A&M	33–13
7	1953	Houston, TX	Texas Southern	13–12
8	1954	Houston, TX	Prairie View A&M	33–8
9	1955	Houston, TX	Prairie View A&M	14–12
10	1955	Houston, TX	Texas Southern	27–18
11	1956	Houston, TX	Texas Southern	13–7
12	1957	Dallas, TX	Prairie View A&M	27–6
13	1957	Houston, TX	Prairie View A&M	7–6
14	1958	Houston, TX	Tie	6–6
15	1958	Dallas, TX	Prairie View A&M	26–19
16	1959	Dallas, TX	Prairie View A&M	34–15
17	1960	Houston, TX	Prairie View A&M	35–28
18	1961	Houston, TX	Texas Southern	29–14
19	1962	Houston, TX	Texas Southern	21–14
20	1963	Houston, TX	Prairie View A&M	44–6
21	1964	Houston, TX	Prairie View A&M	16–13
22	1965	Houston, TX	Texas Southern	16–0
23	1966	Houston, TX	Prairie View A&M	31–18
24	1967	Houston, TX	Texas Southern	13–3
25	1968	Houston, TX	Texas Southern	22–14
26	1969	Houston, TX	Texas Southern	10–0
27	1970	Prairie View, TX	Texas Southern	17–7
28	1971	Houston, TX	Texas Southern	16–6
29	1972	Prairie View, TX	Texas Southern	13–0
30	1973	Houston, TX	Texas Southern	41–14
31	1974	Houston, TX	Texas Southern	30–20
32	1975	Prairie View, TX	Texas Southern	18–14
33	1976	Houston, TX	Prairie View A&M	22–15
34	1977	Houston, TX	Texas Southern	29–28
35	1978	Houston, TX	Prairie View A&M	20–6
36	1979	Houston, TX	Texas Southern	43–8
37	1980	Houston, TX	Texas Southern	21–6
38	1981	Houston, TX	Texas Southern	19–0
39	1982	Prairie View, TX	Texas Southern	35–0
40	1983	Houston, TX	Texas Southern	28–20
41	1984	Houston, TX	Texas Southern	51–0
42	1985	Houston, TX	Texas Southern	19–7

No.	Date	Location	Winner	Score
43	1986	Houston, TX	Texas Southern	38–35
44	1987	Houston, TX	Texas Southern	30–21
45	1988	Houston, TX	Prairie View A&M	13–10
46	1989	Houston, TX	Texas Southern	45–7
47	1991	Houston, TX	Texas Southern	23–6
48	1992	Houston, TX	Texas Southern	35–0
49	1993	Houston, TX	Texas Southern	38–8
50	1994	Houston, TX	Texas Southern	20–13
51	1995	Houston, TX	Texas Southern	50–8
52	1996	Houston, TX	Texas Southern	42–24
53	1997	Houston, TX	Texas Southern	32–16
54	1998	Houston, TX	Texas Southern	24–13
55	1999	Houston, TX	Texas Southern	34–0
56	2000	Houston, TX	Texas Southern	42–0
57	2001	Houston, TX	Texas Southern	17–0
58	2002	Houston, TX	Texas Southern	44–14
59	2003	Houston, TX	Texas Southern	42–3
60	2004	Houston, TX	Prairie View A&M	25–7
61	2005	Houston, TX	Prairie View A&M	30–27
62	2006	Houston, TX	Texas Southern	17–14
63	2007	Houston, TX	Prairie View A&M	34–14
64	2008	Houston, TX	Prairie View A&M	34–14
65	2009	Houston, TX	Prairie View A&M	17–7
66	2010	Houston, TX	Prairie View A&M	16–14
67	2011	Houston, TX	Prairie View A&M	37–34
68	2012	Houston, TX	Texas Southern	44–41
69	2013	Houston, TX	Prairie View A&M	37–13
70	2014	Houston, TX	Texas Southern	37–35
71	2015	Houston, TX	Prairie View A&M	38–11
72	2016	Prairie View, TX	Prairie View A&M	29–25
73	2017	Houston, TX	Prairie View A&M	30–16
74	2018	Prairie View, TX	Prairie View A&M	60–14
75	2019	Houston, TX	Prairie View A&M	44–23
76	2021	Prairie View, TX	Prairie View A&M	20–19
77	2021	Houston, TX	Prairie View A&M	40–17
78	2022	Prairie View, TX	Prairie View A&M	40–23
79	2023	Houston, TX	Prairie View A&M	37–34^{OT}
80	2024	Prairie View, TX	Texas Southern	27–9
81	2025	Houston, TX	Prairie View A&M	22–21
82	2026	Prairie View, TX	Prairie View A&M	52–14
Series: Texas Southern leads 45–36–1

== See also ==
- History of African Americans in Houston
- List of NCAA college football rivalry games
- List of black college football classics
