= Homer College =

College preparatory school in Homer, Louisiana, U.S. (1880–1918)

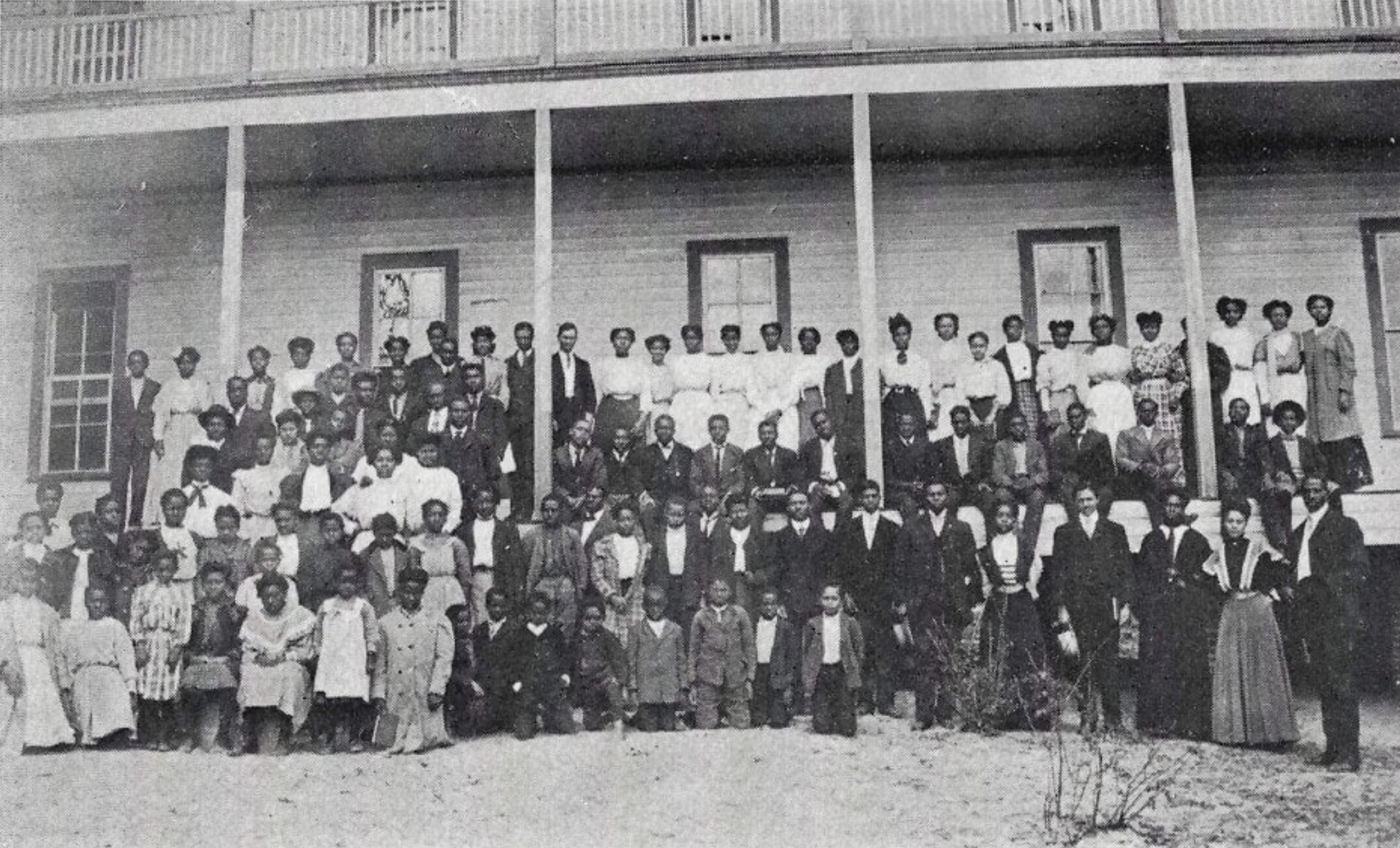
- Homer College students (c. 1908)

Location
- Homer, Claiborne Parish, Louisiana, U.S. 32.772°N 93.060°W

Information
- Other names: Homer Colored College
- Former name: Homer Seminary (1880–1910); Homer College (1910–1918
- Type: Religious elementary school and secondary school
- Religious affiliation: Colored Methodist Episcopal Church (1880–1918)
- Established: 1880
- Closed: 1918

Homer College, formerly Homer Seminary (active from 1880 to 1918), was a private Methodist school in Homer, Louisiana. In 1880 a school was opened under the name "Homer Seminary" as an African American elementary and high school founded by members of the Colored Methodist Episcopal Church or CME (Christian Methodist Episcopal Church since 1954); by 1910 the school was renamed Homer College and became part of the CME, it served as an African American college-preparatory school for Texas College in Tyler, Texas. The school closed in 1918 after a conflict of leadership.

== History ==
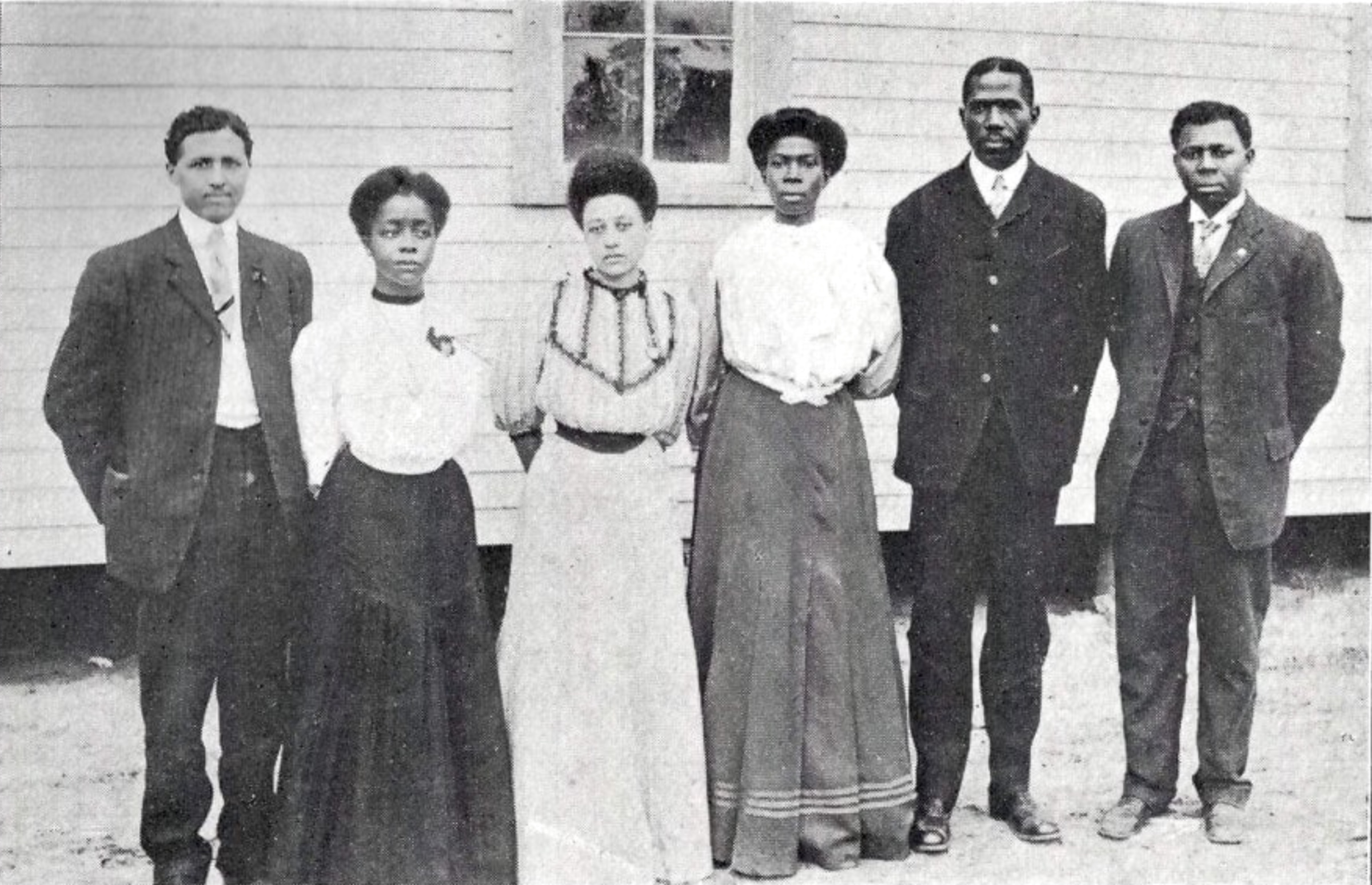
Homer College faculty (c. 1908)

During the annual Colored Methodist Episcopal Church conferences in 1878 and 1879, discussions were held by CME conference members about adding a training school in the state. The town of Homer was chosen by the conference members, and some 80 acres (32 ha) of land was purchased. There were disagreements over the location of the land and the CME church stepped away from the project. The leading CME minister for the conferences, Isaac Bullock, decided to work with local town members in Homer to open the Homer Seminary in 1880 specifically for Black students. Professor M.L. Coleman served as principal in 1880. On average, this school had 200 students annually, with the majority of the students traveling from a radius of a hundred miles.

In 1893, the CME general conference and Louisiana conference took over leadership of the school. In 1910, Monroe F. Jamison was elected to lead the CME conferences. Jamison advocated to transform Homer College into a college-preparatory school for specifically for Texas College. That same year 1910, the school was renamed Homer College in order to change the emphasis of the school (and distance itself from the elementary and secondary school level of education). These changes in Jamison's leadership at Homer College caused conflict and eventually the school closed in 1918.

== Legacy ==
Notable faculty at Homer College included J.R. Ramsey (who later taught math classes at Alcorn College); Thomas W. Sherard; Rev. A.M.D. Langrum, former president of Homer College; and A.L. Vaughn.

Other colleges and schools created by the Colored Methodist Episcopal Church included Texas College in Tyler, Texas; Paine College in Augusta, Georgia; Lane College in Jackson, Tennessee; Haygood Seminary in Washington, Arkansas; Miles Memorial College in Birmingham, Alabama; and the Mississippi Industrial College in Holly Springs, Mississippi.

== See also ==
- Clifton Conference
- List of historically black colleges and universities
- Homer High School (Louisiana)
