= Turkey Day Classic =

- Turkey Day Classic
- Stadium: ASU Stadium
- Location: Montgomery, Alabama
- Operated: 1924–2019, 2021–

2025 matchup
- Alabama State 58, Tuskegee 21

The Turkey Day Classic is a college football game, traditionally held annually on Thanksgiving Day. Originally, it was played between Alabama State University and Tuskegee University, two historically black universities. The game was originally played in Montgomery, Alabama's Cramton Bowl, but relocated to ASU Stadium in 2012. The game is one of two black college football classics to be associated with Thanksgiving weekend; the other is the younger, but more widely known, Bayou Classic, held two days later.

The game fell into a category of classics that feature two rival teams playing each year. The activities surrounding the game take place over several weeks in the downtown of Montgomery, and include parades, parties, and the like. Many classics feature activities and events like golfing, pageants, and tailgating.

== History ==
The 1924 game was the first in the series and it is considered the first black college football classic. Tuskegee refused tournament slots for the NCAA Division II National Football Championship because the Division II playoffs conflict with the Turkey Day Classic; the Golden Tigers program did this even in successful seasons where it has qualified and earned high playoff seeding. From 1998 to 2009, Tuskegee participated in the Pioneer Bowl, representing its conference nine times in the 11 Pioneer Bowls in that span and winning eight. Similarly, Alabama State and other Southwestern Athletic Conference members opt out of contention for the NCAA Division I Football Championship; this accommodates the Turkey Day Classic, the Bayou Classic in New Orleans, any weather-related reschedulings (such as the 2017 Labor Day Classic) and, during the game's existence, the SWAC Championship Game. SWAC members instead contend for the Celebration Bowl.

Beginning in 2013, Tuskegee withdrew from the contest due to playoff considerations beginning that year. Tuskegee's opting into the playoffs forced the cancellation of the Pioneer Bowl, but the Turkey Day Classic continued, with Stillman College serving as the opponent.

In 2014, Alabama State announced it was officially discontinuing the Turkey Day Classic in order to give itself the option of participating in the Division I championship, should it qualify. For two years, the college held its homecoming on the penultimate Saturday of November; that is, the Saturday before Thanksgiving. Stillman College remained the Hornets' opponent for 2014.

In August 2015, it was announced that the Alabama State-Tuskegee rivalry was to resume in 2017, with these games being held in early September and nicknamed the Labor Day Classic (ambiguously, since another black college football rivalry and Canadian college and professional football Labour Day games also use the name). For the 2015 season, Miles College participated in the November Hornet Homecoming.

In March 2016, it was announced that the Turkey Day Classic would return to its traditional date of Thanksgiving Day, with Miles College returning as Alabama State's opponent. For the 2017 Turkey Day Classic, Alabama State was originally scheduled to host Cheyney University of Pennsylvania, a team it had never faced before, but Cheyney backed out of the contest two weeks beforehand and suspended its football program indefinitely due to the school's ongoing financial problems. Edward Waters College, an NAIA squad whom Alabama State had played once before in its history, agreed to take Cheyney's place on short notice.

The 2018 Turkey Day Classic was contested by a conference rival, Mississippi Valley State University; that university, which won the 1971 contest, had been the only team other than Tuskegee or Alabama State to win the Turkey Day Classic in its history. The move was made in an effort to boost falling attendance and attention for the event, which had failed to sell out the games against other D-II and NAIA opponents. (The strategy was unsuccessful, as attendance continued to fall, and the game went untelevised, as ESPN, the game's previous telecaster, declined to carry the game on any of its outlets.)

The 2019 game featured Prairie View A&M, another division rival, as the Hornets' Thanksgiving Day opponent; the Panthers became the second team other than Tuskegee or Alabama State to win with its 20–17 win over the Hornets.

The 2020 game was effectively canceled due to the COVID-19 pandemic in the United States, as both teams' member conferences cancelled all fall 2020 athletics. For 2021, Tuskegee returned to its traditional spot on the Thanksgiving Day schedule, with the game being carried over the top on ESPN+. University of Arkansas–Pine Bluff served as the Hornets' opponent in 2022, upsetting the home team by staving off a comeback to win, 19–14.

== Game results ==
NOTE: no game in 2020.

Date	Winning team		Losing team		Location
November 15, 1924	Tuskegee	28	Alabama State	7	Montgomery, AL
November 7, 1925	Tuskegee	14	Alabama State	0	Montgomery, AL
November 6, 1926	Tuskegee	14	Alabama State	7	Montgomery, AL
December 10, 1927	Alabama State	0	Tuskegee	0	Montgomery, AL
November 24, 1928	Alabama State	6	Tuskegee	6	Montgomery, AL
November 23, 1929	Tuskegee	20	Alabama State	0	Montgomery, AL
November 22, 1930	Tuskegee	32	Alabama State	0	Montgomery, AL
November 21, 1931	Tuskegee	32	Alabama State	7	Montgomery, AL
November 24, 1932	Tuskegee	7	Alabama State	0	Montgomery, AL
November 30, 1933	Tuskegee	14	Alabama State	7	Montgomery, AL
November 29, 1934	Alabama State	6	Tuskegee	2	Montgomery, AL
November 28, 1935	Alabama State	3	Tuskegee	0	Montgomery, AL
November 26, 1936	Tuskegee	6	Alabama State	0	Montgomery, AL
November 25, 1937	Tuskegee	14	Alabama State	0	Montgomery, AL
November 24, 1938	Alabama State	26	Tuskegee	0	Montgomery, AL
November 30, 1939	Tuskegee	6	Alabama State	0	Montgomery, AL
November 28, 1940	Alabama State	31	Tuskegee	12	Montgomery, AL
November 20, 1941	Tuskegee	33	Alabama State	6	Montgomery, AL
November 23, 1942	Tuskegee	25	Alabama State	0	Montgomery, AL
November 25, 1943	Tuskegee	19	Alabama State	13	Montgomery, AL
1944	Tuskegee	32	Alabama State	12	Montgomery, AL
1945	Tuskegee	26	Alabama State	0	Montgomery, AL
November 28, 1946	Tuskegee	26	Alabama State	14	Montgomery, AL
November 27, 1947	Alabama State	26	Tuskegee	26	Montgomery, AL
November 25, 1948	Tuskegee	15	Alabama State	0	Tuskegee, AL
November 24, 1949	Tuskegee	20	Alabama State	19	Montgomery, AL
November 23, 1950	Tuskegee	15	Alabama State	0	Montgomery, AL
November 22, 1951	Tuskegee	26	Alabama State	13	Montgomery, AL
November 27, 1952	Alabama State	28	Tuskegee	13	Montgomery, AL
November 26, 1953	Alabama State	6	Tuskegee	2	Montgomery, AL
November 25, 1954	Alabama State	23	Tuskegee	2	Montgomery, AL
November 24, 1955	Alabama State	19	Tuskegee	13	Montgomery, AL
November 22, 1956	Tuskegee	19	Alabama State	13	Montgomery, AL
1957	Alabama State	13	Tuskegee	7	Montgomery, AL
November 27, 1958	Tuskegee	24	Alabama State	20	Montgomery, AL
November 26, 1959	Alabama State	22	Tuskegee	20	Montgomery, AL
November 24, 1960	Tuskegee	12	Alabama State	8	Montgomery, AL
November 23, 1961	Tuskegee	19	Alabama State	8	Montgomery, AL
November 22, 1962	Tuskegee	42	Alabama State	0	Montgomery, AL
November 28, 1963	Tuskegee	3	Alabama State	0	Montgomery, AL
November 26, 1964	Alabama State	19	Tuskegee	11	Montgomery, AL
November 25, 1965	Alabama State	20	Tuskegee	12	Montgomery, AL
November 24, 1966	Alabama State	35	Tuskegee	14	Montgomery, AL
November 23, 1967	Tuskegee	21	Alabama State	8	Montgomery, AL
November 28, 1968	Tuskegee	23	Alabama State	21	Montgomery, AL
November 27, 1969	Tuskegee	28	Alabama State	14	Montgomery, AL
November 25, 1970	Tuskegee	34	Alabama State	20	Montgomery, AL
November 28, 1971	Mississippi Valley State	10	Alabama State	7	Montgomery, AL
December 2, 1972	Tuskegee	10	Alabama State	0	Montgomery, AL
December 1, 1973	Tuskegee	22	Alabama State	15	Montgomery, AL
December 7, 1974	Tuskegee	28	Alabama State	7	Montgomery, AL
November 27, 1975	Alabama State	37	Tuskegee	21	Montgomery, AL
November 25, 1976	Alabama State	29	Tuskegee	14	Montgomery, AL
November 22, 1977	Alabama State	13	Tuskegee	7	Montgomery, AL
November 25, 1978	Alabama State	15	Tuskegee	0	Montgomery, AL
November 22, 1979	Alabama State	20	Tuskegee	6	Montgomery, AL
November 27, 1980	Alabama State	14	Tuskegee	7	Montgomery, AL
November 26, 1981	Tuskegee	14	Alabama State	3	Montgomery, AL
November 25, 1982	Tuskegee	14	Alabama State	13	Tuskegee, AL
November 24, 1983	Alabama State	13	Tuskegee	3	Montgomery, AL
November 22, 1984	Alabama State	31	Tuskegee	8	Montgomery, AL
November 28, 1985	Alabama State	21	Tuskegee	0	Montgomery, AL
November 27, 1986	Alabama State	21	Clark Atlanta	6	Montgomery, AL
November 26, 1987	Alabama State	21	Johnson C. Smith	3	Montgomery, AL
November 24, 1988	Alabama State	17	Tuskegee	0	Montgomery, AL
November 23, 1989	Alabama State	26	Tuskegee	20	Montgomery, AL
November 22, 1990	Alabama State	49	Tuskegee	7	Montgomery, AL
November 28, 1991	Alabama State	62	Johnson C. Smith	6	Montgomery, AL
November 26, 1992	Alabama State	17	Fayetteville State	14	Montgomery, AL
November 25, 1993	Alabama State	31	Tuskegee	30	Montgomery, AL
November 24, 1994	Alabama State	37	Tuskegee	35	Montgomery, AL
November 24, 1995	Alabama State	58	Tuskegee	20	Montgomery, AL
November 28, 1996	Tuskegee	21	Alabama State	14	Montgomery, AL
November 27, 1997	Tuskegee	21	Alabama State	16	Montgomery, AL
November 26, 1998	Alabama State	27	Tuskegee	7	Montgomery, AL
November 25, 1999	Tuskegee	37	Alabama State	34	Montgomery, AL
November 23, 2000	Tuskegee	28	Alabama State	27	Montgomery, AL
November 22, 2001	Tuskegee	31	Alabama State	27	Montgomery, AL
November 28, 2002	Tuskegee	25	Alabama State	20	Montgomery, AL
November 27, 2003	Alabama State	48	Tuskegee	28	Montgomery, AL
November 25, 2004	Tuskegee	27	Alabama State	17	Montgomery, AL
November 24, 2005	Tuskegee	28	Alabama State	27	Montgomery, AL
November 23, 2006	Tuskegee	17	Alabama State	10	Montgomery, AL
November 22, 2007	Tuskegee	64	Alabama State	58	Montgomery, AL
November 27, 2008	Alabama State	17	Tuskegee	13	Montgomery, AL
November 26, 2009	Tuskegee	21	Alabama State	0	Montgomery, AL
November 25, 2010	Tuskegee	17	Alabama State	10	Montgomery, AL
November 24, 2011	Alabama State	30	Tuskegee	21	Montgomery, AL
November 22, 2012	Tuskegee	27	Alabama State	25	Montgomery, AL
November 28, 2013	Alabama State	41	Stillman	28	Montgomery, AL
November 22, 2014	Alabama State	30	Stillman	27	Montgomery, AL
November 21, 2015	Alabama State	26	Miles College	7	Montgomery, AL
November 24, 2016	Alabama State	53	Miles College	20	Montgomery, AL
November 23, 2017	Alabama State	37	Edward Waters College	3	Montgomery, AL
November 22, 2018	Alabama State	31*	Mississippi Valley State	24	Montgomery, AL
November 28, 2019	Prairie View A&M	20	Alabama State	17	Montgomery, AL
November 25, 2021	Alabama State	43	Tuskegee	9	Montgomery, AL
November 24, 2022	Arkansas–Pine Bluff	19	Alabama State	14	Montgomery, AL
November 23, 2023	Alabama State	41	Tuskegee	3	Montgomery, AL
November 28, 2024	Alabama State	34	Tuskegee	6	Montgomery, AL
November 27, 2025	Alabama State	58	Tuskegee	21	Montgomery, AL

(*) Game was decided in overtime

== See also ==
- List of black college football classics
- American football on Thanksgiving
