= 2015 Celebration Bowl =

2015 Air Force Reserve Celebration Bowl
- Inaugural Celebration Bowl
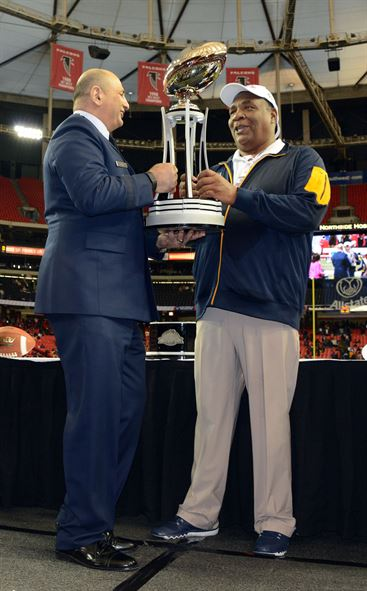
- Head coach Rod Broadway (right) accepting the championship trophy
Alcorn State Braves	North Carolina A&T Aggies
(9–3)	(9–2)
SWAC	MEAC
34	41
Head coach: Jay Hopson	Head coach: Rod Broadway
STATS NR	STATS 22
	1	2	3	4	Total
Alcorn State	6	7	7	14	34
North Carolina A&T	21	3	3	14	41
- Date: December 19, 2015
- Season: 2015
- Stadium: Georgia Dome
- Location: Atlanta, Georgia
- MVP: Offense: #28 RB Tarik Cohen, North Carolina A&T; Defense: #56 LB Denzel Jones, North Carolina A&T
- Referee: Marvel July (Mtn. West)
- Halftime show: Blue & Gold Marching Machine; Sounds of Dyn-O-Mite Marching Band
- Attendance: 35,528
- Payout: US$1,000,000 (Per Conference)

United States TV coverage
- Network: ABC; RedVoice, LLC.
- Announcers: Mark Neely, Jay Walker, & Tiffany Greene (ABC); Sam Crenshaw & Hugh Douglas (RedVoice)
- Nielsen ratings: 1.89 ( viewers)

The 2015 Celebration Bowl (officially known as the 2015 Air Force Reserve Celebration Bowl) was a post-season American college football bowl game played on December 19, 2015 at the Georgia Dome in Atlanta, Georgia. The inaugural Celebration Bowl game pitted the North Carolina A&T Aggies, co-champion of the Mid-Eastern Athletic Conference, against the Alcorn State Braves, champion of the Southwestern Athletic Conference. The event was the finale of the 2015 FCS football season for both conferences as their champions abstained from the NCAA Division I FCS football playoffs.

The game kicked off at 12:00 PM (EST) and was televised live on ABC. The game was also carried nationally on the radio by RedVoice, LLC. ESPN Events was the organizer of the game, while the 100 Black Men of Atlanta managed the game's ancillary events. The United States Air Force Reserve were the title sponsors of the game.

22nd ranked North Carolina A&T won the game, beating Alcorn State by the score of 41–34, claiming the 2015 Black college football national championship before an announced crowd of 35,528.

== Teams ==
The participants for the Celebration Bowl game are based upon the final regular season standings which determine the MEAC football champion and the SWAC football championship Game determining the SWAC representative. The MEAC representative was announced on November 22, 2015, after the release of the final Sagrin ratings. As part of the MEAC tiebreaker, the ratings determined which of the 3 co-champions would represent the conference in the bowl game. The SWAC representative was announced at the conclusion of the SWAC Football Championship Game which matched the top teams from the conferences' eastern and western divisions.

=== North Carolina A&T ===
The North Carolina A&T Aggies entered the season ranked 2nd in both the Sheridan & BoxtoRow polls behind defending National champions Alcorn State. Along with the other four teams that earned a share of the previous years' conference title, the Aggies were favored to win the MEAC championship.

NC A&T played its home opener and first game of the season against Division II Shaw Bears. The Aggies Held the Bears to 44 yards on the ground in 30 attempts in their 61–7 victory over Shaw. After defeating Shaw the Aggies traveled to Chapel Hill, NC to play ACC opponent, the North Carolina Tar Heels. This game marked the first meeting between the Tar Heels and the Aggies. After losing to North Carolina 45–31, A&T defeated nearby In-state FCS opponent Elon 41–7. The Aggies would begin their MEAC campaign by defeating the Hampton Pirates; snapping a six-game losing streak to the Pirates inside of Armstrong Stadium. The Aggies followed up their performance with a 27–3 victory over Norfolk State, giving Coach Rod Broadway his 100th career win and making him the 26th active FCS coach to do so. Following their performance against Norfolk State, the Aggies had a crucial match up against Bethune-Cookman, defeating them 24–14 at home. The Aggies followed up with a 65–14 Homecoming win over Howard. The win secured A&T’s fourth straight winning season. Following their homecoming win, the Aggies broke into the national rankings at #20 in both the STATS FCS and NCAA FCS Coaches’ polls and the team would rise as high as #16 before seasons' end. The Aggies continued earning wins on back to back road games against Florida A&M and 9–6 win over rival South Carolina State. The game came down the final play when SC State Kicker Tyler Scandrett missed a 33-yard field goal attempt as time expired, giving A&T their first win since 1969 over SC State inside Dawson Stadium, ending a 14-game losing streak. The Aggies then faced Delaware State, beating them 27–6 and clinching at least a share of the MEAC football title. The victory also marked the Aggies first back-to-back MEAC title since the 1991 and ‘92 seasons. Running back Tarik Cohen's 132 rushing yards broke A&T's all-time rushing record of 3,624 yards previously set by Mike Mayhew in 2012.

The Aggies went into the season finale facing Arch Rival North Carolina Central with Championship and postseason implications. A&T lost to NCCU 16–21 after a failed two-point conversion attempt late in the 4th quarter left the Aggies needing a touchdown to win. On the final play of the game NCCU's Richard Mitchell sack finalized NCCU securing a second straight victory over A&T and preventing the Aggie sole ownership of the MEAC championship. The loss to the Eagles, coupled with Bethune-Cookman's victory over rival Florida A&M at the Florida Classic, created a 3-way tie and put the conference in a tiebreaker scenario for postseason play. By virtue of the MEAC's Tiebreaker system, A&T was awarded the postseason berth over Bethune-Cookman due to the Sagarian ratings for both teams. North Carolina Central was eliminated as their 0 non-conference FCS division wins removed them from consideration.

=== Alcorn State ===
Alcorn State, the 2014 Black College Football National Champions, entered the season ranked #1 in both the Shaeridan and BoxtoRow preseason polls. Alcorn was also selected to win the 2015 SWAC Eastern Division championship.

The Braves played their first game of the season on the road against #16 Georgia Tech of the Atlantic Coast Conference, where they lost 69–6. After the loss to Georgia Tech, the Braves began their SWAC campaign on the road against Alabama State; defeating the Hornets 31–14. The following week, Alcorn held their home opener against Mississippi Valley State who they defeated 55–14. The Braves would continue their winning streak defeating Concordia College and Arkansas-Pine Bluff before losing to Grambling 34–35 in overtime. Alcorn and Grambling would meet again in the SWAC Championship Game where the Braves would prevail 49–21 and become the 2015 SWAC Champions.

== Pregame Buildup ==
Pregame media coverage of the game focused on the creation of the new bowl game, and the opportunity afforded by this game to the Historically Black conferences. Additionally, the media focused upon the road both programs took to rebuild their programs to the top of their respective conferences.

== Game summary ==
=== Scoring summary ===
Scoring summary

Quarter	Time	Drive			Team	Scoring information	Score	
Quarter	Time	Plays	Yards	TOP	Team	Scoring information	ALCN	NCAT
1	13:36				NCAT	Punt returned 74 yards for touchdown by Khris Gardin, Cody Jones kick good	0	7
1	10:01				ALCN	Punt returned 84 yards for touchdown by Anthony Williams Jr., 2-point run no good	6	7
1	7:44	5	88	2:11	NCAT	Tarik Cohen 74-yard touchdown run, Cody Jones kick good	6	14
1	3:15	1	83	0:14	NCAT	Tarik Cohen 83-yard touchdown run, Cody Jones kick good	6	21
2	11:31	11	46	5:35	NCAT	45-yard field goal by Cody Jones	6	24
2	5:16	1	10	0:07	ALCN	Arron Baker 10-yard touchdown reception from Lenorris Footman, Haiden McCraney kick good	13	24
3	10:12	10	57	4:42	NCAT	43-yard field goal by Cody Jones	13	27
3	6:35	8	49	3:24	ALCN	Lenorris Footman 9-yard touchdown reception from Tollette George, Haiden McCraney kick good	20	27
4	12:57	11	69	5:19	ALCN	Tollette George 11-yard touchdown reception from Lenorris Footman, Haiden McCraney kick good	27	27
4	10:17	6	81	2:33	NCAT	Kwashaun Quick 1-yard touchdown run, Cody Jones kick good	27	34
4	5:10	9	52	5:01	ALCN	Brandon Campbell 3-yard touchdown reception from Brandon Vessell, Haiden McCraney kick good	34	34
4	4:17	2	76	0:44	NCAT	Tarik Cohen 73-yard touchdown run, Cody Jones kick good	34	41
"TOP" = time of possession. For other American football terms, see Glossary of American football.							34	41

=== Statistics ===
Statistics	Alcorn	NCAT
First downs	19	18
Total offense, plays – yards	71–260	65–543
Rushes-yards (net)	32–104	42–366
Passing yards (net)	156	177
Passes, Comp-Att-Int	16 – 39 – 1	13 – 23 – 1
Time of Possession	27:27	21:33

A&T's Running Back Tarik Cohen and Defensive Inside Linebacker Denzel Jones were named offensive and defensive most valuable players. Cohen rushed for 295 yards for 3 touchdowns while Jones had 7 tackles and 1 interception.

A&T outgained Alcorn 543–260 in total yards, which was the most the Aggies have compiled in the five-year Broadway era and a season low for the Braves.

Alcorn's leading receiver was Tollette George, who had 6 receptions for 63 yards and a touchdown. Charles Hughes was Alcorn's second leading receiver, catching 4 passes for 51 yards and 0 touchdowns. The Braves's leading rusher was Quarterback Lenorr. Footman, who ran for 62 yards on 12 carries.

North Carolina A&T's leading receiver was Khris Gardin. Gardin who specializes in punt returns, caught 3 passes for 26 yards and 0 touchdowns. Denzel Keyes was the Aggies second leading receiver, catching 3 passes for 18 yards. Tarik Cohen led the team in rushing, rushing for 295 yards on 22 carries and 3 touchdowns.

== Related events ==
Source: ESPN

- Team Introduction Press Conference, December 10, 2015
- Goodie Hack @ Celebration Bowl, December 16, 2015
- Celebration Bowl Champions Dinner, December 17, 2015
- College Fair, Sponsored by the US Army, December 18, 2015
- Robotics Showcase and Invitational Day 1, Presented by Georgia Power & the US Army, December 18–19, 2015
- The 100 Black Men of Atlanta Celebration Bowl Welcome Event, December 18, 2015
- Celebration Bowl Fan Fest, December 19, 2015
- MEAC vs. SWAC Kickoff, December 19, 2015
- 5th Quarter Post-Game Battle of the Bands, December 19, 2015
