= 2015 Mid-Eastern Athletic Conference football season =

2015 MEAC football season
- League: NCAA Division I FCS (Football Championship Subdivision)
- Sport: Football
- Duration: September 3, 2015 – December 19, 2015
- Teams: 12
- Season champions: North Carolina A&T Aggies; Bethune-Cookman Wildcats; North Carolina Central Eagles (Note: North Carolina A&T, Bethune-Cookman & North Carolina Central each finished the season tied for first place. As a result of the MEAC tiebreaker, North Carolina A&T was invited to the 2015 Celebration Bowl)

MEAC football seasons
- ← 2014 2016

2015 Mid-Eastern Athletic Conference football standings
	Conf.			Overall
Team	W		L	W		L
No. 21 North Carolina A&T +	7	–	1	10	–	2
Bethune–Cookman +	7	–	1	9	–	2
North Carolina Central +	7	–	1	8	–	3
South Carolina State	6	–	2	7	–	4
Hampton	5	–	3	6	–	5
Morgan State	4	–	4	4	–	6
Norfolk State	4	–	4	4	–	7
Savannah State *	1	–	7	1	–	9
Delaware State	1	–	7	1	–	10
Florida A&M *	1	–	7	1	–	10
Howard	1	–	7	1	–	10
+ – Conference co-champions; Florida A&M and Savannah State ineligible for postseason due to APR violations; Rankings from STATS Poll

The 2015 Mid-Eastern Athletic Conference football season was the XXth season for MEAC Football, as part of the 2015 NCAA Division I FCS football season.

== Previous season ==
22nd ranked Bethune-Cookman, along with North Carolina A&T, South Carolina State, North Carolina Central & Morgan State finished the season in a five-way tie for the MEAC Championship. Due to the MEAC's tiebreaker system, Morgan State earned the conference's automatic bid to the FCS Playoffs marking the Bears's first time in the FCS playoffs. Morgan State lost to Richmond in the first round of the playoffs, eliminating the MEAC's lone representative in the postseason.

== Head coaches ==
- Terry Sims, Bethune-Cookman – 1st year
- Kenny Carter, Delaware State– 1st year
- Alex Wood, Florida A&M – 1st year
- Connell Maynor, Hampton – 2nd year
- Gary Harrell, Howard – 4th year
- Lee Hull, Morgan State – 2nd year
- Latrell Scott, Norfolk State – 2nd year
- Rod Broadway, North Carolina A&T – 4th year
- Jerry Mack, North Carolina Central – 2nd year
- Earnest Wilson, Savannah State – 3rd year
- Oliver Pough, South Carolina State – 14th year

== Rankings ==
Legend
Increase in ranking
Decrease in ranking
Not ranked previous week

		Pre	Wk 1	Wk 2	Wk 3	Wk 4	Wk 5	Wk 6	Wk 7	Wk 8	Wk 9	Wk 10	Wk 11	Wk 12	Final
Bethune-Cookman	STATS FCS	RV	RV	RV	RV	RV	RV	RV	RV	RV	RV	RV			
Bethune-Cookman	Coaches	RV	NV	NV	NV	NV	RV	RV	RV	RV	25	23			
Bethune-Cookman	Sheridan	5	5	3	4	4	4	4	6						
Bethune-Cookman	BoxtoRow	3	5	4	5	4	3	3 (1)	4	4					
Delaware State	STATS FCS	NV	NV	NV	NV	NV	NV	NV	NV	NV					
Delaware State	Coaches	NV	NV	NV	NV	NV	NV	NV	NV						
Delaware State	Sheridan	NV	NV	NV	NV	NV	NV	NV	NV						
Delaware State	BoxtoRow	NV	RV	NV	NV	NV	NV	NV	NV	NV					
Florida A&M	STATS FCS														
Florida A&M	Coaches														
Florida A&M	Sheridan														
Florida A&M	BoxtoRow														
Hampton	STATS FCS														
Hampton	Coaches														
Hampton	Sheridan	NV	10	10	10	RV	RV	RV	RV						
Hampton	BoxtoRow	RV	10	8	6	9	RV	RV	8	9					
Howard	STATS FCS														
Howard	Coaches														
Howard	Sheridan														
Howard	BoxtoRow														
Morgan State	STATS FCS														
Morgan State	Coaches														
Morgan State	Sheridan	RV	RV	RV	RV	RV	RV	9	RV	RV					
Morgan State	BoxtoRow	9	RV	RV	RV	RV	9	9	RV	RV					
Norfolk State	STATS FCS														
Norfolk State	Coaches														
Norfolk State	Sheridan	NV	NV	RV	RV	10	7	RV	RV						
Norfolk State	BoxtoRow	NV	RV	RV	NV	RV	T-10	RV	RV	RV					
North Carolina A&T	STATS FCS	RV	RV	RV	RV	RV	RV	RV	24	20	19	19	16	22	
North Carolina A&T	Coaches	RV	NV	RV	RV	RV	RV	RV	24	20	19	14			
North Carolina A&T	Sheridan	2 (7)	2 (10)	2 (11)	2 (10)	2 (10)	2 (10)	2 (10)	1 (19)					3	
North Carolina A&T	BoxtoRow	2 (3)	1 (5)	T-2 (3)	2	2 (11)	2 (11)	2 (2)	1 (18)	1 (20)	1	1	1	5	
North Carolina Central	STATS FCS														
North Carolina Central	Coaches														
North Carolina Central	Sheridan	9	7	8	8	8	10	7	8						
North Carolina Central	BoxtoRow	7	4 (1)	7	10	8	T-10	10	9	8					
Savannah State	STATS FCS	NV	NV	NV	NV	NV	NV								
Savannah State	Coaches	NV	NV	NV	NV	NV	NV								
Savannah State	Sheridan	NV	NV	NV	NV	NV	NV	NV	NV						
Savannah State	BoxtoRow	RV	RV	RV	NV	NV	RV	NV	NV	NV					
South Carolina State	STATS FCS														
South Carolina State	Coaches														
South Carolina State	Sheridan	4	3	9	9	9	9	RV	9						
South Carolina State	BoxtoRow	4	2 (5)	5	3	3	5	6	6	6					

== Regular season ==
Index to colors and formatting
MEAC member won
MEAC member lost
MEAC teams in **bold**

All times Eastern time.

Rankings reflect that of the Sports Network poll for that week.

=== Week One ===
Date	Time	Visiting team	Home team	Site	TV	Result	Attendance	Reference
September 5	6:00 pm	**Bethune-Cookman**	Miami (FL)	Sun Life Stadium • Miami Gardens, FL	ESPN3	0-45	43,467	
September 5	7:00 pm	**Delaware State**	Liberty	Williams Stadium • Lynchburg, VA	LFSN	13–32	18,803	
September 5	7:00 pm	**Florida A&M**	South Florida	Raymond James Stadium • Tampa, FL	ESPN3	3–51	30,434	
September 5	6:00 pm	Kentucky State	**Hampton**	Armstrong Stadium • Hampton, VA		20-35	6,354	
September 5	3:30 pm	**Howard**	Appalachian State	Kidd Brewer Stadium • Boone, NC	ESPN3	0-49	24,314	
September 5	3:30 pm	**Morgan State**	Air Force	Falcon Stadium • Colorado Springs, CO	RTRM	7-63	33,734	
September 5	12:00 pm	**Norfolk State**	Rutgers	High Point Solutions Stadium • Piscataway, NJ	ESPNews	13-63	47,453	
September 5	6:00 pm	Shaw	**North Carolina A&T**	Aggie Stadium • Greensboro, NC	LTV	7-61	13,828	
September 5	6:00 pm	Saint Augustine's	**North Carolina Central**	O'Kelly-Riddick Stadium • Durham, NC		0-72	6,111	
September 5	4:00 pm	**Savannah State**	Colorado State	Hughes Stadium • Fort Collins, CO		13-65	24,571	
September 6	12:00pm	**South Carolina State**	UAPB	Orlando Citrus Bowl • Orlando, FL (MEAC/SWAC Challenge)	ESPN	35-7	7,257	

Players of the week:

Offensive		Defensive		Rookie		Special teams	
Twarn Mixson	Hampton	Javon Hargrave	SC State	Nigel Macauley	NCCU	John Fleck Caleb Gabriel	Howard NC A&T

=== Week Two ===
Date	Time	Visiting team	Home team	Site	TV	Result	Attendance	Reference
September 12	1:00pm	**Howard**	Boston College	Alumni Stadium • Chestnut Hill, MA	ESPN3	0-76	26,132	
September 12	2:00pm	**Florida A&M**	Samford	Seibert Stadium • Homewood, AL	ESPN3	21-58	4,714	
September 12	5:00pm	**Bethune-Cookman**	Grambling State	Eddie Robinson Stadium • Grambling, LA		56-53	12,019	
September 12	6:00pm	**Delaware State**	Kent State	Dix Stadium • Kent, OH	ESPN3	13–45	15,091	
September 12	6:00pm	#22 Richmond	**Hampton**	Armstrong Stadium • Hampton, VA		31-28	3,515	
September 12	6:00pm	**North Carolina A&T**	North Carolina	Kenan Memorial Stadium • Chapel Hill, NC	ESPN3	14-53	44,000	
September 12	6:00pm	**North Carolina Central**	Duke	Wallace Wade Stadium • Durham, NC	ESPN3	0-55	33,941	
September 12	6:00pm	#3 Coastal Carolina	**South Carolina State**	Oliver C. Dawson Stadium • Orangeburg, SC		41-14	12,023	
September 12	6:30pm	**Morgan State**	Illinois State	Hancock Stadium • Normal, IL	ESPN2	14-67	13,391	
September 12	7:00pm	**Norfolk State**	Old Dominion	Foreman Field • Norfolk, VA	ASN	10-24	20,118	

Players of the week:

Offensive		Defensive		Rookie		Special teams	
Jawill Davis	Bethune-Cookman	Terrick Colston	Delaware State	Devin Bowers	Florida A&M	Hadji Gaylord	Norfolk State

=== Week Three ===
Date	Time	Visiting team	Home team	Site	TV	Result	Attendance	Reference
September 19	12:00pm	**Savannah State**	Akron	InfoCision Stadium–Summa Field • Akron, OH	ESPN3	9-52	16,763	
September 17	7:30pm	**Florida A&M**	**South Carolina State**	Oliver C. Dawson Stadium • Orangeburg, SC	ESPN3	0-36	14,987	
September 18	7:30pm	**Howard**	**Hampton**	RFK Stadium • Washington, D.C. (Nation's Football Classic/Battle of the "Real" HU)	ESPNU	19-37	16,342	
September 19	2:00pm	Chowan	**Delaware State**	Alumni Stadium • Dover, DE		31-30	1,995	
September 19	6:00pm	**Norfolk State**	Marshall	Joan C. Edwards Stadium • Huntington, WV	ASN	7–45	24,114	
September 19	6:00pm	Lane	**Bethune-Cookamn**	Municipal Stadium • Daytona Beach, FL		3-7	5,026	
September 19	6:00pm	**North Carolina A&T**	Elon	Rhodes Stadium • Elon, NC		14-7	9,729	
September 19	6:00pm	**North Carolina Central**	FIU	FIU Stadium • Miami, FL		14-39	16,567	

Players of the week:

Offensive		Defensive		Rookie		Special teams	
David Watford	Hampton	Darius Leonard	South Carolina State	Caleb York	South Carolina State	Juwuan Tolbert	Savannah State

=== Week Four ===
Date	Time	Visiting team	Home team	Site	TV	Result	Attendance	Reference
September 26	4:00pm	**Howard**	**Morgan State**	MetLife Stadium • East Rutherford, NJ (New York Urban League Classic)	ESPN3	13-21	65,500	
September 26	4:00pm	**Savannah State**	**Bethune-Cookman**	Municipal Stadium • Daytona Beach, FL	ESPNU	12-42	5,975	
September 26	4:00pm	**Hampton**	**Norfolk State**	William "Dick" Price Stadium • Norfolk, VA (Battle of the Bay)		14-24	6,549	
September 26	6:00pm	Tennessee State	**Florida A&M**	Bragg Memorial Stadium • Tallahassee, FL		30-14	18,020	

Players of the week:

Offensive		Defensive		Rookie		Special teams	
Quentin Williams	Bethune-Cookman	Deon King Craig Johnson	Norfolk State Howard	Donnell Pleasant	Howard	Jonathan Cagle	Bethune-Cookman

=== Week Five ===
Date	Time	Visiting team	Home team	Site	TV	Result	Attendance	Reference
October 3	12:00pm	North Carolina A&T	**Hampton**	Armstrong Stadium • Hampton, VA		45-31	2,139	
October 3	1:00pm	Norfolk State	**Howard**	William H. Greene Stadium • Washington, D.C.		15-12	6,088	
October 3	2:00pm	Morgan State	**Delaware State**	Alumni Stadium • Dover, DE		26-6	1,528	
October 3	4:00pm	Bethune-Cookman	**North Carolina Central**	O'Kelly-Riddick Stadium • Durham, NC		28-26	2,024	
October 3	7:00pm	South Carolina State	Furman	Paladin Stadium • Greenville, SC		3-17	1,022	
October 3	7:00pm	Florida A&M	**Savannah State**	Ted Wright Stadium • Savannah, GA		27-37	4,679	

Players of the week:

Offensive		Defensive		Rookie		Special teams	
Tarik Cohen	North Carolina A&T	C.J. Moore	North Carolina Central	Dorrell McClain	North Carolina Central	Khris Gardin	North Carolina A&T

=== Week Six ===
Date	Time	Visiting team	Home team	Site	TV	Result	Attendance	Reference
October 10	2:00pm	**Delaware State**	**Hampton**	Armstrong Stadium • Hampton, VA		7-21	7,010	
October 10	2:00pm	**North Carolina A&T**	**Norfolk State**	Dick Price Stadium • Norfolk, VA		27-3	6,194	
October 10	4:00pm	**Savannah State**	**Morgan State**	Hughes Stadium • Baltimore, MD		3-42	2,479	
October 10	5:00pm	**North Carolina Central**	**Florida A&M**	Bragg Memorial Stadium • Tallahassee, FL		27-24	9,263	

Players of the week:

Offensive		Defensive		Rookie		Special teams	
Tarik Cohen	North Carolina A&T	Robert Way	Bethune-Cookamn	Oral Varcciann Julius Reynolds	Hampton North Carolina A&T	Peterson Janvier	Morgan State

=== Week Seven ===
Date	Time	Visiting team	Home team	Site	TV	Result	Attendance	Reference
October 17	1:00pm	**Hampton**	**Morgan State**	Hughes Stadium • Baltimore, MD		20-10	7,749	
October 17	1:00pm	**Bethune-Cookman**	**North Carolina A&T**	Aggie Stadium Stadium • Greensboro, NC		14-24	12,471	
October 17	2:00pm	**North Carolina Central**	**Savannah State**	Ted Wright Stadium • Savannah, GA		39-22	5,649	
October 17	2:00pm	**Howard**	**South Carolina State**	Oliver C. Dawson Stadium • Orangeburg, SC		10-49	16,033	
October 17	3:00pm	**Delaware State**	**Florida A&M**	Bragg Memorial Stadium • Fallahassee, FL		13-41	22,678	

Players of the week:

Offensive		Defensive		Rookie		Special teams	
Carson Royal	Florida A&M	John Boston Chris Pauling	Florida A&M SC State	Darien Williams	Hampton	Lynard Jamison	SC State

=== Week Eight ===
Date	Time	Visiting team	Home team	Site	TV	Result	Attendance	Reference
October 24	1:00pm	**Howard**	**#24 North Carolina A&T**	Aggie Stadium Stadium • Greensboro, NC	LTV	14-65	21,500	
October 24	2:00pm	**Delaware State**	**South Carolina State**	Oliver C. Dawson Stadium • Orangeburg, SC		7-34	5,388	
October 24	2:00pm	**Morgan State**	**North Carolina Central**	O'Kelly–Riddick Stadium • Durham, NC		17-20	4,336	
October 24	3:30pm	**Hampton**	William & Mary	Zable Stadium • Williamsburg, VA		7-40	11,736	
October 24	4:00pm	**Norfolk State**	**Bethune-Cookman**	Municipal Stadium • Daytona Beach, FL		49-59	9,875	

Players of the week:

Offensive		Defensive		Rookie		Special teams	
Quentin Williams	Bethune-Cookman	Javon Hargrave	South Carolina State	Dorrell McClain	NC Central	Tevin Richard	South Carolina State

=== Week Nine ===
Date	Time	Visiting team	Home team	Site	TV	Result	Attendance	Reference
October 31	1:00pm	**Savannah State**	**Howard**	William H. Greene Stadium • Washington, D.C.		9-55	1,056	
October 31	1:30pm	**Hampton**	**South Carolina State**	Oliver C. Dawson Stadium • Orangeburg, SC		20-34	19,821	
October 31	2:00pm	**Norfolk State**	**North Carolina Central**	O'Kelly–Riddick Stadium • Durham, NC		16-24	11,965	
October 31	2:00pm	**Bethune-Cookman**	**Delaware State**	Alumni Stadium • Dover, DE		49-21	1,283	
October 31	5:00pm	**#20 North Carolina A&T**	**Florida A&M**	Bragg Memorial Stadium • Tallahassee, FL		28-10	10,279	

Players of the week:

Offensive		Defensive		Rookie		Special teams	
Kalen Johnson	Howard	Deon King	Norfolk State	Kalen Johnson	Howard	Antonio Hamilton	SC State

=== Week Ten ===
Date	Time	Visiting team	Home team	Site	TV	Result	Attendance	Reference
November 7	1:00pm	Howard	Stony Brook	Kenneth P. LaValle Stadium • Stony Brook, NY		9-14	5,109	
October 31	1:00pm	Florida A&M	**Hampton**	Armstrong Stadium • Hampton, VA		0-33	2,211	
October 31	1:30pm	#19 North Carolina A&T	**South Carolina State**	Oliver C. Dawson Stadium • Orangeburg, SC (Rivalry Game)		9-6	15,283	
October 31	2:00pm	Delaware State	**North Carolina Central**	O'Kelly–Riddick Stadium • Durham, NC		10-43	3,051	
October 31	2:00pm	Savannah State	**Norfolk State**	Dick Price Stadium • Norfolk, VA		17-20	10,744	
October 31	4:00pm	Morgan State	**Bethune-Cookman**	Municipal Stadium • Daytona Beach		14-38	7,461	

Players of the week:

Offensive		Defensive		Rookie		Special teams	
Quentin Williams	Bethune-Cookman	Darius Spruill	North Carolina Central	Dorrell McClain	North Carolina Central	Cameron Marouf	Norfolk State

=== Week Eleven ===
Date	Time	Visiting team	Home team	Site	TV	Result	Attendance	Reference
November 14	1:00pm	**North Carolina Central**	**Howard**	William H. Greene Stadium • Washington, D.C.		41-6	3,702	
November 14	1:00pm	**Florida A&M**	**Morgan State**	Hughes Stadium • Baltimore, MD		7-21	1,167	
November 14	1:00pm	**South Carolina State**	**Norfolk State**	Oliver C. Dawson Stadium • Orangeburg, SC		17-10	4,959	
November 14	1:00pm	**Delaware State**	**#19 North Carolina A&T**	Aggie Stadium • Greensboro, NC	ESPN3	6-27	8,732	
November 14	5:00pm	**Hampton**	**Savannah State**	Ted Wright Stadium • Savannah, GA		42-3	2,940	

Players of the week:

Offensive		Defensive		Rookie		Special teams	
David Watford	Hampton	Deon King	Norfolk State	Kylil Carter	North Carolina A&T	Nigel Macauley	North Carolina Central

=== Week Twelve ===
Date	Time	Visiting team	Home team	Site	TV	Result	Attendance	Reference
November 21	1:00pm	**Norfolk State**	**Morgan State**	Hughes Stadium • Baltimore, MD		10-17	1,007	
November 21	1:00pm	**North Carolina Central**	**#16 North Carolina A&T**	Aggie Stadium • Greensboro, NC (Rivalry Game)	LTV	21-16	18,409	
November 21	1:00pm	**South Carolina State**	**Savannah State**	Ted Wright Stadium • Savannah, GA		59-29	4,959	
November 21	2:00pm	**Howard**	**Delaware State**	Alumni Stadium • Dover, DE		32-31	1,983	
November 21	2:30pm	**Florida A&M**	**Bethune-Cookman**	Orlando Citrus Bowl • Orlando, FL (Florida Classic)	ESPN Classic; ESPN3	35-14	45,728	

Players of the week:

Offensive		Defensive		Rookie		Special teams	
Dorrell McClain	North Carolina Central	Theo Livingston	North Carolina Central	Kobie Lain	Delaware State	Brycen Alleyne	Delaware State

=== Postseason ===
Since 1996, the MEAC earned an automatic bid into the Football Championship Subdivision playoffs. As of the 2015 season, the conference champion will abstain from participating in the playoffs and compete against the Southwestern Athletic Conference (SWAC) in the newly created Celebration Bowl. Any other team from the MEAC is able to participate in the playoff if they earn an at-large bid.

==== Bowl Games ====
Date	Game	Site	Television	Teams	Affiliations	Results
Dec. 19	Celebration Bowl	Georgia Dome; Atlanta Georgia	ABC	#22 North Carolina A&T; Alcorn State	MEAC; SWAC	41-34

==== Post Season Awards ====
2015 Postseason Honors
- **Offensive Player of the Year**— Tarik Cohen, North Carolina A&T
- **Defensive Player of the Year**— Javon Hargrave, South Carolina State
- **Offensive Lineman of the Year**— Brandon Parker, North Carolina A&T
- **Rookie of the Year**— Dorrel McClain, North Carolina Central
- **Coach of the Year**— Terry Sims, Bethune-Cookman
Source: .

As the MEAC regular season came to an end, the conference post season awards were announced. North Carolina A&T running back Tarik Cohen and South Carolina State's Javon Hargrave were named Conference Offensive and Defensive Players of the year, both of which received the top honors the previous season. Rounding out the postseason player selections were North Carolina Central's Dorrel McClain, who earned Rookie of the Year, and North Carolina A&T's Brandon Parker, was selected as the Offensive Lineman of the Year.

First-year head coach Terry Sims of Bethune-Cookman was selected as the MEAC Coach of the Year. Sims led the Wildcats to a share of the conference title, including a 9–2 overall finish and 7–1 mark in conference play. Highlights of the Wildcat's season include a victory over rival Florida A&M in their final game of the season which secured their stake in the conference title and entering the STATS FCS Top 25 poll in the final ranking of the season (25th) and reaching the FCS Coaches Poll with a 21st spot.

==== All-Conference teams ====
The following players were named to the MEAC All Conference Teams:

**First Team**
Position	Player	Class	Team
First Team Offense
QB	Quentin Williams	Sr (redshirt)	Bethune-Cookman
RB	Tarik Cohen	Jr	North Carolina A&T
RB	Dorrel McClain	Fr (redshirt)	North Carolina Central
WR	Jawill Davis	So (redshirt)	Bethune-Cookman
WR	Twarn Mixon	Jr (redshirt)	Hampton
TE	Tammarrick Hemmingway	Sr (redshirt)	South Carolina State
C	Carl Jones	Fr (redshirt)	North Carolina Central
OL	Dariusz Bladek	Sr	Bethune-Cookman
OL	Brandon Parker	So (redshirt)	North Carolina A&T
OL	Torian White	Sr	Hampton
OL	Javarius Leamon	Jr (redshirt)	South Carolina State
First Team Defense
DL	Javon Hargrave	Sr	South Carolina State
DL	Miles Grooms	Sr	Hampton
DL	Gabriel Shrrod	Jr	Delaware State
DL	Marquis Ragland	Jr (redshirt)	North Carolina A&T
LB	Deon King	Sr	Norfolk State
LB	Darius Leonard	So (redshirt)	South Carolina State
LB	Robert Way	Sr (redshirt)	Bethune-Cookman
DB	Tony McCrae	Sr.	North Carolina A&T
DB	C.J. Moore	Sr	North Carolina Central
DB	Marquis Drayton	Sr (redshirt)	Bethune-Cookman
DB	D'Metrius Williams	Sr.	Norfolk State
P	Christian Kenney	Jr. (redshirt)	Hampton
First Team Special Teams
PK	Nigel Macauley	Fr	North Carolina Central
RS	Khris Gardin	So.	North Carolina A&T

**Second Team**
Position	Player	Class	Team
**Second Team Offense**
**QB**	David Watford	Gr.	Hampton
**RB**	Anthony Jordan	Gr.	Bethune-Cookman
**RB**	Jalen Simmons	Sr	South Carolina State
WR	Taquan West	Sr.	South Carolina State
WR	Denzel Keyes	Jr	North Carolina A&T
TE	Nathan Scruggs^	Sr (redshirt)	North Carolina Central
TE	Myles Williams^	Sr (redshirt)	Howard
TE	Ja-Quan Lumas	So. (redshirt)	Bethune-Cookman
**C**	Michael Young	Jr (redshirt)	Hampton
**OL**	Clevonne Davis	Sr	North Carolina Central
**OL**	Desmond Cooper	Jr (redshirt)	North Carolina Central
**OL**	Mike Phillips	Sr	Norfolk State
**OL**	Toree boyd	Jr	Howard
**Second Team Defense**
DL	Angelo Keyes	Jr (redshirt)	North Carolina A&T
DL	Reggie Owens	Sr	South Carolina State
DL	Richard Mitchell	Sr	South Carolina State
LB	Denzel Jones	Sr (redshirt)	North Carolina A&T
LB	Donald Smith	Sr (redshirt)	Bethune-Cookman
LB	Jordan Miles	Jr (redshirt)	North Carolina Central
DB	Chris Pauling	Sr	South Carolina State
DB	Ryan Smith	Sr (redshirt)	North Carolina Central
DB	Antonio Hamilton	Sr (redshirt)	South Carolina State
DB	Travon Hunt	Jr	Howard
**Second Team Special Teams**
P	Jack Fleek	Sr	Howard
PK	Jack Fleek^	Sr	Howard
PK	Chase Varnadore^	Sr (redshirt)	Florida A&M
RS	Ryan Smith	Jr (redshirt)	North Carolina Central

**Third Team**
Position	Player	Class	Team	
**Third Team Offense**
QB	Malcolm Bell	Jr (redshirt)	North Carolina Central	
RB	Michael Jones	Jr	Bethune-Cookman	
RB	Christopher Dukes	Sr (redshirt)	Hampton	
WR	Isaac White	Sr	Norfolk State	
WR	Montavious Williams	Jr (redshirt)	Florida A&M	
TE	N/A	—	—	
C	Dominique Woods	Jr	Morgan State	
OL	Zachary Giles	Sr (redshirt)	North Carolina Central	
OL	Cooper Clarkin	Fr	Morgan State	
OL	Sean Fogarty	Fr	Savannah State	
OL	Devon Stainrod	Sr	Savannah State	
**Third Team Defense**
DL	Chris Lee	So	Norfolk State	
DL	Michael Neal	Sr	North Carolina A&T	
DL	Charles Owens	Sr (redshirt)	Hampton	
DL	Damon Gresham-Chisolm	Sr	Howard	
LB	Joshua Thorne	Sr	Hampton	
LB	Malik Harris	So	Delaware State	
LB	Akil Blount^	Sr	Florida A&M	
LB	CB	Dayshawn Taylor^	So (redshirt)	South Carolina State
DB	CB	Marquis Boyland	Sr	North Carolina A&T
DB	Derwin James	Fr	Florida State	
DB	**Third Team Special Teams**			
DB	P	Jonathan Cagle	Jr	Bethune-Cookman
PK	Tyler Scandrett	So	South Carolina State	
RS	Darius Banks	So	Hampton	

^ indicates that there was a tie in the voting

== Records against other conferences ==
=== MEAC vs. FCS conferences ===
Conference	Record
Big South	0–2
CAA	1–4
MVC	0–1
OVC	0–1
Patriot	0–0
SoCon	0–2
SWAC	3–0
Total	4–10

=== MEAC vs. FBS conferences ===
Conference	Record
ACC	0–4
American	0–1
Big Ten	0–1
Conference USA	2-4
MAC	0–2
MWC	0–2
Sun Belt	0–1
Total	2–15

== Attendance ==
Team	Stadium	Capacity	Game 1	Game 2	Game 3	Game 4	Game 5	Game 6	Total	Average	% of Capacity
Bethune-Cookman	Municipal Stadium	10,000	5,026	5,975	7,462	9,875	7,461		35,799	7,160	72%
Delaware State	Alumni Stadium	7,000	1,995	1,528	5,388	1,283	1,983		12,177	2,435	35%
Florida A&M	Bragg Memorial Stadium	25,500	18,020	9,263	22,678	10,279			60,240	15,060	59%
Hampton	Armstrong Stadium	17,000	6,354	3,515	2,139	7,010	2,211		21,229	4,246	25%
Howard	William H. Greene Stadium	10,000	6,088	1,056	3,072				10,216	3,405	61%
Morgan State	Hughes Stadium	10,000	3,763	2,479	7,749	1,167	1,007		16,165	3,233	32%
Norfolk State	William "Dick" Price Stadium	30,000	6,549	6,194	10,744	4,959			28,446	7,112	24%
North Carolina A&T	Aggie Stadium	21,500	13,828	12,471	21,500	9,732	18,409		59,380	11,876	55%
North Carolina Central	O'Kelly–Riddick Stadium	10,000	6,111	2,024	4,336	4,965	3,051		20,487	4,097	41%
Savannah State	Ted Wright Stadium	8,000	4,679	5,649	2,940	2,900			16,168	4,042	51%
South Carolina State	Oliver C. Dawson Stadium	22,000	12,023	14,987	16,033	19,821	15,283		78,147	15,629	71%
