= 2015 Bethune–Cookman Wildcats football team =

American college football season

2015 Bethune–Cookman Wildcats football

MEAC co-champion
- Conference: Mid-Eastern Athletic Conference

Ranking
- FCS Coaches: No. 25
- Record: 9–2 (7–1 MEAC)
- Head coach: Terry Sims (1st season)
- Offensive coordinator: Jim Pry
- Defensive coordinator: Charles Jones
- Home stadium: Municipal Stadium

2015 Mid-Eastern Athletic Conference football standings
	Conf.			Overall
Team	W		L	W		L
No. 21 North Carolina A&T +	7	–	1	10	–	2
Bethune–Cookman +	7	–	1	9	–	2
North Carolina Central +	7	–	1	8	–	3
South Carolina State	6	–	2	7	–	4
Hampton	5	–	3	6	–	5
Morgan State	4	–	4	4	–	6
Norfolk State	4	–	4	4	–	7
Savannah State *	1	–	7	1	–	9
Delaware State	1	–	7	1	–	10
Florida A&M *	1	–	7	1	–	10
Howard	1	–	7	1	–	10
+ – Conference co-champions; Florida A&M and Savannah State ineligible for postseason due to APR violations; Rankings from STATS Poll

The 2015 Bethune–Cookman Wildcats football team represented Bethune-Cookman University in the 2015 NCAA Division I FCS football season. They were led by first-year head coach Terry Sims and played their home games at Municipal Stadium. They were a member of the Mid-Eastern Athletic Conference (MEAC). They finished the season 9–2, 7–1 in MEAC play to finish in a three-way tie for the MEAC title with North Carolina A&T and North Carolina Central. 2015 was the first year the MEAC champion abstained from the FCS Playoffs. Due to their head-to-head loss to North Carolina A&T, they were not invited to the newly formed Celebration Bowl and also did not receive an at-large bid to the FCS Playoffs.

== Schedule ==
Date	Time	Opponent	Site	TV	Result	Attendance
September 5	6:00 pm	at Miami (FL)*	Sun Life Stadium; Miami Gardens, FL	ESPN3	L 0–45	43,467
September 12	5:00 pm	at Grambling State*	Eddie Robinson Stadium; Grambling, LA		W 56–53	12,019
September 19	4:00 pm	Lane*	Municipal Stadium; Daytona Beach, FL	CEN	W 7–3	5,026
September 26	4:00 pm	Savannah State	Municipal Stadium; Daytona Beach, FL	CEN	W 42–12	5,975
October 3	4:00 pm	at North Carolina Central	O'Kelly–Riddick Stadium; Durham, NC	ESPN3	W 28–26	2,024
October 8	7:30 pm	South Carolina State	Municipal Stadium; Daytona Beach, FL	ESPNU	W 17–14	7,462
October 17	1:00 pm	at North Carolina A&T	Aggie Stadium; Greensboro, NC		L 14–24	12,471
October 24	4:00 pm	Norfolk State^{†}	Municipal Stadium; Daytona Beach, FL	CEN	W 59–49	9,875
October 31	2:00 pm	at Delaware State	Alumni Stadium; Dover, DE		W 49–21	1,283
November 7	4:00 pm	Morgan State	Municipal Stadium; Daytona Beach, FL	CEN	W 38–14	7,461
November 21	2:30 pm	vs. Florida A&M	Florida Citrus Bowl Stadium; Orlando, FL (Florida Classic)	ESPN Classic	W 35–14	45,728
*Non-conference game; ^{†}Homecoming; All times are in Eastern time

Source: Schedule

== Ranking movements ==
Ranking movements Legend: ██ Increase in ranking ██ Decrease in ranking — = Not ranked RV = Received votes
	Week													
Poll	Pre	1	2	3	4	5	6	7	8	9	10	11	12	Final
STATS FCS	RV	RV	RV	RV	RV	RV	RV	RV	RV	RV	RV	RV	25	RV
Coaches	RV	—	—	—	—	—	RV	RV	RV	25	23	22	21	25
