= 2015 North Carolina Central Eagles football team =

American college football season

2015 North Carolina Central Eagles football

MEAC co-champion
- Conference: Mid-Eastern Athletic Conference
- Record: 8–3 (7–1 MEAC)
- Head coach: Jerry Mack (2nd season)
- Offensive coordinator: T. C. Taylor (1st season)
- Defensive coordinator: Granville Eastman (2nd season)
- Home stadium: O'Kelly–Riddick Stadium

2015 Mid-Eastern Athletic Conference football standings
	Conf.			Overall
Team	W		L	W		L
No. 21 North Carolina A&T +	7	–	1	10	–	2
Bethune–Cookman +	7	–	1	9	–	2
North Carolina Central +	7	–	1	8	–	3
South Carolina State	6	–	2	7	–	4
Hampton	5	–	3	6	–	5
Morgan State	4	–	4	4	–	6
Norfolk State	4	–	4	4	–	7
Savannah State *	1	–	7	1	–	9
Delaware State	1	–	7	1	–	10
Florida A&M *	1	–	7	1	–	10
Howard	1	–	7	1	–	10
+ – Conference co-champions; Florida A&M and Savannah State ineligible for postseason due to APR violations; Rankings from STATS Poll

The 2015 North Carolina Central Eagles football team represented North Carolina Central University as a member of the Mid-Eastern Athletic Conference (MEAC) during the 2015 NCAA Division I FCS football season. Led by second-year head coach Jerry Mack, the Eagles compiled an overall record of 8–3 with a mark of 7–1, placing in a three-way tie for the MEAC title with Bethune–Cookman and North Carolina A&T. 2015 was the first season in which the MEAC abstained from the NCAA Division I Football Championship playoffs. Due to a head-to-head loss to Bethune–Cookman and lack of FCS non-conference victories, the Eagles were not invited to the newly-formed Celebration Bowl. North Carolina Central played home games at O'Kelly–Riddick Stadium in Durham, North Carolina.

== Schedule ==
Date	Time	Opponent	Site	TV	Result	Attendance
September 5	6:00 pm	St. Augustine's*	O'Kelly–Riddick Stadium; Durham, NC	NSN	W 72–0	6,111
September 12	6:00 pm	at Duke*	Wallace Wade Stadium; Durham, NC (Bull City Gridiron Classic)	ESPN3	L 0–55	33,941
September 19	6:00 pm	at FIU*	FIU Stadium; Miami, FL		L 14–39	16,567
October 3	4:00 pm	Bethune–Cookman	O'Kelly–Riddick Stadium; Durham, NC	ESPN3	L 26–28	2,024
October 10	5:00 pm	at Florida A&M	Bragg Memorial Stadium; Tallahassee, FL		W 27–24	9,263
October 17	2:00 pm	at Savannah State	Ted Wright Stadium; Savannah, GA		W 39–22	5,649
October 24	2:00 pm	Morgan State	O'Kelly–Riddick Stadium; Durham, NC	NSN	W 20–17	4,336
October 31	2:00 pm	Norfolk State^{†}	O'Kelly–Riddick Stadium; Durham, NC	NSN	W 24–16	11,965
November 7	2:00 pm	Delaware State	O'Kelly–Riddick Stadium; Durham, NC	NSN	W 43–10	3,051
November 14	1:00 pm	at Howard	William H. Greene Stadium; Washington, DC		W 41–6	3,072
November 21	1:00 pm	at No. 16 North Carolina A&T	Aggie Stadium; Greensboro, NC (rivalry)		W 21–16	18,409
*Non-conference game; ^{†}Homecoming; Rankings from STATS Poll released prior to the game; All times are in Eastern time
