= 2015 North Carolina A&T Aggies football team =

American college football season

2015 North Carolina A&T Aggies football

Black college national champion MEAC co-champion Celebration Bowl champion

Celebration Bowl, W 41–34 vs. Alcorn State
- Conference: Mid-Eastern Athletic Conference

Ranking
- STATS: No. 21
- FCS Coaches: No. 21
- Record: 10–2 (7–1 MEAC)
- Head coach: Rod Broadway (5th season)
- Offensive coordinator: Chip Hester (1st season)
- Defensive coordinator: Sam Washington (5th season)
- Home stadium: Aggie Stadium

2015 Mid-Eastern Athletic Conference football standings
	Conf.			Overall
Team	W		L	W		L
No. 21 North Carolina A&T +	7	–	1	10	–	2
Bethune–Cookman +	7	–	1	9	–	2
North Carolina Central +	7	–	1	8	–	3
South Carolina State	6	–	2	7	–	4
Hampton	5	–	3	6	–	5
Morgan State	4	–	4	4	–	6
Norfolk State	4	–	4	4	–	7
Savannah State *	1	–	7	1	–	9
Delaware State	1	–	7	1	–	10
Florida A&M *	1	–	7	1	–	10
Howard	1	–	7	1	–	10
+ – Conference co-champions; Florida A&M and Savannah State ineligible for postseason due to APR violations; Rankings from STATS Poll

The 2015 North Carolina A&T Aggies football team represented North Carolina A&T State University as a member of Mid-Eastern Athletic Conference (MEAC) during the 2015 NCAA Division I FCS football season. Led by fifth-year head coach Rod Broadway, the Aggies compiled an overall record of 10–2 with a mark of 7–1 in conference play, placing in a three-way tie for the MEAC title with Bethune–Cookman and North Carolina Central. North Carolina A&T was invited to inaugural Celebration Bowl, where the Aggies defeated Southwestern Athletic Conference (SWAC), champion Alcorn State, earning the program's fourth black college football national championship. North Carolina A&T played home games at Aggie Stadium in Greensboro, North Carolina.

== Before the season ==
At the conclusion of the 2014 football season, the Aggies lost key players such as All-American center Ronald Canty, All-American and three-time All-MEAC standout guard/tackle William Ray Robinson III and 2014 starting right guard Olin Leak and defensive back Donald Mattocks. In addition, one of the best tacklers in school history, All-MEAC linebacker D’Vonte Grant, played his final season with the Aggies. NC A&T was picked to win the MEAC championship and junior running back Tarik Cohen was selected as the preseason offensive player of the year.

=== Recruiting ===
College recruiting (2015)
Name	Hometown	School	Height	Weight	Commit date
Shawn Barnes; WR	Fayetteville, NC	E.E. Smith HS	6 ft 4 in (1.93 m)	180 lb (82 kg)	Feb 4, 2015
Shawn Barnes; WR	Recruit ratings: No ratings found				
Jalon Bethea; DB	Durham, NC	Hillside HS	6 ft 0 in (1.83 m)	170 lb (77 kg)	Feb 4, 2015
Jalon Bethea; DB	Recruit ratings: No ratings found				
Landon Brewer; DB	Lumberton, NC	Lumberton HS	6 ft 1 in (1.85 m)	235 lb (107 kg)	Feb 4, 2015
Landon Brewer; DB	Recruit ratings: No ratings found				
Kylil Carter; QB	Austell, GA	South Cobb HS	5 ft 11 in (1.80 m)	213 lb (97 kg)	Feb 4, 2015
Kylil Carter; QB	Recruit ratings: No ratings found				
Korey Curry; DE	Jacksonville, NC	Northside HS	6 ft 2 in (1.88 m)	235 lb (107 kg)	Mar 26, 2015
Korey Curry; DE	Recruit ratings: No ratings found				
Kris Curry; RB	Jacksonville, NC	Northside HS	6 ft 2 in (1.88 m)	245 lb (111 kg)	Mar 26, 2015
Kris Curry; RB	Recruit ratings: No ratings found				
Craig Gailliard Jr. DB	Dearborn, MI	Edsel Ford HS	6 ft 0 in (1.83 m)	185 lb (84 kg)	Feb 4, 2015
Craig Gailliard Jr. DB	Recruit ratings: No ratings found				
William Hollingsworth; RB	Plymouth, NC	Plymouth HS	5 ft 9 in (1.75 m)	240 lb (110 kg)	Feb 4, 2015
William Hollingsworth; RB	Recruit ratings: No ratings found				
Malik Johnson; OL	Arden, NC	Christ School	6 ft 3 in (1.91 m)	340 lb (150 kg)	Feb 4, 2015
Malik Johnson; OL	Recruit ratings: No ratings found				
Donovahn Jones; WR	Stockbridge, GA	University of Minnesota	6 ft 3 in (1.91 m)	190 lb (86 kg)	Feb 4, 2015
Donovahn Jones; WR	Recruit ratings: No ratings found				
Kadarius Kendrick; DL	Forest Park, GA	Forest Park HS	6 ft 5 in (1.96 m)	250 lb (110 kg)	Feb 4, 2015
Kadarius Kendrick; DL	Recruit ratings: No ratings found				
Adrian McPherson; LB	Fayetteville, NC	E.E. Smith HS	6 ft 0 in (1.83 m)	210 lb (95 kg)	Feb 4, 2015
Adrian McPherson; LB	Recruit ratings: No ratings found				
Cameron Moore; WR	Bayboro, NC	Pamlico County HS	6 ft 3 in (1.91 m)	190 lb (86 kg)	Feb 4, 2015
Cameron Moore; WR	Recruit ratings: No ratings found				
Marcus Pettiford; OL	Durham, NC	Hillside HS	6 ft 4 in (1.93 m)	260 lb (120 kg)	Feb 4, 2015
Marcus Pettiford; OL	Recruit ratings: No ratings found				
Julius Reynolds; LB	Wilmington, NC	Hoggard HS	5 ft 11 in (1.80 m)	215 lb (98 kg)	Feb 4, 2015
Julius Reynolds; LB	Recruit ratings: No ratings found				
Steve Sawicki; P	Hope Mills, NC	Grays Creek HS	6 ft 3 in (1.91 m)	340 lb (150 kg)	Feb 4, 2015
Steve Sawicki; P	Recruit ratings: No ratings found				
Micah Shaw; DE	Fayetteville, NC	Seventy-First HS	6 ft 4 in (1.93 m)	250 lb (110 kg)	Feb 4, 2015
Micah Shaw; DE	Recruit ratings: No ratings found				
Keevin Thompson; RB	Wilmington, NC	Hoggard HS	5 ft 9 in (1.75 m)	195 lb (88 kg)	Apr 15, 2015
Keevin Thompson; RB	Recruit ratings: No ratings found				
Calvin Trotty; DL	Spring Lake, NC	Overhills HS	6 ft 3 in (1.91 m)	270 lb (120 kg)	Feb 4, 2015
Calvin Trotty; DL	Recruit ratings: No ratings found				
Jermaine Williams; DL	Lumberton, NC	Lumberton HS	6 ft 3 in (1.91 m)	265 lb (120 kg)	Feb 4, 2015
Jermaine Williams; DL	Recruit ratings: No ratings found				
Overall recruit ranking:
Note: In many cases, Scout, Rivals, 247Sports, On3, and ESPN may conflict in their listings of height and weight.; In these cases, the average was taken. ESPN grades are on a 100-point scale.; Sources: "2014 Team Ranking". Rivals.com.

== Schedule ==
Date	Time	Opponent	Rank	Site	TV	Result	Attendance	Source
September 5	6:00 pm	Shaw*		Aggie Stadium; Greensboro, NC	LTV	W 61–7	13,828	
September 12	6:00 pm	at North Carolina*		Kenan Memorial Stadium; Chapel Hill, NC	ESPN3	L 14–53	44,000	
September 19	6:00 pm	at Elon*		Rhodes Stadium; Elon, NC		W 14–7	9,729	
October 3	12:00 pm	at Hampton		Armstrong Stadium; Hampton, VA		W 45–31	2,139	
October 10	2:00 pm	at Norfolk State		William "Dick" Price Stadium; Norfolk, VA		W 27–3	6,194	
October 17	1:00 pm	Bethune–Cookman		Aggie Stadium; Greensboro, NC	LTV	W 24–14	12,471	
October 24	1:00 pm	Howard^{†}	No. 24	Aggie Stadium; Greensboro, NC	LTV	W 65–14	21,500	
October 31	3:00 pm	at Florida A&M	No. 20	Bragg Memorial Stadium; Tallahassee, FL		W 28–10	10,279	
November 7	1:00 pm	at South Carolina State	No. 19	Oliver C. Dawson Stadium; Orangeburg, SC (rivalry)		W 9–6	15,283	
November 14	1:00 pm	Delaware State	No. 19	Aggie Stadium; Greensboro, NC	ESPN3	W 27–6	8,732	
November 21	1:00 pm	North Carolina Central	No. 16	Aggie Stadium; Greensboro, NC (rivalry)	LTV	L 16–21	18,409	
December 19	12:00 pm	vs. Alcorn State*	No. 22	Georgia Dome; Atlanta, GA (Celebration Bowl)	ABC	W 41–34	35,528	
*Non-conference game; ^{†}Homecoming; Rankings from STATS Poll released prior to the game; All times are in Eastern time

== Roster ==
2015 North Carolina A&T Aggies Roster (Source)
Wide receivers: 1 Denzel Keyes – Junior; 3 Xavier Griffin – Junior; 8 Khris Gardin – Sophomore; 10 Quentin Todd – (redshirt) Senior; 16 Michael Weaver Jr. – Junior; 19 Kevin Francis – (redshirt) Senior; 81 Caleb Gabriel – (redshirt) Freshman; 82 Keenan Medley – (redshirt) Sophomore; 85 Javius Nixon – Freshman; 86 Deshaun McFadden – Freshman; 88 Malik Wilson – (redshirt) Freshman; Offensive line: 61 Josh Mattocks – (redshirt) Spohomore; 62 Malik Johnson – Freshman; 63 Nicholas Dease – Senior; 66 Arlander Cherry – Freshman; 69 Calvin Trotty – Freshman; 70 Brandon Parker – (redshirt) Sophomore; 71 Chris Davis – Freshman; 72 Darriel Mack – (redshirt) Sophomore; 73 Marcus Pettiford – Freshman; 74 Sylvester Smith – Freshman; 75 Charles Jones – Junior; 76 Shawn Best – (redshirt) Freshman; 77 Charles "Wes" Cole – Junior; 78 Micah Shaw – Freshman; Tight ends: 22 Justin Smith – (redshirt) Sophomore; 87 Dequan Swann – (redshirt) Senior; Fullbacks: 36 Anthony McMinn II – (redshirt) Junior; 39 Corbin Martin – Junior; 46 William Hollingsworth – Freshman	Quarterbacks: 2 Kwashaun Quick^{†} – Senior; 7 Lamar Raynard^{†} – (redshirt) Freshman; 17 Isaiah Hicklin – Freshman; 18 Frank Foster – Senior; Running backs: 20 Daniel Robinson – (redshirt) Sophomore; 23 Amos Williams – (redshirt) Freshman; 28 Tarik Cohen^{†} – Junior; 35 Keevin Thompson – Freshman; 38 Cameron Hill – (redshirt) Freshman; Defensive line: 51 D'Anthony Ross – Junior; 55 Michael Neal – Senior; 94 Justin Cates – Freshman; 95 Julian McKnight – (redshirt) Freshman; 97 James Morris – (redshirt) Senior; 99 Marcus Ragland – (redshirt) Junior; Defensive ends: 50 Angelo Keyes – (redshirt) Junior; 79 Darryl Johnson – Freshman; 83 Korey Curry – Freshman; 90 Malik Hampton-Prioleau – Junior; 91 Kenneth Melton – (redshirt) Sophomore; 92 Miles Hillard – (redshirt) Junior; 93 Turner Echols – (redshirt) Freshman; 96 Sam Blue – (redshirt) Sophomore; 98 Kadarius Kendrick – Freshman; Safety: 41 Aaron Leach – (redshirt) Senior; Rovers: 24 Lorenz Suttles – Junior; 37 Landis Shoffner – Senior	Linebackers: 4 Marcus Albert – (redshirt) Sophomore; 26 Vander Purcell – Sophomore; 29 Craig Gailliard Jr. – Freshman; 34 Deion Jones – (redshirt) Freshman; 44 Julius Reynolds – (redshirt) Freshman; 45 Joshua Patrick – Sophomore; 47 Courtney Edmonds – Sophomore; 52 Kiaundric Richardson – Sophomore; 53 Gerald Caskey – (redshirt) Sophomore; 54 Leroy Hill – (redshirt) Freshman; 56 Denzel Jones – (redshirt) Senior; 57 Markeiss Blue – Sophomore; 58 Adrian McPherson – Freshman; 59 Celeb Smith – Freshman; 65 Seth Schoonover – Freshman; 68 Darryl Jackson – (redshirt) Freshman; Defensive backs: 5 Tard McCoy – (redshirt) Sophomore; 9 Zerius Lockhart – (redshirt) Sophomore; 12 Jerome Beatty – (redshirt) Sophomore; 14 Timadre Abram – (redshirt) Freshman; 21 Tony McRae – Senior^{†}; 25 Jamaal Darden – Sophomore; 27 Marquis Boyan – Senior; 32 Marquis Willis – (redshirt) Freshman; 33 Jalen Bethea – Freshman; 40 Jovan Williams – (redshirt) Sophomore; 48 Jeremy Taylor – Sophomore; Punters: 49 Steven Sawicki – Freshman; 60 Isaac Parks – Freshman; Kickers: 13 Cody Jones^{†} – Junior; Long snappers: 67 Ernest (Petie) Bush III – Freshman; 89 Jonathan Hall – (redshirt) Junior
† Starter at position * Injured; did not play in 2015.

== Coaching staff ==
2015 North Carolina A&T Aggies coaching staff
Head coach: Head coach – Rod Broadway; Offensive coaches: Offensive coordinator/wide receivers – Chip Hester; Offensive line/recruiting coordinator – Keith Wagner (Note: Offensive Line coach Keith Wagner was replaced by Graduate Assistant Ronald Canty following the North Carolina Central Game); Quarterbacks – Chris Barnette; Running backs – Shawn Gibbs; Tight end – Colin Williams; Defensive coaches: Defensive coordinator/defensive backs – Sam Washington; Inside linebackers – Thomas Howard; Outside linebackers – Trei Oliver	Administrative staff: Athletic Director (A.D.) – Earl M. Hilton III; Administrative support associate for football – Jeraldine Bailey

== Game summaries ==
=== Shaw ===
Week One: Shaw vs. North Carolina A&T – Game Summary

Quarter	1	2	3	4	Total
Bears	0	7	0	0	7
Aggies	7	23	17	14	61

at Aggie Stadium, Greensboro, North Carolina

- Date: September 5, 2015
- Game time: 6:00 PM EDT
- Game weather: 82 °F (28 °C), Cloudy
- Game attendance: 13,828
- Referee: Rick Warren

Game information

First quarter

- NCAT – Tarik Cohen 5 yard run, 4:22 (NCAT 0—7)

Second quarter

- NCAT – Tarik Cohen 7 yard run, 11:40 (NCAT 0—14)
- NCAT – Denzel Jones Safety, 10:43 (NCAT 0—16)
- NCAT – Caleb Gabriel 16 yard pass from Lamar Raynard, 10:20 (NCAT 0—23)
- SHAW – Dwigh Campbell 85 yard interception return, 2:54 (NCAT 7—23)
- NCAT – Denzel Keyes 15 yard pass from Lamar Raynard, 00:30 (NCAT 7—30)

Third quarter

- NCAT – Caleb Gabriel 92 yard kickoff return, 14:45 (NCAT 7—37)
- NCAT – Denzel Keyes 2 yard pass from Lamar Raynard, 05:08 (NCAT 7—44)
- NCAT – Cody Jones 42 yard field goal, 00:53 (NCAT 7—47)

Fourth quarter

- NCAT – Lamar Raynard 9 yard run, 10:32 (NCAT 7—54)
- NCAT – Marquis Willis 32 yard interception return, 00:21 (NCAT 7—61)

Top Passer

- Lamar Raynard (NCAT) – 14/27, 188 YDS 3 TD

Top Rusher

- Tarik Cohen (NCAT) – 21 CAR, 106 YDS 2 TD

Top Receiver

- Denzel Keyes (NCAT) – 6 REC, 119 YDS 2 TD

This game marked the 21st meeting overall between the Shaw University Bears and the Aggies, and the first between the two in 52 Years. Going into the match up, the Aggies held the all-time series at 3–17–1. The last meeting between the two in 1968, saw The Aggies defeat the Bears 0–69.

The Aggies called upon redshirt freshman quarterback Lamar Raynard to be the starting quarterback. Raynard passed for 188 yards with three touchdowns and 1 interception. Junior Wide Receiver Denzel Keyes went on to make a career-high six catches to finish with 119 yards receiving and two touchdowns. Preseason All-American & MEAC Offensive player of the year, running back Tarik Cohen, ran for 106 yards and two touchdowns on 21 carries. This game marked Cohen's 13th career 100-yard game. Cohen is now 928 rushing yards short of becoming the all-time leading rusher in school history.

The Bears were held to 44 yards on the ground in 30 attempts. Bruce Parker Jr. returned an interception 85 yards for a touchdown for the team's lone score.

=== UNC ===
Week Two: North Carolina A&T vs. UNC – Game Summary

Quarter	1	2	3	4	Total
Aggies	0	0	7	7	14
Tar Heels	22	14	17	0	53

at Kenan Memorial Stadium, Chapel Hill, North Carolina

- Date: September 12, 2015
- Game time: 6:00 PM EDT
- Game weather: 73 °F (23 °C), Scattered Showers
- Game attendance: 44,000
- Referee: Ron Cherry
- TV: ESPN3

Game information

First quarter

- UNC – Elijah Hood 1-yard run (Pass from Joey Mangili to Caleb Samuel for conversion), 9:47 (UNC 0–8)
- UNC – Kendrick Singleton 47-yard pass from Marquise Williams, 4:39 (UNC 0–15)
- UNC – Elijah Hood 1-yard run, 0:34 (UNC 0–22)

Second quarter

- UNC – Brandon Fritz 2-yard pass from Mitch Trubisky, 7:30 (UNC 0–29)
- UNC – Brandon Fritz 1-yard pass from Mitch Trubisky, 1:56 (UNC 0–36)

Third quarter

- UNC – Marquise Williams 18-yard run, 13:07 (UNC 0–43)
- UNC – Nick Weiler 48-yard field goal, 7:58 (UNC 0–46)
- UNC – Mitch Trubisky 35-yard run, 5:32 (UNC 0–53)
- NCAT – Kwashaun Quick 1-yard run, 1:09 (UNC 7–53)

Fourth quarter

- NCAT – Khris Gardin 38-yard pass from Lamar Raynard, 11:20 (UNC 14–53)

Top passer

- Marquise Williams (UNC) – 15/20, 211 YDS 2 TD

Top Rusher

- Elijah Hood (UNC) – 16 CAR, 56 YDS 2 TD

Top Receiver

- Khris Gardin (NCAT) – 3 REC, 49 YDS 1 TD

This game marked the first meeting between the Tar Heels and the Aggies. The Aggies last saw an opponent from the ACC in 2004, with a 42–3 loss to Wake Forest.

=== Elon ===
Week Three: North Carolina A&T vs. Elon – Game Summary

Quarter	1	2	3	4	Total
Aggies	0	7	0	7	14
Phoenix	0	0	0	7	7

at Rhodes Stadium, Elon, North Carolina

- Date: September 19, 2015
- Game time: 6:00pm EDT
- Game weather: 83 °F (28 °C), Sunny
- Game attendance: 9,729
- Referee: Chris Bloh

Game information

First quarter
Second quarter

- NCAT – Denzel Keyes 12 yd pass from Kwashaun Quick, 1:27 (NCAT 7–0)

Third quarter

- ELON – Connor Christiansen 16 yd run, 13:58 (TIE 7–7)

Fourth quarter

- NCAT – Tarik Cohen 13 yd run, 5:22 (NCAT 14–7)

Top Passer

- C. Christiansen (Elon) – 19/23, 143 YDS 0 TD

Top Rusher

- Tarik Cohen (NCAT) – 23 CAR, 96 YDS 1 TD

Top Receiver

- Denzel Keyes (NCAT) – 4 REC, 46 YDS 1 TD

This game marked the 11th meeting between A&T and nearby In-state FCS opponent Elon. Goin into the game, the Aggies held a 7–4 all-time record against the Phoenix, with the Aggies getting a 17–12 victory on the road in 2014.

=== Hampton ===
Week Four: North Carolina A&T vs. Hampton – Game Summary

Quarter	1	2	3	4	Total
Aggies	10	21	0	14	45
Hampton	7	7	10	7	31

at Armstrong Stadium, Hampton, Virginia

- Date: October 3, 2015
- Game time: 12:00pm EDT
- Game weather: 74 °F (23 °C), Cloudy
- Referee: Rick Warne

Game information

First quarter

- NCAT – Kwashaun Quick 6 yard run, 8:27 (NCAT 7–0)
- HIU – Shakim Alonzo 10 yard pass from David Watford, 6:49 (TIE 7–7)
- NCAT – Cody Jones 37 yard field goal, 1:40 (NCAT 10–7)

Second quarter

- NCAT – Tarik Cohen 13 yard run, 14:37 (NCAT 17–7)
- HIU – Twarn Mixson 32 yard pass from David Watford, 10:45 (NCAT 17–14)
- NCAT – Deion Jones 19 yard fumble return, 8:02 (NCAT 24–14)
- NCAT – Tarik Cohen 3 yard run, 3:50 (NCAT 31–14)

Third quarter

- HIU – Rayshad Riddick 13 yard pass from David Watford; Defensive pass interference (NCAT) declined, 10:06 (NCAT 31–21)
- HIU – Adam Brown 35 yard field goal, 6:00 (NCAT 31–24)

Fourth quarter

- HIU – SeQuan Gooding 19 yard pass from Twarn Mixson, 12:08 (TIE 31–31)
- NCAT – Khris Gardin 71 yard punt return, 5:56 (NCAT 38–31)
- NCAT – Tarik Cohen 2 yard run, 3:17 (NCAT 45–31)

Top Passer

- David Watford (HIU) – 18/40, 242 YDS 3 TD, 1 INT

Top Rusher

- Tarik Cohen (NCAT) – 22 CAR, 107 YDS 3 TD

Top Receiver

- Twarn Mixson (HIU) – 5 REC, 136 YDS 1 TD

This game marked the 44th meeting between A&T and Hampton. Going into the game, Hampton held a 26–16–2 all-time record against the A&T, with the Aggies winning the last meeting 31–14 in front of a home crowd.

=== Norfolk State ===
Week Five: North Carolina A&T vs. Norfolk St. – Game Summary

Quarter	1	2	3	4	Total
Aggies	7	3	17	0	27
Hampton	0	0	3	0	3

at William "Dick" Price Stadium, Norfolk, Virginia

- Date: October 10, 2015
- Game time: 2:00pm EDT
- Game weather: 0 °F (−18 °C),
- Game attendance: 6,194

Game information

First quarter

- NCAT – Malik Williams 26 yard pass from Lamar Raynard, 4:49 (NCAT 7–0)

Second quarter

- NCAT – Cody Jones 30 yard field goal, 3:28 (NCAT 10–0)

Third quarter

- NSU – Cameron Marouf 28 yard field goal, 10:44 (NCAT 10–3)
- NCAT – Tarik Cohen 3 yard run, 8:34 (NCAT 17–3)
- NCAT – Tarik Cohen 6 yard pass from Denzel Keyes, 4:56 (NCAT 24–3)
- NCAT – Cody Jones 38 yard field goal, 0:44 (NCAT 27–3)

Fourth quarter

Top Passer

- Lamar Reynard (NCAT) – 10/23, 118 YDS 1 TD

Top Rusher

- Tarik Cohen (NCAT) – 36 CAR, 152 YDS 1 TD

Top Receiver

- DeAndre Sangster (NSU) – 3 REC, 83 YDS 1 TD

This game marked the 39th meeting between the Aggies and Norfolk State and the first game between the two since 2012. Going into the game, A&T held a 28–11 all-time record against the Spartans, with the Aggies winning the last meeting 30–9 in front of a near capacity Homecoming crowd.

=== Bethune-Cookman ===
Week Six: Bethune-Cookman vs. North Carolina A&T. – Game Summary

Quarter	1	2	3	4	Total
Wildcats	7	0	0	7	14
Aggies	0	10	7	7	24

at Aggie Stadium, Greensboro, NC

- Date: October 17, 2015
- Game time: 1:00pm EDT
- Game weather: 0 °F (−18 °C),

Game information

First quarter

- BCU – Jontavious Carter 82 yard pass from Quenten Williams, 6:55 (BCU 7–0)

Second quarter

- NCAT – Cody Jones 29 yard field goal, 12:47 (BCU 7–3)
- NCAT – Denzel Keyes 2 yard pass from Kwashaun Quick, 3:45 (NCAT 7–10)

Third quarter

- HIU – Denzel Keyes 4 yard pass from Lamar Reynard, 5:49 (NCAT 7–17)

Fourth quarter

- BCU – Larry Brihm 7 yard run, 14:55 (NCAT 14–17)

Top Passer

- Quintin Williams (BCU) – 9/13, 191 YDS 1 TD, 1 INT

Top Rusher

- Tarik Cohen (NCAT) – 20 CAR, 116 YDS 1 TD

Top Receiver

- Denzel Keyes (NCAT) – 4 REC, 32 YDS 2 TD

This game marked the 36th meeting between the A&T and Bethune-Cookman and the first game between the two since 2012. Going into the game, Bethune-Cookman held a 22–14 all-time record against the Aggies, with the Wildcats winning the last meeting 28–12 in Daytona Beach, FL.

=== Howard ===
Week Seven: Howard vs. #24 North Carolina A&T – Game Summary

Quarter	1	2	3	4	Total
Bison	7	7	0	0	14
#24 Aggies	7	23	28	7	65

at Aggie Stadium, Greensboro, NC

- Date: October 24, 2015
- Game time: 1:00pm EDT
- Game weather: 61 °F (16 °C), Partially Cloudy
- Game attendance: 21,500
- Referee: Marcus Woods
- http://www.ncataggies.com/pdf9/4006917.pdf

Game information

First quarter

- NCAT – Kwashaun Quick 4 yard run, 2:27 (NCAT 0–7)
- HoU – Guy Lemonier 40 yard pass from Kalen Johnson, 0:01 (TIE 7–7)

Second quarter

- NCAT – Tarik Cohen 2 yard run; Cody Jones – PAT Blocked, 11:50 (NCAT 7–13)
- HoU – Tamlin Antoine 15 yard pass from Kalen Johnson, 10:14 (HoU 14–13)
- NCAT – Tarik Cohen 31 yard, 5:13 (NCAT 14–20)
- NCAT – Denzel Keyes 8 yard pass from Kwashaun Quick, 2:14 (NCAT 14–27)
- NCAT – Cody Jones 31 yard field goal, 0:10 (NCAT 14–30)

Third quarter

- NCAT – Tarik Cohen 1 yard run, 10:03 (NCAT 14–37)
- NCAT – Angelo Keyes 24 yard fumble return, 7:10 (NCAT 14–44)
- NCAT – Khris Gardin 82 yard punt return, 5:40 (NCAT 14–51)
- NCAT – Amos Williams 1 yard run, 0:33 (NCAT 14–58)

Fourth quarter

- NCAT – Keevon Thompson 4 yard run, 5:28 (NCAT 14–65)

Top Passer

- Kalen Johnson (HoU) – 15/24, 163 YDS 2 TD, 1 INT

Top Rusher

- Tarik Cohen (NCAT) – 17 CAR, 137 YDS 3 TD

Top Receiver

- Guy Leomonier (HoU) – 2 REC, 44 YDS 1 TD

This game marked the 38th meeting between the A&T and Howard. Going into the game, A&T held a 26–20–2 all-time record against the Bison, with the Aggies winning the last meeting 38–22 in 2014. For the first time this season, the Aggies are nationally ranked, breaking into the top 25 at #24.

Junior Running Back Tarik Cohen rushed for 137 yards and three touchdowns as North Carolina A&T rolled over 0–7 Howard in the Aggies' Homecoming game. Quarterback Kwashaun Quick threw for 67 yards and one touchdown and rushed for 85 yards and another score, while Amos Williams also rushed for 85 yards and one touchdown. On the Bison's side, Quarterback Kalen Johnson threw for 163 yards and two touchdowns. Howard was able to establish a 14–13 lead until Cohen broke for a 31-yard touchdown run with 5:13 left in the second quarter. The Aggies then quickly added 10 more points to go into halftime with a 30–14 lead. In the second half, the Aggies scored 34 unanswered points. Howard were never able to mount a rushing attack as A&T compiled 311 rushing yards and held the Bison to only 31.

The win secures A&T's fourth straight winning season.

=== Florida A&M ===
Week Eight: #20 North Carolina A&T vs. Florida A&M. – Game Summary

Quarter	1	2	3	4	Total
#20 Aggies	14	7	7	0	28
Rattlers	0	0	7	3	10

at Bragg Memorial Stadium, Tallahassee, FL

- Date: October 31, 2015
- Game time: 3:00pm EDT
- Game weather: 80 °F (27 °C),

Game information

First quarter

- NCAT – Kwashaun Quick 7 yard run, 7:28 (NCAT 7–0)
- NCAT – Tarik Cohen 24 yard run, 1:47 (NCAT 14–0)

Second quarter

- NCAT – Malik Wilson 53 yard pass from Lamar Raynard, 1:47 (NCAT 21–0)

Third quarter

- NCAT – Caleb Gabriel 24 yard pass from Kwashaun Quick, 12:25 (NCAT 28–0)
- FAMU – Desmond Noird 3 yard pass from Carson Royal, 2:56 (NCAT 28–7)

Fourth quarter

- FAMU – Colby Blanton 27 yard field goal, 7:25 (NCAT 28–10)

Top Passer

- Lamar Raynard (NCAT) – 11/20, 115 YDS 1 TD, 1 INT

Top Rusher

- Tarik Cohen (NCAT) – 27 CAR, 179 YDS 1 TD

Top Receiver

- Brandon Norwood (FAMU) – 6 REC, 53 YDS 0 TD

This game will mark the 63rd meeting between the A&T and Florida A&M. Going into the game, Florida A&M holds a 44–16–3 all-time record against the Aggies, with the A&T winning the last meeting 40–21 in 2014.

=== South Carolina State ===
Week Nine: #19 North Carolina A&T vs. South Carolina State. – Game Summary

Quarter	1	2	3	4	Total
#19 Aggies	0	0	2	7	9
Bulldogs	3	0	3	0	6

at Oliver C. Dawson Stadium, Orangeburg, SC

- Date: November 7, 2015
- Game time: 1:00pm EDT
- Game weather: 75 °F (24 °C),
- Referee: Andre Lowe

Game information

First quarter

- SCSU – Tyler Scandrett 30 yard field goal, 10:21 (SCSU 0–3)

Second quarter

No Score

Third quarter

- SCSU – Tyler Scandrett 26 yard field goal, 10:22 (SCSU 0–6)
- NCAT – Team safety, 6:15 (SCSU 2–6)

Fourth quarter

- NCAT – Khris Gardin 17 yard pass from Kylil Carter, 1:39 (NCAT 9–6)

Top Passer

- Caleb York (SCSU) – 19/37, 199 YDS 0 TD, 1 INT

Top Rusher

- Tarik Cohen (NCAT) – 22 CAR, 85 YDS 0 TD

Top Receiver

- Lewis-Freedman (SCSU) – 4 REC, 51 YDS 0 TD

This game will mark the 53rd meeting between the A&T and rival South Carolina State. Going into the game, South Carolina State holds a 32–18–2 all-time record against the Aggies, with the Bulldogs shutting out A&T 13–0 in the 2014 Atlanta Football Classic.

With both North Carolina A&T and South Carolina State being the top two defenses in the MEAC, the contest was low scoring and heavily relied upon the team's defensive lines. In the final play of the game, SC State Kicker Tyler Scandrett missed a 33-yard field goal attempt as time expired. This win was the first time, and the 2nd in 16 attempts, since 1969 that the aggies defeated rival SC State inside Dawson Stadium, ending a 14-game losing streak.

=== Delaware State ===
Week Ten: Delaware State vs. #19 North Carolina A&T – Game Summary

Quarter	1	2	3	4	Total
Hornets	0	0	0	6	6
#19 Aggies	0	6	7	14	27

at Aggie Stadium, Greensboro, NC

- Date: November 14, 2015
- Game time: 1:00pm EDT
- Game weather: 55 °F (13 °C),
- Game attendance: 8,732
- Referee: Marcus Woods
- TV announcers (ESPN3): Jay Walker;

Game information

First quarter

-No Score-

Second quarter

- NCAT – Denzel Keyes 9 yard pass from Kylil Carter; Cody Jones PAT Blocked, 9:02 (NCAT 0–6)

Third quarter

- NCAT – Khris Gardin 35 yard pass from Kylil Carter, 7:06 (NCAT 0–13)

Fourth quarter

- DSU – Brycen Alleyne 4 yard run, 9:02 (NCAT 6–13)
- NCAT – Tony McCrae 75 yard kick return, 8:51 (NCAT 6–20)
- NCAT – Kylil Carter 1 yard run, 1:34 (NCAT 6–27)

Top Passer

- Kobie Lain (DSU) – 10/18, 144 YDS 0 TD, 2 INT

Top Rusher

- Tarik Cohen (NCAT) – 17 CAR, 135 YDS 0 TD

Top Receiver

- Aris Scott (DSU) – 5 REC, 80 YDS 0 TD

This game marked the 44th meeting between the A&T and Delaware State. Going into the game, Delaware State held a 22–21–1 all-time record against the Aggies, with A&T winning the last meeting 33–20.

The Aggies kept Delaware State scoreless until six minutes into the fourth quarter, leading 13–0. Delaware state's Brycen Alleyne scored on a four-yard run giving the Hornets their only points of the game. Following the hornet's kickoff, Senior Tony McRae returned the ball far a 75-yard touchdown. The Aggies were able to keep the hornets from scoring again after stopping quarterback Kobe Lain short on a 4th down run. The Aggies took over possession at their own 28-yard line and in 9 plays drove the ball 72 yards, with the drive ending in a touchdown.

=== North Carolina Central ===
Week Eleven: North Carolina Central vs. #16 North Carolina A&T – Game Summary

Quarter	1	2	3	4	Total
Eagles	0	7	7	7	21
#16 Aggies	0	3	7	6	16

at Aggie Stadium, Greensboro, NC

- Date: November 21, 2015
- Game time: 1:05pm EDT
- Game weather: 55 °F (13 °C), Sunny
- Game attendance: 18,409
- Referee: Andre Lowe
- TV: LTV
- http://www.ncataggies.com/pdf9/4151607.pdf

Game information

First quarter

Second quarter

- NCAT – Cody Jones 29 yard field goal, 8:38 (NCAT 0–3)
- NCCU – Malcolm Bell .3 yard run, 6:46 (NCCU 7–3)

Third quarter

- NCCU – LaVontis Smith 67 yard punt return, 6:17 (NCCU 14–3)
- NCAT – Tony Mcrae 90 yard kickoff return, 6:09 (NCCU 14–10)

Fourth quarter

- NCCU – Dorrel McClain 16 yard run, 14:07 (NCCU 21–10)
- NCAT – Dequan Swann 1 yard pass from Kylil Carter; PAT failed, 5:56 (NCAT 21–16)

Top Passer

- Malcolm Bell (NCCU) – 14/28, 200 YDS 0 TD, 1 INT

Top Rusher

- Dorrel McClain (NCCU) – 20 CAR, 167 YDS 1 TD

Top Receiver

- LaVontis Smith (NCCU) – 7 REC, 123 YDS 0 TD

This game marks the 87th meeting between A&T and arch rival North Carolina Central. Going into the game, the Aggies hold a 49–32–5 all-time record against the Eagles. In the 2014 Meeting between the two schools, the Eagles upset the Aggies 21–14, taking the outright MEAC championship from them and creating a 5-way tie which gave Morgan State the conference automatic bid to the NCAA playoffs. Going into the game, the Aggies ranked 13th in the FCS coaches poll, had allowed opponents only 73.7 rushing yards per game to top the NCAA Division I-FCS.

The Eagles amassed 393 yards of total offense, including 193 yards on the ground. With the loss to NCCU, the Aggies shared the MEAC Championship with their arch rival for the second year in a row.

=== Alcorn State – Celebration Bowl ===
2015 Air Force Reserve Celebration Bowl – Game Summary

Quarter	1	2	3	4	Total
Braves	6	7	7	14	34
#22 Aggies	21	3	3	14	41

at Georgia Dome, Atlanta, GA

- Date: Decemberber 19, 2015
- Game time: 12:00pm EDT
- Game weather: Played Indoors, Domed Stadium
- Game attendance: 35,528
- TV: ABC

Game information

First quarter

- NCAT – Khris Gardin 74 punt return, 13:36 (NCAT 0–7)
- ALCN – Anthony Williams Jr. 84 yard punt return (Brandon Vessell rush fumbled), 10:01 (NCAT 6–7)
- NCAT – Tarik Cohen 74 yard run, 7:44 (NCAT 6–14)
- NCAT – Tarik Cohen 83 yard run, 3:15 (NCAT 6–21)

Second quarter

- NCAT – Cody Jones 45 yard field goal, 11:31 (NCAT 6–24)
- ALCN – Arron Baker 10 yard pass from Lenorr Footman, 5:16 (NCAT 13–24)

Third quarter

- NCAT – Cody Jones 43 yard field goal, 10:12 (NCAT 13–27)
- ALCN – Lenorr Footman 9 yard pass from Tollette George, 6:35 (NCAT 20–27)

Fourth quarter

- ALCN – Tollette George 11 yard pass from Lenorr Footman, 12:57 (TIE 27–27)
- NCAT – Kwashaun Quick 1 yard run, 10:17 (NCAT 27–34)
- ALCN – Brandon Campbell 3 yard pass from Brandon Vessell, 5:10 (TIE 34–34)
- NCAT – Tarik Cohen 73 yard run, 4:17 (NCAT 34–41)

Top Passer

- Kwashaun Quick (NCAT) – 11/16, 144 YDS 0 TD, 0 INT

Top Rusher

- Tarik Cohen (NCAT) – 22 CAR, 295 YDS 3 TD

Top Receiver

- Tollette George (ALCN) – 6 REC, 63 YDS 1 TD

This game marks the inaugural Celebration Bowl Game, and only the 2nd meeting between the Aggies and Alcorn State. In their 2004 meeting, the Aggies lost to the Braves 13–15 in Lorman, MS. By virtue of the MEAC tiebreaker system, the Aggies were invited to the Celebration bowl vs Alcorn State, who defeated Grambling State in the 2015 SWAC championship game.

The game's first quarter showcased both Alcorn and A&T's special teams. A&T punt returner Khris Gardin scoring the first touchdown of the game with at 74-yard return from Alcorn's 26-yard line. Alcorn's game, Anthony Williams returned the favor moments later with an 84-yard punt return to pull Alcorn State within 7–6. Running Back Tarik Cohen made scoring runs of 74 and 83 yards out of the Aggies' next two possessions, and A&T pushed its lead to 24–6 when Kicker Cody Jones was completed a 45-yard field goal with 11:31 left in the first half. Tarik Cohen was able to drive a 73-yard touchdown with 4:17 left in the game to put A&T up by 7. Alcorn then attempted 4 passes from A&T's 9-yard line in the final possession of the game to all come up incomplete, giving A&T the first ever Celebration Bowl victory.

Tarik Cohen and Lineman Denzel Jones were named offensive and defensive most valuable players. Cohen rushed for 295 yards, recording his fourth career 200-yard rushing performance and 3rd best single game performance in A&T history. He now ties Maurice Hicks for the most 200-yard plus games in an Aggies career. Additionally, Cohen's performance has helped him set a new School record for most rushing yards in a single season with 1,543 and 15 Touchdowns. on the defensive side, Jones had 7 tackles and 1 interception. Khris Gardin's performance helped him break the NCAA FCS records for punt return yards in season with 740 punt return yards. Additionally His 61.7 punt return yards per game is also a new NCAA record. Aggies junior kicker Cody Jones made two field goals from 40 yards or more. It is the first time in his career he has accomplished the feat. He has made five kicks in his career of 40 yards or more. The Aggies are now 13–12 all-time against the SWAC, and the teams' 543 yards of total offense are the most the Aggies have compiled in the five-year Broadway era.

== Postseason ==
As the 2015 college football season neared the end, many organizations began to announce finalists and winners of various past-season awards. Aggie players and coaches appeared on many of these lists. Several players for the Aggies were honored with awards and accolades including Junior running back Tarik Cohen, Redshirt Sophomore Offensive Lineman Brandon Parker, and Sophomore punt returner Khris Gardin.

Cohen was named MEAC Offensive player of the year for the second year in a row. He is the first Aggie football player since Connell Maynor to win back-to-back offensive player of the year awards. Cohen led the MEAC in rushing and recorded his third straight 1,000 yard season with 1,248 total yards. Parker was named MEAC Offensive Lineman of the year and is only the second Aggie in school history win the award, following Qasim Mitchell, who claimed the award in 2001. Parker did not allow a single sack from his left tackle position through 11 games and only had two penalties called against him this season while registering 4.32 pancake blocks per game. The offensive line accounted for 3,902 total offensive yards including 1,960 yards on the ground, making the Aggies the second-best rushing offense in the MEAC.

Gardin received All-American honors from STATS FCS (first team), BOXTOROW, and the FCS Athletics Directors Association. Additionally, he was also named first-team All-MEAC as a return specialist. Gardin, who also holds the school record for punt returns in a season, set a new NCAA FCS records for punt return yards in both a single season and also average punt return yards per game, is the first first-team All-American punt returner for the Aggies since Curtis Deloatch in 2001.

The following A&T players were also named to the All–MEAC First, Second, and Third Teams:

All-MEAC First Team
- Tarik Cohen, Jr., RB
- Khris Gardin, So., RS
- Tony McRae, Sr., DB
- Brandon Parker, R-So., OL
- Marquis Ragland, R-Jr., DL

All-MEAC Second Team
- Denzel Jones, R-Sr., LB
- Angelo Keyes, R-Fr., DL
- Denzel Keyes, Jr., WR

All-MEAC Third Team
- Marquis Boyan, Sr. DB
- Michael Neal, Sr. DL

=== 2016 NFL draft ===
The 2016 NFL draft was held on April 28–30, 2017 at the Auditorium Theater and Grant Park in Chicago, Illinois. The following A&T players were either selected or signed as undrafted free agents following the draft.

Player	Position	Round	Overall pick	NFL team
Tony McRae	CB	—-	Undrafted FA	Oakland Raiders

=== 2016 CFL draft ===
The 2016 CFL draft took place on May 10, 2016. The following A&T players were either selected or signed as undrafted free agents following the draft.

Player	Position	Round	Overall pick	CFL team
Kevin Francis	LB	—-	Supplemental Pick	Saskatchewan Roughriders (Note: The Saskatchewan Roughriders forfeited their 3rd round selection in the 2017 CFL draft when they took Kevin Francis in the 2016 Supplemental Draft.)

== Ranking movements ==
Ranking movements Legend: ██ Increase in ranking ██ Decrease in ranking — = Not ranked RV = Received votes ( ) = First-place votes
	Week													
Poll	Pre	1	2	3	4	5	6	7	8	9	10	11	12	Final
STATS FCS	RV	RV	RV	RV	RV	RV	RV	24	20	19	19	16	22	21
Coaches	RV	—	RV	RV	RV	RV	RV	24	20	16	14	13	20	21
Sheridan	2 (7)	2 (10)	2 (11)	2 (10)	2 (10)	2 (10)	2 (10)	1 (19)	1					1 (21)
BoxtoRow	2 (3)	1 (5)	2 (3)	2	2 (2)	2 (18)	2 (20)	1 (18)	1 (20)	1	1	1	5	1 (21)
