= 2015 Morgan State Bears football team =

American college football season

2015 Morgan State Bears football
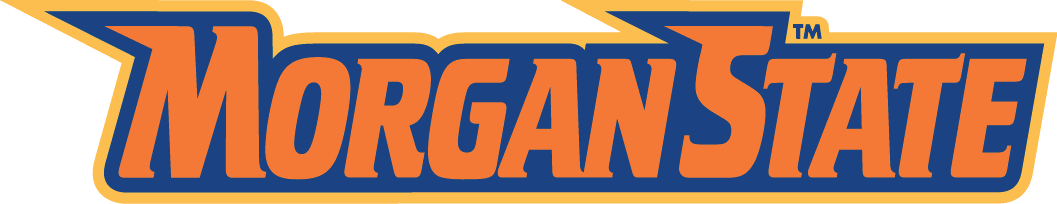
- Conference: Mid-Eastern Athletic Conference
- Record: 4–6 (4–4 MEAC)
- Head coach: Lee Hull (2nd season)
- Offensive coordinator: Fred Farrier (2nd season)
- Home stadium: Hughes Stadium

2015 Mid-Eastern Athletic Conference football standings
	Conf.			Overall
Team	W		L	W		L
No. 21 North Carolina A&T +	7	–	1	10	–	2
Bethune–Cookman +	7	–	1	9	–	2
North Carolina Central +	7	–	1	8	–	3
South Carolina State	6	–	2	7	–	4
Hampton	5	–	3	6	–	5
Morgan State	4	–	4	4	–	6
Norfolk State	4	–	4	4	–	7
Savannah State *	1	–	7	1	–	9
Delaware State	1	–	7	1	–	10
Florida A&M *	1	–	7	1	–	10
Howard	1	–	7	1	–	10
+ – Conference co-champions; Florida A&M and Savannah State ineligible for postseason due to APR violations; Rankings from STATS Poll

The 2015 Morgan State Bears football team represented Morgan State University in the 2015 NCAA Division I FCS football season. They were led by second-year head coach Lee Hull and played their home games at Hughes Stadium. Morgan State was a member of the Mid-Eastern Athletic Conference(MEAC). They finished the season 4–6, 4–4 in MEAC play to finish in a tie for sixth place.

On February 8, 2016, Hull resigned to become the wide receivers coach for the Indianapolis Colts of the National Football League (NFL). He finished at Morgan State with a two-year record of 12–12.

== Schedule ==
Date	Time	Opponent	Site	TV	Result	Attendance
September 5	3:30 pm	at Air Force*	Falcon Stadium; Colorado Springs, CO	RTRM	L 7–63	33,734
September 12	6:30 pm	at Illinois State*	Hancock Stadium; Normal, IL	ESPN3	L 14–67	13,391
September 19	4:00 pm	Virginia–Lynchburg±*	Hughes Stadium; Baltimore, MD		W 61–0	3,763
September 26	4:30 pm	vs. Howard	Soldier Field; Chicago, IL (Chicago Football Classic, rivalry)	ESPN3	W 21–13	61,500
October 3	2:00 pm	at Delaware State	Alumni Stadium; Dover, DE		W 26–6	1,528
October 10	4:00 pm	Savannah State	Hughes Stadium; Baltimore, MD		W 42–3	2,479
October 17	1:00 pm	Hampton^{†}	Hughes Stadium; Baltimore, MD		L 10–20	7,749
October 24	2:00 pm	at North Carolina Central	O'Kelly–Riddick Stadium; Durham, NC		L 17–20	4,336
November 7	4:00 pm	at Bethune–Cookman	Municipal Stadium; Daytona Beach, FL		L 14–38	7,461
November 14	1:00 pm	Florida A&M	Hughes Stadium; Baltimore, MD		W 21–7	1,167
November 21	1:00 pm	Norfolk State	Hughes Stadium; Baltimore, MD		L 10–17	1,007
*Non-conference game; ^{†}Homecoming; All times are in Eastern time

- Source: Schedule

± Virginia-Lynchburg didn't meet NCAA accreditation guidelines and all stats and records from this game do not count.
