= 2015 South Carolina State Bulldogs football team =

American college football season

2015 South Carolina State Bulldogs football
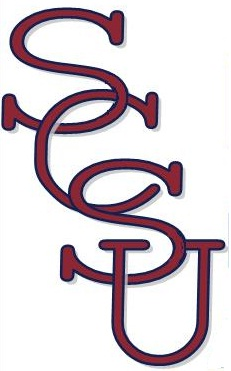
- Conference: Mid-Eastern Athletic Conference
- Record: 7–4 (6–2 MEAC)
- Head coach: Oliver Pough (14th season)
- Offensive coordinator: Joseph Blackwell (7th season)
- Defensive coordinator: Mike Adams (8th season)
- Home stadium: Oliver C. Dawson Stadium

2015 Mid-Eastern Athletic Conference football standings
	Conf.			Overall
Team	W		L	W		L
No. 21 North Carolina A&T +	7	–	1	10	–	2
Bethune–Cookman +	7	–	1	9	–	2
North Carolina Central +	7	–	1	8	–	3
South Carolina State	6	–	2	7	–	4
Hampton	5	–	3	6	–	5
Morgan State	4	–	4	4	–	6
Norfolk State	4	–	4	4	–	7
Savannah State *	1	–	7	1	–	9
Delaware State	1	–	7	1	–	10
Florida A&M *	1	–	7	1	–	10
Howard	1	–	7	1	–	10
+ – Conference co-champions; Florida A&M and Savannah State ineligible for postseason due to APR violations; Rankings from STATS Poll

The 2015 South Carolina State Bulldogs football team represented South Carolina State University in the 2015 NCAA Division I FCS football season. They were led by 14th year head coach Oliver Pough and played their home games at Oliver C. Dawson Stadium. They were a member of the Mid-Eastern Athletic Conference. They finished the season 7–4, 6–2 in MEAC play to finish in fourth place.

== Schedule ==
Date	Time	Opponent	Site	TV	Result	Attendance
September 6	3:30 pm	vs. Arkansas–Pine Bluff*	Orlando Citrus Bowl Stadium; Orlando, FL (MEAC/SWAC Challenge)	ESPN	W 35–7	7,257
September 12	6:00 pm	No. 3 Coastal Carolina*	Oliver C. Dawson Stadium; Orangeburg, SC		L 14–41	12,023
September 17	7:30 pm	Florida A&M	Oliver C. Dawson Stadium; Orangeburg, SC	ESPNU	W 36–0	14,397
October 3	7:00 pm	at Furman*	Paladin Stadium; Greenville, NC	ESPN3	L 3–17	1,022
October 8	7:30 pm	at Bethune-Cookman	Municipal Stadium; Daytona Beach, FL	ESPNU	L 14–17	7,462
October 17	2:00 pm	Howard	Oliver C. Dawson Stadium; Orangeburg, SC		W 49–10	16,033
October 24	2:00 pm	at Delaware State	Alumni Stadium; Dover, DE		W 34–7	5,388
October 31	1:30 pm	Hampton^{†}	Oliver C. Dawson Stadium; Orangeburg, SC		W 34–20	19,821
November 7	1:30 pm	No. 19 North Carolina A&T	Oliver C. Dawson Stadium; Orangeburg, SC (rivalry)		L 6–9	15,283
November 14	1:00 pm	at Norfolk State	William "Dick" Price Stadium; Norfolk, VA		W 17–10	4,959
November 21	1:00 pm	at Savannah State	Ted Wright Stadium; Savannah, GA		W 52–29	2,900
*Non-conference game; ^{†}Homecoming; Rankings from STATS Poll released prior to the game; All times are in Eastern time
