= 2015 Delaware State Hornets football team =

American college football season

2015 Delaware State Hornets football
- Conference: Mid-Eastern Athletic Conference
- Record: 1–10 (1–7 MEAC)
- Head coach: Kenny Carter (1st season)
- Offensive coordinator: John Allen (1st season)
- Defensive coordinator: Jamie Bryant (1st season)
- Home stadium: Alumni Stadium

2015 Mid-Eastern Athletic Conference football standings
	Conf.			Overall
Team	W		L	W		L
No. 21 North Carolina A&T +	7	–	1	10	–	2
Bethune–Cookman +	7	–	1	9	–	2
North Carolina Central +	7	–	1	8	–	3
South Carolina State	6	–	2	7	–	4
Hampton	5	–	3	6	–	5
Morgan State	4	–	4	4	–	6
Norfolk State	4	–	4	4	–	7
Savannah State *	1	–	7	1	–	9
Delaware State	1	–	7	1	–	10
Florida A&M *	1	–	7	1	–	10
Howard	1	–	7	1	–	10
+ – Conference co-champions; Florida A&M and Savannah State ineligible for postseason due to APR violations; Rankings from STATS Poll

The 2015 Delaware State Hornets football team represented Delaware State University as a member of the Mid-Eastern Athletic Conference (MEAC) in the 2015 NCAA Division I FCS football season. Led by first-year head coach Kenny Carter, the Hornets compiled an overall record of 1–10 with a mark of 1–7 in conference play, placing in a four-way tie for eighth at the bottom of the MEAC standings. Delaware State played home games at Alumni Stadium in Dover, Delaware.

On January 21, 2015, Delaware State announced Carter as the team's new head coach.

== Schedule ==
Date	Time	Opponent	Site	TV	Result	Attendance
September 5	7:00 pm	at No. 15 Liberty*	Williams Stadium; Lynchburg, VA	LFSN	L 13–32	18,803
September 12	6:00 pm	at Kent State*	Dix Stadium; Kent, OH	ESPN3	L 13–45	15,091
September 19	2:00 pm	Chowan*	Alumni Stadium; Dover, DE		L 30–31	1,995
October 3	2:00 pm	Morgan State	Alumni Stadium; Dover, DE		L 6–26	1,528
October 10	2:00 pm	at Hampton	Armstrong Stadium; Hampton, VA		L 7–21	7,010
October 17	3:00 pm	at Florida A&M	Bragg Memorial Stadium; Tallahassee, FL		L 13–41	22,678
October 24	2:00 pm	South Carolina State^{†}	Alumni Stadium; Dover, DE		L 7–34	5,388
October 31	2:00 pm	Bethune-Cookman	Alumni Stadium; Dover, DE		L 21–49	1,283
November 7	2:00 pm	at North Carolina Central	O'Kelly–Riddick Stadium; Durham, NC		L 10–43	3,051
November 14	1:00 pm	at No. 19 North Carolina A&T	Aggie Stadium; Greensboro, NC	ESPN3	L 6–27	8,732
November 21	2:00 pm	Howard	Alumni Stadium; Dover, DE		W 32–31	1,983
*Non-conference game; ^{†}Homecoming; Rankings from STATS Poll released prior to the game; All times are in Eastern time
