= 2015 Savannah State Tigers football team =

American college football season

2015 Savannah State Tigers football
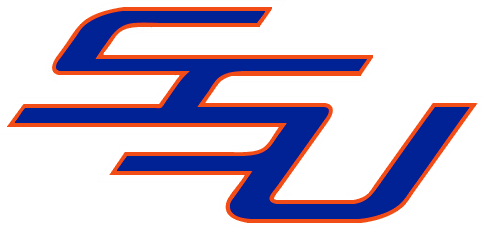
- Conference: Mid-Eastern Athletic Conference
- Record: 1–9 (1–7 MEAC)
- Head coach: Earnest Wilson (3rd season)
- Offensive coordinator: Andy Siegal (1st season)
- Offensive scheme: Multiple
- Defensive coordinator: Michael Wallace (1st season)
- Base defense: 4–3
- Home stadium: Ted A. Wright Stadium

2015 Mid-Eastern Athletic Conference football standings
	Conf.			Overall
Team	W		L	W		L
No. 21 North Carolina A&T +	7	–	1	10	–	2
Bethune–Cookman +	7	–	1	9	–	2
North Carolina Central +	7	–	1	8	–	3
South Carolina State	6	–	2	7	–	4
Hampton	5	–	3	6	–	5
Morgan State	4	–	4	4	–	6
Norfolk State	4	–	4	4	–	7
Savannah State *	1	–	7	1	–	9
Delaware State	1	–	7	1	–	10
Florida A&M *	1	–	7	1	–	10
Howard	1	–	7	1	–	10
+ – Conference co-champions; Florida A&M and Savannah State ineligible for postseason due to APR violations; Rankings from STATS Poll

The 2015 Savannah State Tigers football team represented Savannah State University in the 2015 NCAA Division I FCS football season. The Tigers were members of the Mid-Eastern Athletic Conference (MEAC). This was their third season under the guidance of head coach Earnest Wilson and the Tigers played their home games at Ted Wright Stadium. They finished the season 1–9, 1–7 in MEAC play to finish in a tie for eighth place.

On February 17, head coach Earnest Wilson resigned to become the head coach at Elizabeth City State. He finished at Savannah State with a three-year record of 2–32.

== Schedule ==
Date	Time	Opponent	Site	TV	Result	Attendance
September 5	4:00 pm	at Colorado State*	Hughes Stadium; Fort Collins, CO		L 13–65	24,571
September 19	12:00 pm	at Akron*	InfoCision Stadium; Akron, OH	ESPN3	L 9–52	16,763
September 26	4:00 pm	at Bethune-Cookman	Municipal Stadium; Daytona Beach, FL		L 12–42	5,975
October 3	7:00 pm	Florida A&M	Ted Wright Stadium; Savannah, GA		W 37–27	4,679
October 10	4:00 pm	at Morgan State	Hughes Stadium; Baltimore, MD		L 3–42	2,479
October 17	2:00 pm	North Carolina Central^{†}	Ted Wright Stadium; Savannah, GA		L 22–39	5,649
October 31	1:00 pm	at Howard	William H. Greene Stadium; Washington, D.C.		L 9–55	1,056
November 7	2:00 pm	at Norfolk State	William "Dick" Price Stadium; Norfolk, VA		L 17–20 ^{OT}	10,744
November 14	1:00 pm	Hampton	Ted Wright Stadium; Savannah, GA		L 3–42	2,940
November 21	1:00 pm	South Carolina State	Ted Wright Stadium; Savannah, GA		L 29–52	2,900
*Non-conference game; ^{†}Homecoming; All times are in Eastern time

== Coaching staff ==
Name	Type	College	Graduating year
Earnest Wilson III	Head coach		
Michael Wallace	Defensive coordinator/safeties coach		
Andy Siegal	Offensive coordinator/running backs coach		
Nate Baker	Cornerbacks coach		
Donovan Jackson	Offensive line coach		
Thomas Sims	Defensive line coach		
Russell DeMasi	Quarterbacks coach		
Tony Pierce	Linebackers Coach/ special teams coordinator		
Paul Humphries	Outside receivers coach		
Courtney Williams	Inside receivers coach		
