= 2015 Norfolk State Spartans football team =

American college football season

2015 Norfolk State Spartans football
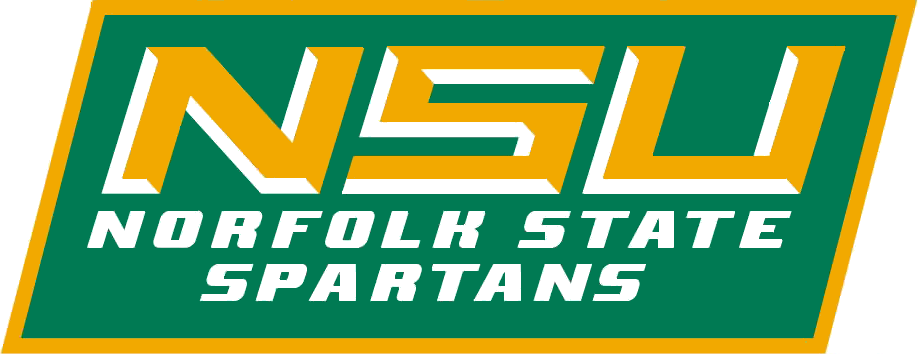
- Conference: Mid-Eastern Athletic Conference
- Record: 4–7 (4–4 MEAC)
- Head coach: Latrell Scott (1st season)
- Defensive coordinator: Jerry Holmes (1st season)
- Home stadium: William "Dick" Price Stadium

2015 Mid-Eastern Athletic Conference football standings
	Conf.			Overall
Team	W		L	W		L
No. 21 North Carolina A&T +	7	–	1	10	–	2
Bethune–Cookman +	7	–	1	9	–	2
North Carolina Central +	7	–	1	8	–	3
South Carolina State	6	–	2	7	–	4
Hampton	5	–	3	6	–	5
Morgan State	4	–	4	4	–	6
Norfolk State	4	–	4	4	–	7
Savannah State *	1	–	7	1	–	9
Delaware State	1	–	7	1	–	10
Florida A&M *	1	–	7	1	–	10
Howard	1	–	7	1	–	10
+ – Conference co-champions; Florida A&M and Savannah State ineligible for postseason due to APR violations; Rankings from STATS Poll

The 2015 Norfolk State Spartans football team represented Norfolk State University in the 2015 NCAA Division I FCS football season. They were led by first-year head coach Latrell Scott and played their home games at William "Dick" Price Stadium. They were a member of the Mid-Eastern Athletic Conference (MEAC). They finished the season 4–7, 4–4 in MEAC play to finish in a tie for sixth place.

== Schedule ==
Date	Time	Opponent	Site	TV	Result	Attendance
September 5	12:00 pm	at Rutgers*	High Point Solutions Stadium; Piscataway, NJ	ESPNews	L 13–63	47,453
September 12	7:00 pm	at Old Dominion*	Foreman Field; Norfolk, VA (Rivalry)	ASN	L 10–24	20,118
September 19	3:30 pm	at Marshall*	Joan C. Edwards Stadium; Huntington, WV	ASN	L 7–45	24,114
September 26	4:00 pm	Hampton	William "Dick" Price Stadium; Norfolk, VA (Battle of the Bay)	SSC	W 24–14	6,549
October 3	1:00 pm	at Howard	William H. Greene Stadium; Washington, D.C.		W 15–12	6,088
October 10	2:00 pm	North Carolina A&T	William "Dick" Price Stadium; Norfolk, VA	SSC	L 3–27	6,194
October 24	4:00 pm	at Bethune-Cookman	Municipal Stadium; Daytona Beach, FL		L 49–59	9,875
October 31	2:00 pm	at North Carolina Central	O'Kelly–Riddick Stadium; Durham, NC		L 16–24	11,965
November 7	2:00 pm	Savannah State^{†}	William "Dick" Price Stadium; Norfolk, VA	SSC	W 20–17 ^{OT}	10,744
November 14	1:00 pm	South Carolina State	William "Dick" Price Stadium; Norfolk, VA	SSC	L 10–17	4,959
November 21	1:00 pm	at Morgan State	Hughes Stadium; Baltimore, MD		W 17–10	1,007
*Non-conference game; ^{†}Homecoming; All times are in Eastern time

- Source: Schedule
