= 2015 Howard Bison football team =

American college football season

2015 Howard Bison football
- Conference: Mid-Eastern Athletic Conference
- Record: 1–10 (1–7 MEAC)
- Head coach: Gary Harrell (4th season)
- Offensive coordinator: Ted White (5th season)
- Defensive coordinator: Rayford Petty (5th season)
- Home stadium: William H. Greene Stadium

2015 Mid-Eastern Athletic Conference football standings
	Conf.			Overall
Team	W		L	W		L
No. 21 North Carolina A&T +	7	–	1	10	–	2
Bethune–Cookman +	7	–	1	9	–	2
North Carolina Central +	7	–	1	8	–	3
South Carolina State	6	–	2	7	–	4
Hampton	5	–	3	6	–	5
Morgan State	4	–	4	4	–	6
Norfolk State	4	–	4	4	–	7
Savannah State *	1	–	7	1	–	9
Delaware State	1	–	7	1	–	10
Florida A&M *	1	–	7	1	–	10
Howard	1	–	7	1	–	10
+ – Conference co-champions; Florida A&M and Savannah State ineligible for postseason due to APR violations; Rankings from STATS Poll

The 2015 Howard Bison football team represented Howard University as a member of the Mid-Eastern Athletic Conference (MEAC) during the 2015 NCAA Division I FCS football season. Led by fourth-year head coach Gary Harrell, the Bison compiled an overall record of 1–10 with a mark of 1–7, placing in a four-way tie for eighth in the MEAC. Howard played home games at William H. Greene Stadium in Washington, D.C.

== Schedule ==
Date	Time	Opponent	Site	TV	Result	Attendance
September 5	3:30 pm	at Appalachian State*	Kidd Brewer Stadium; Boone, NC	ESPN3	L 0–49	24,314
September 12	1:00 pm	at Boston College*	Alumni Stadium; Chestnut Hill, MA	ESPN3	L 0–76	26,132
September 18	7:30 pm	vs. Hampton	Robert F. Kennedy Memorial Stadium; Washington, DC (Nation's Football Classic, The Real HU)	ESPNU	L 19–37	16,342
September 26	4:30 pm	vs. Morgan State	Soldier Field; Chicago, IL (Chicago Football Classic, rivalry)	ESPN3	L 13–21	61,500
October 3	1:00 pm	Norfolk State^{†}	William H. Greene Stadium; Washington, DC		L 12–15	6,088
October 17	2:00 pm	at South Carolina State	Oliver C. Dawson Stadium; Orangeburg, SC		L 10–49	16,033
October 24	1:00 pm	at No. 24 North Carolina A&T	Aggie Stadium; Greensboro, NC		L 14–65	21,500
October 31	1:00 pm	Savannah State	William H. Greene Stadium; Washington, DC		W 55–9	1,056
November 7	1:00 pm	at Stony Brook*	Kenneth P. LaValle Stadium; Stony Brook, NY		L 9–14	5,109
November 14	1:00 pm	North Carolina Central	William H. Greene Stadium; Washington, DC		L 6–41	3,072
November 21	2:00 pm	at Delaware State	Alumni Stadium; Dover, DE		L 31–32	1,983
*Non-conference game; ^{†}Homecoming; Rankings from STATS Poll released prior to the game; All times are in Eastern time
