= 2015 Florida A&M Rattlers football team =

American college football season

2015 Florida A&M Rattlers football
- Conference: Mid-Eastern Athletic Conference
- Record: 1–10 (1–7 MEAC)
- Head coach: Alex Wood (1st season)
- Offensive coordinator: Martin Spieler (1st season)
- Defensive coordinator: Theo Lemon (1st season)
- Home stadium: Bragg Memorial Stadium

2015 Mid-Eastern Athletic Conference football standings
	Conf.			Overall
Team	W		L	W		L
No. 21 North Carolina A&T +	7	–	1	10	–	2
Bethune–Cookman +	7	–	1	9	–	2
North Carolina Central +	7	–	1	8	–	3
South Carolina State	6	–	2	7	–	4
Hampton	5	–	3	6	–	5
Morgan State	4	–	4	4	–	6
Norfolk State	4	–	4	4	–	7
Savannah State *	1	–	7	1	–	9
Delaware State	1	–	7	1	–	10
Florida A&M *	1	–	7	1	–	10
Howard	1	–	7	1	–	10
+ – Conference co-champions; Florida A&M and Savannah State ineligible for postseason due to APR violations; Rankings from STATS Poll

The 2015 Florida A&M Rattlers football team represented Florida A&M University in the 2015 NCAA Division I FCS football season. The Rattlers were led by first-year head coach Alex Wood. They played their home games at Bragg Memorial Stadium. They were a member of the Mid-Eastern Athletic Conference (MEAC). They finished the season 1–10, 1–7 in MEAC play to finish in a four way tie for eighth place. The Rattlers were ineligible to participate in post season play to due Academic Progress Rate violations.

== Schedule ==
Date	Time	Opponent	Site	TV	Result	Attendance
September 5	7:00 pm	at South Florida*	Raymond James Stadium; Tampa, FL	ESPN3	L 3–51	30,434
September 12	2:00 pm	at Samford*	Seibert Stadium; Homewood, AL	ESPN3	L 21–58	4,714
September 17	7:30 pm	at South Carolina State	Oliver C. Dawson Stadium; Orangeburg, SC	ESPNU	L 0–36	14,397
September 26	6:00 pm	Tennessee State*	Bragg Memorial Stadium; Tallahassee, FL	RV	L 14–30	18,020
October 3	7:00 pm	at Savannah State	Ted Wright Stadium; Savannah, GA		L 27–37	4,679
October 10	4:00 pm	North Carolina Central	Bragg Memorial Stadium; Tallahassee, FL	RV	L 24–27	9,263
October 17	3:00 pm	Delaware State^{†}	Bragg Memorial Stadium; Tallahassee, FL	RV	W 41–13	22,678
October 31	3:00 pm	No. 20 North Carolina A&T	Bragg Memorial Stadium; Tallahassee, FL	RV	L 10–28	10,279
November 7	1:00 pm	at Hampton	Armstrong Stadium; Hampton, VA		L 0–33	2,211
November 14	1:00 pm	at Morgan State	Hughes Stadium; Baltimore, MD		L 7–21	1,167
November 21	2:30 pm	vs. Bethune-Cookman	Florida Citrus Bowl Stadium; Orlando, FL (Florida Classic)	ESPN Classic	L 14–35	45,728
*Non-conference game; ^{†}Homecoming; Rankings from STATS Poll released prior to the game; All times are in Eastern time

- Source: Schedule

== Game summaries ==
=== @ South Florida ===
Florida A&M @ South Florida

Team	1	2	3	4	Total
Rattlers	0	0	3	0	3
• Bulls	3	13	14	21	51

- Date: September 5
- Location: Raymond James Stadium
  Tampa, FL
- Game start: 7:00 PM EDT
- Game attendance: 30,434
- Television network: ESPN3

=== @ Samford ===
Florida A&M @ Samford

Team	1	2	3	4	Total
Rattlers	14	0	0	7	21
• Bulldogs	10	31	10	7	58

- Date: September 12
- Location: Seibert Stadium
  Homewood, AL
- Game start: 2:00 PM EDT
- Game attendance: 4,714
- Television network: ESPN3

=== @ South Carolina State ===
Florida A&M @ South Carolina State

Team	1	2	3	4	Total
Rattlers	0	0	0	0	0
• Bulldogs	10	6	7	13	36

- Date: September 17
- Location: Oliver C. Dawson Stadium
  Orangeburg, SC
- Game start: 7:30 PM EDT
- Game attendance: 14,397
- Television network: ESPNU

=== Tennessee State ===
Tennessee State @ Florida A&M

Team	1	2	3	4	Total
• TSU Tigers	0	7	9	14	30
Rattlers	0	7	7	0	14

- Date: September 26
- Location: Bragg Memorial Stadium
  Tallahassee, FL
- Game start: 6:00 PM EDT
- Game attendance: 18,020

=== @ Savannah State ===
Florida A&M @ Savannah State

Team	1	2	3	4	Total
Rattlers	7	0	13	7	27
• SSU Tigers	16	14	7	0	37

- Date: October 3
- Location: Ted Wright Stadium
  Savannah, GA
- Game start: 7:00 PM EDT
- Game attendance: 4,679

=== North Carolina Central ===
North Carolina Central @ Florida A&M

Team	1	2	3	4	Total
• Eagles	10	7	0	10	27
Rattlers	3	14	7	0	24

- Date: October 10
- Location: Bragg Memorial Stadium
  Tallahassee, FL
- Game start: 4:00 PM EDT
- Game attendance: 9,263

=== Delaware State ===
Delaware State @ Florida A&M

Team	1	2	3	4	Total
Hornets	7	0	0	6	13
• Rattlers	7	10	10	14	41

- Date: October 17
- Location: Bragg Memorial Stadium
  Tallahassee, FL
- Game start: 3:00 PM EDT
- Game attendance: 22,678

=== North Carolina A&T ===
#20 North Carolina A&T @ Florida A&M

Team	1	2	3	4	Total
• #20 Aggies	14	7	7	0	28
Rattlers	0	0	7	3	10

- Date: October 31
- Location: Bragg Memorial Stadium
  Tallahassee, FL
- Game start: 3:00 PM EDT
- Game attendance: 10,279

=== @ Hampton ===
Florida A&M @ Hampton

Team	1	2	3	4	Total
Rattlers	0	0	0	0	0
• Pirates	3	14	3	13	33

- Date: November 7
- Location: Armstrong Stadium
  Hampton, VA
- Game start: 1:00 PM EST
- Game attendance: 2,211

=== @ Morgan State ===
Florida A&M @ Morgan State

Team	1	2	3	4	Total
Rattlers	0	7	0	0	7
• Bears	0	7	7	7	21

- Date: November 14
- Location: Hughes Stadium
  Baltimore, MD
- Game start: 1:00 PM EST
- Game attendance: 1,167

=== vs Bethune-Cookman ===
Bethune-Cookman vs Florida A&M

Team	1	2	3	4	Total
• Wildcats	14	7	7	7	35
Rattlers	0	14	0	0	14

- Date: November 21
- Location: Florida Citrus Bowl Stadium
  Orlando, FL
- Game start: 2:30 PM EST
- Game attendance: 45,728
- Television network: ESPN Classic
