= 2015 Hampton Pirates football team =

American college football season

2015 Hampton Pirates football
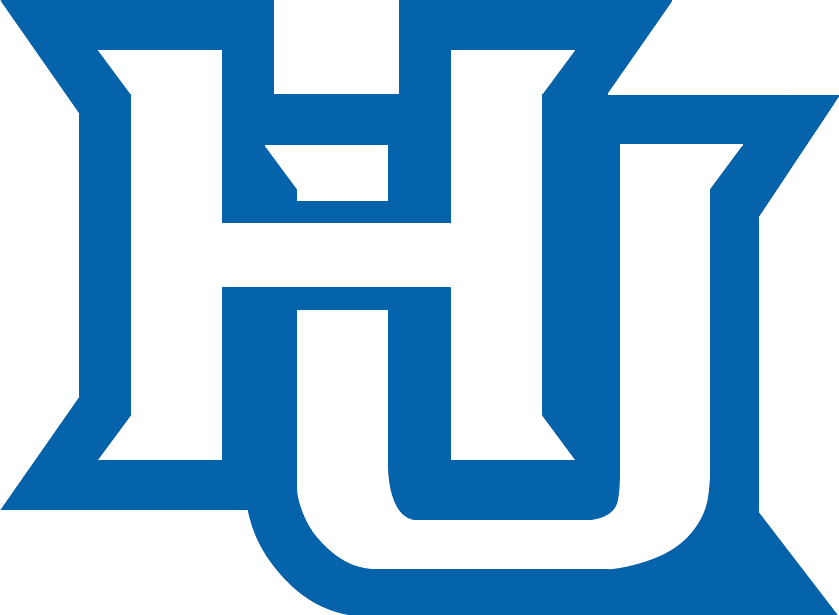
- Conference: Mid-Eastern Athletic Conference
- Record: 6–5 (5–3 MEAC)
- Head coach: Connell Maynor (2nd season)
- Defensive coordinator: Mike Ketchum (1st season)
- Home stadium: Armstrong Stadium

2015 Mid-Eastern Athletic Conference football standings
	Conf.			Overall
Team	W		L	W		L
No. 21 North Carolina A&T +	7	–	1	10	–	2
Bethune–Cookman +	7	–	1	9	–	2
North Carolina Central +	7	–	1	8	–	3
South Carolina State	6	–	2	7	–	4
Hampton	5	–	3	6	–	5
Morgan State	4	–	4	4	–	6
Norfolk State	4	–	4	4	–	7
Savannah State *	1	–	7	1	–	9
Delaware State	1	–	7	1	–	10
Florida A&M *	1	–	7	1	–	10
Howard	1	–	7	1	–	10
+ – Conference co-champions; Florida A&M and Savannah State ineligible for postseason due to APR violations; Rankings from STATS Poll

The 2015 Hampton Pirates football team represented Hampton University in the 2015 NCAA Division I FCS football season. They were led by second year head coach Connell Maynor and played their home games at Armstrong Stadium. They were a member of the Mid-Eastern Athletic Conference. They finished the season 6–5, 5–3 in MEAC play to finish in fifth place.

== Schedule ==
Date	Time	Opponent	Site	TV	Result	Attendance
September 5	6:00 pm	Kentucky State*	Armstrong Stadium; Hampton, VA	PTV	W 35–20	6,354
September 12	6:00 pm	No. 22 Richmond*	Armstrong Stadium; Hampton, VA	PTV	L 28–31	3,515
September 18	7:30 pm	vs. Howard	RFK Stadium; Washington, D.C. (Nation's Football Classic/Battle of "The Real HU")	ESPNU	W 37–19	16,342
September 26	4:00 pm	at Norfolk State	William "Dick" Price Stadium; Norfolk, VA (Battle of the Bay)		L 14–24	6,549
October 3	1:00 pm	North Carolina A&T	Armstrong Stadium; Hampton, VA	PTV	L 31–45	2,139
October 10	2:00 pm	Delaware State^{†}	Armstrong Stadium; Hampton, VA	PTV	W 21–7	7,010
October 17	1:00 pm	at Morgan State	Hughes Stadium; Baltimore, MD		W 20–10	7,749
October 24	3:30 pm	at No. 17 William & Mary*	Zable Stadium; Williamsburg, VA		L 7–40	11,736
October 31	1:30 pm	at South Carolina State	Oliver C. Dawson Stadium; Orangeburg, SC		L 20–34	19,821
November 7	1:00 pm	Florida A&M	Armstrong Stadium; Hampton, VA	PTV	W 33–0	2,211
November 14	1:00 pm	at Savannah State	Ted Wright Stadium; Savannah, GA		W 42–3	2,940
*Non-conference game; ^{†}Homecoming; Rankings from STATS Poll released prior to the game; All times are in Eastern time

- Source: Schedule
