= Celebration Bowl =

Annual American college football postseason game

- Cricket Celebration Bowl
- HBCU Football National Championship
- Stadium: Mercedes-Benz Stadium
- Location: Atlanta, Georgia
- Previous stadiums: Georgia Dome (2015–2016)
- Operated: 2015–present
- Conference tie-ins: MEAC, SWAC
- Payout: US$2 million ($1M per conference)
- Website: thecelebrationbowl.com
- Preceded by: Pelican Bowl (1972, 1974–1975); Heritage Bowl (1991–1999)

Sponsors
- Air Force Reserve (2015–2016, 2018); Cricket Wireless (2020–present)

2025 matchup
- South Carolina State vs. Prairie View A&M (South Carolina State 40–38^{4OT})

The Celebration Bowl is a postseason college football bowl game, first played in the 2015 season, contested between the champions of the Mid-Eastern Athletic Conference (MEAC) and the Southwestern Athletic Conference (SWAC)—the two prominent conferences of historically black colleges and universities (HBCUs) in NCAA Division I. It serves as the de facto national championship of black college football. (Note: Not all HBCUs in FCS are members of MEAC and SWAC—see discussion at Black college football national championship#Celebration Bowl.) The game is held annually in Atlanta on the third weekend of December, and has been played at the Georgia Dome and Mercedes-Benz Stadium. It is currently the only active bowl game to feature teams from the Football Championship Subdivision (FCS).

== History ==
The Celebration Bowl is a successor to two previous bowl games between the MEAC and SWAC, the Pelican Bowl and Heritage Bowl. Because the Celebration Bowl takes place during the FCS playoff tournament, neither the SWAC nor the MEAC can send their champion to the tournament. At the time the Celebration Bowl was inaugurated, the SWAC's regular season already extended too late into the year for its champion to enter the FCS playoffs, while the MEAC dropped its automatic bid to the FCS playoffs in order to send its champion to the Celebration Bowl.

The game is organized by ESPN Events, which also runs the MEAC/SWAC Challenge, the annual interconference game between the two conferences held over Labor Day weekend. The Celebration Bowl was sponsored by the Air Force Reserve for three playings: 2015, 2016, and 2018. On December 9, 2020, Cricket Wireless signed on as title sponsor of the game, formally making it the Cricket Celebration Bowl.

In June 2017, the SWAC announced that it would discontinue the SWAC Championship Game following the 2017 playing, resulting in the SWAC regular season champion automatically qualifying for the Celebration Bowl. However, in June 2018, the SWAC reversed course and continues to hold its championship game, with the winner advancing to the Celebration Bowl.

In 2020, the Celebration Bowl was not played, after the MEAC canceled all fall athletics due to the COVID-19 pandemic and the SWAC postponed its football season into the spring of 2021.

== Game results ==
Date	MEAC team		SWAC team		Venue	Attendance	Series	Notes
December 19, 2015	North Carolina A&T	41	Alcorn State	34	Georgia Dome	35,528	MEAC, 1–0	notes
December 17, 2016	North Carolina Central	9	Grambling State	10	Georgia Dome	31,096	tied, 1–1	notes
December 16, 2017	North Carolina A&T	21	Grambling State	14	Mercedes-Benz Stadium	25,873	MEAC, 2–1	notes
December 15, 2018	North Carolina A&T	24	Alcorn State	22	Mercedes-Benz Stadium	31,672	MEAC, 3–1	notes
December 21, 2019	North Carolina A&T	64	Alcorn State	44	Mercedes-Benz Stadium	32,968	MEAC, 4–1	notes
2020	Canceled due to the COVID-19 pandemic				Mercedes-Benz Stadium	—	MEAC, 4–1	—
December 18, 2021	South Carolina State	31	Jackson State	10	Mercedes-Benz Stadium	48,653	MEAC, 5–1	notes
December 17, 2022	North Carolina Central	41	Jackson State	34 (OT)	Mercedes-Benz Stadium	49,670	MEAC, 6–1	notes
December 16, 2023	Howard	26	Florida A&M	30	Mercedes-Benz Stadium	41,108	MEAC, 6–2	notes
December 14, 2024	South Carolina State	7	Jackson State	28	Mercedes-Benz Stadium	36,823	MEAC, 6–3	notes
December 13, 2025	South Carolina State	40	Prairie View A&M	38 (4OT)	Mercedes-Benz Stadium	26,703	MEAC, 7–3	notes

== MVPs ==
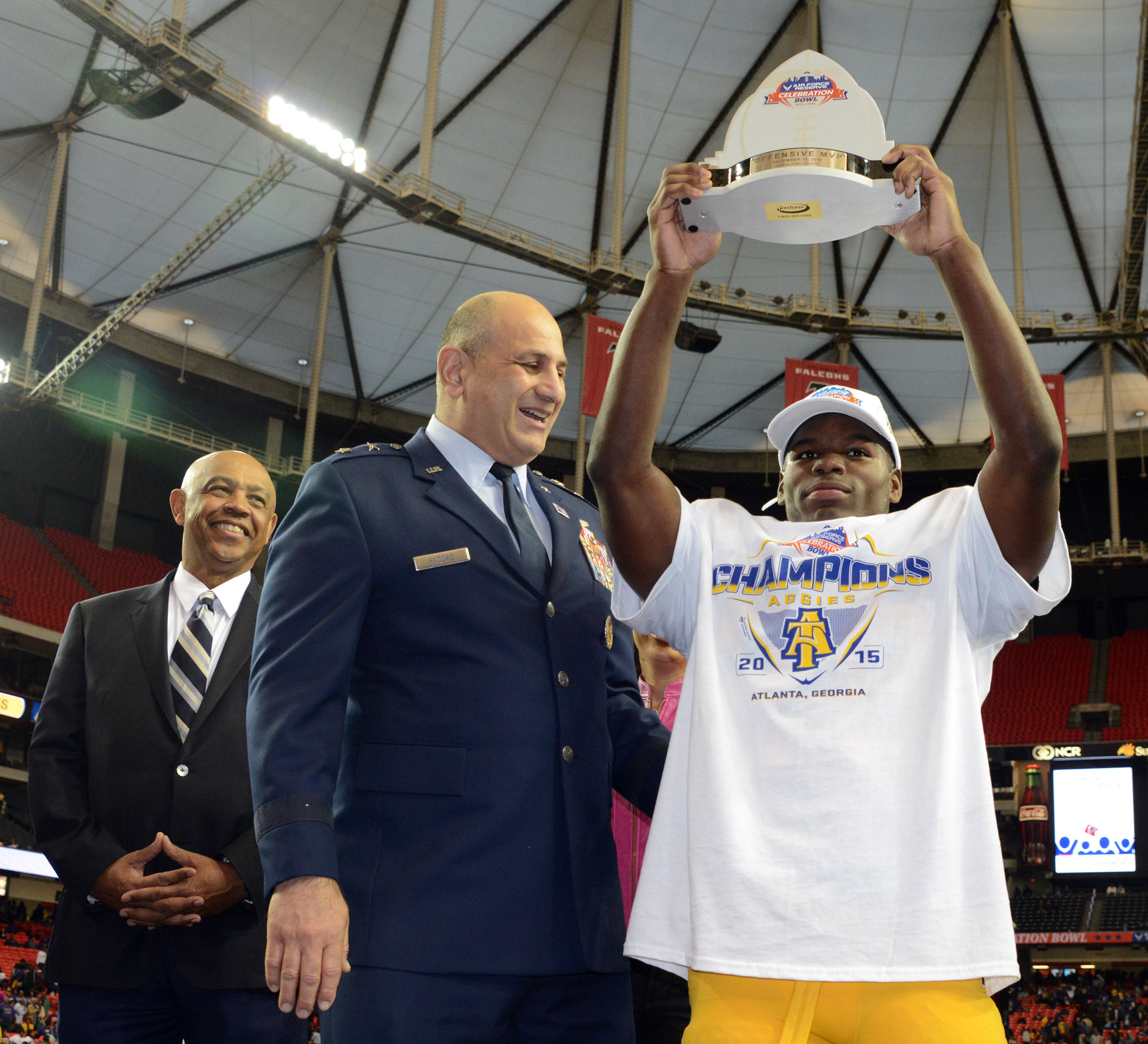
Tarik Cohen was the Offensive MVP of the 2015 game.

Two MVPs are selected for each game; one an offensive player, the other a defensive player.

Year	Offensive MVP			Defensive MVP		
Year	Player	Pos.	Team	Player	Pos.	Team
2015	Tarik Cohen	RB	North Carolina A&T	Denzel Jones	LB	North Carolina A&T
2016	Martez Carter	RB	Grambling State	Jameel Jackson	DB	Grambling State
2017	Marquell Cartwright	RB	North Carolina A&T	Franklin "Mac" McCain III	CB	North Carolina A&T
2018	Lamar Raynard	QB	North Carolina A&T	Richie Kittle	DB	North Carolina A&T
2019	Kylil Carter	QB	North Carolina A&T	Jacob Roberts	LB	North Carolina A&T
2021	Shaquan Davis	WR	South Carolina State	Cobie Durant	DB	South Carolina State
2022	Davius Richard	QB	North Carolina Central	Khalil Baker	DB	North Carolina Central
2023	Kelvin Dean	RB	Florida A&M	Isaiah Major	LB	Florida A&M
2024	Jacobian Morgan	QB	Jackson State	Jeremiah Williams	DL	Jackson State
2025	Ryan Subblefield	QB	South Carolina State	Brenyen Scott	DB	South Carolina State

== Most appearances ==
Updated through the December 2025 playing (10 games, 20 total appearances). Wins appear in bold font in the Years column.

Rank	Appearances	Team	Wins	Losses	Win pct.	Years
1	4	North Carolina A&T	4	0	1.000	**2015**, **2017**, **2018**, **2019**
2	3	South Carolina State	2	1	.667	**2021**, 2024, **2025**
2	3	Jackson State	1	2	.333	2021, 2022, **2024**
2	3	Alcorn State	0	3	.000	2015, 2018, 2019
3	2	Grambling State	1	1	.500	**2016**, 2017
3	2	North Carolina Central	1	1	.500	2016, **2022**
4	1	Florida A&M	1	0	1.000	**2023**
4	1	Howard	0	1	.000	2023
4	1	Prairie View A&M	0	1	.000	2025

== Game records ==
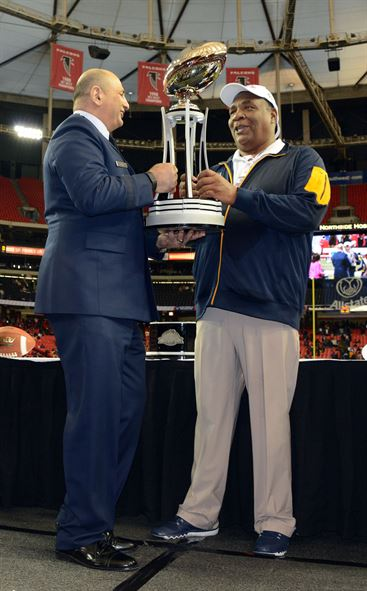
Head coach Rod Broadway (right) at the 2015 Celebration Bowl

Team	Record, Team vs. Opponent	Year
Most points scored (one team)	**64**, North Carolina A&T vs. Alcorn State	2019
Most points scored (losing team)	**44**, Alcorn State vs. North Carolina A&T	2019
Most points scored (both teams)	**108**, North Carolina A&T vs. Alcorn State	2019
Fewest points allowed	**7**, South Carolina State vs. Jackson State	2024
Largest margin of victory	**21**, shared by: South Carolina State vs. Jackson State; Jackson State vs. South Carolina State	2021; 2024
Total yards	**574**, North Carolina A&T vs. Alcorn State	2019
Rushing yards	**366**, North Carolina A&T vs. Alcorn State	2015
Passing yards	**364**, North Carolina A&T vs. Alcorn State	2019
First downs	**24**, shared by: Alcorn State vs. North Carolina A&T; Jackson State vs. North Carolina Central	2019; 2022
Fewest yards allowed	**178**, South Carolina State vs. Jackson State	2024
Fewest rushing yards allowed	**19**, Jackson State vs. South Carolina State	2021
Fewest passing yards allowed	**106**, Howard vs. Florida A&M	2023
Individual	Record, Player, Team vs. Opponent	Year
All-purpose yards	**348**, shared by: Tarik Cohen (North Carolina A&T); Shedeur Sanders (Jackson State)	2015; 2022
Touchdowns (all-purpose)	**5**, Shedeur Sanders (Jackson State)	2022
Rushing yards	**295**, Tarik Cohen (North Carolina A&T)	2015
Rushing touchdowns	**3**, Tarik Cohen (North Carolina A&T)	2015
Passing yards	**364**, Kylil Carter (North Carolina A&T)	2019
Passing touchdowns	**6**, Kylil Carter (North Carolina A&T)	2019
Receiving yards	**150**, Chris Blair (Alcorn State)	2019
Receptions	**10**, Elijah Bell (North Carolina A&T)	2017
Receiving touchdowns	**3**, Shaquan Davis (South Carolina State)	2021
Tackles	**17**, Aaron Smith (South Carolina State)	2024
Sacks	**2**, James Houston (Jackson State)	2021
Interceptions	**1**, shared by multiple players	
Long Plays	Record, Player, Team vs. Opponent	Year
Touchdown run	**83 yds.**, Tarik Cohen (North Carolina A&T)	2015
Touchdown pass	**85 yds.**, Shedeur Sanders to Kevin Coleman Jr. (Jackson State)	2022
Kickoff return	**79 yds.**, Malik Wilson (North Carolina A&T)	2018
Punt return	**84 yds.**, Anthony Williams, Jr. (Alcorn State)	2015
Interception return	**38 yds.**, Anthony Petty (Jackson State)	2024
Fumble return	**3 yds**, Taurence Wilson (Alcorn State)	2019
Punt	**74 yds.**, Dyson Roberts (South Carolina State)	2021
Field goal	**45 yds.**, Cody Jones (North Carolina A&T)	2015

== Broadcasting ==
Television and radio coverage of the bowl has included play-by-play announcers, color commentators, and sideline reporters.

=== Television ===
Date	Network	Play-by-play	Color commentary	Sideline reporter
2015	ABC	Mark Neely	Jay Walker	Tiffany Greene
2016	ABC	Mark Neely	Jay Walker	Tiffany Greene
2017	ABC	Mark Neely	Jay Walker	Tiffany Greene
2018	ABC	Mark Jones	Dusty Dvoracek & Jay Walker	Molly McGrath & Roddy Jones
2019	ABC	Mark Jones	Dusty Dvoracek & Jay Walker	Tiffany Greene & Roddy Jones
2021	ABC	Mark Jones	Robert Griffin III & Jay Walker	Quint Kessenich & Tiffany Greene
2022	ABC	Tiffany Greene	Jay Walker	Tiffany Blackmon
2023	ABC	Tiffany Greene	Jay Walker	Quint Kessenich
2024	ABC	Tiffany Greene	Jay Walker	Quint Kessenich
2025	ABC	Tiffany Greene	Jay Walker	Harry Lyles Jr. & Quint Kessenich

=== Radio ===
Date	Network	Play-by-play	Color commentary	Sideline reporter
2015	RedVoice, LLC	Sam Crenshaw	Hugh Douglas	
2016	RedVoice, LLC	Sam Crenshaw	Hugh Douglas	Lericia Harris
2017	Gameday Radio	Sam Crenshaw	Randy McMichael	Lericia Harris
2018	Gameday Radio	Andy Demetra	Randy McMichael	Lericia Harris
2019	Bowlday Radio	Travis Jones	Randy McMichael	Tenitra Batiste
2021	Bowl Season Radio	Travis Jones	D. J. Shockley	Tenitra Batiste
2022	ESPN Radio	Anish Shroff	Max Starks	Harry Lyles Jr.
2023	Bowl Season Radio	Travis Jones	Marshall Newhouse	Olivia Moody
2024	ESPN Radio	Jason Ross Jr.	Max Starks	Jordan Reid
2025	ESPN Radio	Jason Ross Jr.	Max Starks	Jordan Reid

== See also ==
- Pioneer Bowl and Florida Beach Bowl, similar bowl games for NCAA Division II HBCUs.
- List of college bowl games
- African Americans in Atlanta
- MEAC/SWAC Challenge
- HBCU Legacy Bowl
