= North Carolina A&T–South Carolina State football rivalry =

American college football rivalry game

- North Carolina A&T Aggies South Carolina State Bulldogs
- Sport: Football
- First meeting: 1924; NC A&T 52, SCSU 0
- Latest meeting: October 11, 2025; SCSU 22, NC A&T 16

Statistics
- Total meetings: 61
- All-time series: SCSU, 35–24–2
- Largest victory: SCSU, 52–0 (1977); NCAT, 66–14 (2000)
- Longest win streak: SCSU, 11 (2001–2011)
- Current win streak: SCSU, 2 (2024–present)

Locations of North Carolina A&T and South Carolina State

The North Carolina A&T–South Carolina State football rivalry is an American college football rivalry game played annually by the Aggies of North Carolina Agricultural and Technical State University and the Bulldogs of South Carolina State University. The series dates back to 1924 and is driven by the proximity of the two schools, as both are within The Carolinas; and conference alignments.

Both schools are members of the NCAA Division I Mid-Eastern Athletic Conference (MEAC) and are the largest public Historically Black colleges representing their respective states. In addition to each team's respective home fields in Greensboro, North Carolina and Orangeburg, South Carolina, the annual match up between the two Southeastern state schools has been held in cities such as Charlotte and Atlanta, as various classics. A pivotal moment in this rivalry was when South Carolina State spoiled the North Carolina A&T's 2003 undefeated conference record when they handed the Aggies their only MEAC loss of the season with a 49–9 win in the regular season closer. Currently, South Carolina State leads the series 34 to 24, with 2 ties.

== Series history ==
The North Carolina A&T and South Carolina State have been continuously competing against each other since 1958. In the most recent contest, North Carolina A&T defeated the Bulldogs by a score of 30–20 in Aggie Stadium (North Carolina A&T). The two schools have played 61 times since their first meeting, with South Carolina State leading the series with a record of 35 wins 24 losses and 2 ties.

In the early years of the series, the matchup between North Carolina A&T and South Carolina State was an inter-conference contest as A&T was a member of the NCAA Division II Central Intercollegiate Athletic Conference (CIAA) and SC State was a member of the Southern Intercollegiate Athletic Conference (SIAC). In 1969, A&T and SCSU; along with five other institutions, formed the MEAC. As a result of the newly formed conference, the series between the two schools now had conference implications. From 1952 to 1973, A&T dominated the series as the Aggies maintained a 7–0 winning streak. in 1974, under the leadership of head coach Willie E. Jeffries, South Carolina State would earn their first victory of the series. That season, the bulldogs would go on to claim the MEAC championship.

South Carolina State would maintain their dominance for the remainder of the 1970, winning 5 MEAC football titles in the decade. In 1976, A&T spoiled South Carolina State's chances at a perfect season. In their 1976 meeting, the Aggies handed the Bulldogs their lone defeat with a closely contested 15–14 victory in Greensboro, NC. Although suffering a loss to the rival Aggies, South Carolina State would go on to win the MEAC title and be crowned the Black College Football National Champions. From 1977 to 1985, the South Carolina State would go on a 9-game winning streak, bringing the series record to a tie in 1982.

In 1995, the annual competition moved from the two respective campuses to Charlotte, North Carolina, where it became known as the Carolinas Classic. During the classic's run, South Carolina State would win the first three contests, while the A&T would win the latter half. In 2002, the contest was moved to Atlanta's Georgia Dome and billed as the Peach State Classic. South Carolina State would win the game 26–9, increasing their command over the series to 21–13. The following year, the annual game would return to Charlotte. In 2003, South Carolina State spoiled the MEAC champion Aggies undefeated conference record when they handed A&T their only MEAC loss of the season with a 49–9 win in the regular season closer. Following the classics' run in Charlotte, the game was moved back to the team's respective home fields. In 2013, South Carolina State reached an agreement with the 100 Black Men of Atlanta to hold the annual meeting with A&T in Atlanta. The game marked the first time that two teams from the same conference would compete in the Atlanta Football Classic. In this meeting, South Carolina State would defeat the previously unbeaten North Carolina A&T Aggies 29–24. The following year, the game returned to Atlanta where the Bulldogs would once again defeat the Aggies 13–0. The 2015 matchup in Orangeburg, SC resulted in the Aggies defeating the Bulldogs by a score of 9–6.

== Game results ==
North Carolina A&T victories	South Carolina State victories	Tie games

No.	Date	Location	Winner	Score
1	1924	Unknown	North Carolina A&T	52–0
2	November 24, 1928	Orangeburg, SC	South Carolina State	32–27
3	October 11, 1958	Greensboro, NC	North Carolina A&T	16–14
4	October 10, 1959	Orangeburg, SC	North Carolina A&T	17–6
5	October 8, 1960	Greensboro, NC	North Carolina A&T	36–22
6	September 28, 1968	Greensboro, NC	North Carolina A&T	20–15
7	September 27, 1969	Orangeburg, SC	North Carolina A&T	20–6
8	September 19, 1970	Winston-Salem, NC	North Carolina A&T	24–23
9	September 18, 1971	Orangeburg, SC	Tie	0–0
10	September 16, 1972	Greensboro, NC	North Carolina A&T	41–7
11	September 15, 1973	Orangeburg, SC	Tie	14–14
12	September 21, 1974	Greensboro, NC	South Carolina State	8–0
13	September 20, 1975	Orangeburg, SC	South Carolina State	7–0
14	September 18, 1976	Greensboro, NC	North Carolina A&T	15–14
15	September 17, 1977	Orangeburg, SC	South Carolina State	52–0
16	September 16, 1978	Greensboro, NC	South Carolina State	34–7
17	September 15, 1979	Orangeburg, SC	South Carolina State	23–3
18	September 20, 1980	Flushing, NY	South Carolina State	24–9
19	September 19, 1981	Orangeburg, SC	South Carolina State	31–6
20	September 18, 1982	Orangeburg, SC	South Carolina State	31–6
21	September 17, 1983	Greensboro, NC	South Carolina State	27–6
22	September 15, 1984	Orangeburg, SC	South Carolina State	45–7
23	September 21, 1985	Greensboro, NC	South Carolina State	46–7
24	September 20, 1986	Orangeburg, SC	South Carolina State	51–14
25	September 19, 1987	Greensboro, NC	North Carolina A&T	34–11
26	September 17, 1988	Orangeburg, SC	South Carolina State	12–0
27	November 18, 1989	Greensboro, NC	North Carolina A&T	17–6
28	November 17, 1990	Orangeburg, SC	South Carolina State	35–32
29	November 23, 1991	Greensboro, NC	North Carolina A&T	49–21
30	November 21, 1992	Greensboro, NC	North Carolina A&T	24–21
31	November 20, 1993	Greensboro, NC	South Carolina State	58–52

No.	Date	Location	Winner	Score
32	November 19, 1994	Orangeburg, SC	South Carolina State	46–24
33	November 18, 1995	Charlotte, NC	South Carolina State	28–27
34	November 23, 1996	Charlotte, NC	South Carolina State	35–0
35	November 22, 1997	Charlotte, NC	South Carolina State	33–18
36	November 21, 1998	Charlotte, NC	North Carolina A&T	14–6
37	November 20, 1999	Charlotte, NC	North Carolina A&T	27–7
38	November 18, 2000	Charlotte, NC	North Carolina A&T	66–14
39	November 17, 2001	Orangeburg, SC	South Carolina State	15–14
40	November 23, 2002	Atlanta, GA	South Carolina State	26–9
41	November 22, 2003	Charlotte, NC	South Carolina State	49–9
42	November 20, 2004	Charlotte, NC	South Carolina State	34–28
43	November 19, 2005	Charlotte, NC	South Carolina State	43–27
44	November 18, 2006	Charlotte, NC	South Carolina State	41–19
45	November 17, 2007	Charleston, SC	South Carolina State	51–7
46	November 22, 2008	Greensboro, NC	South Carolina State	55–0
47	November 21, 2009	Orangeburg, SC	South Carolina State	20–10
48	November 20, 2010	Greensboro, NC	South Carolina State	48–3
49	November 12, 2011	Orangeburg, SC	South Carolina State	30–22
50	November 10, 2012	Greensboro, NC	North Carolina A&T	17–7
51	October 5, 2013	Atlanta, GA	South Carolina State	29–24
52	October 4, 2014	Atlanta, GA	South Carolina State	13–0
53	November 7, 2015	Orangeburg, SC	North Carolina A&T	9–6
54	November 5, 2016	Greensboro, NC	North Carolina A&T	30–20
55	September 30, 2017	Orangeburg, SC	North Carolina A&T	21–7
56	September 27, 2018	Greensboro, NC	North Carolina A&T	31–16
57	November 2, 2019	Orangeburg, SC	North Carolina A&T	22–20
58	November 13, 2021	Orangeburg, SC	North Carolina A&T	27–17
59	September 24, 2022	Greensboro, NC	North Carolina A&T	41–27
60	September 28, 2024	Orangeburg, SC	South Carolina State	45–25
61	October 11, 2025	Greensboro, NC	South Carolina State	22–16
Series: South Carolina State leads 35–24–2

== See also ==
- List of NCAA college football rivalry games
