= O'Kelly–Riddick Stadium =

Sports venue in Durham, North Carolina

Coordinates: 35.97386°N 78.89700°W

O'Kelly-Riddick Stadium
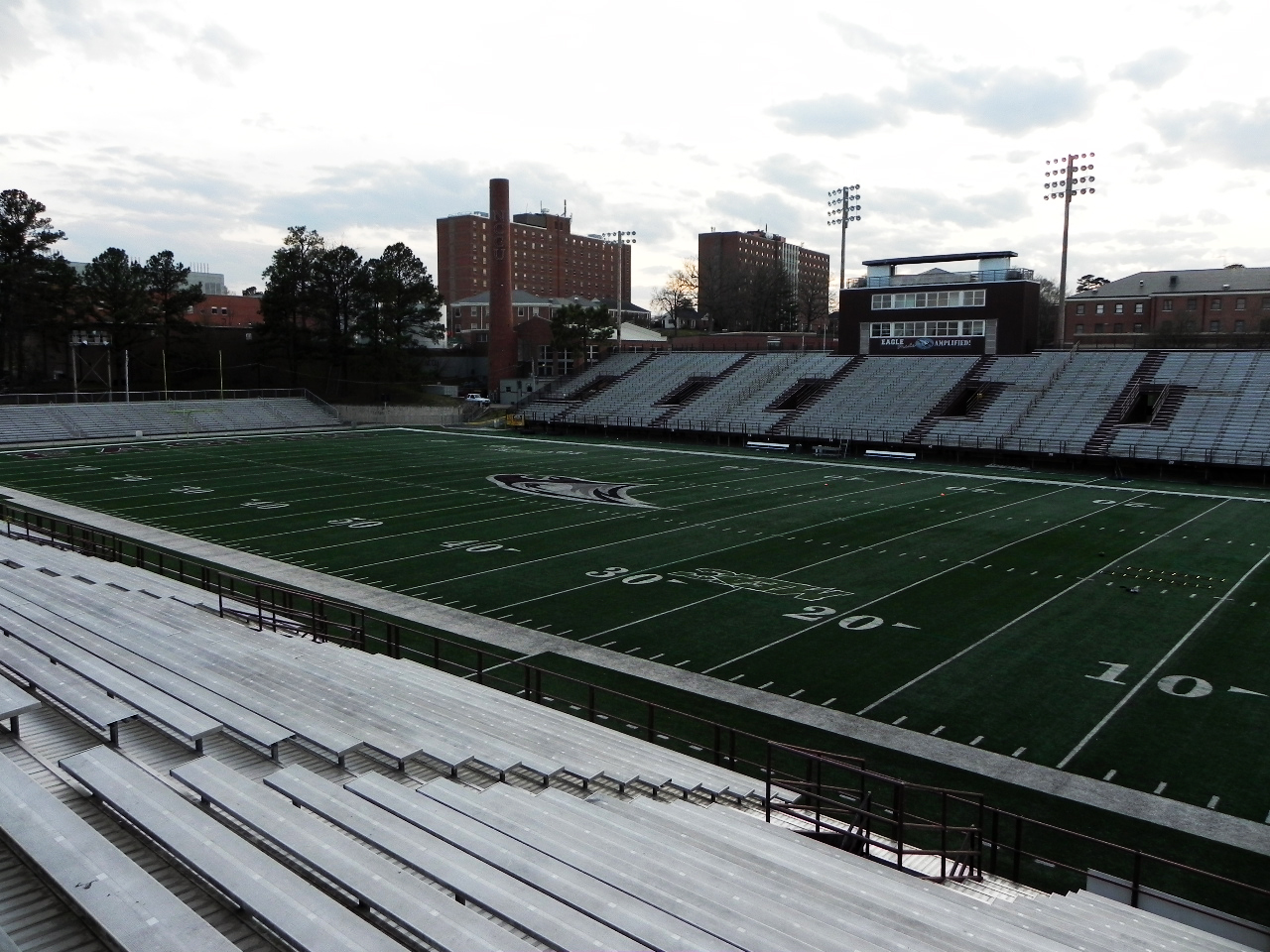
- Interactive map of O'Kelly-Riddick Stadium
- Location: 1801 Fayetteville Street; Durham, NC 27707
- Owner: North Carolina Central University
- Operator: North Carolina Central University
- Capacity: 10,000
- Surface: Field Turf

Construction
- Opened: 1975

Tenant
- North Carolina Central Eagles

O'Kelly–Riddick Stadium is a college football stadium in Durham, North Carolina. It is the home field of the North Carolina Central University Eagles. The stadium holds 10,000 people and opened in 1975.

== See also ==
- List of NCAA Division I FCS football stadiums
