= 2016 Mid-Eastern Athletic Conference football season =

2016 MEAC football season
- League: NCAA Division I Football Championship
- Sport: Football
- Number of teams: 12
- Conference champions: North Carolina A&T; Bethune-Cookman; North Carolina Central

MEAC football seasons
- ← 2015 2017 →

2016 Mid-Eastern Athletic Conference football standings
	Conf.			Overall
Team	W		L	W		L
No. 22 North Carolina Central $	8	–	0	9	–	3
No. 20 North Carolina A&T ^	7	–	1	9	–	3
Hampton	5	–	3	5	–	6
South Carolina State	5	–	3	5	–	6
Bethune–Cookman	4	–	4	4	–	6
Florida A&M *	4	–	4	4	–	7
Norfolk State	3	–	5	4	–	7
Savannah State *	3	–	5	3	–	7
Morgan State *	3	–	5	3	–	8
Howard *	2	–	6	2	–	9
Delaware State	0	–	8	0	–	11
$ – Conference champion; ^ – FCS playoff participant; * Florida A&M, Howard, Morgan State, and Savannah State ineligible for postseason due to APR violations; Rankings from STATS Poll

The 2016 Mid-Eastern Athletic Conference football season was the XXIst season for MEAC Football, as part of the 2016 NCAA Division I FCS football season.

== Previous season ==
21st ranked North Carolina A&T, along with #25 Bethune-Cookman and non-ranked North Carolina Central were named MEAC Co-Champions. Due to the MEAC's tiebreaker system, North Carolina A&T earned the conference's invitation to the inaugural Celebration Bowl. The Aggies defeated Southwestern Athletic Conference Champion, Alcorn State 41-34 and earning their fourth HBCU national championship.

== Head coaches ==
- Terry Sims, Bethune-Cookman – 2nd year
- Kenneth Carter, Delaware State– 2nd year
- Alex Wood, Florida A&M – 2nd year
- Connell Maynor, Hampton – 3rd year
- Gary Harrell, Howard – 5th year
- Frederick Farrier, Morgan State – 2nd year
- Latrell Scott, Norfolk State – 2nd year
- Rod Broadway, North Carolina A&T – 6th year
- Jerry Mack, North Carolina Central – 3rd year
- Erik Raeburn, Savannah State – 1st year
- Oliver Pough, South Carolina State – 15th year

== Rankings ==
Legend
Increase in ranking
Decrease in ranking
Not ranked previous week

		Pre	Wk 1	Wk 2	Wk 3	Wk 4	Wk 5	Wk 6	Wk 7	Wk 8	Wk 9	Wk 10	Wk 11	Wk 12	Final
Bethune-Cookman	Coaches	RV													
Bethune-Cookman	BOXTOROW	2													
Bethune-Cookman	SBN	3													
Delaware State	Coaches	NR													
Delaware State	BOXTOROW	NR													
Delaware State	SBN	NR													
Florida A&M	Coaches	NR													
Florida A&M	BOXTOROW	NR													
Florida A&M	SBN	NR													
Hampton	Coaches	NR													
Hampton	BOXTOROW	10													
Hampton	SBN	NR													
Howard	Coaches	NR													
Howard	BOXTOROW	NR													
Howard	SBN	NR													
Morgan State	Coaches	NR													
Morgan State	BOXTOROW	RV													
Morgan State	SBN	NR													
Norfolk State	Coaches	NR													
Norfolk State	BOXTOROW	RV													
Norfolk State	SBN	NR													
North Carolina A&T	Coaches	25													
North Carolina A&T	BOXTOROW	1													
North Carolina A&T	SBN	1 (29)													
North Carolina Central	Coaches	RV													
North Carolina Central	BOXTOROW	4													
North Carolina Central	SBN	6													
Savannah State	Coaches	NR													
Savannah State	BOXTOROW	NR													
Savannah State	SBN	NR													
South Carolina State	Coaches	RV													
South Carolina State	BOXTOROW	7													
South Carolina State	SBN	8													

Index to colors and formatting
MEAC member won
MEAC member lost
MEAC teams in **bold**

All times Eastern time.

Rankings reflect that of the STATS FCS poll for that week.

=== Week one ===
Date	Time	Visiting team	Home team	Site	TV	Result	Attendance	Reference
September 1	7:00 PM	**Delaware State**	Delaware	Delaware Stadium • Newark, DE (Route 1 Rivalry)		7-42	17,835	
September 3	12:00 PM	**Howard**	Maryland	Maryland Stadium • College Park, MD	BTN	13-52	35,474	
September 3	2:00 PM	**Morgan State**	Holy Cross	Hughes Stadium • Baltimore, MD		24-51	4,203	
September 3	6:00 PM	Elizabeth City	**Norfolk State**	William "Dick" Price Stadium • Norfolk, VA		12-20	11,780	
September 3	6:00 PM	St. Augustine's	**North Carolina A&T**	Aggie Stadium • Greensboro, NC	LTV	0-62	11,381	
September 3	6:00 PM	**Florida A&M**	Miami (FL)	Hard Rock Stadium • Miami Gardens, FL	ESPN3	3-70	60,700	
September 3	6:00 PM	**Savannah State**	Georgia Southern	Paulson Stadium • Statesboro, GA	ESPN3	0-54	21,250	
September 3	6:00 PM	**North Carolina Central**	Duke	Wallace Wade Stadium • Durham, NC		6-49	35,049	
September 3	6:00 PM	**Hampton**	Old Dominion	Foreman Field • Norfolk, VA		21-54	20,118	
September 3	6:00 PM	**South Carolina State**	UCF	Bright House Networks Stadium • Orlando, FL		0-38	36,260	
September 4	1:00 PM	Alcorn State	**Bethune-Cookman**	Municipal Stadium • Daytona Beach, FL (MEAC/SWAC Challenge)		No Contest (Note: The game between Alcorn State and Bethune-Cookman was canceled due to inclement weather. The game was delayed due to lightning in the second quarter with 7:13 remaining. Alcorn was leading 13–7. Both schools' athletic directors decided not to reschedule the game, thus declaring it a "no contest".)	-	

Players of the week:

Offensive		Defensive		Freshman		Special teams	
Tarik Cohen	North Carolina A&T	Jeremy Taylor	North Carolina A&T	Akevious Williams	Bethune-Cookman	Cody Jones	North Carolina A&T

=== Week two ===
Date	Time	Visiting team	Home team	Site	TV	Result	Attendance	Reference
September 10	12:00 PM	**Howard**	Rutgers	High Point Solutions Stadium • Piscataway, NJ	BTN	14-52	45,245	
September 10	7:00 PM	Monmouth	**Delaware State**	Alumni Stadium • Dover, DE		34-20	2,454	
September 10	2:00 PM	**Morgan State**	Holy Cross	Hughes Stadium • Baltimore, MD		24-51	4,203	
September 10	6:00 PM	**Savannah State**	Southern Miss	M. M. Roberts Stadium • Hattiesburg, MS		0-56	29,509	
September 3	6:00 PM	Elizabeth City	**Norfolk State**	William "Dick" Price Stadium • Norfolk, VA		12-20	11,780	
September 3	6:00 PM	St. Augustine's	**North Carolina A&T**	Aggie Stadium • Greensboro, NC	LTV	0-62	11,381	
September 3	6:00 PM	**Florida A&M**	Miami (FL)	Hard Rock Stadium • Miami Gardens, FL	ESPN3	3-70	60,700	
September 3	6:00 PM	**North Carolina Central**	Duke	Wallace Wade Stadium • Durham, NC		6-49	35,049	
September 3	6:00 PM	**Hampton**	Old Dominion	Foreman Field • Norfolk, VA		21-54	20,118	
September 3	6:00 PM	**South Carolina State**	UCF	Bright House Networks Stadium • Orlando, FL		0-38	36,260	
September 4	1:00 PM	Alcorn State	**Bethune-Cookman**	Municipal Stadium • Daytona Beach, FL (MEAC/SWAC Challenge)		No Contest--->	-	

Players of the week:

Offensive		Defensive		Freshman		Special teams	
Player	Team	Player	Team	Player	Team	Player	Team

=== Postseason ===
Since 1996, the MEAC earned an automatic bid into the Football Championship Subdivision playoffs. As of the 2015 season, the conference champion will abstain from participating in the playoffs and compete against the Southwestern Athletic Conference (SWAC) in the newly created Celebration Bowl. Any other team from the MEAC is able to participate in the playoff if they earn an at-large bid.

==== Bowl games ====
Date	Game	Site	Television	Teams	Affiliations	Results
Dec. 19	Celebration Bowl	Georgia Dome; Atlanta Georgia	ABC	North Carolina Central; Grambling State	MEAC; SWAC	9-10

==== FCS Playoffs ====
Date	Game	Site	Television	Teams	Affiliations	Results
Oct. 26	First Round	E. Claiborne Robins Stadium; Richmond, VA	ESPN3	North Carolina A&T; Richmond	MEAC; CAA	10-39

== Records against other conferences ==
=== MEAC vs. FCS conferences ===
Conference	Record
Big South	0–0
CAA	0–1
OVC	0–0
Patriot	0–1
SoCon	0–0
SWAC	0–0
Total	0–2

=== MEAC vs. FBS conferences ===
Conference	Record
ACC	0–0
American	0–1
Big Ten	0-1
Conference USA	0–0
MAC	0–0
MWC	0–0
Sun Belt	0–0
Total	0–2

== Attendance ==
Team	Stadium	Capacity	Game 1	Game 2	Game 3	Game 4	Game 5	Game 6	Total	Average	% of Capacity
Bethune-Cookman	Municipal Stadium	10,000									0%
Delaware State	Alumni Stadium	7,000									0%
Florida A&M	Bragg Memorial Stadium	25,500									0%
Hampton	Armstrong Stadium	17,000									0%
Howard	William H. Greene Stadium	10,000									0%
Morgan State	Hughes Stadium	10,000									0%
Norfolk State	William "Dick" Price Stadium	30,000	11,780								39%
North Carolina A&T	Aggie Stadium	21,500	11,381	14,467	13,005						60%
North Carolina Central	O'Kelly–Riddick Stadium	10,000									0%
Savannah State	Ted Wright Stadium	8,000									0%
South Carolina State	Oliver C. Dawson Stadium	22,000						—			0%
