= 2016 North Carolina Central Eagles football team =

American college football season

2016 North Carolina Central Eagles football

MEAC champion

Celebration Bowl, L 9–10 vs. Grambling State
- Conference: Mid-Eastern Athletic Conference

Ranking
- STATS: No. 22
- FCS Coaches: No. 20
- Record: 9–3 (8–0 MEAC)
- Head coach: Jerry Mack (3rd season)
- Offensive coordinator: T. C. Taylor (2nd season)
- Defensive coordinator: Granville Eastman (3rd season)
- Home stadium: O'Kelly–Riddick Stadium

2016 Mid-Eastern Athletic Conference football standings
	Conf.			Overall
Team	W		L	W		L
No. 22 North Carolina Central $	8	–	0	9	–	3
No. 20 North Carolina A&T ^	7	–	1	9	–	3
Hampton	5	–	3	5	–	6
South Carolina State	5	–	3	5	–	6
Bethune–Cookman	4	–	4	4	–	6
Florida A&M *	4	–	4	4	–	7
Norfolk State	3	–	5	4	–	7
Savannah State *	3	–	5	3	–	7
Morgan State *	3	–	5	3	–	8
Howard *	2	–	6	2	–	9
Delaware State	0	–	8	0	–	11
$ – Conference champion; ^ – FCS playoff participant; * Florida A&M, Howard, Morgan State, and Savannah State ineligible for postseason due to APR violations; Rankings from STATS Poll

The 2016 North Carolina Central Eagles football team represented North Carolina Central University as a member of the Mid-Eastern Athletic Conference (MEAC) during the 2016 NCAA Division I FCS football season. Led by third-year head coach Jerry Mack, the Eagles compiled an overall record of 9–3 with a mark of 8–0, winning the MEAC title. North Carolina Central earned a berth in the Celebration Bowl, where the Eagles lost to Grambling State. The team played home games at O'Kelly–Riddick Stadium in Durham, North Carolina.

== Schedule ==
Date	Time	Opponent	Rank	Site	TV	Result	Attendance
September 3	6:00 pm	at Duke*		Wallace Wade Stadium; Durham, NC (Bull City Gridiron Classic)	ESPN3	L 6–49	35,049
September 10	7:00 pm	at Western Michigan*		Waldo Stadium; Kalamazoo, MI	ESPN3	L 21–70	23,727
September 17	6:00 pm	Saint Augustine's*		O'Kelly–Riddick Stadium; Durham, NC	NSN	W 65–7	4,016
September 24	2:00 pm	at Norfolk State		William "Dick" Price Stadium; Norfolk, VA	SSC	W 34–31	8,296
October 1	4:00 pm	at Bethune–Cookman		Municipal Stadium; Daytona Beach, FL	CEN	W 31–14	4,216
October 8	4:00 pm	Florida A&M		O'Kelly–Riddick Stadium; Durham, NC	NSN	W 17–13	617
October 15	2:00 pm	Savannah State^{†}		O'Kelly–Riddick Stadium; Durham, NC	NSN	W 33–3	12,966
October 22	1:00 pm	at Morgan State		Hughes Stadium; Baltimore, MD		W 21–17	8,534
November 5	2:00 pm	at Delaware State		Alumni Stadium; Dover, DE	WDSU-TV	W 38–19	1,597
November 12	2:00 pm	Howard		O'Kelly–Riddick Stadium; Durham, NC	NSN	W 30–21	6,897
November 19	2:00 pm	No. 9 North Carolina A&T	No. 24	O'Kelly–Riddick Stadium; Durham, NC (rivalry)	ESPN3, ESPNU (tape delay)	W 42–21	15,715
December 17	3:00 pm	vs. No. 16 Grambling State*	No. 20	Georgia Dome; Atlanta, GA (Celebration Bowl)	ABC	L 9–10	31,096
*Non-conference game; ^{†}Homecoming; Rankings from STATS Poll released prior to the game; All times are in Eastern time

== Game summaries ==
=== At Duke ===
	1	2	3	4	Total
Eagles	0	0	3	3	6
Blue Devils	21	28	0	0	49

=== At Western Michigan ===
	1	2	3	4	Total
Eagles	7	14	0	0	21
Broncos	28	14	14	14	70

=== Saint Augustine's ===
	1	2	3	4	Total
Falcons	0	7	0	0	7
Eagles	21	20	7	17	65

=== At Norfolk State ===
	1	2	3	4	Total
Eagles	10	7	10	7	34
Spartans	0	10	0	21	31

=== At Bethune–Cookman ===
	1	2	3	4	Total
Eagles	0	7	10	14	31
Wildcats	7	0	0	7	14

=== Florida A&M ===
	1	2	3	4	Total
Rattlers	5	0	0	8	13
Eagles	0	3	0	14	17

=== Savannah State ===
	1	2	3	4	Total
Tigers	0	0	0	3	3
Eagles	3	16	7	7	33

=== At Morgan State ===
	1	2	3	4	Total
Eagles	14	0	0	7	21
Bears	7	10	0	0	17

=== At Delaware State ===
	1	2	3	4	Total
Eagles	9	22	7	0	38
Hornets	0	7	0	12	19

=== Howard ===
	1	2	3	4	Total
Bison	7	0	0	14	21
Eagles	6	3	7	14	30

=== North Carolina A&T ===
	1	2	3	4	Total
#9 Aggies	0	0	7	14	21
#24 Eagles	0	14	14	14	42

=== Celebration Bowl–Grambling State ===
	1	2	3	4	Total
#16 Tigers	0	0	10	0	10
#20 Eagles	3	0	0	6	9

== Ranking movements ==
Ranking movements Legend: ██ Increase in ranking ██ Decrease in ranking — = Not ranked RV = Received votes
	Week													
Poll	Pre	1	2	3	4	5	6	7	8	9	10	11	12	Final
STATS FCS	RV	—	—	—	RV	RV	RV	RV	RV	RV	RV	24	20	22
Coaches	RV	—	—	—	—	—	RV	RV	RV	RV	25	20	18	20
