= 2016 North Carolina A&T Aggies football team =

American college football season

2016 North Carolina A&T Aggies football

NCAA Division I First Round, L 10–39 at Richmond
- Conference: Mid-Eastern Athletic Conference

Ranking
- STATS: No. 17
- FCS Coaches: No. 17
- Record: 9–3 (7–1 MEAC)
- Head coach: Rod Broadway (6th season)
- Offensive coordinator: Chip Hester (2nd season)
- Defensive coordinator: Sam Washington (6th season)
- Home stadium: Aggie Stadium

2016 Mid-Eastern Athletic Conference football standings
| | Conf. | | | Overall |
| Team | W | | L | W | | L |
|---|---|---|---|---|---|---|
| No. 22 North Carolina Central $ | 8 | – | 0 | 9 | – | 3 |
| No. 20 North Carolina A&T ^ | 7 | – | 1 | 9 | – | 3 |
| Hampton | 5 | – | 3 | 5 | – | 6 |
| South Carolina State | 5 | – | 3 | 5 | – | 6 |
| Bethune–Cookman | 4 | – | 4 | 4 | – | 6 |
| Florida A&M * | 4 | – | 4 | 4 | – | 7 |
| Norfolk State | 3 | – | 5 | 4 | – | 7 |
| Savannah State * | 3 | – | 5 | 3 | – | 7 |
| Morgan State * | 3 | – | 5 | 3 | – | 8 |
| Howard * | 2 | – | 6 | 2 | – | 9 |
| Delaware State | 0 | – | 8 | 0 | – | 11 |
$ – Conference champion; ^ – FCS playoff participant; * Florida A&M, Howard, Morgan State, and Savannah State ineligible for postseason due to APR violations; Rankings from STATS Poll

The 2016 North Carolina A&T Aggies football team represented North Carolina A&T State University as a member of Mid-Eastern Athletic Conference (MEAC) during the 2016 NCAA Division I FCS football season. Led by sixth-year head coach Rod Broadway, the Aggies compiled an overall record of 9–3 with a mark of 7–1 in conference play, placing second in the MEAC. North Carolina A&T received an at-large bid to the NCAA Division I Football Championship playoffs, where the Aggies lost in the first round to Richmond. North Carolina A&T played home games at Aggie Stadium in Greensboro, North Carolina.

== Before the season ==
At the conclusion of the 2015 football season, the Aggies lost key players such as quarterback Kwashaun Quick, who was the only quarterback in the program's history to finish with more than 2,000 passing and 1,000 rushing yards. In addition to Quick, the Aggies also lost defensive back Tony McRae, defensive tackle Michael Neal and linebackers Denzel Jones & Landis Shoffner.

=== Recruiting ===
College recruiting (2016)
| Name | Hometown | School | Height | Weight | Commit date |
|---|---|---|---|---|---|
| Tyler Beck; LB | Glenwood, IL | Homewood Flossmoor HS | 6 ft 2 in (1.88 m) | 235 lb (107 kg) | Feb 3, 2016 |
| Tyler Beck; LB | Recruit ratings: No ratings found | | | | |
| Elijah Bell; WR | Wheeling, WV | Wheeling Park HS | 6 ft 2 in (1.88 m) | 210 lb (95 kg) | Feb 3, 2016 |
| Elijah Bell; WR | Recruit ratings: No ratings found | | | | |
| Daquan Blake; OL | Leavenworth, KS | Coffeyville CC | 6 ft 3 in (1.91 m) | 315 lb (143 kg) | |
| Daquan Blake; OL | Recruit ratings: No ratings found | | | | |
| Kentre’ Grier; QB | South Charleston, WV | South Charleston HS | 6 ft 2 in (1.88 m) | 175 lb (79 kg) | |
| Kentre’ Grier; QB | Recruit ratings: No ratings found | | | | |
| Ron Hunt; WR | Greensboro, NC | Southern Guilford | 6 ft 2 in (1.88 m) | 175 lb (79 kg) | Feb 3, 2016 |
| Ron Hunt; WR | Recruit ratings: No ratings found | | | | |
| Savion Johnson; RB | Wheeling, WV | Wheeling Park HS | 5 ft 11 in (1.80 m) | 225 lb (102 kg) | |
| Savion Johnson; RB | Recruit ratings: No ratings found | | | | |
| Randy Leak; WR | Laurinburg, NC | Scotland County HS | 6 ft 2 in (1.88 m) | 180 lb (82 kg) | Feb 3, 2016 |
| Randy Leak; WR | Recruit ratings: No ratings found | | | | |
| Franklin McCain III; DB | Greensboro, NC | Dudley HS | 6 ft 1 in (1.85 m) | 170 lb (77 kg) | Feb 3, 2016 |
| Franklin McCain III; DB | Recruit ratings: No ratings found | | | | |
| Justin Phillip; DB | Brooklyn, NY | Grand Street Campus HS | 6 ft 0 in (1.83 m) | 190 lb (86 kg) | Feb 3, 2016 |
| Justin Phillip; DB | Recruit ratings: No ratings found | | | | |
| Jarvis Reid | Albany, GA | Westover HS | 6 ft 3 in (1.91 m) | 230 lb (100 kg) | Feb 3, 2016 |
| Jarvis Reid | Recruit ratings: No ratings found | | | | |
| Leon "Tre" Smalls; LB | Hanahan, SC | Hanahan HS | 6 ft 1 in (1.85 m) | 217 lb (98 kg) | Feb 3, 2016 |
| Leon "Tre" Smalls; LB | Recruit ratings: No ratings found | | | | |
| DeMarcus Tinsley; OL | Newnan, GA | Hewman HS | 6 ft 4 in (1.93 m) | 295 lb (134 kg) | Feb 3, 2016 |
| DeMarcus Tinsley; OL | Recruit ratings: No ratings found | | | | |
| Ashton Tolliver; DB | Bronx, NY | Cardinal Hayes | 6 ft 0 in (1.83 m) | 175 lb (79 kg) | Feb 3, 2016 |
| Ashton Tolliver; DB | Recruit ratings: No ratings found | | | | |
| Shomari Wallace; DT | Hope Mills, NC | South View HS | 6 ft 3 in (1.91 m) | 220 lb (100 kg) | Feb 3, 2016 |
| Shomari Wallace; DT | Recruit ratings: No ratings found | | | | |
| Derrek Williams II | Winston-Salem, NC | North Forsyth HS | 5 ft 10 in (1.78 m) | 177 lb (80 kg) | Feb 3, 2016 |
| Derrek Williams II | Recruit ratings: No ratings found | | | | |
Overall recruit ranking:
Note: In many cases, Scout, Rivals, 247Sports, On3, and ESPN may conflict in their listings of height and weight.; In these cases, the average was taken. ESPN grades are on a 100-point scale.; Sources: "2016 Team Ranking". Rivals.com.

== Coaching staff ==
2016 North Carolina A&T Aggies coaching staff
| Head coach: Head coach – Rod Broadway; Offensive coaches: Offensive coordinator/wide receivers – Larry "Chip" Hester; Offensive line – Ronald Mattes; Quarterbacks - Chris Barnette; Running backs/recruiting coordinator - Shawn Gibbs; Tight end/offensive graduate assistant – Matt Pawlowski; Defensive coaches: Defensive coordinator/defensive backs – Sam Washington; Defensive line – Courtney Coard; Inside linebackers – Thomas Howard; Outside linebackers – Dino Kaklis; Defensive graduate assistant – Michael Neal | Administrative staff: Athletic Director (A.D.) - Earl M. Hilton III; Administrative Support Associate for Football - Jeraldine Bailey; Student assistant – Brian Jenkins |

== Schedule ==
| Date | Time | Opponent | Rank | Site | TV | Result | Attendance |
|---|---|---|---|---|---|---|---|
| September 3 | 6:00 pm | St. Augustine's* | No. 25 | Aggie Stadium; Greensboro, NC | LTV | W 62–0 | 11,381 |
| September 10 | 6:00 pm | at Kent State* | No. 23 | Dix Stadium; Kent, OH | ESPN3 | W 39–36 ^{4OT} | 13,540 |
| September 17 | 2:00 pm | at Tulsa* | No. 18 | Skelly Field at H. A. Chapman Stadium; Tulsa, OK | ESPN3 | L 21–58 | 16,111 |
| September 29 | 7:30 pm | Hampton | No. 22 | Aggie Stadium; Greensboro, NC | LTV, ESPNU | W 31–9 | 14,467 |
| October 6 | 7:30 pm | Norfolk State | No. 18 | Aggie Stadium; Greensboro, NC | LTV, ESPNU | W 35–0 | 13,005 |
| October 15 (Note: Game was reseheduled from October 13, 2016 due to damages sustained to Daytona Beach from Hurricane Matthew.) | 1:00 pm | at Bethune–Cookman | No. 15 | Municipal Stadium; Daytona Beach, FL | ESPN3, ESPNU (tape delay) | W 52–35 | 3,715 |
| October 22 | 1:00 pm | at Howard | No. 14 | William H. Greene Stadium; Washington, DC | WHBC | W 34–7 | 7,086 |
| October 29 | 1:00 pm | Florida A&M^{†} | No. 12 | Aggie Stadium; Greensboro, NC | LTV | W 42–17 | 22,150 |
| November 5 | 1:00 pm | South Carolina State | No. 11 | Aggie Stadium; Greensboro, NC (rivalry) | LTV | W 30–20 | 11,357 |
| November 12 | 2:00 pm | at Delaware State | No. 10 | Alumni Stadium; Dover, DE | DESU-TV | W 45–14 | 1,389 |
| November 19 | 2:00 pm | at No. 24 North Carolina Central | No. 9 | O'Kelly–Riddick Stadium; Durham, NC (rivalry) | ESPN3, ESPNU (tape delay) | L 21–42 | 15,715 |
| November 26 | 2:00 pm | at No. 12 Richmond* | No. 17 | E. Claiborne Robins Stadium; Richmond, VA (NCAA Division I First Round) | ESPN3 | L 10–39 | 3,281 |
*Non-conference game; ^{†}Homecoming; Rankings from STATS Poll released prior to the game; All times are in Eastern time

== Roster ==
2016 North Carolina A&T Aggies Roster (Source)
| Wide receivers: 1 Denzel Keyes – Senior; 2 Michael Weaver Jr. - Senior; 3 Xavier Griffin – (redshirt) Junior; 8 Khris Gardin – Junior; 17 Isaiah Hicklin – Sophomore; 19 Kevin Francis – (redshirt) Senior; 47 Courtney Edmonds – Junior; 80 Jordan McGrigg - (redshirt) Freshman; 81 Ron Hunt – Freshman; 83 Carlis Parker – Junior; 84 Elijah Bell – Freshman; 85 Terrence Peterson - (redshirt) Freshman; 86 Deshaun McFadden – Sophomore; 88 Malik Wilson – (redshirt) Sophomore; Offensive line: 61 Josh Mattocks – (redshirt) Spohomore; 62 Malik Johnson - Freshman; 63 Nicholas Dease – Senior; 66 Arlander Cherry – Freshman; 69 Calvin Trotty – Freshman; 70 Brandon Parker – (redshirt) Sophomore; 71 Chris Davis – Freshman; 72 Darriel Mack – (redshirt) Sophomore; 73 Marcus Pettiford - Freshman; 74 Sylvester Smith – Freshman; 75 Charles Jones – Junior; 76 Shawn Best – (redshirt) Freshman; 77 Charles "Wes" Cole – Junior; 78 Micah Shaw – Freshman; Tight ends: 19 Justin Smith – (redshirt) Junior; 79 Eric McNair - (redshirt) Freshman; 82 Jarvis Reed - Freshman; 87 Leroy Hill – (redshirt) Sophomore; Fullbacks: 36 Anthony McMinn II – (redshirt) Junior; 39 Corbin Martin – Junior; 46 William Hollingsworth – Freshman | Quarterbacks: 7 Lamar Raynard^{†} – (redshirt) Sophomore; 10 Kylil Carter - Sophomore; 15 Oluwafemi Bamiro - (redshirt) Senior; Running backs: 20 Daniel Robinson – (redshirt) Junior; 22 Marquell Cartwright - (redshirt) Sophomore; 23 Amos Williams – (redshirt) Sophomore; 26 Samuel Stidwell IV - Sophomore; 28 Tarik Cohen^{†} – Senior; 38 Demetrius Fairley – Senior; Fullbacks: 36 Anthony McMinn II - (redshirt) Senior; 39 Corbin Martin - Senior; 46 William Hollingsworth - Sophomore; Defensive line: 51 D'Anthony Ross – Senior; 92 Jermaine Williams – Freshman; 94 Justin Cates - Sophomore; 95 Julian McKnight – (redshirt) Sophomore; 97 Sean Davis – Freshman; 99 Marquis Ragland - (redshirt) Senior; Defensive ends: 40 Darryl Johnson - Sophomore; 50 Angelo Keyes - (redshirt) Senior; 90 Malik Hampton-Prioleau - Senior; 91 Kenneth Melton - (redshirt) Junior; 93 Turner Echols - (redshirt) Sophomore; 96 Sam Blue - (redshirt) Sophomore; 98 Kadarius Kendrick - (redshirt) Freshman; Rovers: 24 Lorenz Suttles - Senior; 25 Jamaal Darden - Junior; 30 David Pulliam - (redshirt) Senior | Linebackers: 4 Marcus Albert - (redshirt) Junior; 26 Vander "Tre" Purcell - Sophomore; 34 Deion Jones - (redshirt) Sophomore; 41 Leon "Tre" Smalls - Freshman; 44 Julius Reynolds - (redshirt) Sophomore; 45 Joshua Patrick – Junior; 48 Jeremy Taylor - Junior; 52 Kiaundric Richardson - Sophomore; 53 Gerald Caskey – (redshirt) Junior; 56 Tyler Beck – Freshman; 57 Markeiss Blue – (redshirt) Sophomore; 58 Adrian McPherson - (redshirt) Freshman; 59 Elijah Westbrook - Freshman; 68 Darryl Jackson - (redshirt) Sophomore; Defensive backs: 5 Tard McCoy – (redshirt) Junior; 9 Zerius Lockhart – (redshirt) Junior; 12 Jerome Beatty – (redshirt) Junior; 14 Timadre Abram – (redshirt) Sophomore; 18 Tyree Andrews - (redshirt) Senior; 21 Derrek Williams - Freshman; 27 Justin Philip - Freshman; 29 Franklin (Mac) McCain III - Freshman; 32 Marquis Willis – (redshirt) Sophomore; 33 Jalen Bethea – (redshirt) Freshman; 35 Deiontae Jones - Freshman; 37 Kashon Baker – Freshman; 42 Ashton Tolliver - Freshman; 43 Najee Reams - Freshman; Punters: 16 Garrett Nestor - Junior; 55 Dominic Frescura - (redshirt) Junior; 60 Isaac Parks – Freshman; Kickers: 13 Cody Jones^{†} – Senior; Long snappers: 67 Ernest (Petie) Bush III - Freshman |
† Starter at position * Injured; did not play in 2016.

== Game summaries ==
=== St. Augustine's ===
Week One: St. Augustine's vs. #25 North Carolina A&T – Game Summary

| Quarter | 1 | 2 | 3 | 4 | Total |
|---|---|---|---|---|---|
| Falcons | 0 | 0 | 0 | 0 | 0 |
| #25 Aggies | 20 | 21 | 14 | 7 | 62 |

at Aggie Stadium, Greensboro, North Carolina

- Date: September 3, 2016
- Game time: 6:00pm EDT
- Game attendance: 11,381
- Referee: Jason Soistman
- TV: LTV

Game information

First quarter

- NCAT - Tarik Cohen 6 yard run, 12:16 (NCAT 0—7)
- NCAT - Denzel Keyes 5 yard pass from Lamar Raynard, 06:00 (NCAT 0—14)
- NCAT - Kris Gardin 50 yard punt return, 02:33 (NCAT 0—21)

Second quarter

- NCAT - Tarik Cohen 22 yard run, 13:50 (NCAT 0—28)
- NCAT - Lamar Raynard 1 yard run, 05:54 (NCAT 0—34)
- NCAT - Denzel Keyes 11 yard pass from Lamar Raynard, 01:18 (NCAT 0—41)

Third quarter

- NCAT - Ron Hunt 47 yard pass from Kylil Carter, 14:40 (NCAT 0—48)
- NCAT - Marquell Cartwright 19 run, 00:30 (NCAT 0—55)

Fourth quarter

- NCAT - Deshaun McFadden 8 yard pass from Oluwafemi Bamiro, 13:38 (NCAT 0—62)

Top Passer

- Lamar Raynard (NCAT) – 19/23, 162 YDS 2 TD

Top Rusher

- Tarik Cohen (NCAT) – 8 CAR, 65 YDS 2 TD

Top Receiver

- Denzel Keyes (NCAT) – 5 REC, 64 YDS 2 TD

This game marked the 4th meeting between Division II Saint Augustine's and the Aggies. The two teams have not faced each other since 1935 when the Aggies defeated the Falcons 33–0. Going into the matchup, the Aggies held the all-time series at 2–0–1. The Aggies easily outmatched Saint Augustine's with performances such as quarterback Lamar Raynard's 17 completions and 2 touchdowns. Other top performances include running back Tarik Cohen's 2 touchdowns and 8 carries. Cohen now owns the school record for receiving and rushing touchdowns with a career number of 42.

=== Kent State ===
Week Two: #23 North Carolina A&T vs Kent State– Game Summary

| Quarter | 1 | 2 | 3 | 4 | OT | Total |
|---|---|---|---|---|---|---|
| #23 Aggies | 0 | 0 | 10 | 7 | 22 | 39 |
| Golden Flashes | 3 | 7 | 7 | 0 | 19 | 36 |

at Dix Stadium, Kent, OH

- Date: September 10, 2016
- Game time: 8:15 pm EDT
- Game weather: 70 °F (21 °C), Rain
- Game attendance: 13,540
- Referee: Amanda Sauer
- TV: ESPN3

Game information

First quarter

- KENT - Shane Hynes 20 yard field goal, 00:05 (KENT 0—3)

Second quarter

- KENT - Brice Fackler 27 yard pass from Mylik Mitchell, 05:04 (KENT 0—10)

Third quarter

- NCAT - Leroy Hill 6 yard pass from Kylil Carter, 11:52 (KENT 7—10)
- NCAT - Cody Jones 36 yard field goal, 06:21 (TIE 10—10)
- KENT - Brice Fackler 27 yard pass from Mylik Mitchell, 00:00 (KENT 10—17)

Fourth quarter

- NCAT - Tarik Cohen 2 yard run, 05:50 (TIE 17—17)

Overtime

- NCAT - Cody Jones 35 yard field goal, 00:00 (NCAT 20—17)
- KENT - Shane Hynes 40 yard field goal, 00:00 (TIE 20—20)
- KENT - Justin Rankin 10 yard run, 00:00 (KENT 20—27)
- NCAT - Oluwafemi Bamiro 1 yard run, 00:00 (TIE 27—27)
- NCAT - Leroy Hill 2 yard pass from Oluwafemi Bamiro, 00:00 (NCAT 33—27)
- KENT - Johnny Woods 15 yard pass from Mylik Mitchell, 00:00 (TIE 33—33)
- KENT - Shane Hynes 42 yard field goal, 00:00 (KENT 33—36)
- NCAT - Denzel Keyes 15 yard pass from Oluwafemi Bamiro, 00:00 (NCAT 39—36)

Top Passer

- Mylik Mitchell (KENT) – 17/32, 182 YDS 3 TD

Top Rusher

- Tarik Cohen (NCAT) – 24 CAR, 133 YDS 1 TD

Top Receiver

- Tarik Cohen (NCAT) – 9 REC, 125 YDS 0 TD

This game marked the first meeting between the Aggies and NCAA Division I FBS Kent State. Going into the game, A&T held an 0-3 all-time record against FBS opponents, while Kent State was 13-0 against FCS opponents over the last 15 years. The Aggies were able to upset the Golden Flashes with a 39-36 victory in 4 overtimes. Fifth-year senior quarterback Oluwafemi Bamiro threw the game-winning pass to Denzel Keyes securing the program's first ever victory over FBS competition.

=== Tulsa ===
Week Three: #18 North Carolina A&T vs Tulsa– Game Summary

| Quarter | 1 | 2 | 3 | 4 | Total |
|---|---|---|---|---|---|
| #18 Aggies | 0 | 0 | 7 | 14 | 21 |
| Golden Hurricanes | 24 | 24 | 10 | 0 | 58 |

at Chapman Stadium, Tulsa, Ok

- Date: September 17, 2016
- Game time: 2:00pm EDT
- Game weather: 81 °F (27 °C), Sunny
- Game attendance: 16,111
- Referee: Marcus Wood
- TV: ESPN3

Game information

First quarter

- TLS - Redford Jones 25 yard field goal, 09:53 (TLS 0—3)
- TLS - James Flanders 1 yard run, 09:01 (TLS 0—10)
- TLS - Kolton Shindelar 65 yard interception return, 02:35 (TLS 0—17)
- TLS - Keevan Lucas 51 yard pass from Dane Evans, 01:04 (TLS 0—24)

Second quarter

- TLS - Keevan Lucas 13 yard pass from Dane Evans, 11:14 (TLS 0—31)
- TLS - James Flanders 21 yard run, 6:56 (TLS 0—38)
- TLS - Keevan Lucas 52 yard pass from Dane Evans, 04:02 (TLS 0—45)
- TLS - Redford Jones 28 yard field goal, 00:59 (TLS 0—48)

Third quarter

- TLS - Redford Jones 33 yard field goal, 13:12 (TLS 0—51)
- TLS - Rob Riederer 9 yard pass from Ryan Rubley, 02:46 (TLS 0—58)
- NCAT - Malik Wilson 75 yard pass from Isaiah Hicklin, 01:19 (TLS 7—58)

Fourth quarter

- NCAT - Elijah Bell 32 yard pass from Lamar Raynard, 10:32 (TLS 14—58)
- NCAT - Lamar Raynard 10 yard run, 00:22 (TLS 21—58)

Top Passer

- Dane Evans (TLS) – 19/29, 282 YDS 3 TD

Top Rusher

- D'Angelo Brewer (TLS) – 14 CAR, 60 YDS 0 TD

Top Receiver

- Justin Hobbs (TLS) – 7 REC, 114 YDS 0 TD

This game marks the first meeting between the Aggies and NCAA Division I FBS Tulsa. The Golden Hurricanes were able to establish a commanding 48–0 lead by halftime. A&T's offense was held off by Tulsa's defense until late in the 3rd quarter, when the Aggies finally posted their first points of the game.

=== Hampton ===
Week Five: Hampton vs #22 North Carolina A&T– Game Summary

| Quarter | 1 | 2 | 3 | 4 | Total |
|---|---|---|---|---|---|
| Pirates | 0 | 3 | 0 | 6 | 9 |
| #22 Aggies | 7 | 3 | 7 | 14 | 31 |

at Aggie Stadium, Greensboro, NC

- Date: September 29, 2016
- Game time: 7:30pm EDT
- Game weather: 73 °F (23 °C), Cloudy
- Game attendance: 14,467
- Referee: Rober Frazier
- TV announcers (LTV, ESPNU): Jay Walker, Eric Clemons

Game information

First quarter

- NCAT - Denzel Keyes 3 yd pass from Lamar Raynard, 13:10 (NCAT 0—7)

Second quarter

- NCAT - Cody Jones 42 yard field goal, 07:38 (NCAT 0—10)
- HAMP - Adam Brown 26 yard field goal, 04:43 (NCAT 3—10)

Third quarter

- NCAT - Tarik Cohen 15 yard run, 04:01 (NCAT 3—17)

Fourth quarter

- NCAT - Tarik Cohen 30 yard run, 13:36 (NCAT 3—24)
- NCAT - Tarik Cohen 94 yard run, 02:35 (NCAT 3—31)
- HAMP - Shakim Alonzo 59 yard pass from Jayl Williamson (kick failed), 01:05 (NCAT 9—31)

Top Passer

- Lamar Raynard (NCAT) – 15/24, 143 YDS 1 TD

Top Rusher

- Tarik Cohen (NCAT) – 26 CAR, 256 YDS 3 TD

Top Receiver

- Rashawn Proctor (HAMP) – 12 REC, 188 YDS 0 TD

This game marked the 45th meeting between A&T and Hampton. Going into the game, Hampton held a 26–17–2 all-time record against A&T. In their last two meetings, the Aggies had beaten Hampton by a combined 76-45, including their 45-31 victory last season in Hampton. Both the Aggies and Pirates went into the game with extra time to prepare courtesy of a bye week Hampton also faced the additional challenge of playing an A&T team that is 24-5 at home since 2011.

Tarik Cohen put in a 256-yard performance, including 3 touchdowns in the second half to give the Aggies their victory. His performance in this game broke 2 A&T school records; Cohen surpassed Stoney Polite's (1984–87) 41 career rushing touchdown record and also James White's 25 year record for longest run from scrimmage (89 yards).

=== Norfolk State ===
Week Six: Norfolk State vs #18 North Carolina A&T– Game Summary

| Quarter | 1 | 2 | 3 | 4 | Total |
|---|---|---|---|---|---|
| Spartans | 0 | 0 | 0 | 0 | 0 |
| #18 Aggies | 0 | 14 | 7 | 14 | 35 |

at Aggie Stadium, Greensboro, NC

- Date: October 6, 2016
- Game time: 7:32pm EDT
- Game weather: 72 °F (22 °C), Cloudy
- Game attendance: 13,005
- Referee: Andre Lowe
- TV announcers (LTV,ESPNU): Jay Walker, Eric Clemons

Game information

First quarter

Second quarter

- NCAT - Lamar Raynard 4 yard run, 06:47 (NCAT 0—7)
- NCAT - Elijah Bell 8 yard pass from Lamar Raynard, 03:27 (NCAT 0—14)

Third quarter

- NCAT - Denzel Keyes 3 yard pass from Oluwafemi Bamiro, 04:37 (NCAT 0—21)

Fourth quarter

- NCAT - Tarik Cohen 62 yard run, 13:57 (NCAT 0—28)
- NCAT - Darryl Johnson 0 yard blocked punt return, 11:54 (NCAT 0—35)

Top Passer

- Gregg Hankerson (NSU) – 15/25, 111 YDS 0 TD

Top Rusher

- Tarik Cohen (NCAT) – 23 CAR, 200 YDS 1 TD

Top Receiver

- Gerard Johnson (NSU) – 5 REC, 54 YDS 0 TD

This game marked the 40th meeting between A&T and Norfolk State. Going into the game, The Aggies held a 29-11 all-time record against NSU. In their last meeting, the Aggies defeated the Spartans 27–3 in Norfolk.

=== Bethune-Cookman ===
Week Seven: #15 North Carolina A&T vs Bethune–Cookman– Game Summary

| Quarter | 1 | 2 | 3 | 4 | Total |
|---|---|---|---|---|---|
| #15 Aggies | 14 | 7 | 3 | 28 | 52 |
| Wildcats | 7 | 7 | 7 | 14 | 35 |

at Municipal Stadium, Daytona Beach, FL

- Date: October 15, 2016
- Game time: 1:00pm EDT
- Game attendance: 3,715
- TV announcers (ESPN3): Jay Walker, Eric Clemons

Game information

First quarter

- NCAT - Khris Gardin 55 yard pass from Lamar Raynard, 11:56 (NCAT 7—0)
- COOK - Ja-Quan Lumas 16 yard pass from Larry Brihm Jr., 09:29 (TIE 7—7)
- NCAT - Michael Weaver Jr. 8 yard pass from Lamar Raynard, 01:18 (NCAT 14—7)

Second quarter

- NCAT - Tarik Cohen 87 yard run, 14:40 (NCAT 21—7)
- COOK - Frank Brown 18 yard pass from Larry Brihm Jr., 08:54 (NCAT 21—14)

Third quarter

- NCAT - Cody Jones 22 yard field goal, 12:42 (NCAT 24—14)
- COOK - Frank Brown 15 yard pass from Larry Brihm Jr., 10:09 (NCAT 24—21)

Fourth quarter

- COOK - Frank Brown 67 yard pass from Larry Brihm Jr., 14:50 (COOK 24—28)
- NCAT - Tarik Cohen 11 yard run, 13:43 (NCAT 31—28)
- COOK - Tupac Isme 2 yard run, 12:11 (COOK 31—35)
- NCAT - Elijah Bell 37 yard pass from Lamar Raynard, 09:22 (NCAT 38—35)
- NCAT - Jeremy Taylor 24 yard interception return, 09:03 (NCAT 45—35)
- NCAT - Tarik Cohen 8 yard run, 02:11 (NCAT 52—35)

Top Passer

- Larry Brihm Jr. (COOK) – 23/42, 376 YDS 4 TD

Top Rusher

- Tarik Cohen (NCAT) – 25 CAR, 220 YDS 3 TD

Top Receiver

- Jawill Davis (COOK) – 9 REC, 143 YDS 0 TD

This game marked the 37th meeting between the A&T and Bethune–Cookman. Going into the game, Bethune–Cookman held a 22–15 all-time record against the Aggies. In their last meeting, the Aggies defeated the Wildcats 24–14 in front of a home crowd in Greensboro. The Aggies scored 21 unanswered points in the fourth quarter for a come-from-behind win over Bethune–Cookman. Tarik Cohen finished the game with 220 yards and three touchdowns, a performance that made him the first player in A&T history to rush for at least 200 yards in three straight games. This game also saw quarterback Lamar Raynard throw for a career-high 277 yards and 3 touchdowns.

=== Howard ===
Week Eight: #14 North Carolina A&T vs Howard– Game Summary

| Quarter | 1 | 2 | 3 | 4 | Total |
|---|---|---|---|---|---|
| #14 Aggies | 14 | 6 | 14 | 0 | 34 |
| Bison | 0 | 0 | 0 | 7 | 7 |

at William H. Greene Stadium, Washington, D.C.

- Date: October 22, 2016
- Game time: 1:00pm EDT
- Game weather: 56 °F (13 °C), Mostly sunny
- Game attendance: 7,084

Game information

First quarter

- NCAT - Tarik Cohen 16 yard run, 9:36 (NCAT 7—0)
- NCAT - Denzel Keyes 3 yard pass from Lamar Raynard, 7:25 (NCAT 14—0)

Second quarter

- NCAT - Cody Jones 34 yard field goal, 6:29 (NCAT 17—0)
- NCAT - Cody Jones 28 yard field goal, 6:29 (NCAT 20—0)

Third quarter

- NCAT - Tarik Cohen 45 yard pass from Lamar Raynard, 13:51 (NCAT 27—0)
- NCAT - Denzel Keyes 9 yard pass from Lamar Raynard, 7:34 (NCAT 34—0)

Fourth quarter

- HOW - Jason Collins 1 yard run, 3:03 (NCAT 34—7)

Top Passer

- Lamar Raynard (NCAT) – 13/18, 191 YDS 3 TD

Top Rusher

- Tarik Cohen (NCAT) – 20 CAR, 133 YDS 1 TD

Top Receiver

- Denzel Keyes (NCAT) – 3 REC, 25 YDS 2 TD

This game marked the 39th meeting between the A&T and Howard. Going into the game, A&T held a 27–20–2 all-time record against Howard. In their last meeting, the Aggies cruised to a 65–14 victory over the Bison in front of sold out Homecoming crowd at Aggie Stadium. The Aggies were able to cruise to a near shutout over Howard in Washington to play spoiler to the Bison's Homecoming. Quarterback Lamar Raynard threw 191 passing yards and 3 touchdowns; while Running back Tarik Cohen ran for 133 yards and 1 touchdown in the winning effort. Cohen's performance put him over 5,000 career rushing yards.

=== Florida A&M ===
Week Nine: Florida A&M vs #12 North Carolina A&T– Game Summary

| Quarter | 1 | 2 | 3 | 4 | Total |
|---|---|---|---|---|---|
| Rattlers | 0 | 10 | 0 | 7 | 17 |
| #12 Aggies | 7 | 14 | 14 | 7 | 42 |

at Aggie Stadium, Greensboro, NC

- Date: October 29, 2016
- Game time: 1:00pm EDT
- Game attendance: 22,150
- TV: LTV

Game information

First quarter

- NCAT - Tarik Cohen 7 yard run, 02:45 (NCAT 0—7)

Second quarter

- FAMU - Devin Bowers 2 yard run, 14:56 (TIE 7—7)
- FAMU - Colby Blanton 20 yard field goal, 09:21 (FAMU 10—7)
- NCAT - Tarik Cohen 19 yard run (Cody Jones kick), 03:56 (NCAT 10—14)
- NCAT - Elijah Bell 25 yard pass from Lamar Raynard (Cody Jones kick), 01:12 (NCAT 10—21)

Third quarter

- NCAT - Marquell Cartwright 1 yard run (Cody Jones kick), 05:25 (NCAT 10—28)
- NCAT - Tarik Cohen 83 yard run (Cody Jones kick), 01:44 (NCAT 10—35)

Fourth quarter

- NCAT - Demetrius Fairley 20 yard run (Cody Jones kick), 10:55 (NCAT 10—42)
- FAMU - Marcus Williams 15 yard pass from Ryan Stanley (Colby Blanton kick), 06:30 (NCAT 17—42)

Top Passer

- Lamar Raynard (NCAT) – 20/27, 230 YDS 1 TD 1 INT

Top Rusher

- Tarik Cohen (NCAT) – 17 CAR, 145 YDS 3 TD

Top Receiver

- Montavius Williams (FAMU) – 8 REC, 98 YDS 0 TD

This game will mark the 64th meeting between the A&T and Florida A&M. Going into the game, Florida A&M holds a 44-17-3 all-time record against the Aggies. In their last meeting, the Aggies defeated the Rattlers 28-10 in Tallahassee.

=== South Carolina State ===
Week Ten: South Carolina State vs #11 North Carolina A&T– Game Summary

| Quarter | 1 | 2 | 3 | 4 | Total |
|---|---|---|---|---|---|
| Bulldogs | 6 | 7 | 7 | 0 | 20 |
| #11 Aggies | 10 | 6 | 0 | 14 | 30 |

at Aggie Stadium, Greensboro, NC

- Date: November 5, 2016
- Game time: 1:00pm EDT
- Game attendance: 11,357
- TV: LTV

Game information

First quarter

- NCAT - Tarik Cohen 15 yard run, 13:20 (NCAT 0—7)
- NCAT - Cody Jones 21 yard field goal, 3:33 (NCAT 0—10)
- SCSU - Adrian Kollock Jr. 17 yard run (Tyler Scandrett PAT missed), 0:00 (NCAT 6—10)

Second quarter

- NCAT - Elijah Bell 25 yard pass from Lamar Raynard (Cody Jones PAT missed), 11:58 (NCAT 6—16)
- SCSU - De'Montrez Burroughs 41 yard pass from Caleb York, 0:02 (NCAT 13—16)

Third quarter

- NCAT - Caleb York 1 yard run, 1:56 (SCSU 20—16)

Fourth quarter

- NCAT - Elijah Bell 9 yard pass from Lamar Raynard, 5:25 (NCAT 20—23)
- NCAT - Marquis Willis 29 yard interception return, 2:32 (NCAT 20—30)

Top Passer

- Lamar Raynard (NCAT) – 18/30, 169 YDS 2 TD

Top Rusher

- Adrian Kollock Jr. (SCSU) – 8 CAR, 80 YDS 1 TD

Top Receiver

- De'Montez Burroughs (SCSU) – 7 REC, 86 YDS 1 TD

This game will mark the 54rd meeting between the A&T and rival South Carolina State. Going into the game, South Carolina State holds a 32-19-2 all-time record against the Aggies. In their last meeting, the Aggies defeated the Bulldogs 9-6 in Orangeburg, SC.

=== Delaware State ===
Week Eleven: #10 North Carolina A&T vs Delaware State– Game Summary

| Quarter | 1 | 2 | 3 | 4 | Total |
|---|---|---|---|---|---|
| #10 Aggies | 7 | 14 | 14 | 10 | 45 |
| Hornets | 7 | 0 | 7 | 0 | 14 |

at Alumni Stadium, Dover, DE

- Date: November 5, 2016
- Game time: 2:00pm EDT
- Game attendance: 1,389
- TV: LTV

Game information

First quarter
Second quarter
Third quarter
Fourth quarter

Top Passer
Top Rusher
Top Receiver

This game marks the 45th meeting between the North Carolina A&T and Delaware State. Going into the game, both teams are tied at 22-22-1 in the all-time record against one another, with Delaware state holding the lead over A&T. In their last meeting, the Aggies tied the series when they defeated the Hornets 27-6 in Greensboro.

=== North Carolina Central ===
Week Twelve: #9 North Carolina A&T vs #24 North Carolina Central– Game Summary

| Quarter | 1 | 2 | 3 | 4 | Total |
|---|---|---|---|---|---|
| #9 Aggies | 0 | 0 | 7 | 14 | 21 |
| #24 Eagles | 0 | 14 | 14 | 14 | 42 |

at O'Kelly–Riddick Stadium, Durham, NC

- Date: October 19, 2016
- Game time: 2:00pm EDT
- Game weather: 70 °F (21 °C), Sunny
- Game attendance: 15,715
- Referee: Andre Lowe
- TV announcers (ESPN3): Jay Walker, Eric Clemons

Game information

First quarter

Second quarter

- NCCU - Dorrel McClain 15 yard run (Brandon McLaren Kick), 13:09 (NCCU 0-7)
- NCCU - Malcolm Bell 41 yard run (Brandon McLaren Kick), 01:31 (NCCU 0-14)

Third quarter

- NCCU - Kahlil Stinson 24 yard pass from Malcom Bell (Brandon McLaren Kick), 13:08 (NCCU 0-21)
- NCAT - Elijah Bell 86 yard pass from Oluwafemi Bamiro (Cody Jones Kick), 11:14 (NCCU 7—21)
- NCCU - Malcolm Bell 25 yard run (Brandon McLaren Kick), 05:51 (NCCU 7-28)

Fourth quarter

- NCCU - Dorrel McClain 1 yard run (Brandon McLaren Kick), 13:55 (NCCU 0-35)
- NCAT - Denzel Keyes 15 yard pass from Isaiah Hicklin (Cody Jones Kick), 09:07 (NCCU 14-35)
- NCCU - Dorrel McClain 76 yard run (Brandon McLaren Kick), 08:48 (NCCU 14-42)
- NCAT - Tarik Cohen 2 yard run (Cody Jones Kick), 00:04 (NCCU 21-42)

Top Passer

- Malcolm Bell (NCCU) – 10/18, 131 YDS 2 TD

Top Rusher

- Malcolm Bell (NCCU) – 16 CAR, 181 YDS 1 TD-->

Top Receiver

Lavontis Smith (NCCU) – 4 REC, 83 YDS 0 TD

This game marks the 88th meeting between North Carolina A&T and arch rival North Carolina Central. Going into the game, the Aggies hold a 49–33–5 all-time record against the Eagles. In their last meeting, the Eagles upset the favored Aggies 21-16 in A&T's sole conference loss of the season. The Eagle victory took away sole possession of the MEAC championship from A&T, resulting in a 3-way tie for first place. The MEAC tiebreaker formula would then eliminate the Eagles and name A&T the conference's representative for the inaugural Celebration Bowl against Southwestern Athletic Conference champion Alcorn State.

== FCS Playoffs ==
=== First Round–Richmond ===
FCS Playoffs First Round: #17 North Carolina A&T vs #12 Richmond– Game Summary

| Quarter | 1 | 2 | 3 | 4 | Total |
|---|---|---|---|---|---|
| #17 Aggies | 7 | 0 | 3 | 0 | 10 |
| #12 Spiders | 14 | 9 | 9 | 7 | 39 |

at E. Claiborne Robins Stadium, Richmond, VA

- Date: October 26, 2016
- Game time: 2:00pm EDT
- Game attendance: 3,281
- TV: ESPN3

Game information

First quarter

- NCAT - Denzel Keyes 12 yard pass from Oluwafemi Bamiro (Cody Jones kick), (NCAT 7-0)
- RICH - Deontez Thompson 2 yard run (Griffin Trau kick), (TIE 7-7)
- RICH - Dejon Brissett 92 yard punt return (Griffin Trau kick), (RICH 7-14)

Second quarter

- RICH - Griffin Trau 39 yard field goal, (RICH 7-17)
- RICH - Griffin Trau 33 yard field goal, (RICH 7-20)
- RICH - Griffin Trau 34 yard field goal, (RICH 7-23)

Third quarter

- NCAT - Cody Jones 28 yard field goal, (RICH 10-23)
- RICH - Griffin Trau 28 yard field goal, (RICH 10-26)
- RICH - Brian Brown 32 yard pass from Kevin Johnson (failed 2pt pass), (RICH 10-32)

Fourth quarter

- RICH - Kevin Johnson 7 yard run (Griffin Trau kick), (RICH 10-39)

Top Passer
Top Rusher
Top Receiver

This game marked the 1st meeting between North Carolina A&T and the University of Richmond. This was the program's fifth appearance in the FCS playoffs and their first at-large berth. A&T earned the playoff berth with combination of their #9 national ranking, their victory over FBS Kent State and their performance against Tulsa. The Aggies' last appearance in the FCS Playoffs was in 2003, losing in the first round to Wofford.

In the lead up to the match up, both the Aggies and Spiders were dealing with depth issues. Both teams suffered losses of their starting quarterbacks, with A&T losing Sophomore Lamar Raynard and Richmond losing Junior Kyle Lauletta. The Aggies started 3rd string Quarterback Oluwafemi Bamiro, while the Spiders tapped sophomore Kevin Johnson to make his season debut.

Johnson threw for 315 yards, including a 35-yard pass and 7-yard scoring run. The spiders were also able to neutralize running back Tarik Cohen, limiting him to only 70 yards from scrimmage and forcing Cohen's first fumble in 528 straight touches without one. Richmond also held the A&T to 226 offensive yards while gaining four turnovers.

== Post Season ==
As the 2016 college football season neared the end, many organizations began to announce finalists and winners of various past-season awards. Aggie players and coaches appeared on many of these lists. Several players for the Aggies were honored with awards and accolades including Wide Receiver Elijah Bell; Left Tackle Brandon Parker & Running Back Tarik Cohen.

Senior Tarik Cohen was awarded the Offensive Player of the year award for the third consecutive year, making him the first player in MEAC history to do so. Cohen also became the conference's all-time leading rusher, as his record-setting 1,588 rushing yards during the season extended his career total to 5,619. Cohen's performance placed him on the watch lists for both the Deacon Jones Trophy, which he was awarded, and the Walter Payton Award, where he ultimately finished fifth in the voting. In addition to setting new School and Conference rushing yardage records, Cohen broke the single-season touchdown record with 19 total. He also tied the school for the single-season rushing touchdowns record with 18; holds numerous school records including: rushing touchdowns, total touchdowns and total points at 56, 59 & 339 respectively. Cohen also earned several All-American recognition from a number of organizations and media outlets including: the NCAA, STATS FCS and BoxToRow. He was also named to the 2016 Walter Camp Football Championship Subdivision All-American team and he was named a second-team AFCA Football Championship Subdivision Coaches' All-American selection.

In addition to Cohen, Junior Brandon Parker & Freshman Elijah Bell also earned recognition. Parker was named offensive lineman of the year for the second straight season. Parker also earned conference player of the week honors on five separate occasions. Freshman Elijah Bell was also named conference rookie of the year. In his debut season, Bell set a freshman school record with 8 touchdown passes; and placed near the top of the MEAC in both yards per reception and receiving yardage.

The following A&T players were also named to the All–MEAC First, Second, and Third Teams:

All-MEAC First Team
- Tarik Cohen, Sr., RB
- Leroy Hill, R-So., TE
- Brandon Parker, R-Jr., OL
- Wes Cole, R-Jr., OL
- Marquis Ragland, R-Sr., DL
- Angelo Keyes, R-Sr., DL
- Jeremy Taylor, Jr., LB

All-MEAC Second Team
- Lamar Raynard, R-So., QB
- Elijah Bell, Fr., WR
- Denzel Keyes, Sr., WR
- Darriel Mack, R-Jr., C
- Khris Gardin, Jr., RS

All-MEAC Third Team
- Dequan Blake, Jr. OL
- Cody Jones, Sr. PK

The Aggies finished the 2016 season ranked 20th nationally both the Coaches & Media polls. This marks the 10 time in the program's history, and also the 3rd time this was accomplished in back to back seasons. The team's win over Kent State was the program's first-ever win over a Division I Football Bowl Subdivision school.

=== 2017 NFL draft ===
The 2017 NFL draft was held on April 27–29, 2017 in front of the Philadelphia Museum of Art in Philadelphia, Pennsylvania. The following A&T players were either selected or signed as undrafted free agents following the draft.

| Player | Position | Round | Overall pick | NFL team |
|---|---|---|---|---|
| Tarik Cohen | RB | 4th | 119 | Chicago Bears |

== Ranking movements ==
Ranking movements Legend: ██ Increase in ranking ██ Decrease in ranking
| | Week | | | | | | | | | | | | | |
| Poll | Pre | 1 | 2 | 3 | 4 | 5 | 6 | 7 | 8 | 9 | 10 | 11 | 12 | Final |
|---|---|---|---|---|---|---|---|---|---|---|---|---|---|---|
| STATS FCS | 25 | 23 | 18 | 21 | 22 | 18 | 15 | 14 | 12 | 11 | 10 | 9 | 17 | 20 |
| Coaches | 25 | 24 | 19 | 22 | 23 | 18 | 16 | 14 | 11 | 10 | 9 | 9 | 17 | 20 |
| Sheridan Broadcasting Network (SBN) | 1 | 1 | 1 | 1 | 1 | 1 | 1 | 1 | 1 | 1 | 1 | 1 | 3 | |
| BoxToRow Media Poll and Coaches Poll (BTR) | 1 | 1 | 1 | 1 | 1 | 1 | 1 | 1 | 1 | 1 | 1 | | | |
| Heritage Sports Radio Network (HSRN) | 1 | 1 | 1 | 1 | 1 | 1 | 1 | 1 | 1 | 1 | 1 | | | |
