= 2016 Delaware State Hornets football team =

American college football season

2016 Delaware State Hornets football
- Conference: Mid-Eastern Athletic Conference
- Record: 0–11 (0–8 MEAC)
- Head coach: Kenny Carter (2nd season)
- Offensive coordinator: John Allen (2nd season)
- Defensive coordinator: Gerard Wilcher (1st season)
- Home stadium: Alumni Stadium

2016 Mid-Eastern Athletic Conference football standings
	Conf.			Overall
Team	W		L	W		L
No. 22 North Carolina Central $	8	–	0	9	–	3
No. 20 North Carolina A&T ^	7	–	1	9	–	3
Hampton	5	–	3	5	–	6
South Carolina State	5	–	3	5	–	6
Bethune–Cookman	4	–	4	4	–	6
Florida A&M *	4	–	4	4	–	7
Norfolk State	3	–	5	4	–	7
Savannah State *	3	–	5	3	–	7
Morgan State *	3	–	5	3	–	8
Howard *	2	–	6	2	–	9
Delaware State	0	–	8	0	–	11
$ – Conference champion; ^ – FCS playoff participant; * Florida A&M, Howard, Morgan State, and Savannah State ineligible for postseason due to APR violations; Rankings from STATS Poll

The 2016 Delaware State Hornets football team represented Delaware State University as a member of the Mid-Eastern Athletic Conference (MEAC) in the 2016 NCAA Division I FCS football season. Led by second-year head coach Kenny Carter, the Hornets compiled an overall record of 0–11 with a mark of 0–8 in conference play, placing last out of 11 teams in the MEAC. Delaware State played home games at Alumni Stadium in Dover, Delaware.

== Schedule ==
Date	Time	Opponent	Site	TV	Result	Attendance
September 1	7:00 pm	at Delaware*	Delaware Stadium; Newark, DE (Route 1 Rivalry)	BHAA	L 14–56	17,835
September 10	5:00 pm	Monmouth*	Alumni Stadium; Dover, DE	ESPN3	L 20–34	2,454
September 24	4:00 pm	at Missouri*	Faurot Field; Columbia, MO	SECN	L 0–79	53,472
October 1	1:00 pm	at Morgan State	Hughes Stadium; Baltimore, MD		L 17–20	1,386
October 8	2:00 pm	Hampton	Alumni Stadium; Dover, DE	DESU-TV	L 17–27	1,309
October 15	2:00 pm	Florida A&M^{†}	Alumni Stadium; Dover, DE	DESU-TV	L 27–41	3,124
October 22	1:30 pm	at South Carolina State	Oliver C. Dawson Stadium; Orangeburg, SC		L 3–30	15,489
October 29	4:00 pm	at Bethune–Cookman	Municipal Stadium; Daytona Beach, FL	CEN	L 10–41	7,822
November 5	2:00 pm	North Carolina Central	Alumni Stadium; Dover, DE	WDSU-TV	L 19–38	1,597
November 12	2:00 pm	No. 10 North Carolina A&T	Alumni Stadium; Dover, DE	WDSU-TV	L 14–45	1,389
November 19	1:00 pm	at Howard	William H. Greene Stadium; Washington, DC	WHBC	L 21–26	1,056
*Non-conference game; ^{†}Homecoming; Rankings from STATS Poll released prior to the game; All times are in Eastern time

== Game summaries ==
=== At Delaware ===
	1	2	3	4	Total
Hornets	0	0	7	7	14
Fightin' Blue Hens	14	14	21	7	56

=== Monmouth ===
	1	2	3	4	Total
Hawks	7	10	10	7	34
Hornets	0	0	13	7	20

=== At Missouri ===
	1	2	3	4	Total
Hornets	0	0	0	0	0
Tigers	30	28	14	7	79

=== At Morgan State ===
	1	2	3	4	Total
Hornets	7	3	0	7	17
Bears	6	8	3	3	20

=== Hampton ===
	1	2	3	4	Total
Pirates	14	3	10	0	27
Hornets	7	7	0	3	17

=== Florida A&M ===
	1	2	3	4	Total
Rattlers	10	10	0	21	41
Hornets	0	14	6	7	27

=== At South Carolina State ===
	1	2	3	4	Total
Hornets	0	3	0	0	3
Bulldogs	7	20	0	3	30

=== At Bethune–Cookman ===
	1	2	3	4	Total
Hornets	0	3	0	7	10
Wildcats	7	6	14	14	41

=== North Carolina Central ===
	1	2	3	4	Total
Eagles	9	22	7	0	38
Hornets	0	7	0	12	19

=== North Carolina A&T ===
	1	2	3	4	Total
#10 Aggies	7	14	14	10	45
Hornets	7	0	7	0	14

=== At Howard ===
	1	2	3	4	Total
Hornets	7	7	7	0	21
Bison	13	7	6	0	26
