= 2016 Hampton Pirates football team =

American college football season

2016 Hampton Pirates football
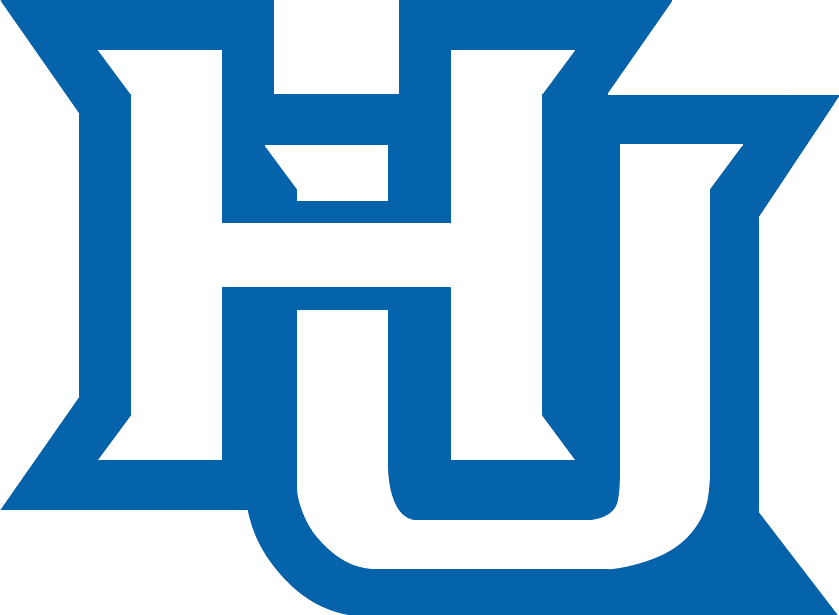
- Conference: Mid-Eastern Athletic Conference
- Record: 5–6 (5–3 MEAC)
- Head coach: Connell Maynor (3rd season)
- Defensive coordinator: Mike Ketchum (2nd season)
- Home stadium: Armstrong Stadium

2016 Mid-Eastern Athletic Conference football standings
	Conf.			Overall
Team	W		L	W		L
No. 22 North Carolina Central $	8	–	0	9	–	3
No. 20 North Carolina A&T ^	7	–	1	9	–	3
Hampton	5	–	3	5	–	6
South Carolina State	5	–	3	5	–	6
Bethune–Cookman	4	–	4	4	–	6
Florida A&M *	4	–	4	4	–	7
Norfolk State	3	–	5	4	–	7
Savannah State *	3	–	5	3	–	7
Morgan State *	3	–	5	3	–	8
Howard *	2	–	6	2	–	9
Delaware State	0	–	8	0	–	11
$ – Conference champion; ^ – FCS playoff participant; * Florida A&M, Howard, Morgan State, and Savannah State ineligible for postseason due to APR violations; Rankings from STATS Poll

The 2016 Hampton Pirates football team represented Hampton University in the 2016 NCAA Division I FCS football season. They were led by third-year head coach Connell Maynor and play their home games at Armstrong Stadium. They were a member of the Mid-Eastern Athletic Conference (MEAC). They finished the season 5–6, 5–3 in MEAC play to finish in a tie for third place.

== Schedule ==
Date	Time	Opponent	Site	TV	Result	Attendance
September 4	3:30 pm	at Old Dominion*	Foreman Field; Norfolk, VA	CUSA.tv	L 21–54	20,118
September 10	6:00 pm	No. 13 William & Mary*	Armstrong Stadium; Hampton, VA	PTV	L 14–24	4,412
September 17	3:30 pm	vs. Howard	RFK Stadium; Washington, D.C. (Nation's Football Classic/Battle of "The Real HU")	WHBC	W 34–7	13,068
September 29	7:30 pm	at No. 22 North Carolina A&T	Aggie Stadium; Greensboro, NC	ESPNU	L 9–31	14,467
October 8	2:00 pm	at Delaware State	Alumni Stadium; Dover, DE	WDSU-TV	W 27–17	1,309
October 15	2:00 pm	Morgan State^{†}	Armstrong Stadium; Hampton, VA	PTV	W 21–12	12,122
October 22	3:00 pm	at Florida A&M	Bragg Memorial Stadium; Tallahassee, FL	RV	L 14–31	26,044
October 29	1:00 pm	South Carolina State	Armstrong Stadium; Hampton, VA	PTV	W 28–26	2,152
November 12	1:00 pm	Savannah State	Armstrong Stadium; Hampton, VA	PTV	W 28–24	4,123
November 19	1:00 pm	Norfolk State	Armstrong Stadium; Hampton, VA (Battle of the Bay)	PTV	L 10–17	9,876
November 26	2:00 pm	at No. 15 Coastal Carolina*	Brooks Stadium; Conway, SC	CSN	L 7–26	5,921
*Non-conference game; ^{†}Homecoming; Rankings from STATS Poll released prior to the game; All times are in Eastern time

- Source: Schedule

== Game summaries ==
=== At Old Dominion ===
	1	2	3	4	Total
Pirates	7	7	7	0	21
Monarchs	14	17	9	14	54

=== William & Mary ===
	1	2	3	4	Total
#13 Tribe	7	0	14	3	24
Pirates	7	0	0	7	14

=== Vs. Howard ===
	1	2	3	4	Total
Pirates	0	7	24	3	34
Bison	0	0	0	7	7

=== At North Carolina A&T ===
	1	2	3	4	Total
Pirates	0	3	0	6	9
#22 Aggies	7	3	7	14	31

=== At Delaware State ===
	1	2	3	4	Total
Pirates	14	3	10	0	27
Hornets	7	7	0	3	17

=== Morgan State ===
	1	2	3	4	Total
Bears	6	6	0	0	12
Pirates	7	7	0	7	21

=== At Florida A&M ===
	1	2	3	4	Total
Pirates	0	7	0	7	14
Rattlers	7	10	0	14	31

=== South Carolina State ===
	1	2	3	4	Total
Bulldogs	7	13	0	6	26
Pirates	14	0	7	7	28

=== Savannah State ===
	1	2	3	4	Total
Tigers	0	10	7	7	24
Pirates	7	14	0	7	28

=== Norfolk State ===
	1	2	3	4	Total
Spartans	0	3	7	7	17
Pirates	3	0	7	0	10

=== At Coastal Carolina ===
	1	2	3	4	Total
Pirates	0	0	0	7	7
#15 Chanticleers	10	6	0	10	26
