= 2016 Florida A&M Rattlers football team =

American college football season

2016 Florida A&M Rattlers football
- Conference: Mid-Eastern Athletic Conference
- Record: 4–7 (4–4 MEAC)
- Head coach: Alex Wood (2nd season)
- Offensive coordinator: Martin Spieler (2nd season)
- Defensive coordinator: Theo Lemon (2nd season)
- Home stadium: Bragg Memorial Stadium

2016 Mid-Eastern Athletic Conference football standings
	Conf.			Overall
Team	W		L	W		L
No. 22 North Carolina Central $	8	–	0	9	–	3
No. 20 North Carolina A&T ^	7	–	1	9	–	3
Hampton	5	–	3	5	–	6
South Carolina State	5	–	3	5	–	6
Bethune–Cookman	4	–	4	4	–	6
Florida A&M *	4	–	4	4	–	7
Norfolk State	3	–	5	4	–	7
Savannah State *	3	–	5	3	–	7
Morgan State *	3	–	5	3	–	8
Howard *	2	–	6	2	–	9
Delaware State	0	–	8	0	–	11
$ – Conference champion; ^ – FCS playoff participant; * Florida A&M, Howard, Morgan State, and Savannah State ineligible for postseason due to APR violations; Rankings from STATS Poll

The 2016 Florida A&M Rattlers football team represented Florida A&M University in the 2016 NCAA Division I FCS football season. The Rattlers were led by second-year head coach Alex Wood. They played their home games at Bragg Memorial Stadium. They were a member of the Mid-Eastern Athletic Conference (MEAC). They finished the season 4–7, 4–4 in MEAC play to finish in a two way tie for fifth place.

== Schedule ==
Date	Time	Opponent	Site	TV	Result	Attendance
September 3	6:00 pm	at Miami (FL)*	Hard Rock Stadium; Miami Gardens, FL	ESPN3	L 3–70	65,326
September 10	7:00 pm	at Coastal Carolina*	Brooks Stadium; Conway, SC	ESPN3	L 10–49	10,037
September 17	7:00 pm	vs. Tuskegee*	Ladd–Peebles Stadium; Mobile, AL (5th Quarter Classic)	RV	L 17–20	19,223
September 24	6:00 pm	South Carolina State	Bragg Memorial Stadium; Tallahassee, FL	RV	L 14–48	19,127
October 1	6:00 pm	Savannah State	Bragg Memorial Stadium; Tallahassee, FL	RV	W 19–14	16,789
October 8	4:00 pm	at North Carolina Central	O'Kelly–Riddick Stadium; Durham, NC	NSN	L 13–17	617
October 15	2:00 pm	at Delaware State	Alumni Stadium; Dover, DE	WDSU-TV	W 41–27	3,124
October 22	3:00 pm	Hampton^{†}	Bragg Memorial Stadium; Tallahassee, FL	RV	W 31–14	26,044
October 29	1:00 pm	at No. 12 North Carolina A&T	Aggie Stadium; Greensboro, NC		L 17–42	22,150
November 12	4:00 pm	Morgan State	Bragg Memorial Stadium; Tallahassee, FL	RV	W 22–21	16,879
November 19	2:00 pm	vs. Bethune-Cookman	Florida Citrus Bowl Stadium; Orlando, FL (Florida Classic)	ESPN Classic	L 19–39	45,372
*Non-conference game; ^{†}Homecoming; Rankings from STATS Poll released prior to the game; All times are in Eastern time

- Source: Schedule

== Game summaries ==
=== @ Miami (FL) ===
Florida A&M @ Miami (FL)

Team	1	2	3	4	Total
Rattlers	0	3	0	0	3
• Hurricanes	14	14	42	0	70

- Date: September 3
- Location: Sun Life Stadium
  Miami, FL
- Game start: 6:00 PM EDT
- Game attendance: 65,326
- Television network: ESPN3

=== @ Coastal Carolina ===
Florida A&M @ Coastal Carolina

Team	1	2	3	4	Total
Rattlers	0	7	0	3	10
• #17 Chanticleers	22	14	6	7	49

- Date: September 10
- Location: Brooks Stadium
  Conway, SC
- Game start: 7:00 PM EDT
- Game attendance: 10,037
- Television network: ESPN3

=== vs Tuskegee ===
Florida A&M vs Tuskegee (5th Quarter Classic)

Team	1	2	3	4	Total
Rattlers	0	7	10	0	17
• Golden Tigers	6	7	0	7	20

- Date: September 17
- Location: Ladd–Peebles Stadium
  Mobile, AL
- Game start: 6:00 PM EDT
- Game attendance: 19,223
- Television network: RV

=== South Carolina State ===
South Carolina State @ Florida A&M

Team	1	2	3	4	Total
• Bulldogs	7	14	13	14	48
Rattlers	0	7	0	7	14

- Date: September 24
- Location: Bragg Memorial Stadium
  Tallahassee, FL
- Game start: 6:00 PM EDT
- Game attendance: 19,127
- Television network: RV

=== Savannah State ===
Savannah State @ Florida A&M

Team	1	2	3	4	Total
Tigers	0	7	0	7	14
• Rattlers	0	13	6	0	19

- Date: October 1
- Location: Bragg Memorial Stadium
  Tallahassee, FL
- Game start: 6:00 PM EST
- Game attendance: 16,789
- Television network: RV

=== North Carolina Central ===
North Carolina Central @ Florida A&M

Team	1	2	3	4	Total
Rattlers	5	0	0	8	13
• Eagles	0	3	0	14	17

- Date: October 8
- Location: O'Kelly–Riddick Stadium
  Durham, NC
- Game start: 4:00 PM EDT
- Game attendance: 617
- Television network: NSN

=== @ Delaware State ===
Florida A&M @ Delaware State

Team	1	2	3	4	Total
• Rattlers	10	10	0	21	41
Hornets	0	14	6	7	27

- Date: October 15
- Location: Alumni Stadium
  Dover, DE
- Game start: 2:00 PM EDT
- Game attendance: 3,124
- Television network: WDSU-TV

=== Hampton ===
Hampton @ Florida A&M

Team	1	2	3	4	Total
Pirates	0	7	0	7	14
• Rattlers	7	0	10	14	31

- Date: October 22
- Location: Bragg Memorial Stadium
  Tallahassee, FL
- Game start: 3:00 PM EDT
- Game attendance: 26,044
- Television network: RV

=== @ North Carolina A&T ===
Florida A&M @ North Carolina A&T

Team	1	2	3	4	Total
Rattlers	0	10	0	7	17
• #12 Aggies	7	14	14	7	42

- Date: October 29
- Location: Aggie Stadium
  Greensboro, NC
- Game start: 1:00 PM EDT
- Game attendance: 22,150
- Television network: LTV

=== Morgan State ===
Morgan State @ Florida A&M

Team	1	2	3	4	Total
Bears	14	0	7	0	21
• Rattlers	6	3	0	13	22

- Date: November 12
- Location: Bragg Memorial Stadium
  Tallahassee, FL
- Game start: 4:00 PM EST
- Game attendance: 16,879
- Television network: RV

=== vs Bethune-Cookman ===
Bethune-Cookman vs Florida A&M

Team	1	2	3	4	Total
• Wildcats	14	7	0	18	39
Rattlers	3	7	3	6	19

- Date: November 19
- Location: Florida Citrus Bowl Stadium
  Orlando, FL
- Game start: 2:00 PM EST
- Game attendance: 45,372
- Television network: ESPN Classic
