= 2016 South Carolina State Bulldogs football team =

American college football season

2016 South Carolina State Bulldogs football
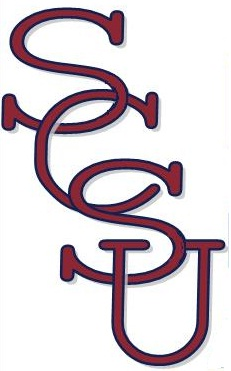
- Conference: Mid-Eastern Athletic Conference
- Record: 5–6 (5–3 MEAC)
- Head coach: Oliver Pough (15th season)
- Offensive coordinator: G. A. Mangus (1st season)
- Defensive coordinator: Kirk Botkin (1st season)
- Home stadium: Oliver C. Dawson Stadium

2016 Mid-Eastern Athletic Conference football standings
	Conf.			Overall
Team	W		L	W		L
No. 22 North Carolina Central $	8	–	0	9	–	3
No. 20 North Carolina A&T ^	7	–	1	9	–	3
Hampton	5	–	3	5	–	6
South Carolina State	5	–	3	5	–	6
Bethune–Cookman	4	–	4	4	–	6
Florida A&M *	4	–	4	4	–	7
Norfolk State	3	–	5	4	–	7
Savannah State *	3	–	5	3	–	7
Morgan State *	3	–	5	3	–	8
Howard *	2	–	6	2	–	9
Delaware State	0	–	8	0	–	11
$ – Conference champion; ^ – FCS playoff participant; * Florida A&M, Howard, Morgan State, and Savannah State ineligible for postseason due to APR violations; Rankings from STATS Poll

The 2016 South Carolina State Bulldogs football team represented South Carolina State University in the 2016 NCAA Division I FCS football season. They were led by 15th-year head coach Oliver Pough and played their home games at Oliver C. Dawson Stadium. They were a member of the Mid-Eastern Athletic Conference (MEAC). They finished the season 5–6, 5–3 in MEAC play to finish in a two way tie for third place.

== Schedule ==
Date	Time	Opponent	Site	TV	Result	Attendance
September 3	7:00 pm	at UCF*	Bright House Networks Stadium; Orlando, FL	ESPN3	L 0–38	36,260
September 10	7:00 pm	at Louisiana Tech*	Joe Aillet Stadium; Ruston, LA		L 24–53	16,910
September 17	12:00 pm	at No. 5 (FBS) Clemson*	Memorial Stadium; Clemson, SC	ACCRSN	L 0–59	79,590
September 24	6:00 pm	at Florida A&M	Bragg Memorial Stadium; Tallahassee, FL	RV	W 48–14	19,127
October 15	1:00 pm	at Howard	William H. Greene Stadium; Washington, D.C.	WHBC	W 14–9	2,759
October 22	1:30 pm	Delaware State^{†}	Oliver C. Dawson Stadium; Orangeburg, SC		W 30–3	15,489
October 29	1:00 pm	at Hampton	Armstrong Stadium; Hampton, VA	PTV	L 26–28	2,152
November 5	1:00 pm	at No. 11 North Carolina A&T	Aggie Stadium; Greensboro, NC (Rivalry)	LTV	L 20–30	11,357
November 12	2:00 pm	Norfolk State	Oliver C. Dawson Stadium; Orangeburg, SC		L 10–13	14,007
November 19	1:30 pm	Savannah State	Oliver C. Dawson Stadium; Orangeburg, SC		W 32–0	7,011
November 26^{[a]}	1:30 pm	Bethune-Cookman	Oliver C. Dawson Stadium; Orangeburg, SC		W 28–7	4,086
*Non-conference game; ^{†}Homecoming; Rankings from STATS Poll released prior to the game; All times are in Eastern time

^{^[a]}The game between South Carolina State and Bethune-Cookman, originally scheduled for October 8th, was postponed in advance of the arrival of Hurricane Matthew. The game was rescheduled for November 26 on October 7, 2016.

- Source: Schedule
