= 2016 Bethune–Cookman Wildcats football team =

American college football season

2016 Bethune–Cookman Wildcats football
- Conference: Mid-Eastern Athletic Conference
- Record: 4–6 (4–4 MEAC)
- Head coach: Terry Sims (2nd season)
- Offensive coordinator: Jim Pry
- Defensive coordinator: Charles Jones
- Home stadium: Municipal Stadium

2016 Mid-Eastern Athletic Conference football standings
	Conf.			Overall
Team	W		L	W		L
No. 22 North Carolina Central $	8	–	0	9	–	3
No. 20 North Carolina A&T ^	7	–	1	9	–	3
Hampton	5	–	3	5	–	6
South Carolina State	5	–	3	5	–	6
Bethune–Cookman	4	–	4	4	–	6
Florida A&M *	4	–	4	4	–	7
Norfolk State	3	–	5	4	–	7
Savannah State *	3	–	5	3	–	7
Morgan State *	3	–	5	3	–	8
Howard *	2	–	6	2	–	9
Delaware State	0	–	8	0	–	11
$ – Conference champion; ^ – FCS playoff participant; * Florida A&M, Howard, Morgan State, and Savannah State ineligible for postseason due to APR violations; Rankings from STATS Poll

The 2016 Bethune–Cookman Wildcats football team represented Bethune–Cookman University in the 2016 NCAA Division I FCS football season. They were led by second-year head coach Terry Sims and played their home games at Municipal Stadium. They were a member of the Mid-Eastern Athletic Conference (MEAC). They finished the season 4–6, 4–4 in MEAC play to finish in a two-way tie for fifth place.

== Schedule ==
Date	Time	Opponent	Site	TV	Result	Attendance
September 4	12:00 pm	Alcorn State*	Municipal Stadium; Daytona Beach, FL (MEAC/SWAC Challenge)	ESPN	No contest^{[a]}	
September 10	7:00 pm	at North Texas*	Apogee Stadium; Denton, TX	CUSA.tv	L 20–41	15,609
September 17	4:00 pm	Tennessee State*	Municipal Stadium; Daytona Beach, FL	CEN	L 24–31	9,385
September 24	7:00 pm	at Savannah State	Ted Wright Stadium; Savannah, GA	SSAA	L 10–16 ^{OT}	5,374
October 1	4:00 pm	North Carolina Central	Municipal Stadium; Daytona Beach, FL	CEN	L 14–31	4,216
October 15^{[b]}	1:00 pm	No. 15 North Carolina A&T	Municipal Stadium; Daytona Beach, FL	ESPN3, ESPNU (tape delay)	L 35–52	3,715
October 22	2:00 pm	at Norfolk State	William "Dick" Price Stadium; Norfolk, VA	ESPN3, ESPNU (tape delay)	W 21–14	3,618
October 29	4:00 pm	Delaware State^{†}	Municipal Stadium; Daytona Beach, FL	CEN	W 41–10	7,822
November 5	1:00 pm	at Morgan State	Hughes Stadium; Baltimore, MD		W 41–10	3,521
November 19	2:00 pm	vs. Florida A&M	Camping World Stadium; Orlando, FL (Florida Classic)	ESPN Classic	W 39–19	45,372
November 26^{[c]}	1:30 pm	at South Carolina State	Oliver C. Dawson Stadium; Orangeburg, SC		L 7–28	4,086
*Non-conference game; ^{†}Homecoming; Rankings from STATS Poll released prior to the game; All times are in Eastern time

^{^[a]}The game between Alcorn State and Bethune–Cookman was canceled due to inclement weather. The game was delayed due to lightning in the second quarter with 7:13 remaining. Alcorn was leading 13–7. Both schools' athletic directors decided not to reschedule the game, thus declaring it a "no contest".
^{^[b]}The game between North Carolina A&T and Bethune–Cookman was rescheduled from October 13, 2016 due to damages sustained to Daytona Beach from Hurricane Matthew.
^{^[c]}The game between South Carolina State and Bethune–Cookman was postponed in advance of the arrival of Hurricane Matthew. The game was rescheduled for November 26 on October 7, 2016.
Source: Schedule

== Game summaries ==
=== Alcorn State ===
	1	2	3	4	Total
Braves					0
Wildcats					0

- Game was cancelled due to inclement weather and was declared a "no contest".

=== At North Texas ===
	1	2	3	4	Total
Wildcats	7	0	6	7	20
Mean Green	7	17	10	7	41

=== Tennessee State ===
	1	2	3	4	Total
Tigers	3	14	7	7	31
Wildcats	7	10	0	7	24

=== At Savannah State ===
	1	2	3	4	OT	Total
Wildcats	3	0	0	7	0	10
Tigers	0	10	0	0	6	16

=== North Carolina Central ===
	1	2	3	4	Total
Eagles	0	7	10	14	31
Wildcats	7	0	0	7	14

=== North Carolina A&T ===
	1	2	3	4	Total
#15 Aggies	14	7	3	28	52
Wildcats	7	7	7	14	35

=== At Norfolk State ===
	1	2	3	4	Total
Wildcats	7	14	0	0	21
Spartans	7	0	0	7	14

=== Delaware State ===
	1	2	3	4	Total
Hornets	0	3	0	7	10
Wildcats	7	6	14	14	41

=== At Morgan State ===
	1	2	3	4	Total
Wildcats	10	10	7	14	41
Bears	3	0	7	0	10

=== Vs. Florida A&M ===
	1	2	3	4	Total
Wildcats	14	7	0	18	39
Rattlers	3	7	3	6	19

=== At South Carolina State ===
	1	2	3	4	Total
Wildcats	0	7	0	0	7
Bulldogs	7	7	7	7	28
