= 2016 Howard Bison football team =

American college football season

2016 Howard Bison football
- Conference: Mid-Eastern Athletic Conference
- Record: 2–9 (2–6 MEAC)
- Head coach: Gary Harrell (5th season)
- Offensive coordinator: B. T. Sherman (1st season)
- Defensive coordinator: Rayford Petty (6th season)
- Home stadium: William H. Greene Stadium

2016 Mid-Eastern Athletic Conference football standings
	Conf.			Overall
Team	W		L	W		L
No. 22 North Carolina Central $	8	–	0	9	–	3
No. 20 North Carolina A&T ^	7	–	1	9	–	3
Hampton	5	–	3	5	–	6
South Carolina State	5	–	3	5	–	6
Bethune–Cookman	4	–	4	4	–	6
Florida A&M *	4	–	4	4	–	7
Norfolk State	3	–	5	4	–	7
Savannah State *	3	–	5	3	–	7
Morgan State *	3	–	5	3	–	8
Howard *	2	–	6	2	–	9
Delaware State	0	–	8	0	–	11
$ – Conference champion; ^ – FCS playoff participant; * Florida A&M, Howard, Morgan State, and Savannah State ineligible for postseason due to APR violations; Rankings from STATS Poll

The 2016 Howard Bison football team represented Howard University as a member of the Mid-Eastern Athletic Conference (MEAC) during the 2016 NCAA Division I FCS football season. Led by Gary Harrell in his fifth and final season as head coach, the Bison compiled an overall record of 2–9 with a mark of 2–6, placing tenth in the MEAC. Howard played home games at William H. Greene Stadium in Washington, D.C.

Harrell's contract was renewed after the season. He finished his tenure at Howard with a record of 20–36.

== Schedule ==
Date	Time	Opponent	Site	TV	Result	Attendance
September 3	12:00 pm	at Maryland*	Maryland Stadium; College Park, MD	BTN	L 13–52	35,474
September 10	12:00 pm	at Rutgers*	High Point Solutions Stadium; Piscataway, NJ	BTN	L 14–52	45,245
September 17	3:30 pm	vs. Hampton	Robert F. Kennedy Memorial Stadium; Washington, DC (Nation's Football Classic, The Real HU)	WHBC	L 7–34	13,068
September 24	7:00 pm	at Morgan State	Hughes Stadium; Baltimore, MD (rivalry)	SPORTSfever TV, ESPN3	L 24–28	4,423
October 1	2:00 pm	at Norfolk State	William "Dick" Price Stadium; Norfolk, VA	SSC	W 33–28	6,618
October 8	1:00 pm	Monmouth*	William H. Greene Stadium; Washington, DC	WHBC	L 27–59	453
October 15	1:00 pm	South Carolina State	William H. Greene Stadium; Washington, DC	WHBC	L 9–14	2,759
October 22	1:00 pm	No. 14 North Carolina A&T^{†}	William H. Greene Stadium; Washington, DC	WHBC	L 7–34	7,086
October 29	1:00 pm	at Savannah State	Ted Wright Stadium; Savannah, GA	SSAA	L 27–31	8,119
November 12	2:00 pm	at North Carolina Central	O'Kelly–Riddick Stadium; Durham, NC	NSN	L 21–30	6,897
November 19	1:00 pm	Delaware State	William H. Greene Stadium; Washington, DC	WHBC	W 26–21	1,056
*Non-conference game; ^{†}Homecoming; Rankings from STATS Poll released prior to the game; All times are in Eastern time

== Game summaries ==
=== At Maryland ===
	1	2	3	4	Total
Bison	0	0	0	13	13
Terrapins	21	14	7	10	52

=== At Rutgers ===
	1	2	3	4	Total
Bison	14	0	0	0	14
Scarlet Knights	7	7	21	17	52

=== Vs. Hampton ===
	1	2	3	4	Total
Pirates	0	7	24	3	34
Bison	0	0	0	7	7

=== At Morgan State ===
	1	2	3	4	Total
Bison	7	3	8	6	24
Bears	21	0	0	7	28

=== At Norfolk State ===
	1	2	3	4	Total
Bison	6	6	13	8	33
Spartans	21	0	0	7	28

=== Monmouth ===
	1	2	3	4	Total
Hawks	10	21	21	7	59
Bison	7	7	6	7	27

=== South Carolina State ===
	1	2	3	4	Total
Bulldogs	0	7	0	7	14
Bison	0	3	6	0	9

=== North Carolina A&T ===
	1	2	3	4	Total
#14 Aggies	14	6	14	0	34
Bison	0	0	0	7	7

=== At Savannah State ===
	1	2	3	4	Total
Bison	0	10	3	14	27
Tigers	14	7	3	7	31

=== At North Carolina Central ===
	1	2	3	4	Total
Bison	7	0	0	14	21
Eagles	6	3	7	14	30

=== Delaware State ===
	1	2	3	4	Total
Hornets	7	7	7	0	21
Bison	13	7	6	0	26
