= 2016 Morgan State Bears football team =

American college football season

2016 Morgan State Bears football
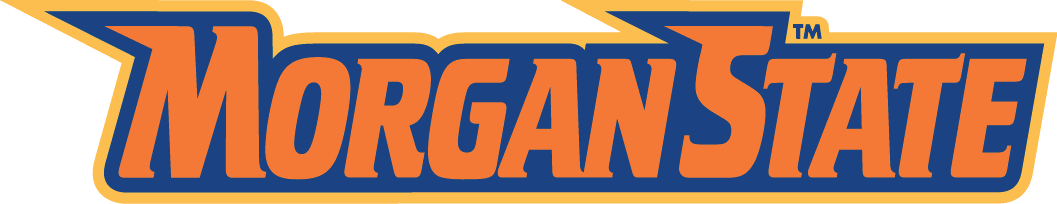
- Conference: Mid-Eastern Athletic Conference
- Record: 3–8 (3–5 MEAC)
- Head coach: Fred Farrier (3rd overall / 1st as interim head coach season)
- Offensive coordinator: Fred Farrier
- Defensive coordinator: Mike Fanoga (1st season)
- Home stadium: Hughes Stadium

2016 Mid-Eastern Athletic Conference football standings
	Conf.			Overall
Team	W		L	W		L
No. 22 North Carolina Central $	8	–	0	9	–	3
No. 20 North Carolina A&T ^	7	–	1	9	–	3
Hampton	5	–	3	5	–	6
South Carolina State	5	–	3	5	–	6
Bethune–Cookman	4	–	4	4	–	6
Florida A&M *	4	–	4	4	–	7
Norfolk State	3	–	5	4	–	7
Savannah State *	3	–	5	3	–	7
Morgan State *	3	–	5	3	–	8
Howard *	2	–	6	2	–	9
Delaware State	0	–	8	0	–	11
$ – Conference champion; ^ – FCS playoff participant; * Florida A&M, Howard, Morgan State, and Savannah State ineligible for postseason due to APR violations; Rankings from STATS Poll

The 2016 Morgan State Bears football team represented Morgan State University in the 2016 NCAA Division I FCS football season. They were led by interim head coach Frederick Farrier, who was appointed to the position after Lee Hull accepted a position with the Indianapolis Colts of the National Football League. The Bears played their home games at Hughes Stadium. They were a member of the Mid-Eastern Athletic Conference (MEAC). They finished the season 3–8, 3–5 in MEAC play to finish in a three-way tie for seventh place.

== Schedule ==
Date	Time	Opponent	Site	TV	Result	Attendance
September 3	2:00 pm	Holy Cross*	Hughes Stadium; Baltimore, MD		L 24–51	4,203
September 10	6:00 pm	at Marshall*	Joan C. Edwards Stadium; Huntington, WV	beIN	L 0–62	26,488
September 24	7:00 pm	Howard	Hughes Stadium; Baltimore, MD (rivalry)	SPORTSfever TV, ESPN3	W 28–24	4,423
October 1	1:00 pm	Delaware State	Hughes Stadium; Baltimore, MD		W 20–17	1,386
October 15	2:00 pm	at Hampton	Armstrong Stadium; Hampton, VA	PTV	L 12–21	12,122
October 22	1:00 pm	North Carolina Central	Hughes Stadium; Baltimore, MD		L 17–21	8,534
October 29	2:00 pm	at Norfolk State	William "Dick" Price Stadium; Norfolk, VA	SSC	L 14–27	18,405
November 5	1:00 pm	Bethune-Cookman	Hughes Stadium; Baltimore, MD		L 10–41	3,521
November 12	4:00 pm	at Florida A&M	Bragg Memorial Stadium; Tallahassee, FL	RV	L 21–22	16,879
November 19	12:00 pm	at Army*	Michie Stadium; West Point, NY	CBSSN	L 3–60	28,290
November 26^{[a]}	1:00 pm	at Savannah State	Ted Wright Stadium; Savannah, GA	SSAA	W 35–24	1,267
*Non-conference game; All times are in Eastern time

^{^[a]}The game between Morgan State and Savannah State was postponed in advance of the arrival of Hurricane Matthew. The game was rescheduled for November 26 on October 7, 2016.

- Source: Schedule
