= 2016 Norfolk State Spartans football team =

American college football season

2016 Norfolk State Spartans football
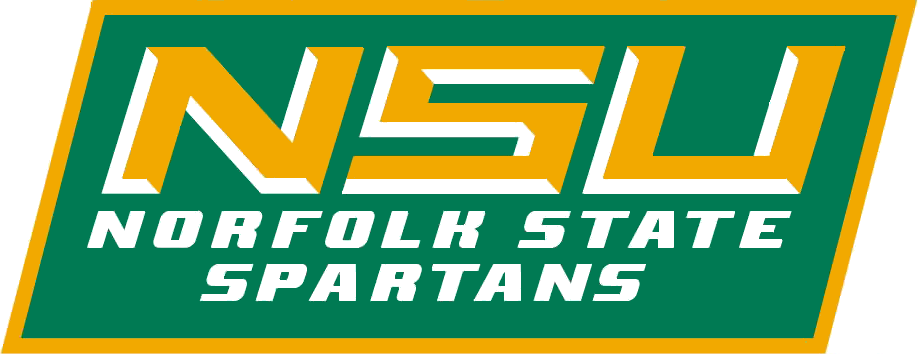
- Conference: Mid-Eastern Athletic Conference
- Record: 4–7 (3–5 MEAC)
- Head coach: Latrell Scott (2nd season)
- Offensive coordinator: Mike Faragalli (1st season)
- Co-defensive coordinators: Andrew Faison (1st season); Cornell Brown (1st season)
- Home stadium: William "Dick" Price Stadium

2016 Mid-Eastern Athletic Conference football standings
	Conf.			Overall
Team	W		L	W		L
No. 22 North Carolina Central $	8	–	0	9	–	3
No. 20 North Carolina A&T ^	7	–	1	9	–	3
Hampton	5	–	3	5	–	6
South Carolina State	5	–	3	5	–	6
Bethune–Cookman	4	–	4	4	–	6
Florida A&M *	4	–	4	4	–	7
Norfolk State	3	–	5	4	–	7
Savannah State *	3	–	5	3	–	7
Morgan State *	3	–	5	3	–	8
Howard *	2	–	6	2	–	9
Delaware State	0	–	8	0	–	11
$ – Conference champion; ^ – FCS playoff participant; * Florida A&M, Howard, Morgan State, and Savannah State ineligible for postseason due to APR violations; Rankings from STATS Poll

The 2016 Norfolk State Spartans football team represented Norfolk State University in the 2016 NCAA Division I FCS football season. They were led by second-year head coach Latrell Scott and played their home games at William "Dick" Price Stadium. They were a member of the Mid-Eastern Athletic Conference (MEAC). They finished the season 4–7, 3–5 in MEAC play to finish in a three way tie for seventh place.

== Schedule ==
Date	Time	Opponent	Site	TV	Result	Attendance
September 4	6:00 pm	Elizabeth City State*	William "Dick" Price Stadium; Norfolk, VA (Labor Day Classic)	SSC	W 20–12	11,780
September 10	6:00 pm	at No. 2 Richmond*	Robins Stadium; Richmond, VA	CSN	L 0–34	8,700
September 17	6:00 pm	at No. 13 William & Mary*	Zable Stadium; Williamsburg, VA	TATV	L 10–35	10,240
September 24	2:00 pm	North Carolina Central	William "Dick" Price Stadium; Norfolk, VA	SSC	L 31–34	8,296
October 1	2:00 pm	Howard	William "Dick" Price Stadium; Norfolk, VA	SSC	L 28–33	6,618
October 6	7:30 pm	at No. 18 North Carolina A&T	Aggie Stadium; Greensboro, NC	ESPNU	L 0–35	13,005
October 22	2:00 pm	Bethune-Cookman	William "Dick" Price Stadium; Norfolk, VA	ESPN3, ESPNU (Tape Delay)	L 14–21	3,618
October 29	2:00 pm	Morgan State^{†}	William "Dick" Price Stadium; Norfolk, VA	SSC	W 27–14	18,405
November 5	5:00 pm	at Savannah State	Ted Wright Stadium; Savannah, GA	SSAA	L 14–31	3,147
November 12	2:00 pm	at South Carolina State	Oliver C. Dawson Stadium; Orangeburg, SC		W 13–10	14,007
November 19	1:00 pm	at Hampton	Armstrong Stadium; Hampton, VA (Battle of the Bay)	PTV	W 17–10	9,876
*Non-conference game; ^{†}Homecoming; Rankings from STATS Poll released prior to the game; All times are in Eastern time

- Source: Schedule
