= 2016 Savannah State Tigers football team =

American college football season

2016 Savannah State Tigers football
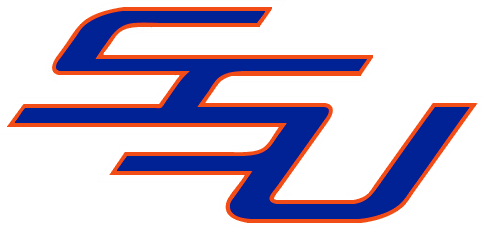
- Conference: Mid-Eastern Athletic Conference
- Record: 3-7 (2-6 MEAC)
- Head coach: Erik Raeburn (1st season)
- Offensive coordinator: Bill Rychel (1st season)
- Defensive coordinator: Chad Williams (1st season)
- Home stadium: Ted A. Wright Stadium

2016 Mid-Eastern Athletic Conference football standings
	Conf.			Overall
Team	W		L	W		L
No. 22 North Carolina Central $	8	–	0	9	–	3
No. 20 North Carolina A&T ^	7	–	1	9	–	3
Hampton	5	–	3	5	–	6
South Carolina State	5	–	3	5	–	6
Bethune–Cookman	4	–	4	4	–	6
Florida A&M *	4	–	4	4	–	7
Norfolk State	3	–	5	4	–	7
Savannah State *	3	–	5	3	–	7
Morgan State *	3	–	5	3	–	8
Howard *	2	–	6	2	–	9
Delaware State	0	–	8	0	–	11
$ – Conference champion; ^ – FCS playoff participant; * Florida A&M, Howard, Morgan State, and Savannah State ineligible for postseason due to APR violations; Rankings from STATS Poll

The 2016 Savannah State Tigers football team represented Savannah State University in the 2016 NCAA Division I FCS football season. The Tigers were members of the Mid-Eastern Athletic Conference (MEAC). They were led by first-year head coach Erik Raeburn and played their home games at Ted Wright Stadium. They finished the season 3-7, 2-6 in MEAC play to finish in a three way tie for seventh place.

== Schedule ==
Date	Time	Opponent	Site	TV	Result	Attendance
September 3	6:00 pm	at Georgia Southern*	Paulson Stadium; Statesboro, GA	ESPN3	L 0–54	21,250
September 10	7:00 pm	at Southern Miss*	M.M. Roberts Stadium; Hattiesburg, MS		L 0–56	29,509
September 24	7:00 pm	Bethune-Cookman	Ted Wright Stadium; Savannah, GA	SSAA	W 16–10 ^{OT}	5,374
October 1	6:00 pm	at Florida A&M	Bragg Memorial Stadium; Tallahassee, FL	RV	L 14–19	16,789
October 15	2:00 pm	at North Carolina Central	O'Kelly–Riddick Stadium; Durham, NC	NSN	L 3–33	12,966
October 29	2:00 pm	Howard^{†}	Ted Wright Stadium; Savannah, GA	SSAA	W 31–27	8,119
November 5	1:00 pm	Norfolk State	Ted Wright Stadium; Savannah, GA	SSAA	W 31–14	3,147
November 12	1:00 pm	at Hampton	Armstrong Stadium; Hampton, VA	PTV	L 24–28	4,123
November 19	1:30 pm	at South Carolina State	Oliver C. Dawson Stadium; Orangeburg, SC		L 0–32	7,011
November 26^{[a]}	1:00 pm	Morgan State	Ted Wright Stadium; Savannah, GA	SSAA	L 24–35	1,267
*Non-conference game; ^{†}Homecoming; All times are in Eastern time

^{^[a]}The game between Savannah State and Morgan State was postponed in advance of the arrival of Hurricane Matthew. The game was rescheduled for November 26 on October 7, 2016.

- Source: Schedule
