= MEAC/SWAC Challenge =

Annual American college football game

- Cricket MEAC/SWAC Challenge
- Stadium: Center Parc Stadium
- Location: Atlanta, Georgia
- Previous stadiums: Legion Field (2005–2007); Camping World Stadium (2008–2013, 2015); Spectrum Stadium (2014); Municipal Stadium (2016); A. W. Mumford Stadium (2017)
- Previous locations: Birmingham, Alabama (2005–2007); Orlando, Florida (2008–2015); Daytona Beach, Florida (2016); Baton Rouge, Louisiana (2017)
- Operated: 2005–present
- Conference tie-ins: Mid-Eastern Athletic Conference (MEAC); Southwestern Athletic Conference (SWAC)
- Website: meacswacchallenge.com

Sponsors
- ESPN (2005–present); Ford (2005–2006); Walt Disney World Resort (2008–2015); Cricket Wireless (2020–present)

Former names
- Ford MEAC/SWAC Challenge (2005–2006); MEAC/SWAC Challenge presented by Disney (2008–2015)

The MEAC/SWAC Challenge is an annual historically black college (HBCU) football game showcasing a team from each of the two NCAA Division I conferences made up entirely of HBCUs—the Mid-Eastern Athletic Conference (MEAC) and Southwestern Athletic Conference (SWAC). (Note: All full members of both conferences are HBCUs, but the MEAC has non-HBCU affiliate members in select non-football sports.) The series began in 2005 and initially paired the defending conference champions, although the selection process was broadened in 2007 to include non-champions as well. The series record currently stands at 11 wins for the MEAC to the SWAC's seven (along with a "no contest" game in 2016, and a cancellation in 2020). The Challenge is televised nationally on ESPN and is owned by ESPN Events. It was historically associated with the Labor Day weekend, but starting in 2021 has instead taken place a week earlier during college football's Week 0.

== History ==
South Carolina State beat Alabama State in the first Challenge in 2005, and for its first three years the event was held in Birmingham, Alabama (home of the SWAC's offices), at Legion Field. In 2007, the event attracted its largest crowd—over 30,000—as Southern beat Florida A&M and earned the SWAC's first victory in the series. In 2008, the Challenge moved to Orlando, Florida after a new sponsorship was announced; Walt Disney World Resort would sponsor the event for eight years until 2015. From 2008 to 2013, as well as in 2015, it was held in Orlando at the Florida Citrus Bowl, now called Camping World Stadium. In 2014, the game was played at Spectrum Stadium, now known as FBC Mortgage Stadium, as Camping World Stadium underwent renovations.

In April 2016, it was announced that the game would move to campus sites for 2016 and 2017 (on September 4, 2016, Bethune–Cookman attempted to host Alcorn State in Daytona Beach, Florida, but the game was halted before halftime due to lightning associated with feeder bands from Hurricane Hermine; on September 3, 2017, Southern hosted South Carolina State in Baton Rouge, Louisiana). The event moved to a non-HBCU campus venue in 2018—this time at Center Parc Stadium on the campus of Georgia State University in Atlanta. (Note: The legal definition of an HBCU is an institution founded before the enactment of the Civil Rights Act of 1964 primarily to educate African Americans. Georgia State was founded in 1913, but did not admit its first African-American students until 1962. GSU is now classified by the U.S. federal government as a "Predominantly Black Institution", defined as an institution that does not meet the legal definition of an HBCU, but with a majority of undergraduates receiving need-based financial aid and at least 40% African-American undergraduate enrollment.)

Nine future NFL draft picks have played in the Challenge. They are Phillip Adams (South Carolina State), Michael Coe (Alabama State), Johnny Culbreath (South Carolina State), Justin Durant (Hampton), Javon Hargrave (South Carolina State), Temarrick Hemingway (South Carolina State), Curtis Holcomb (Florida A&M), Tarvaris Jackson (Alabama State), and Kendall Langford (Hampton).

The 2020 game, as well as the Celebration Bowl, were both canceled due to the COVID-19 pandemic (in particular, due to a decision by the MEAC to cancel all fall sports for the 2020 season).

== Game results ==
Year	MEAC representative		SWAC representative		Attendance	Location
2005	South Carolina State Bulldogs	27	Alabama State Hornets	14	18,452	Legion Field (Birmingham, Alabama)
2006	No. 13 Hampton Pirates	27	No. 23 Grambling State Tigers	26 ^{OT}	19,175	Legion Field (Birmingham, Alabama)
2007	Florida A&M Rattlers	27	Southern Jaguars	33	30,106	Legion Field (Birmingham, Alabama)
2008	Hampton Pirates	17	Jackson State Tigers	13	10,723	Florida Citrus Bowl (Orlando, Florida)
2009	No. 16 South Carolina State Bulldogs	34	No. 25 Grambling State Tigers	31	21,367	Florida Citrus Bowl (Orlando, Florida)
2010	Delaware State Hornets	27	Southern Jaguars	37	16,327	Florida Citrus Bowl (Orlando, Florida)
2011	Bethune–Cookman Wildcats	63	Prairie View A&M Panthers	14	17,337	Florida Citrus Bowl (Orlando, Florida)
2012	Bethune–Cookman Wildcats	38	Alabama State Hornets	28	17,410	Florida Citrus Bowl (Orlando, Florida)
2013	Florida A&M Rattlers	27	Mississippi Valley State Delta Devils	10	24,376	Florida Citrus Bowl (Orlando, Florida)
2014	North Carolina A&T Aggies	47	Alabama A&M Bulldogs	13	8,210	Spectrum Stadium (Orlando, Florida)
2015	South Carolina State Bulldogs	35	Arkansas–Pine Bluff Golden Lions	7	7,257	Orlando Citrus Bowl (Orlando, Florida)
2016	Bethune–Cookman Wildcats	7	Alcorn State Braves	13	6,000	Municipal Stadium (Daytona Beach, Florida)
2017	South Carolina State Bulldogs	8	Southern Jaguars	14	10,006	A. W. Mumford Stadium (Baton Rouge, Louisiana)
2018	North Carolina Central Eagles	24	Prairie View A&M Panthers	40	10,274	Center Parc Stadium (Atlanta)
2019	Bethune–Cookman Wildcats	36	Jackson State Tigers	15	23,333	Center Parc Stadium (Atlanta)
2020	Game canceled due to COVID-19. Originally South Carolina State v Grambling State.					Center Parc Stadium (Atlanta)
2021	North Carolina Central Eagles	23	Alcorn State Braves	14	15,215	Center Parc Stadium (Atlanta)
2022	Howard Bison	13	Alabama State Hornets	23	21,088	Center Parc Stadium (Atlanta)
2023	South Carolina State Bulldogs	7	Jackson State Tigers	37	24,238	Center Parc Stadium (Atlanta)
2024	Norfolk State Spartans	23	Florida A&M Rattlers	24	22,210	Center Parc Stadium (Atlanta)
2025	North Carolina Central Eagles	31	Southern Jaguars	14	16,191	Center Parc Stadium (Atlanta)
2026	Howard Bison	31	Alabama A&M Bulldogs	24	17,320	Center Parc Stadium (Atlanta)
2027	Morgan State Bears		Alabama State Hornets			Center Parc Stadium (Atlanta)
2028	Norfolk State Spartans		Jackson State Tigers			Center Parc Stadium (Atlanta)
2029	South Carolina State Bulldogs		Alcorn State Braves			Center Parc Stadium (Atlanta)

#: Score is unofficial. With 7:14 remaining in the second quarter (22:46 point of game), the game was delayed due to lightning for nearly three hours. After several unsuccessful attempts to restart the game, the game was called no contest because the game had not yet reached official status.

== See also ==
- List of black college football classics
