= Truist Stadium (North Carolina A&T) =

Multi-purpose stadium in Greensboro, North Carolina

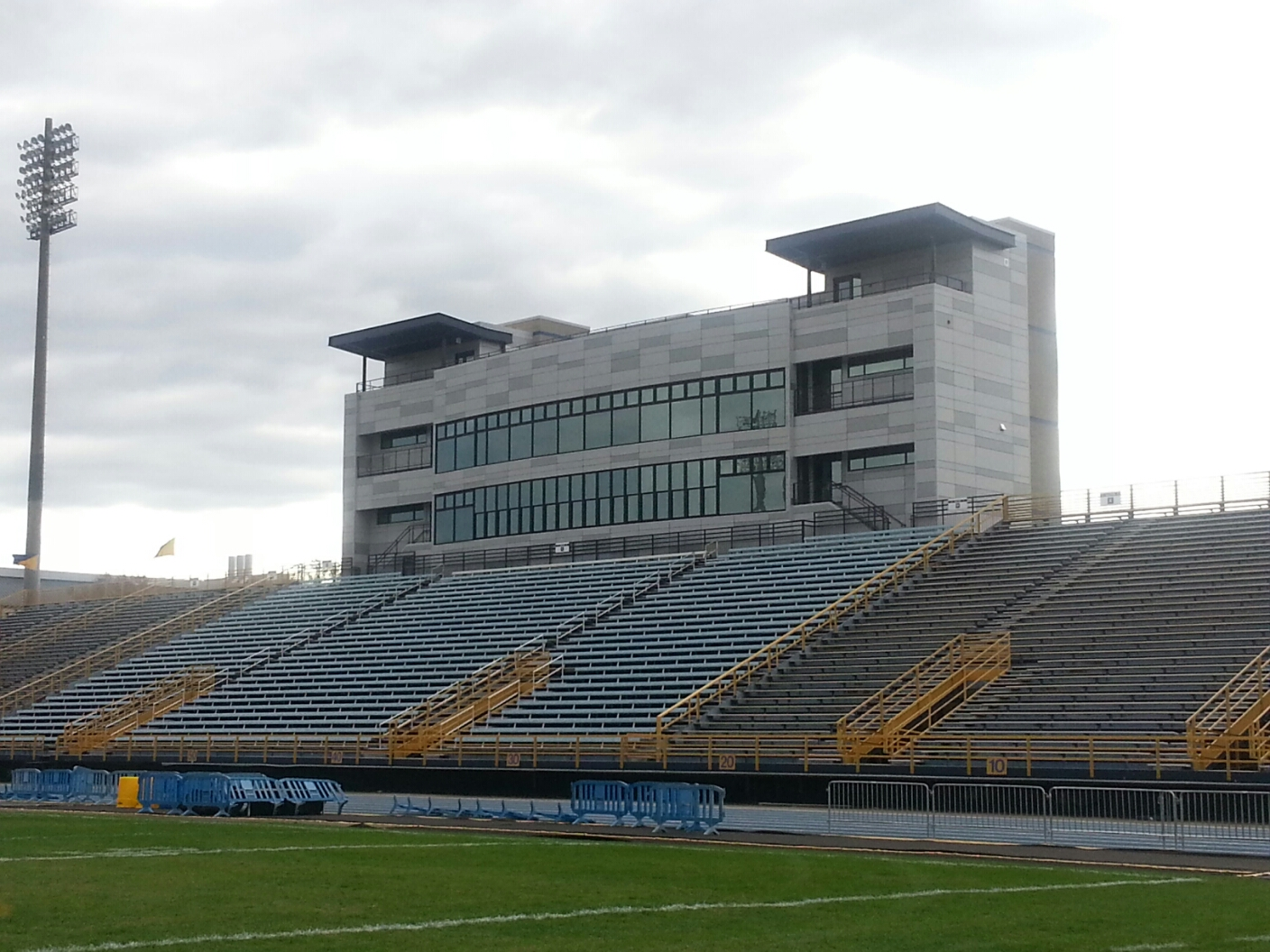
- Interactive map of Truist Stadium
- Former names: Aggie Stadium (1966–2018); BB&T Stadium (2018–2020)
- Location: Sullivan & E. Lindsey Streets; Greensboro, North Carolina 27405
- Coordinates: 36°4′53″N 79°46′13″W
- Owner: NC A&T State University
- Operator: NC A&T State University
- Capacity: 17,500 (1981–1995); 21,500 (1995–present)
- Surface: Bermuda Grass
- Record attendance: 34,769 (2001)

Construction
- Groundbreaking: 1980
- Opened: September 12, 1981
- Renovated: 1999, 2003, 2011, 2015
- Expanded: 1995, 2003
- Cost: $2.5 million ($8.85 million in 2025 dollars) $4.5 Million (2011 Renovation) ($6.44 million in 2025 dollars)
- Architects: Jason H. Jones, AIA; Clark-Nexsen (2011 Renovation)
- General contractors: J.H. Allen Construction Company; Kenbridge Construction Company (2011 Renovation)

Tenant
- North Carolina A&T Aggies football (NCAA) (1981–present)

Truist Stadium, formerly Aggie Stadium, is a 21,500-seat multi-purpose stadium in Greensboro, North Carolina. It is located at the north end of the North Carolina A&T State University campus.

W. Edward Jenkins, a North Carolina A&T alumnus and architect, designed the stadium. Opened in 1981, the stadium is the home of the North Carolina A&T Aggies football team and the Irwin Belk Olympic class track. In addition, Truist Stadium features a "Fitness and Wellness Center". This 25,000 square feet (2,300 m^{2}) fitness facility sits behind the scoreboard in the stadium's northeastern corner.

== History ==
Before the construction of Truist Stadium, North Carolina A&T Aggies played their home football games at Greensboro's War Memorial Stadium, which was also home to Greensboro's minor league baseball franchise. The university saw a great need for an on-campus stadium to accommodate the growing number of fans attending home football games. The stadium, designed by architect W. Edward Jenkins, a North Carolina A&T alumnus, was constructed at a cost of more than $2.5 million. The stadium opened in 1981 and the first game played there was on September 12, 1981, against rival Winston-Salem State University, drawing an overflow crowd of more than 23,000 fans. To date, the largest single-game attendance at Truist Stadium was set in 2001, when 34,769 people attended a football game against the Rattlers of Florida A&M University.

=== Expansion and improvements ===
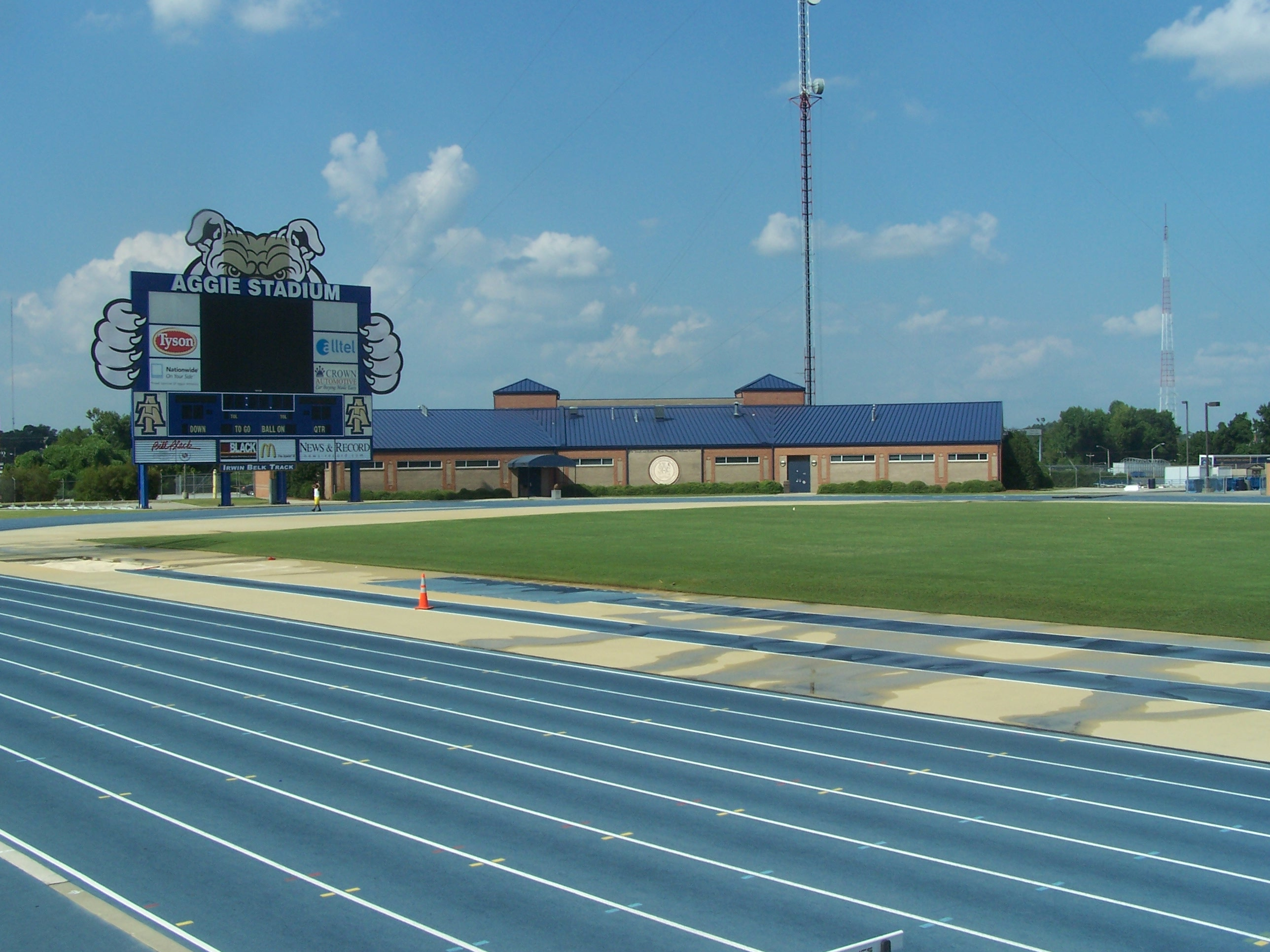
The "Aggievision" Scoreboard and Joseph & Kathleen Bryan Center In the North Endzone of Truist Stadium

The original plans for the stadium called for a seating capacity of 20,000 people, but due to the increased cost of materials, the plan was scaled back to 17,500. For the first 14 years of operation, the stadium's permanent seating capacity stood at 17,500. However, in 1995 the stadium underwent a major expansion in which 5,000 additional seats were added in the south end zone area to complete the current horseshoe shape and raise the seating capacity to over 21,000. In 1999, a donation by the Ford Motor Company allowed for the construction of stadium lights for night games and an electronic marquee outside the stadium grounds.

In 2001, the university opened the Joseph and Kathleen Bryan Fitness and Wellness Center behind the stadium's northeast end zone. Three years later, the Irwin Belk Track was finally completed. The facility is named after the former president of Belk Department Stores and a major financial contributor to the project. the Mondo Super X Performance track features eight 48-inch lanes and wide turns. During the 2004 off season, the scoreboard in the north end zone was removed and replaced with a digital scoreboard and replay screen from Daktronics. The new addition named "Agggievision" measured at approximately 66 feet (20 m) high and 48 feet (15 m) wide and was equipped with a 23-foot (7.0 m) video screen and sound system. The most visible addition to Truist Stadium is the 10,000-square-foot (930 m^{2}) Sky Box complete with a Chancellor's Suite, facilities for press and coaches, as well as leasable luxury suites. The project was designed by Jason H. Jones, AIA, with Clark Nexsen's Charlotte Office, and was completed in April in time for the 2012 Football season. For the 2015 season, Aggievision was upgraded with a larger HD replay screen and LED panels.

=== Non football events ===
- International Friendship & Freedom Games (2009, 2010)
- Mid-Eastern Athletic Conference Outdoor Track and Field Championships (2008–Present)
- Murray Neely Invitational (2009-2010)
- NCAA Division I Track and Field Championships – East Regional (2006, 2009–Present)
- NCHSAA Track and Field Championships (2005–present)
- New Balance Outdoor Nationals (formerly the Nike Outdoor Nationals) (2005–Present)
- Russell E. Blunt East Coast Invitational (2004–2005)
- State Games of North Carolina (2007)
- USATF National Junior Olympic Track & Field Championships (2006–Present)

== Photo gallery ==
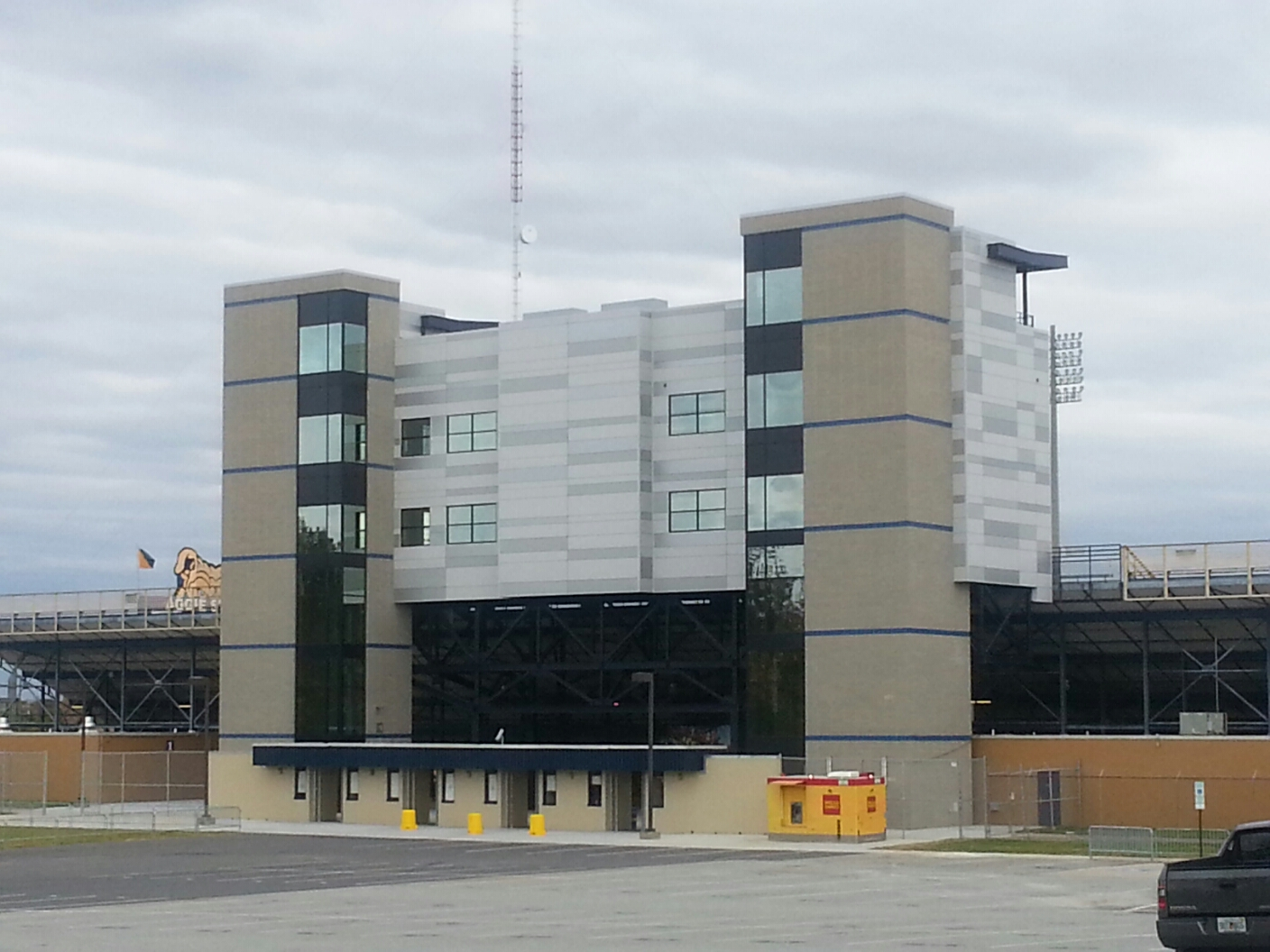
West End Entrance and Press Box Exterior.

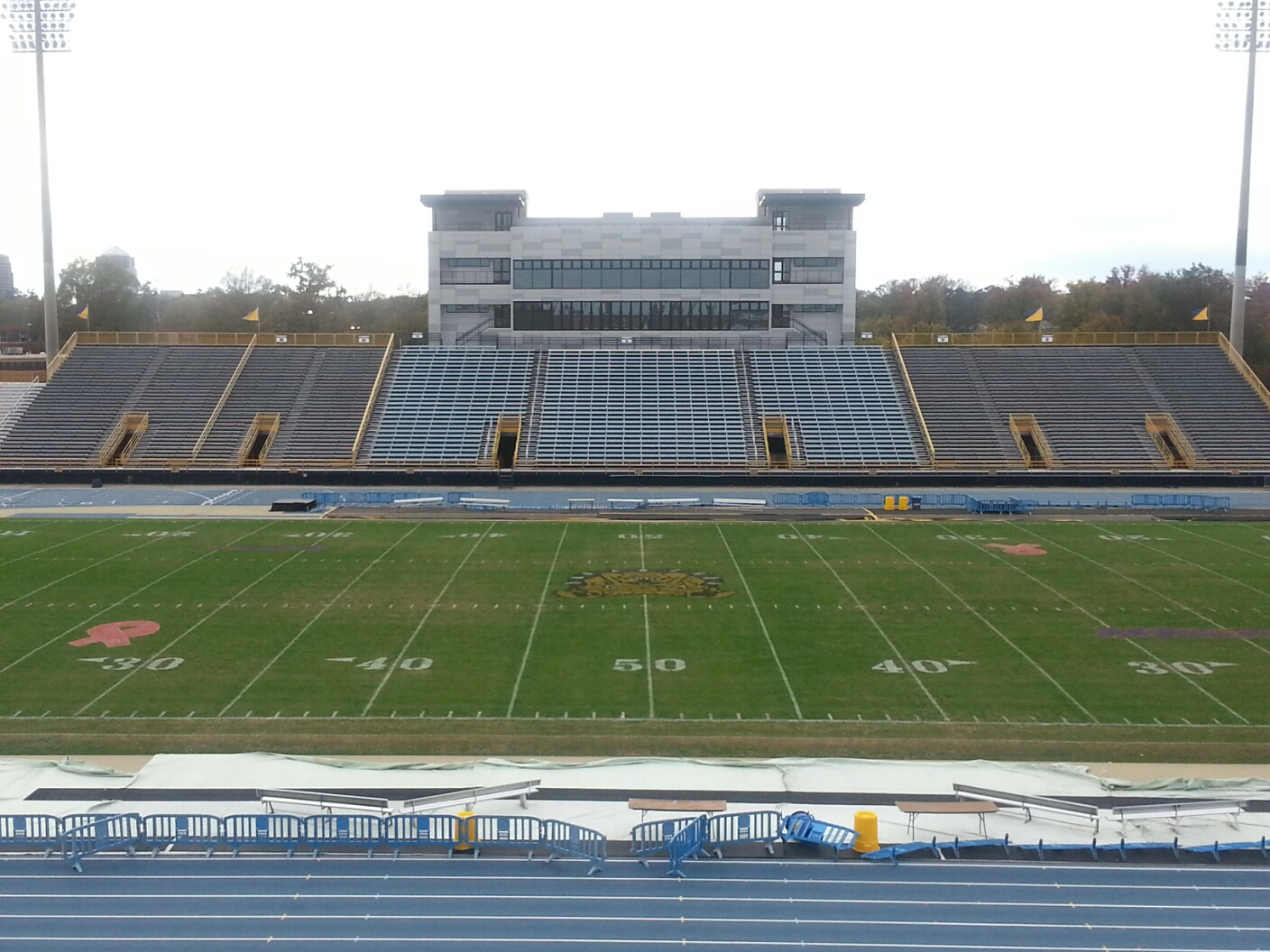
West End Interior and Press Box.

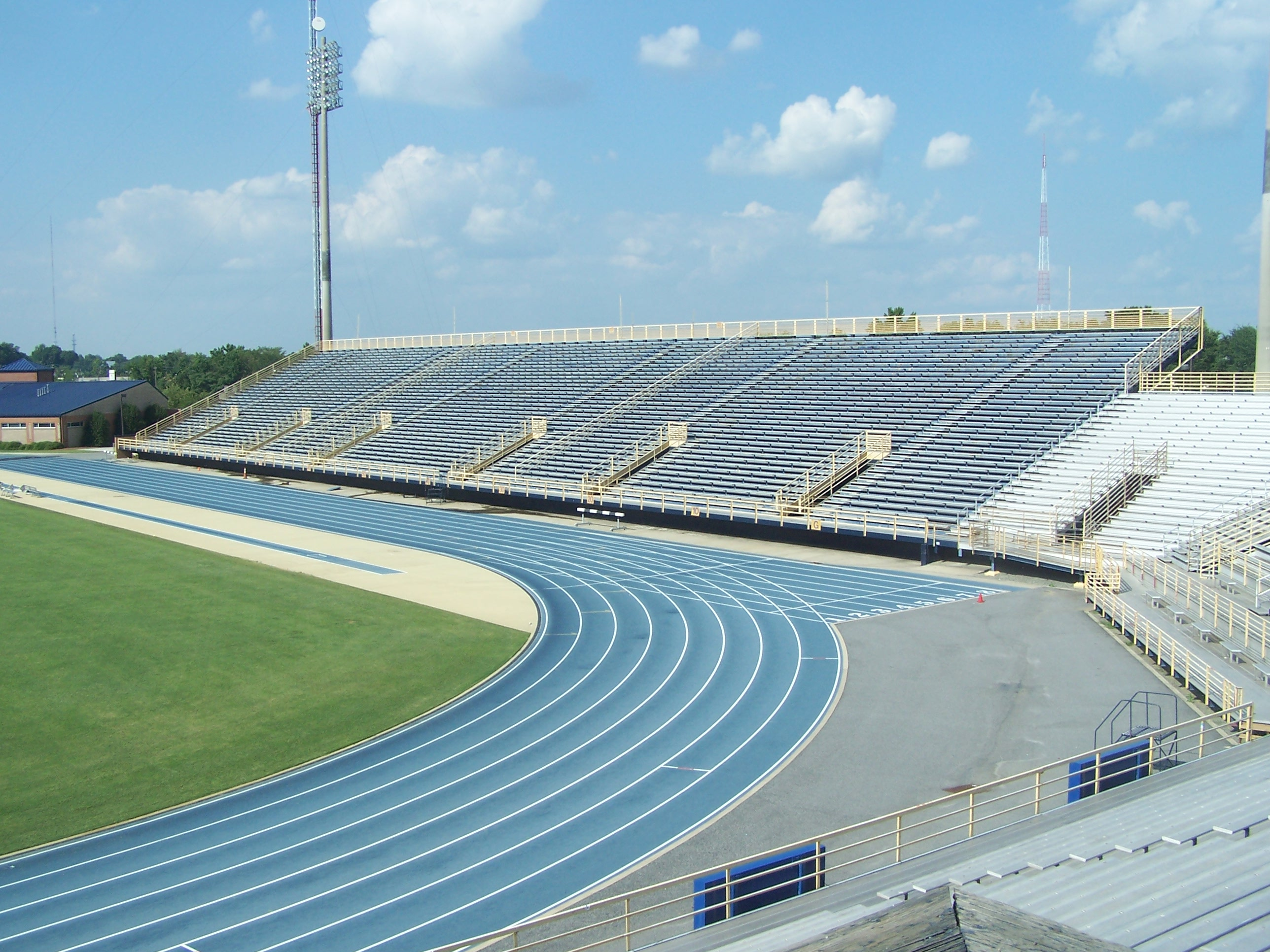
East Side Interior and Track.

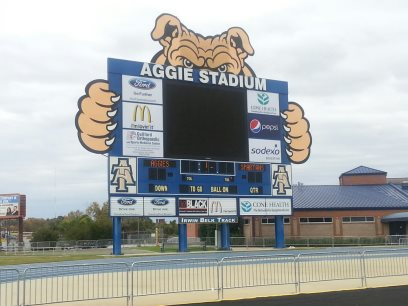
The "Aggievision" Scoreboard in the North endzone of Truist Stadium in 2012.

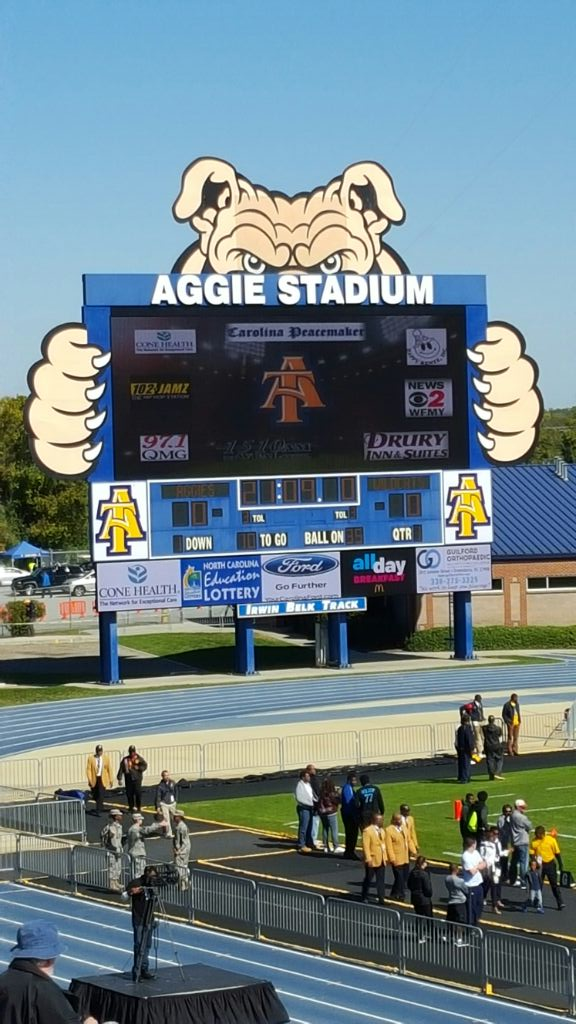
Newly Updated Aggievision Scoreboard with HD Screen in 2015.

The Joseph and Kathleen Bryan Fitness and Wellness Center.

== See also ==
- List of NCAA Division I FCS football stadiums

Preceded by War Memorial Stadium	Home of the North Carolina A&T Aggies; 1981–present	Succeeded by Current
