= Alumni Stadium (Delaware State) =

Football stadium in Dover, Delaware

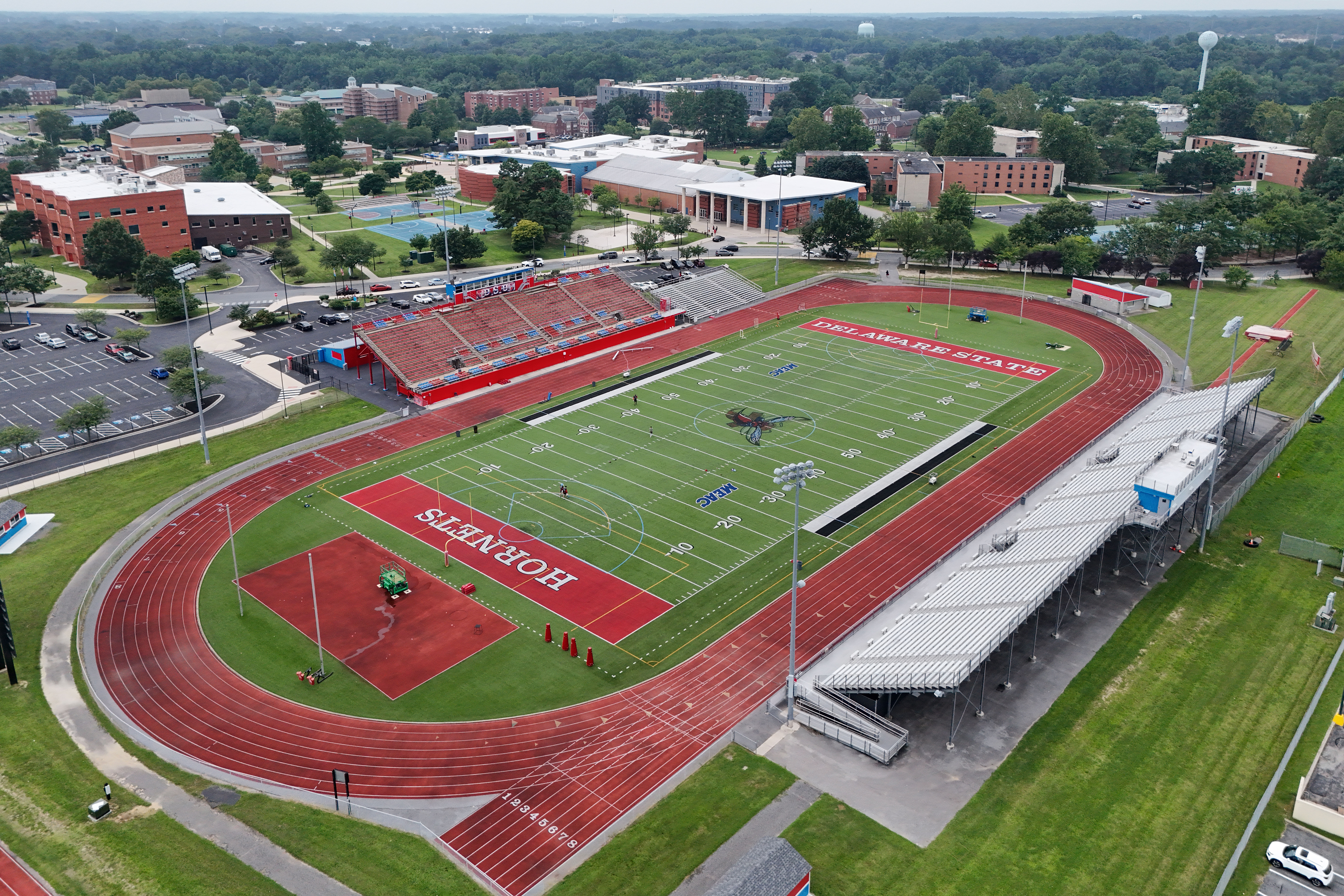
- The stadium in 2025
- Interactive map of Alumni Stadium
- Location: 1282 North Dupont Highway; Dover, Delaware 19901
- Coordinates: 39°11′21″N 75°32′36″W
- Owner: Delaware State University
- Operator: Delaware State University Department of Athletics
- Capacity: 7,193
- Surface: TenCate Thiolon turf
- Public transit: DART First State bus: 109, 112, 301

Construction
- Opened: 1957

Tenants
- Delaware State Hornets football (NCAA) (1957–present) Delaware State Hornets Outdoor Track & Field (1957–present) Delaware State Hornets Women's Soccer (2011–2022) Delaware State Hornets Women's Lacrosse (2013–2022)

Alumni Stadium is a 7,193-seat multi-purpose stadium in Dover, Delaware. It is home to the Delaware State University Hornets football team and outdoor men's and women's track and field teams. The facility opened in 1957.

== History ==
Alumni Stadium opened in 1957 and has served as the home of Delaware State Hornets football ever since. It is a multi-purpose venue originally built for college football and track, and today hosts the university's football and outdoor track teams. Historically, the women's soccer and lacrosse teams also played at Alumni Stadium until Delaware State acquired Wesley College in 2021 and moved the teams to Drass Field. For decades the stadium saw only minor changes — from 1957 through the 2010s it remained largely unchanged. In particular, much of the original metal bleacher seating and basic facilities date to the 1957 construction. A modern Daktronics video scoreboard was added in 2015 (replacing an old board), and locker rooms have been renovated only in part. Overall, the core stadium structure — concrete stands with a press box — has endured for over 60 years.

== Capacity and facilities ==
The stadium's seating capacity is approximately 7,200 (7,193 as of 2024). The field is covered with artificial turf (a TenCate Thiolon surface), and an eight-lane track encircles the playing field for track & field events. The stands are simple open-air bleachers: the south side has some chair-backed seats, while the north side is all bench bleachers. A small press box sits atop the stands. There are no premium suites or club areas. Lighting for night games is present but basic. In 2015 DSU installed a large video scoreboard (18×24 ft Daktronics display) to improve the game experience (and a new sound system was added). Ancillary facilities at the stadium are limited: player locker rooms, restrooms, and a ticket office; as of the mid-2020s these are considered dated. Planned upgrades: DSU's Athletics Transformation plan calls for complete renovation of stadium locker rooms, and a new football operations building (locker rooms and meeting space) in Conwell Hall. Future phases envision replacing the main grandstand and adding premium seating and suites.

== Comparisons ==
With its ~7,200-seat capacity, Alumni Stadium is small for the NCAA Division I FCS level. Many FCS peers play in venues of 10,000–20,000 seats or more, whereas DSU’s stadium is one of the smallest in the MEAC/CAA conferences. For example, 25 FCS programs play in stadiums holding at least 20,000 fans, far above Alumni Stadium’s size. The stadium's amenities (bleachers, minimal press box, few luxury features) are often compared to a large high school facility rather than a modern Division I college venue. Delaware State officials have acknowledged this gap: President Tony Allen noted that unchanged stadium facilities have given some visitors "the impression it’s Dover High School".

== Notable events ==
Beyond DSU home games, Alumni Stadium has hosted state sports championships. Most notably, in 2024 and 2025 Delaware's high-school football state championship games (Class 1A, 2A, 3A finals and unified flag) were held at Alumni Stadium. (These games were moved from the University of Delaware due to high rental costs at Delaware's larger stadium.) The stadium is also occasionally used for other special events: it has hosted track meets (e.g. annual Delaware State track invite) and women's lacrosse/soccer playoff matches. (DSU's own women's lacrosse and soccer teams use Alumni Stadium for home games.) In past years, the stadium has been used for various community events, though no large concerts or non-sporting events have been regularly held there.

== Criticisms ==
Local media and alumni frequently cite Alumni Stadium's outdated condition. In reports on DSU’s facilities drive, writers note the stadium "has remained largely unchanged since its opening in 1957" and that major upgrades are long overdue. DSU leaders have echoed this, saying the stadium's locker rooms and press facilities look "like Dover High School". Capacity has also drawn criticism: the modest size constrains ticket revenue and game atmosphere. After an especially crowded homecoming game in 2023, some fans complained about limited seating and amenities. These criticisms underlie the current renovation plans: DSU's athletic director and president have stressed that improved football facilities are needed to remain competitive and attract recruits.

== Recent and planned upgrades ==
In 2024–2025 Delaware State unveiled an ambitious athletics transformation. Key to this was $20 million in state funding (bond bill in July 2025) for a new 70,000 sq ft indoor field house adjacent to Alumni Stadium. The planned field house will include a 50-yard indoor turf practice field, team meeting rooms, a player lounge and modernized locker rooms for football and other sports. (Gov. Carney's bond bill also supported a $90M convocation center for basketball, but that is separate from the stadium.) In stadium‐specific plans, DSU has proposed a phased renovation: Phase I involves renovating current locker rooms and building a football operations facility. Phase II envisions a new grandstand ("Alumni Stadium Project") with about 6,000 premium seats, executive suites and enhanced fan spaces. These plans are backed by a $125 M funding request from DSU: in April 2025 the university sought $10 M specifically for stadium and downtown facility upgrades, along with $25 M for the fieldhouse and $90 M for the convocation center. As of late 2025, construction on the field house has not yet begun, but DSU officials expect to start within 18–24 months. In the meantime, incremental improvements (new video board, renovated visitor stands, cosmetic repairs) have been made or are underway.

== See also ==
- List of NCAA Division I FCS football stadiums
