= Hughes Stadium (Morgan State) =

Stadium in Maryland

- The Den
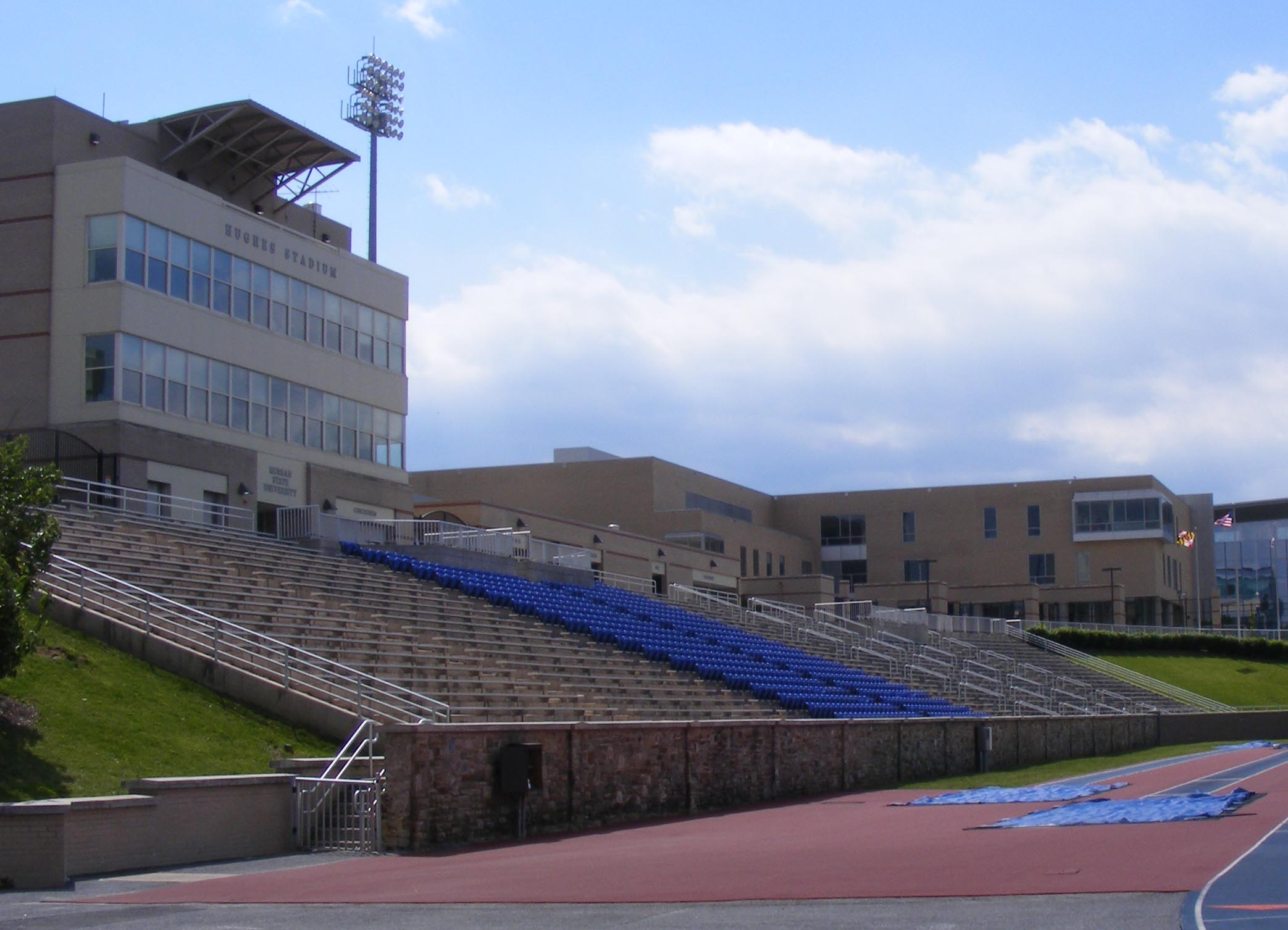
- Interactive map of Hughes Stadium
- Former names: Morgan Stadium
- Location: 1700 East Cold Spring Lane; Baltimore, Maryland 21239
- Coordinates: 39°20′37″N 76°34′59″W
- Owner: Morgan State University
- Operator: Morgan State University
- Capacity: 10,001
- Surface: Fieldturf

Construction
- Groundbreaking: 1937
- Opened: October 16, 1937
- Renovated: 2001
- Cost: $360,000

Tenants
- Morgan State Bears football Baltimore Nighthawks

Hughes Stadium, also known as The Den, is a multi-purpose stadium in Baltimore, Maryland. It is primarily used for football and is home of the Morgan State Bears. The stadium opened in 1937 and currently has a capacity of 10,001. Hughes Stadium features two separate seating structures behind both sidelines.

== Gallery ==
Hughes Stadium scoreboard

== See also ==
- List of NCAA Division I FCS football stadiums
