= List of North Carolina A&T Aggies head football coaches =

This list of North Carolina A&T Aggies head football coaches includes those coaches who have led the North Carolina A&T Aggies football team that represents North Carolina Agricultural and Technical State University in the sport of American football. The Aggies currently compete in the Division I Football Championship Subdivision (FCS) of the National Collegiate Athletic Association (NCAA) and CAA Football, the technically separate football league operated by the Aggies' primary home conference, the Coastal Athletic Association (CAA).

Nineteen men have served as the Aggies' head coach, including one who has served as interim head coach, since the Aggies began play in the fall of 1924. In February 2011, Rod Broadway was named the new head coach of the Aggies, and the following year, led the team in its first winning season in nine years. Since the inception of the program, six coaches have let the Aggies in postseason bowl games: Charles DeBerry, William Bell, Bert Piggott, Hornsby Howell, Mo Forte, Bill Hayes, George Small, & Rod Broadway. Eight Aggie coaches have led their teams to conference championships during their tenure, with Bill Hayes and Burt Piggott both winning the most at three each. Three Aggie coaches have won the Black college football national championship during their tenures; Hornsby Howell in 1968, and Bill Hayes in 1990 and 1999, and Rod Broadway in 2015.

== Key ==
Key to symbols in coaches list
| General | | Overall | | Conference | | Postseason (Note: Although the first Rose Bowl Game was played in 1902, it has been continuously played since the 1916 game, and is recognized as the oldest bowl game by the NCAA. "—" indicates any season prior to 1916 when postseason games were not played.) | |
|---|---|---|---|---|---|---|---|
| No. | Order of coaches (Note: A running total of the number of head coaches, with coaches who served separate tenures being counted only once. Interim head coaches are represented with "Int" and are not counted in the running total. "—" indicates the team played but either without a coach or no coach is on record. "X" indicates an interim year without play.) | GC | Games coached | CW | Conference wins | PW | Postseason wins |
| DC | Division championships | OW | Overall wins | CL | Conference losses | PL | Postseason losses |
| CC | Conference championships | OL | Overall losses | CT | Conference ties | PT | Postseason ties |
| NC | National championships | OT | Overall ties (Note: Overtime rules in college football were introduced in 1996, making ties impossible in the period since.) | C% | Conference winning percentage | | |
| † | Elected to the College Football Hall of Fame | O% | Overall winning percentage (Note: When computing the win–loss percentage, a tie counts as half a win and half a loss.) | | | | |

== Coaches ==
List of head football coaches showing season(s) coached, overall records, conference records, postseason records, championships and selected awards. (Note: Statistics correct as of the end of the 2023 NCAA Division I FCS football season.)
| No. | Name | Season(s) (Note: North Carolina A&T did not field teams from 1902–1905, 1907–1911, 1913, & 1917–1920"North Carolina A&T Yearly Totals". cfbdatawarehouse.com. College Football Data Warehouse. Archived from the original on October 6, 2014.) | GC | OW | OL | OT | O% | CW | CL | CT | C% | PW | PL | PT | CC | NC | Awards |
|---|---|---|---|---|---|---|---|---|---|---|---|---|---|---|---|---|---|
| — | Unknown (Note: All athletic records prior to 1924 were lost.) | 1901–1922 | 24 | 7 | 12 | 5 | 0.396 | — | — | — | — | — | — | — | — | 0 | — |
| 1 | Lonnie P. Byarm | 1923–1930 | 73 | 38 | 25 | 10 | 0.589 | 20 | 17 | 9 | 0.533 | — | — | — | 1 | 0 | — |
| 2 | Harry R. Jefferson | 1931–1932 | 16 | 5 | 11 | 0 | 0.313 | 5 | 8 | 0 | 0.385 | — | — | — | 0 | 0 | — |
| 3 | Inman A. Breaux | 1933–1936; 1938–1939 | 53 | 28 | 17 | 8 | 0.604 | 25 | 12 | 7 | 0.648 | — | — | — | 0 | 0 | — |
| 4 | S. A. Barksdale | 1937 | 9 | 2 | 4 | 3 | 0.389 | 3 | 5 | 1 | 0.357 | — | — | — | 0 | 0 | — |
| 5 | Homer Harris | 1940 | 9 | 4 | 4 | 1 | 0.500 | 3 | 3 | 0 | 0.500 | — | — | — | 0 | 0 | — |
| 6 | Roland K. Bernard | 1941 | 9 | 3 | 6 | 0 | 0.333 | 2 | 5 | 0 | 0.286 | — | — | — | 0 | 0 | — |
| 7 | Charles U. DeBerry | 1942–1944 | 25 | 13 | 12 | 1 | 0.519 | 5 | 8 | 0 | 0.385 | 1 | 1 | 0 | 0 | 0 | — |
| 8 | Charles W. Carter | 1945 | 9 | 3 | 5 | 1 | 0.389 | 2 | 3 | 0 | 0.400 | — | — | — | 0 | 0 | — |
| 9 | William M. Bell | 1946–1956 | 100 | 56 | 37 | 7 | 0.595 | 38 | 27 | 7 | 0.563 | — | — | — | 1 | 1 (Note: In 1951, North Carolina A&T was awarded a national title outside of the Black college national championship.) | — |
| 10 | Bert Piggott | 1957–1967 | 99 | 56 | 39 | 4 | 0.586 | 55 | 14 | 3 | 0.785 | — | — | — | 3 | 0 | — |
| 11 | Hornsby Howell | 1968–1976 | 93 | 55 | 34 | 4 | 0.613 | 29 | 17 | 3 | 0.622 | — | — | — | 1 | 1 | CIAA Coach of the year (1974,1975) |
| 12 | James McKinley | 1977–1981 | 68 | 30 | 37 | 1 | 0.449 | 15 | 17 | 1 | 0.467 | 1 | 1 | 0 | 0 | 0 | MEAC Coach of the year (1980) |
| 13 | Mo Forte | 1982–1987 | 65 | 26 | 38 | 1 | 0.408 | 8 | 14 | 0 | 0.364 | 0 | 1 | 0 | 1 | 0 | MEAC Coach of the year (1986) |
| 14 | Bill Hayes | 1988–2002 | 170 | 106 | 64 | 0 | 0.624 | 0 | 0 | 0 | .000 | 1 | 3 | 0 | 3 | 2 | MEAC Coach of the year (1991, 1999) |
| 15 | George Small | 2003–2005 | 35 | 16 | 19 | 0 | 0.457 | 9 | 13 | 0 | 0.409 | 0 | 1 | 0 | 1 | 0 | — |
| 16 | Lee Fobbs (Note: Lee Fobbs was fired from his position as coach on October 21, 2008. As of that date his season record was 2-6."NC A&T fires football coach". USAToday.com. The Associated Press.) | 2005–2008 | 30 | 2 | 28 | 0 | 0.067 | 0 | 21 | 0 | .000 | 0 | 0 | 0 | 0 | 0 | — |
| INT | George Ragsdale (Note: George Ragsdale was named interim coach on October 21, 2008; He finished the 2008 season with a 1–3 record.) | 2008 | 4 | 1 | 3 | 0 | 0.250 | 1 | 3 | 0 | 0.250 | 0 | 0 | 0 | 0 | 0 | — |
| 17 | Alonzo Lee | 2009–2010 | 22 | 6 | 16 | 0 | 0.273 | 4 | 12 | 0 | 0.333 | 0 | 0 | 0 | 0 | 0 | — |
| 18 | Rod Broadway | 2011–2017 | 79 | 57 | 22 | 0 | 0.722 | 41 | 15 | 0 | 0.732 | 2 | 1 | 0 | 3 | 2 | MEAC Coach of the year (2017) |
| 19 | Sam Washington | 2018–2022 | 46 | 31 | 15 | 0 | 0.674 | 19 | 8 | 0 | 0.704 | 2 | 0 | 0 | 2 | 0 | |
| 20 | Vincent Brown | 2023–2024 | 23 | 2 | 21 | 0 | 0.087 | 0 | 16 | 0 | .000 | 0 | 0 | 0 | 0 | 0 | |
| 21 | Shawn Gibbs | 2025–present | 12 | 2 | 10 | 0 | 0.167 | 2 | 6 | 0 | 0.250 | 0 | 0 | 0 | 0 | 0 | |
