= North Carolina A&T Aggies =

Intercollegiate sports teams of North Carolina A&T State University

- University: North Carolina A&T State University
- Conference: Coastal Athletic Association (primary); CAA Football (football); MEAC (women's bowling)
- NCAA: Division I (FCS)
- Athletic director: Earl Hilton
- Location: Greensboro, North Carolina
- Varsity teams: 17
- Football stadium: Truist Stadium
- Basketball arena: Ellis F. Corbett Sports Center
- Baseball stadium: War Memorial Stadium
- Mascot: Aggie & Aggietha (Bulldogs)
- Nickname: Aggies
- Fight song: Old Aggie Spirit
- Colors: Blue and gold
- Website: ncataggies.com
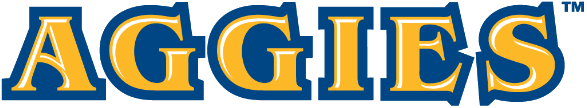

The North Carolina A&T Aggies are the athletic teams that represent North Carolina Agricultural and Technical State University in Greensboro, North Carolina, United States. The Aggies compete in NCAA Division I and are members of the Coastal Athletic Association (CAA) in all sports with the exception of football and women's bowling. North Carolina A&T fields varsity teams in 13 sports, five for men and eight for women. The football team competes in Division I Football Championship Subdivision (FCS), formerly known as Division I-AA, in the CAA's technically separate football arm of CAA Football.

Home football games are played at Truist Stadium, while basketball, volleyball, and swimming events are held at the Ellis F. Corbett Sports Center. The university's baseball team plays at War Memorial Stadium.

The athletic director for the university is Earl M. Hilton III. Hilton assumed the position on February 3, 2011, after being named as interim on October 25, 2010. Hilton became director of athletics as a result of the removal of former director Wheeler Brown. Hilton most recently served as assistant vice chancellor of student affairs and has also served as the associate athletics director for North Carolina A&T. Hilton's previous experience includes a position as assistant athletics director at Buffalo State University and academic tutor for athletics at Texas Tech University.

== Sports sponsored ==
North Carolina A&T sponsors athletic teams in 7 men's and 8 women's NCAA sanctioned sports: As of 2023, all sports, with the exception of football and women's bowling compete in the Coastal Athletic Association (CAA). The football team competed in the Big South Conference in the 2022 season before moving to CAA Football, the technically separate football league operated by the all-sports CAA, in 2023. The bowling program competes as an affiliate member of the Mid-Eastern Athletic Conference (MEAC), where the Aggies previously held membership from 1970 to 2021.

| Men's sports | Women's sports |
|---|---|
| Baseball | Basketball |
| Basketball | Bowling |
| Cross country | Cross country |
| Football | Golf |
| Golf | Softball |
| Tennis | Tennis |
| Track and field | Track and field |
| | Volleyball |
† – Track and field includes both indoor and outdoor

=== Football ===
The Aggies are led by head coach Shawn Gibbs. Gibbs was named head coach ahead of the 2025 season, following then head coach Vincent Brown being relieved of his duties. The 2017 season was arguably the most successful in the program's history with the Aggies finishing the season with a 12–0 undefeated record; breaking the record for number of wins in a single season that was previously held by the 1990 team; and capturing both the MEAC championship and 2017 Celebration Bowl championship over Grambling. Coach William "Bill" Hayes holds the distinction of the all-time most winningest coach in Aggie history, with a record of: 106 victories, 64 losses, and 1 tied game.

Over the years, North Carolina A&T has developed intense rivalries with Winston-Salem State University, South Carolina State University, and North Carolina Central University. The rivalry between the Aggies and North Carolina Central University dates back to 1924. Numerous players from North Carolina A&T have played in the National Football League (NFL). They include NFL Hall of Fame member Elvin Bethea, Dwaine Board, Curtis Deloatch, Jason Horton, Maurice Hicks, Jamal Jones, Mel Phillips, Junius Coston, Jesse Britt, Maurice Smith, and George Small.

The Aggies play home football games at Truist Stadium. The stadium, then known as Aggie Stadium, opened in 1981. Before the construction of the stadium, the Aggies played their home football games at Greensboro's World War Memorial Stadium, which was home to the nearby minor league baseball franchise.

| Year | Coach | Conference | Overall record | Conference record |
|---|---|---|---|---|
| 1927 | Lonnie P. Byarm | CIAA | 8–0–0 | 7–0–0 |
| 1950 | William M. Bell | CIAA | 6–2–1 | 5–0–1 |
| 1958 | Bert C. Piggott | CIAA | 7–2–0 | 7–0–0 |
| 1959 | Bert C. Piggott | CIAA | 6–2–0 | 6–0–0 |
| 1964 | Bert C. Piggott | CIAA | 6–3–1 | 6–0–1 |
| 1975 (Note: North Carolina A&T shared the 1975 MEAC championship with the South Carolina State Bulldogs) | Hornsby Howell | MEAC | 5–1–0 | 6–0 |
| 1986 | Maurice "Mo" Forte | MEAC | 9–3–0 | 4–1–0 |
| 1991 | William "Bill" Hayes | MEAC | 9–3–0 | 5–1–0 |
| 1992 | William "Bill" Hayes | MEAC | 9–3–0 | 5–1–0 |
| 1999 | William "Bill" Hayes | MEAC | 11–2–0 | 8–0 |
| 2003 | George Small | MEAC | 10–3–0 | 6–1–0 |
| 2014 (Note: The 2014 MEAC championship was shared between Bethune–Cookman, Morgan State, North Carolina Central & South Carolina State) | Rod Broadway | MEAC | 9–3–0 | 6–2–0 |
| 2015 (Note: The 2015 MEAC championship was shared between Bethune–Cookman and North Carolina Central) | Rod Broadway | MEAC | 9–2–0 | 7–1–0 |
| 2017 | Rod Broadway | MEAC | 12–0–0 | 8–0–0 |
| Total conference championships | | | 14 | |

=== Men's basketball ===
The Aggie men's basketball program is coached by Monté Ross. Ross became the 12th head coach in the program's history, ahead of the 2023-2024 Season. The most notable coaches in Aggie history are Don Corbett and Cal Irvin, which the Aggie's home basketball court is named after (the Ellis F. Corbett Sports Center). Corbett is most known for leading the Aggies to seven straight MEAC Men's Basketball Tournament titles from 1982 to 1988. Corbett is also known for his 37-game home winning streak that lasted from January 18, 1986, to November 30, 1988. Irwin's legacy stems from his 18-season run as the Aggies basketball coach. During his tenure, the Aggies never finished below .500. Irvin's success carried the Aggies over from the Central Intercollegiate Athletic Association (CIAA) into the MEAC, where he won the school's first league championship in 1972. Irvin's held a 308–105 record as coach of the Aggies. His first CIAA championship came in 1958. Irvin's teams won CIAA titles in 1959,1962, 1964, and 1967.

The Aggies have appeared in the NCAA tournament ten times (1982, 1983, 1984, 1985, 1986, 1987, 1988, 1994, 1995, and 2013). The Aggies have also appeared in the National Invitation Tournament twice (1976 and 1981). The Aggies play home basketball games at the Ellis F. Corbett Sports Center, which opened in 1978. Corbett Sports Center, known for its intense playing atmosphere and loyal fan base, was chosen by ESPN columnist Kyle Whelliston as one of his favorite arena atmospheres. Additionally, Corbett Sports Center was ranked the 14th best atmosphere in the nation in an espn.com fan poll. North Carolina A&T was the only historically black college or university (HBCU) in the poll, and in 2007 they had three games nationally televised on ESPNU.

In 2013, the Aggies made their tenth appearance in the NCAA Division I tournament and had their first win.

NC A&T Men's Basketball Championships
CIAA Championships: 1958, 1959, 1962, 1964, 1967

MEAC championships: 1972, 1973, 1976, 1976, 1978, 1979, 1982, 1983, 1984, 1985, 1986, 1987, 1988, 1994, 1995, 2013
NCAA Tournament Appearances: 1982, 1983, 1984, 1985, 1986, 1987, 1988, 1994, 1995, and 2013
NIT Tournament Appearances: 1976, 1981

=== Women's basketball ===
The “Lady Aggies” are led by coach Tarrell Robinson, who assumed the coaching position in 2012. The Lady Aggies are one of the top teams in the MEAC, staking claim to six MEAC regular season and two MEAC tournament championships. Under previous coach Patricia Cage-Bibbs, the lady aggies secured notable victories over Wake Forest University and Charlotte in the 2010 WNIT Tournament. those victories gave the program the distinction of being the first Division-I HBCU program to win two postseason games in an NCAA Division I tournament. The Lady Aggies post a 41–4 home court record and a 25 home court win streak that began during the 2007 season. Their most recent MEAC title was during the 2009 season. The Lady Aggies won the MEAC regular season championship in 2008, 2009, and 2010.

NC A&T women's basketball championships
MEAC championships: 1994, 2009, 2016

NCAA Tournament appearances: 1994, 2009, 2016
NIT Tournament appearances: 2010, 2014

=== Baseball ===
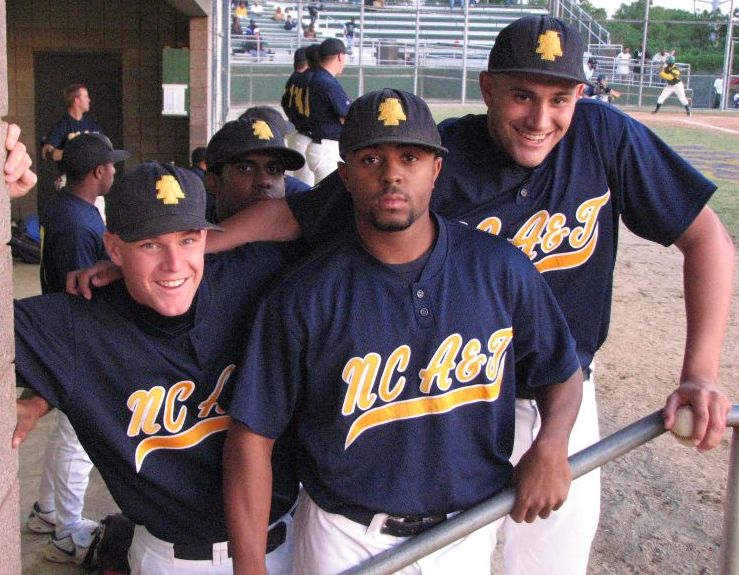
Aggies baseball players in the dugout during the 2007 MEAC baseball tournament

The North Carolina A&T baseball team is coached by Ben Hall. The Aggie Baseball program has claimed three MEAC championships and 14 Central Intercollegiate Athletic Association (CIAA) championships, including a six-season streak from 1950 to 1955. The Aggie baseball program plays all home contests in nearby War Memorial Stadium. The stadium has served as the home of various local minor league baseball clubs from the 1930s to 2004.

NC A&T Baseball Championships
MEAC championships: 1974, 1993, 2005

CIAA Championship: 1950, 1951, 1952, 1953, 1954, 1955, 1957, 1958, 1959, 1960, 1961, 1968, 1969, 1970

Source:NCAT Alumni Baseball Association

=== Bowling ===
The Lady Aggies bowling team is coached by Kim Terrell-Kearney who took over the program in 2016. The Aggies hold the distinction of winning four out of the first five MEAC Bowling Championships since the sport was officially recognized as a varsity sport by the conference in the 1999–2000 season.

NC A&T Bowling Championships
MEAC championships: 2000, 2002, 2003, 2004, 2018, 2021, 2022

Source:NCAT Athletics

==== National championships ====
North Carolina A&T has won one national championship in the program's history. In 2015, the Aggies won the United States Bowling Congress's Intercollegiate Team Championship, in their first appearance, defeating Robert Morris.

| Year | Coach | Selector | Overall record | Conference record |
|---|---|---|---|---|
| 2015 | Kim Terrell-Kearney | United States Bowling Congress | 74–37 |
| National Championships | | | 1 |

=== Golf ===
The North Carolina A&T women's golf team is led by Coach Richard Watkins. Watkins was the first head coach in the program's history and coaches both the women's and men's teams. The women's program played their inaugural season in 2016 and the men's program began in the fall of 2017. A&T uses Bryan Park Golf Course as their home course. Bryan Park has served as the host course for the U.S. Amateur Public Links Championship in 2010. The Bermuda grass course was recently awarded the prestigious 4-star ranking in Golf Digest's Best Places to Play Guide.

The A&T men's golf program received considerable publicity in the 2021–22 season when former NBA player J. R. Smith, who had gone directly from high school to the NBA and thus had never attended college, enrolled at A&T and joined the team.

=== Softball ===
The Lady Aggies softball team is coached by interim head coach Shawn Hendrix. Hendrix assumed the head coaching position After the departure of former coach Diego Ibarra. The Lady Aggies play their home contests at the Aggie Softball Complex which was built in 2005.

=== Tennis ===
The North Carolina A&T men's and women's tennis teams are led by Coach Dejon Bivins. Bivins assumed the position of head coach in 2021, after serving as the interim coach. Bivins has served as an assistant coach for the programs since 2017. The Aggies host their home matches at the Aggie Tennis Center. The facility, built in 2003, possesses eight synthetic surface courts where the Aggies play five to six tennis matches per year.

=== Track and field & Cross Country ===
The North Carolina A&T men's and women's track and field and Cross Country teams are led by Coach and Olympian Allen Johnson. Johnson oversees all six of NC A&T's track and field programs, which include men's and women's cross country, men's and women's indoor track and field and men's and women's outdoor track and field.

The Aggies host their home track meets at Marcus T. Johnson Track at Truist Stadium. The track surface is Mondo Super X Performance track and features eight 48-inch lanes and wide turns. Belk Track has played host to many regional, national, and international events, such as International Friendship & Freedom Games, the Mid-Eastern Athletic Conference Outdoor Track and Field Championships, the NCAA Division I Track and Field Championships – East Regional, the New Balance Outdoor Nationals (formerly the Nike Outdoor Nationals), and the USATF National Junior Olympic Track & Field Championships.

=== Volleyball ===
The North Carolina A&T volleyball team is coached by Hal Clifton. Clifton is the ninth head coach in the program's history, and he replaced former coach Toni Conway, who took over the program in 2009. Prior to joining NC A&T, Clifton held previous assistant coaching positions at NCAA Division II St. Andrews Presbyterian College, as well as six seasons at Division I Elon University. Clifton played an integral part in turning the Phoenix program from a 9–23 team, in the 2005 season, into a squad that finished in first place in the Southern Conference North Division in 2010 with a 21–14 overall record and an 11–5 mark in the league.

The Lady Aggies volleyball program currently hosts all home contests inside Moore Gymnasium.

== Former sports ==
=== Swimming ===
NC A&T sponsored Women's swimming as a varsity sport from 1998 to 2016 where they competed in the Coastal Collegiate Sports Association (CCSA), an NCAA Division I conference that started in 2007 as the single-sport Coastal Collegiate Swimming Association and adopted its current name when it added women's beach volleyball in 2015. The team was led by coach Shawn Hendrix, who ran the program from its first season.

== Facilities ==
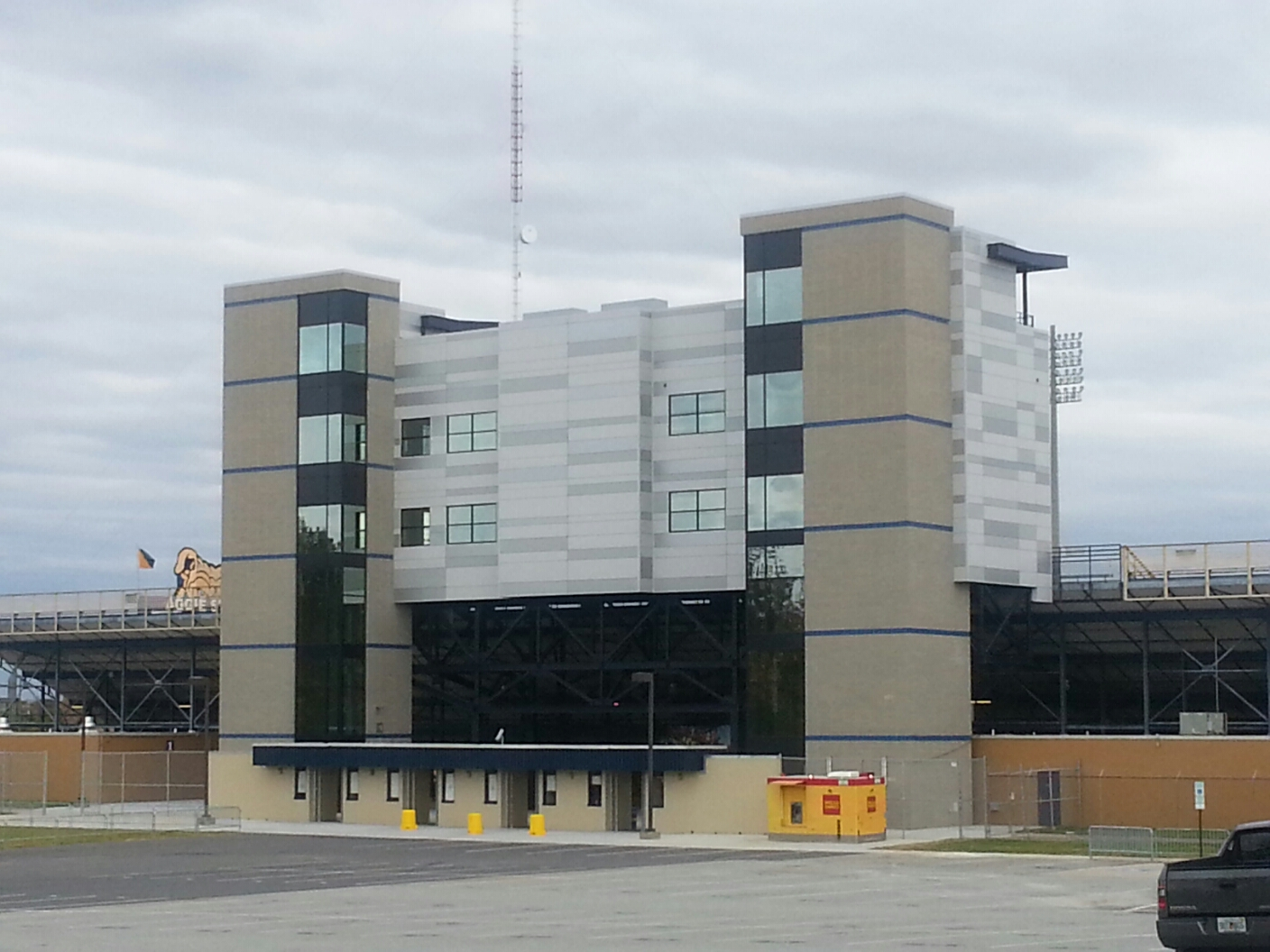
Truist Stadium

Corbett Sports Center

| Facility | Sport(s) | Capacity |
|---|---|---|
| Truist Stadium | Football | 21,500 |
| Aggie Tennis Complex | Tennis | – |
| Ellis F. Corbett Sports Center | Basketball, Swimming | 6,700 |
| Gate City Lanes‡ | Bowling | – |
| Irwin Belk Track | Track and Field | 21,500 |
| Lady Aggie Softball Complex | Softball | – |
| Moore Gymnasium | Volleyball | 1,200 |
| War Memorial Stadium | Baseball | 7,500 |

‡ Denotes off-campus facility

== Traditions ==
=== The Legend of the Aggie Bulldog ===
Aggie, sometimes referred to as the "Aggie Dawg" or "Aggie Dog", is the official mascot of A&T's athletic teams. Aggie and his female counterpart, Aggietha can be seen at football, men's and women's basketball games, and other university events. Although the physical representation of the athletic teams is a bulldog, the term "Aggie" has a historical connection to the university's agricultural roots as a land-grant university.

According to Albert W. Spruill, the origin of the school's Bulldog mascot stems from a tale of a shepherd dog, that was kept on the A&T farm to assist in herding the animals to shelter. During a football game the Aggies had become despondent and in the game's last few minutes, an A&T fullback broke through the opposition's defense and scored a touchdown that was ruled no good by a referee. It is said that at that moment, an unidentified person untied the bulldog which then attacked the referee. The incident was said to almost cost the school its membership in the CIAA, but it vindicated the Aggies. It is said that from that day on, the mascot for the football team has been a bulldog.

=== Dear A&T ===
"Dear A&T" is the alma mater of North Carolina A&T. The song traditionally concludes formal university events, including athletic contests such as football and basketball games attended by the North Carolina A&T State University Blue and Gold Marching Machine or the A&T pep band. It is more formal than the traditional fight songs such as "Old Aggie Spirit" and the "A&T Fight Song", and is typically played and sung in a more reverent fashion than other university songs.

=== North Carolina A&T fight song ===
The A&T fight song made its debut in 2005. The song is traditionally performed at athletic contests such as football and basketball games attended by the North Carolina A&T State University Blue and Gold Marching Machine or the A&T pep band. It is standard practice for the marching band to perform the song after an Aggie touchdown.

=== Old Aggie Spirit ===
"Old Aggie Spirit" is a popular song sung by fans and played by the band at many A&T athletic events, especially at football and basketball games. Before the creation of the school's fight song in 2005, the song served as the de facto fight song for the university's sports teams. It is standard practice for the marching band or pep band to perform the song during the pre game show at football games, after a touchdown, in lieu of the school's fight song, or during time-outs at basketball games. The melody of the song is based on the gospel music song "Old-Time Religion."
