= Aggie (mascot) =

Mascot of North Carolina Agricultural and Technical State University

- University: North Carolina Agricultural & Technical State University
- Conference: MEAC
- Origin of name: Diminutive form of the word Agricultural used to describe students of Agricultural colleges
- First seen: Fall 1984
- Related mascot(s): Agatha

Aggie, sometimes referred to as the Aggie Dawg or Aggie Dog, is the official mascot of North Carolina Agricultural and Technical State University, a historically black college in Greensboro, North Carolina, United States. Aggie can be seen representing the North Carolina A&T athletic teams on the sideline of football games at Aggie Stadium and at Corbett Sports Center during basketball games. Although the physical representation of the athletic teams is a bulldog, the term "Aggie" has a historical connection to the university's agricultural roots as a land grant university.

== History ==
The earliest known mascot at A&T dates back to the late 1970s. While live bulldog mascots were used on and off for the next several years, it was decided that an anthropomorphized version, as the one on the university logos at the time, would be a better fit. Over the years the face of Aggie has changed, but the basic concept of a clothed two-legged bulldog remained the same. There have been 12 official Aggie dogs in the school's history, with the first making his appearance in the fall of 1984.

=== The legend of the Aggie Bulldog ===
The term Aggie is a diminutive form of agricultural, which has long been used to refer to students who attend agricultural schools. Upon its founding as a land grant university in 1891, the school, then the Agricultural and Mechanical School for the Colored Race, adopted the nickname. According to oral history, the origin of the Aggie Bulldog mascot stems from a tale of a shepherd dog, a bulldog, that was kept on the college's farm to assist in herding the cattle and other animals into shelter. During a football game the Aggies had become despondent. In the last few minutes of the game, an Aggie fullback broke through the opposition's defense and scored a touchdown, but was deemed no good by a referee. It is said that at that moment, an unidentified person untied the bulldog which then attacked the referee. The incident was said to almost cost the school its membership in the CIAA, but it vindicated the Aggies. It is said that from that day on, the mascot for the football team has been a bulldog.

== Function of Aggie ==
Aggie makes appearances at all, A&T football and home men's basketball games. In addition, he appears at select home women's basketball, baseball games and home bowling meets. Aggie can be seen as well at tournaments such as the Mid-Eastern Athletic Conference basketball tourney and the NCAA. At athletic events, Aggie interacts with the fans to build excitement and help cheer A&T teams to victory. Besides athletic events, Aggie also appears at social events for both the university and Greater Greensboro community. Aggie is a prominent figure during Homecoming Week as he can be seen at pep rallies, participating in the homecoming parade and even appearing on television to boost community awareness of the festivities. Aggie also makes public appearances in the annual Greensboro Holiday parade and grand opening events for companies in the Greensboro area by request.

== Aggietha ==
Agatha or Aggietha Dawg is related to Aggie, which the team are called the "Lady Aggies", she belongs to North Carolina A&T State University in Greensboro, North Carolina, North Carolina sports for women.
