= Detrez =

Detrez is a surname. Notable people with the surname include:

- Conrad Detrez (1937–1985), Belgian writer
- Raymond Detrez (born 1948), Belgian academic and writer
- Detrez Newsome (born 1994), American football player
