= 2015 Alabama A&M Bulldogs football team =

American college football season

2015 Alabama A&M Bulldogs football
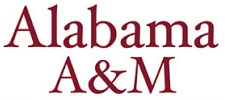
- Conference: Southwestern Athletic Conference
- East Division
- Record: 3–8 (3–6 SWAC)
- Head coach: James Spady (2nd season)
- Offensive coordinator: Phil Dorn (2nd season)
- Defensive coordinator: Reggie Johnson (2nd season)
- Home stadium: Louis Crews Stadium

2015 Southwestern Athletic Conference football standings
	Conf.			Overall
Team	W		L	W		L
East Division
Alcorn State xy$	7	–	2	9	–	4
Alabama State *	5	–	4	6	–	5
Alabama A&M	3	–	6	3	–	8
Jackson State	3	–	6	3	–	8
Mississippi Valley State	1	–	8	1	–	10
West Division
No. 24 Grambling State xy	9	–	0	9	–	3
Prairie View A&M	8	–	1	8	–	2
Southern	6	–	3	6	–	5
Texas Southern	2	–	7	3	–	7
Arkansas–Pine Bluff	1	–	8	2	–	9
Championship: Alcorn State 49, Grambling State 21
$ – Conference champion; x – Division champion/co-champions; y – Championship game participant; * – Ineligible for postseason due to APR violations; Rankings from STATS Poll

The 2015 Alabama A&M Bulldogs football team represented Alabama Agricultural and Mechanical University (Alabama A&M) in the 2015 NCAA Division I FCS football season. The Bulldogs were led by second-year head coach James Spady and played their home games at Louis Crews Stadium. They were a member of the East Division of the Southwestern Athletic Conference. They finished the season 3–8, 3–6 in SWAC play to finish in a tie for third place in the East Division.

== Schedule ==
Date	Time	Opponent	Site	TV	Result	Attendance
September 5	6:00 pm	at Cincinnati*	Nippert Stadium; Cincinnati, OH	ESPN3	L 10–52	39,095
September 19	6:00 pm	at Prairie View A&M	Waller ISD Football Stadium; Waller, TX	YouTube	L 49–53	5,042
September 26	1:00 pm	Arkansas–Pine Bluff^{†}	Louis Crews Stadium; Huntsville, AL (Lewis Crews Classic)		W 28–9	13,674
October 3	5:00 pm	at No. 2 Coastal Carolina*	Brooks Stadium; Conway, SC		L 0–55	9,093
October 10	3:00 pm	at Grambling State	Eddie Robinson Stadium; Grambling, LA		L 14–37	N/A
October 17	1:00 pm	Jackson State	Louis Crews Stadium; Huntsville, AL		W 28–22	10,019
October 31	2:30 pm	vs. Alabama State	Legion Field; Birmingham, AL (Magic City Classic)	ESPN3	L 20–35	63,874
November 7	1:00 pm	Mississippi Valley State	Louis Crews Stadium; Huntsville, AL		L 24–27 ^{OT}	2,478
November 14	4:00 pm	at Southern	Ace W. Mumford Stadium; Baton Rouge, LA	CST	L 7–46	11,821
November 21	2:00 pm	at Alcorn State	Casem-Spinks Stadium; Lorman, MS		L 10–44	2,194
November 28	1:00 pm	Texas Southern	Louis Crews Stadium; Huntsville, AL		W 38–7	1,200
*Non-conference game; ^{†}Homecoming; Rankings from STATS FCS Poll released prior to game Poll released prior to the game; All times are in Central time

- Source: Schedule
