= Earl Wolff =

American football player (born 1989)

No. 28
- Position: Safety

Personal information
- Born: December 15, 1989 (age 36); Fort Bragg, North Carolina, U.S.
- Listed height: 5 ft 11 in (1.80 m)
- Listed weight: 209 lb (95 kg)

Career information
- High school: Hoke County (Raeford, North Carolina)
- College: NC State (2009–2012)
- NFL draft: 2013: 5th round, 136th overall pick

Career history
- Philadelphia Eagles (2013–2014); Jacksonville Jaguars (2015–2016)*; Washington Redskins (2017)*; Indianapolis Colts (2017)*
- * Offseason or practice squad member only

Awards and highlights
- First-team All-ACC (2012)

Career NFL statistics
- Total tackles: 52
- Pass deflections: 6
- Interceptions: 1
- Stats at Pro Football Reference

Earl Wolff IV (born December 15, 1989) is an American former professional football player who was a safety in the National Football League (NFL). He played college football for the North Carolina State Wolfpack. He was selected by the Philadelphia Eagles in the fifth round of the 2013 NFL draft.

== Early life ==
Wolff was born in Fayetteville, North Carolina. He attended Hoke County High School in Raeford, where he played running back and safety for the Hoke County Fighting Bucks high school football team. He rushed 135 times for 997 yards and nine touchdowns as a senior, and also recorded 89 tackles, 12 tackles for loss, five interceptions, one sack and seven forced fumbles on defense. He was named all-conference as a running back and all-region as a safety, and also earned all-conference honors after his junior season as a safety. He was an all-conference performer in track since his ninth grade year, including finishing fifth in the state in the long jump and triple jump in the tenth grade.

== College career ==
Wolff attended North Carolina State University, where he played for the NC State Wolfpack football team from 2008 to 2012. After redshirting in 2008, he started four games in 2009 at the boundary safety position, he ended the season ranked 10th on the squad with 51 tackles. In 2010, he ranked first on the team in tackles with 95, and recorded his first career interception in a win against Central Florida, and also forced three fumbles. In 2011, he was named a conference honorable mention after recording 105 tackles (59 solo), three interceptions and three pass break-ups. In 2012, he recorded 119 tackles (75 solo), seven pass break ups, nine pass deflections, two interceptions and a forced fumble, which earned himself first-team all-conference honors. He finished his career with 400 career tackles, 7 interceptions, and 9 forced fumbles.

== Professional career ==
=== Philadelphia Eagles ===
He was selected by the Philadelphia Eagles in the fifth round, with the 136th overall pick, of the 2013 NFL draft.

After injuring his knee in a game against the Green Bay Packers, Wolff practiced for the first time before the Week 15 contest against the Minnesota Vikings. However, Wolff did not play in the game against the Vikings. Wolff was placed on injured reserve on November 18, 2014.

He was injury waived on August 21, 2015.

=== Jacksonville Jaguars ===
Wolff was signed to the practice squad by the Jacksonville Jaguars on December 22, 2015.

On January 4, 2016, he signed a futures contract with the Jaguars. He was waived/injured by the Jaguars on August 29, 2016 and was placed on injured reserve. On September 7, 2016, Wolff was released from the Jaguars' injured reserve with an injury settlement.

=== Washington Redskins ===
On January 5, 2017, Wolff signed a futures contract with the Washington Redskins. On August 3, 2017, Wolff was released by the Redskins.

=== Indianapolis Colts ===
On August 28, 2017, Wolff signed with the Indianapolis Colts. He was placed on injured reserve on September 2, 2017. He was released on September 8, 2017.

== Personal life ==
Wolff was robbed and kidnapped at gunpoint in the early morning of February 23, 2016. He was taken in his own car, and released after a short captivity in Fayetteville. Police reported that Bobby DeShawn Bailey had been arrested in the case and charged with robbery with a dangerous weapon, first-degree kidnapping, conspiracy, larceny, possession of a stolen motor vehicle, and possession of marijuana.
