= 2015 Alabama State Hornets football team =

American college football season

2015 Alabama State Hornets football
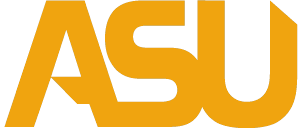
- Conference: Southwestern Athletic Conference
- East Division
- Record: 6–5 (5–4 SWAC)
- Head coach: Brian Jenkins (1st season)
- Offensive coordinator: Mark Orlando (1st season)
- Co-defensive coordinators: Lou West (1st season); Ted Daisher (1st season)
- Home stadium: New ASU Stadium

2015 Southwestern Athletic Conference football standings
	Conf.			Overall
Team	W		L	W		L
East Division
Alcorn State xy$	7	–	2	9	–	4
Alabama State *	5	–	4	6	–	5
Alabama A&M	3	–	6	3	–	8
Jackson State	3	–	6	3	–	8
Mississippi Valley State	1	–	8	1	–	10
West Division
No. 24 Grambling State xy	9	–	0	9	–	3
Prairie View A&M	8	–	1	8	–	2
Southern	6	–	3	6	–	5
Texas Southern	2	–	7	3	–	7
Arkansas–Pine Bluff	1	–	8	2	–	9
Championship: Alcorn State 49, Grambling State 21
$ – Conference champion; x – Division champion/co-champions; y – Championship game participant; * – Ineligible for postseason due to APR violations; Rankings from STATS Poll

The 2015 Alabama State Hornets football team represented Alabama State University as a member of the East Division of the Southwestern Athletic Conference (SWAC) during 2015 NCAA Division I FCS football season. Led by first-year head coach Brian Jenkins, the Hornets compiled an overall record of 6–5 with a mark of 5–4 in conference play, placing second in the SWAC East Division. Alabama State played home games at New ASU Stadium in Montgomery, Alabama.

== Schedule ==
Date	Time	Opponent	Site	TV	Result	Attendance
September 6	6:00 pm	at Tennessee State*	Nissan Stadium; Nashville, TN	OVCDN	L 14–24	20,055
September 12	6:00 pm	Alcorn State	New ASU Stadium; Montgomery, AL		L 14–31	8,380
September 19	6:00 pm	Grambling State	New ASU Stadium; Montgomery, AL (Prince Hall Masons Americanism Football Classic)		L 10–34	10,277
September 26	6:00 pm	at Mississippi Valley State	Rice–Totten Field; Itta Bena, MS		W 45–15	4,026
October 1	6:30 pm	at Texas Southern	BBVA Compass Stadium; Houston, TX	ESPNU	W 41–23	2,827
October 10	6:00 pm	Southern	New ASU Stadium; Montgomery, AL		L 34–45	11,580
October 15	6:30 pm	at Arkansas–Pine Bluff	Golden Lion Stadium; Pine Bluff, AR	ESPNU	W 31–24	3,783
October 31	2:30 pm	vs. Alabama A&M	Legion Field; Birmingham, AL (Magic City Classic)	ESPN3	W 35–20	63,874
November 7	6:00 pm	at Jackson State	Mississippi Veterans Memorial Stadium; Jackson, MS		W 17–12	1,649
November 14	2:00 pm	Prairie View A&M	New ASU Stadium; Montgomery, AL		L 13–38	6,011
November 21	2:00 pm	Miles*^{†}	New ASU Stadium; Montgomery, AL		W 26–7	15,201
*Non-conference game; ^{†}Homecoming; All times are in Central time
