= 2015 Southern Jaguars football team =

American college football season

2015 Southern Jaguars football
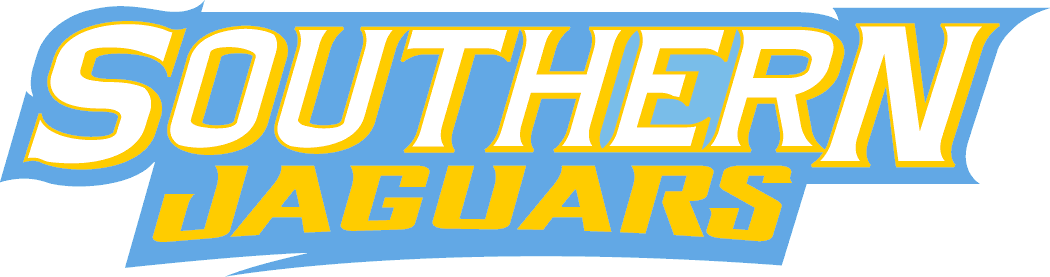
- Conference: Southwestern Athletic Conference
- West Division
- Record: 6–5 (6–3 SWAC)
- Head coach: Dawson Odums (3rd season)
- Co-offensive coordinators: Chennis Berry (3rd season); Chad Germany (4th season)
- Home stadium: Ace W. Mumford Stadium

2015 Southwestern Athletic Conference football standings
	Conf.			Overall
Team	W		L	W		L
East Division
Alcorn State xy$	7	–	2	9	–	4
Alabama State *	5	–	4	6	–	5
Alabama A&M	3	–	6	3	–	8
Jackson State	3	–	6	3	–	8
Mississippi Valley State	1	–	8	1	–	10
West Division
No. 24 Grambling State xy	9	–	0	9	–	3
Prairie View A&M	8	–	1	8	–	2
Southern	6	–	3	6	–	5
Texas Southern	2	–	7	3	–	7
Arkansas–Pine Bluff	1	–	8	2	–	9
Championship: Alcorn State 49, Grambling State 21
$ – Conference champion; x – Division champion/co-champions; y – Championship game participant; * – Ineligible for postseason due to APR violations; Rankings from STATS Poll

The 2015 Southern Jaguars football team represented Southern University in the 2015 NCAA Division I FCS football season. The Jaguars were led by third-year head coach Dawson Odums. The Jaguars played their home games at Ace W. Mumford Stadium and were a member of the West Division of the Southwestern Athletic Conference (SWAC). They finished the season 6–5, 6–3 in SWAC play to finish in third place in the West Division.

== Schedule ==
Date	Time	Opponent	Site	TV	Result	Attendance
September 5	6:00 pm	at Louisiana Tech*	Joe Aillet Stadium; Ruston, LA	ASN	L 15–62	27,905
September 10	6:30 pm	at Mississippi Valley State	Rice–Totten Field; Itta Bena, MS	ESPNU	W 50–13	2,348
September 19	6:30 pm	Jackson State	Ace W. Mumford Stadium; Baton Rouge, LA (rivalry)	ESPN3	W 50–31	30,194
September 26	11:00 am	at No. 7 (FBS) Georgia*	Sanford Stadium; Athens, GA	SEC	L 6–48	92,746
October 10	6:00 pm	at Alabama State	New ASU Stadium; Montgomery, AL		W 45–34	11,580
October 17	4:00 pm	Prairie View A&M^{†}	Ace W. Mumford Stadium; Baton Rouge, LA	CST	L 42–47	20,467
October 24	2:00 pm	at Texas Southern	BBVA Compass Stadium; Houston, TX	RTSW	W 40–21	10,127
October 31	4:00 pm	Alcorn State	Ace W. Mumford Stadium; Baton Rouge, LA	CST	L 7–48	8,112
November 7	2:30 pm	at Arkansas–Pine Bluff	Golden Lion Stadium; Pine Bluff, AR	UAPBtv	W 57–24	3,464
November 14	4:00 pm	Alabama A&M	Ace W. Mumford Stadium; Baton Rouge, LA	CST	W 46–7	11,821
November 28	4:00 pm	vs. No. 21 Grambling State	Mercedes-Benz Superdome; New Orleans, LA (Bayou Classic)	NBCSN	L 23–34	62,507
*Non-conference game; ^{†}Homecoming; Rankings from STATS Poll released prior to the game; All times are in Central time
