= 2015 Grambling State Tigers football team =

American college football season

2015 Grambling State Tigers football

SWAC West Division champion

SWAC Championship Game, L 21–49 vs. Alcorn State
- Conference: Southwestern Athletic Conference
- West Division

Ranking
- STATS: No. 24
- Record: 9–3 (9–0 SWAC)
- Head coach: Broderick Fobbs (2nd season)
- Offensive coordinator: Eric Dooley (2nd season)
- Defensive coordinator: Everett Todd (2nd season)
- Home stadium: Eddie Robinson Stadium

2015 Southwestern Athletic Conference football standings
	Conf.			Overall
Team	W		L	W		L
East Division
Alcorn State xy$	7	–	2	9	–	4
Alabama State *	5	–	4	6	–	5
Alabama A&M	3	–	6	3	–	8
Jackson State	3	–	6	3	–	8
Mississippi Valley State	1	–	8	1	–	10
West Division
No. 24 Grambling State xy	9	–	0	9	–	3
Prairie View A&M	8	–	1	8	–	2
Southern	6	–	3	6	–	5
Texas Southern	2	–	7	3	–	7
Arkansas–Pine Bluff	1	–	8	2	–	9
Championship: Alcorn State 49, Grambling State 21
$ – Conference champion; x – Division champion/co-champions; y – Championship game participant; * – Ineligible for postseason due to APR violations; Rankings from STATS Poll

The 2015 Grambling State Tigers football team represented Grambling State University in the 2015 NCAA Division I FCS football season. The Tigers were led by second-year head coach Broderick Fobbs. They competed as a member of the West Division of the Southwestern Athletic Conference (SWAC) and played their home games at Eddie Robinson Stadium in Grambling, Louisiana. They finished the season 9–3, 9–0 in SWAC play to be champions of the West Division. They represented the West Division in the SWAC Championship Game where they lost to Alcorn State.

== Schedule ==
Date	Time	Opponent	Rank	Site	TV	Result	Attendance	Source
September 5	4:00 pm	at California*		California Memorial Stadium; Berkeley, CA	P12N	L 14–73	60,606	
September 12	4:00 pm	Bethune–Cookman*		Eddie Robinson Stadium; Grambling, LA	PSB Live	L 53–56	12,019	
September 19	6:00 pm	at Alabama State		New ASU Stadium; Montgomery, AL		W 34–10	10,277	
September 26	6:00 pm	vs. Prairie View A&M		Cotton Bowl; Dallas, TX (State Fair Classic)	YouTube	W 70–54	51,328	
October 3	2:00 pm	at Jackson State		Mississippi Veterans Memorial Stadium; Jackson, MS	JSUtv	W 59–27	15,940	
October 10	3:00 pm	Alabama A&M		Eddie Robinson Stadium; Grambling, LA	PSB Live	W 37–14	N/A	
October 17	2:00 pm	at Alcorn State		Casem-Spinks Stadium; Lorman, MS		W 35–34 ^{OT}	30,129	
October 24	2:00 pm	Mississippi Valley State^{†}		Eddie Robinson Stadium; Grambling, LA		W 49–14	10,536	
November 7	2:00 pm	vs. Texas Southern		Independence Stadium; Shreveport, LA (Red River State Fair Classic)		W 41–15	9,868	
November 14	2:30 pm	at Arkansas–Pine Bluff		Golden Lion Stadium; Pine Bluff, AR		W 49–31	11,437	
November 28	4:00 pm	vs. Southern	No. 21	Mercedes-Benz Superdome; New Orleans, LA (Bayou Classic)	NBCSN	W 34–23	62,507	
December 5	3:00 pm	vs. Alcorn State	No. 21	NRG Stadium; Houston, TX (SWAC Championship Game)	ESPNU	L 21–49	40,352	
*Non-conference game; ^{†}Homecoming; Rankings from STATS Poll released prior to the game; All times are in Central time

== Ranking movements ==
Ranking movements Legend: ██ Increase in ranking ██ Decrease in ranking — = Not ranked RV = Received votes
	Week													
Poll	Pre	1	2	3	4	5	6	7	8	9	10	11	12	Final
STATS FCS	RV	—	—	—	—	—	RV	RV	RV	RV	25	22	21	24
Coaches	—	—	—	—	—	—	—	RV	RV	RV	RV	RV	24	RV
