= North Carolina A&T Aggies football =

Football program

2026 North Carolina A&T Aggies football team
- First season: 1901; 125 years ago
- Athletic director: Earl Hilton
- Head coach: Shawn Gibbs; 1st season, 2–10 (.167)
- Location: Greensboro, North Carolina
- Stadium: Truist Stadium (capacity: 21,500)
- NCAA division: Division I FCS
- Conference: CAA Football
- Colors: Blue and gold
- All-time record: 532–452–40 (.539)
- Bowl record: 7–4 (.636)

Black college national championships
- 1951, 1968, 1990, 1999, 2015, 2017, 2018, 2019

Conference championships
- CIAA: 1927, 1950, 1958, 1959, 1964 MEAC: 1975, 1986, 1991, 1992, 1999, 2003, 2014, 2015, 2017, 2018, 2019
- Consensus All-Americans: 39
- Rivalries: North Carolina Central (rivalry); South Carolina State (rivalry)
- Fight song: "Aggie Fight Song" "Old Aggie Spirit"
- Mascot: Aggies
- Website: ncataggies.com

The North Carolina A&T Aggies football program represents North Carolina A&T State University in college football. The Aggies play in the NCAA Division I Football Championship Subdivision as a member of CAA Football, the technically separate football league operated by the Aggies' full-time home of the Coastal Athletic Association.

== History ==
=== Early history (1901–1924) ===
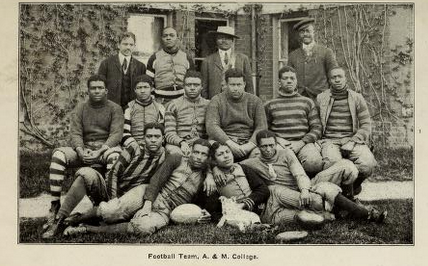
Picture of the 1907 North Carolina A&T State University Football Team

In 1901, the team played its first game, losing to Livingstone College. The team played only one game during the 1901 season and did not field another team until 1906. In the program's early years, the team would sporadically field teams, having periods between 1907 and 1911; 1913; and 1917 where there was no team. Due to the outbreak of World War I, the school did not field a team, but resumed play once again in 1919 competing against neighboring Bennett College. It wasn't until 1923, that A&T's first coach of record, L.P. Byarm, would come along to lead the team.

=== Byarm and Jefferson (1923–1932) ===
In 1924, North Carolina A&T joined the Central Intercollegiate Athletic Association (CIAA), an athletic conference mostly consisting of historically black colleges and universities (HBCU). The Aggies finished that season with a record of 4–1–4, with their only loss coming from a 7–10 loss to West Virginia State to close the season. In 1927, Byarm led A&T to its first undefeated season and the school's first conference championship in football. The Aggies finished the season with a record of 8–0. Byarm would continue to coach the Aggies until 1930. Over his 7-year career as coach, he compiled a record of 38–25–10.

In 1931 Harry R. Jefferson would inherit the team. Jefferson, would lead the Aggies for two seasons before leaving to coach at Hampton University in Virginia. In his two season with A&T, he compiled a record of 5–11.

=== Inman A. Breaux era (1933–1939) ===
In 1933, Inman A. Breaux became the head coach of the Aggies. In his first season, the team finished with a record of 3–3–3. The 1944 season would fare much better for the Aggies as the team compiled a record of 7–1; with their sole loss coming from a 7–0 loss to Morgan State. In his six seasons with the Aggies, Breaux compiled a record of 28–17–8.

=== Four coaches era (1940–1945) ===
From 1940 to 1945, the Aggies had a revolving door of coaching changes as the team had four different head coaches, Homer Harris, Roland Bernard, Charles DeBerry, and Charles Carter within a five-year span. Of the coaches during this time period, DeBerry was the only man to lead the team for more than one season. In 1943 DeBerry led the Aggies to their second undefeated season in the team's history. That season, the Aggies would compete in their first post-season bowl game, as the team defeated Southern, 14–12, in the Flower Bowl. Over the three seasons DeBerry led the Aggies, he compiled a record of 13–12–1.

=== Bell and Piggot (1946–1968) ===
The 1946 season would bring about some stability for the Aggies as new coach William "Bill" Bell became head coach. In his first season as coach, Bell had a record of 5–5. In 1950, Bell would lead the team to their second CIAA championship. Team Quarterback, Robert "Stonewall" Jackson, along with running back James Fisher and Helburn "Bud" Meadows would clinch the CIAA championship by beating the nationally ranked North Carolina College 25–13 in the season closer.

Bell would lead the Aggies for 11 seasons until the arrival of new coach Bert C. Piggott in 1957. Like Bell, Piggott would also be a consistent figure for the program. Between 1958 & 1959, Aggie Quarterback Paul Swann threw for a total 1,573 yards and 12 touchdowns, helping the Aggies win back to back CIAA championships. In 1964, the Aggies claimed their fifth CIAA championship. The team would go 6–0–1 in the conference to clinch the title, including a 26–0 shutout of rival North Carolina College in the season finale. Of those on the 1964 Aggie championship roster was future Pro Football Hall of Fame Inductee Elvin Bethea. Over the 11 years he led the team, Piggott would win a total of 3 CIAA championships, and 8 straight winning seasons; a feat unmatched by any other coach in school history.

=== Howell, McKinley, and Forte (1968–1988) ===
The 1968 season saw Hornsby Howell becoming the new coach of the team. In his first year as coach, the Aggies would go 8–1, with their sole loss at the hands of University of Maryland Eastern Shore. That year, the Aggies would be named Black college football national co-champions, earning their first national title. Howell would lead the Aggies through their remaining years in the CIAA, and their eventual move to the Mid-Eastern Athletic Conference. In 1970, A&T would leave the CIAA to form a new conference with the intent of transitioning to the NCAA's Division I. Along with Delaware State University, Howard University, University of Maryland Eastern Shore, Morgan State University, North Carolina Central University and South Carolina State University, the Mid-Eastern Athletic Conference (MEAC) was created. In 1975, the Aggies would win their first football championship in the MEAC. During that season, Quarterback Ellsworth Turner completed 55% of his passes while throwing a total of 1,349 yards to help the Aggies capture the conference title. Over Howell's 9-year career with A&T, he would win 62% of the games he coach, and would earn a career record of 55–34–4.

In 1977 James "Jim" McKinley would become head coach of the A&T football program. McKinley would take the helm of the Aggies after leaving his first head coaching position at Central State University in Ohio. During his 5-year career at North Carolina A&T, His record was a total 29 wins, 32 losses and 1 tie with a highlight 9 wins and 3 losses for the 1980 season. McKinley would leave A&T in 1981 to coach at Prairie View A&M Panthers football in Texas.

Maurice "Mo" Forte would become the team's next head coach in 1982. Four years later, the Aggies would win their second MEAC championship. That season, standout Quarterback Alan Hooker and Wide receiver Herbert Harbison were key components to the team's championship run. Harbison's 63 catches and 883 receiving yards would set a school record, that to this day still stands. Forte's record with the Aggies would end at 26 wins, 38 losses, and 1 tie.

=== Bill Hayes era (1988–2002) ===
In 1988, William "Bill" Hayes would take the helm of the Aggie program. In 1990, the Aggies would maintain a 9–2 record and be crown the 1990 Black college football National Champions. The following season, the Aggie's infamous defensive line, known as the "Blue Death Defense" would be a driving force in the team successful MEAC championship campaign. The team would gain an end their season in a 13–36 losing effort to Alabama State in the now defunct Heritage Bowl. The 1992 season would prove to be another successful one for the Aggies. The team would again capture the MEAC conference championship, with a 9–3 record, and advance to the NCAA Division IAA playoffs, where they lost to The Citadel. The 1999 Aggie team is arguably the most dominant team in the program's history. That season, the Aggies went undefeated against all MEAC opponents for the first, and only, time in the program's history. The team also set a school record for most wins in a single season with 11 total and defeated number 1 ranked Tennessee State to earn the school's first NCAA playoff victory. That year, the Aggies were also awarded their third Black College National Championship. Over his 15 seasons with the Aggies, Hayes would compile a record of 106 wins, making him the all-time leading coach in school history.

=== Small, Fobbs and Lee (2003–2008) ===
In 2003, George Small was named head coach of the Aggies. That same season, the team won their sixth MEAC championship and earned a berth in the NCAA Division IAA playoffs, where they lost to Wofford in the first round. The following two seasons, the Aggies would go 3–8 and Small would have end his career at A&T with a record of 16 wins and 19 losses.

In 2006, Lee Fobbs Jr. became the 16th coach of the Aggie program. Fobbs tenure was marked with failures as the team would endure a 27-game losing streak over his first two years as head coach. The Aggies were ranked 114th out of 118 in the Football Championship Subdivision in total offense, 113th in passing offense and 107th in scoring offense. On August 30, 2008, the Aggies defeated Division II opponent Johnson C. Smith 44–12 in their season opener to break the losing streak. The following week, the Aggies would go on to defeat rival Winston-Salem State. Following those games, the Aggies resumed their losing trend as they lost the next six games, including a 28–27 loss to rival North Carolina Central, which is in the second year of its transition to Division I. Fobbs was relieved of his coaching duties on October 21, 2008, and the following week, the Aggies beat Howard 21–20. Running back coach George Ragsdale was named interim coach for the remainder of the 2008 season, where the team went 1–3.

In 2009, Alonzo Lee became the coach of the A&T football program. In his first season as head coach, the Aggies made a remarkable turnaround. The team, which finished the season with a record of 6–5, won more games in 2009 than they had won in their previous three seasons combined. The following season, with the effects of the Fobbs era behind them, the Aggies had a dismal 2010 campaign. The Aggies finished the 2010 season with a 1–10 record, with their sole win coming from a 52–32 win over Howard University. At the conclusion of the 2010 season, it was announced that Lee was released as Head football coach and that assistant coach George Ragsdale would once again serve as interim coach of the Aggies.

=== Rod Broadway era (2011–2018) ===
In February 2011, after media reports of him turning down the offer, Rod Broadway became the 18th coach of the Aggie football program. In his first season with the Aggies, the team finished with a 5–6 record, improving upon the previous season by 4 wins. The following season the team finished 7–4 with wins over rivals South Carolina State and North Carolina Central. The 2013 Season began with the program being cleared from the NCAA of any Academic Progress Rate (APR) penalties for the first time since 2008. The imposed sanction eliminated spring practice and reduced the number of scholarships that could be offered to players. That year, the Aggies finished with a record of 7–4; with an upset win over three-time FCS national champion Appalachian State, and a 28–0 win over rival North Carolina Central. The previous 2 seasons marked the first back-to-back winning seasons for the program since 2001. In Broadway's fourth season as head coach, the Aggies would finish the season with a 9–3 record and one of five teams tied for the MEAC Championship. that season, the Aggies would not get the conference automatic qualifying, or an at large bid, for the 2014 NCAA FCS Playoffs. In 2015, the Aggies won their 8th MEAC conference championship and was invited to the inaugural Celebration Bowl, which pitted the MEAC champion with the Champion of the Southwestern Athletic Conference (SWAC). In that game, the Aggies defeated the Alcorn State Braves 41–34, capturing their 4th Black College Football National Championship. In 2016, the Aggies earned their first win against a team from the NCAA Division I Football Bowl Subdivision (FBS) when they defeated the Kent State Golden Flashes in four Overtimes at Dix Stadium. The Aggies would finish the season 9–3, 7–1 in MEAC play to finish in second place, receiving an at-large bid to the FCS Playoffs where they lost in the first round to Richmond. The 2017 season would arguably be one of, if not the best, season in the program's history. The Aggies finished the season undefeated with a record of 12–0, 8–0 in MEAC play, capturing their ninth conference title. A&T also earned an invitation to the Celebration Bowl where they defeated Grambling State and earned their fifth black college football national championship. At the conclusion of the season, Rod Broadway announced his retirement finishing his A&T career with a seven-year record of 57–22.

=== Recent history ===
In 2018, former defensive coordinator Sam Washington was named head coach of the program. In his first season, the Aggies repeated as both MEAC and Celebration Bowl champions. The team finished the season with a 10–2 record, including their 2nd bowl victory over Alcorn State, earning their sixth black college football national championship. The following season, A&T would again, win the MEAC Championship and earn a celebration bowl invite. They finished the season with a 9–3 record, earning the program's 7th Black College Football National Championship. On February 7, 2020, A&T's board of trustees voted to leave the MEAC for the Big South Conference effective July 2021. However, A&T announced a year later that it would join the all-sports Coastal Athletic Association in July 2022, with football remaining in the Big South until joining the CAA's technically separate football league, CAA Football, in 2023.

== Home stadium ==
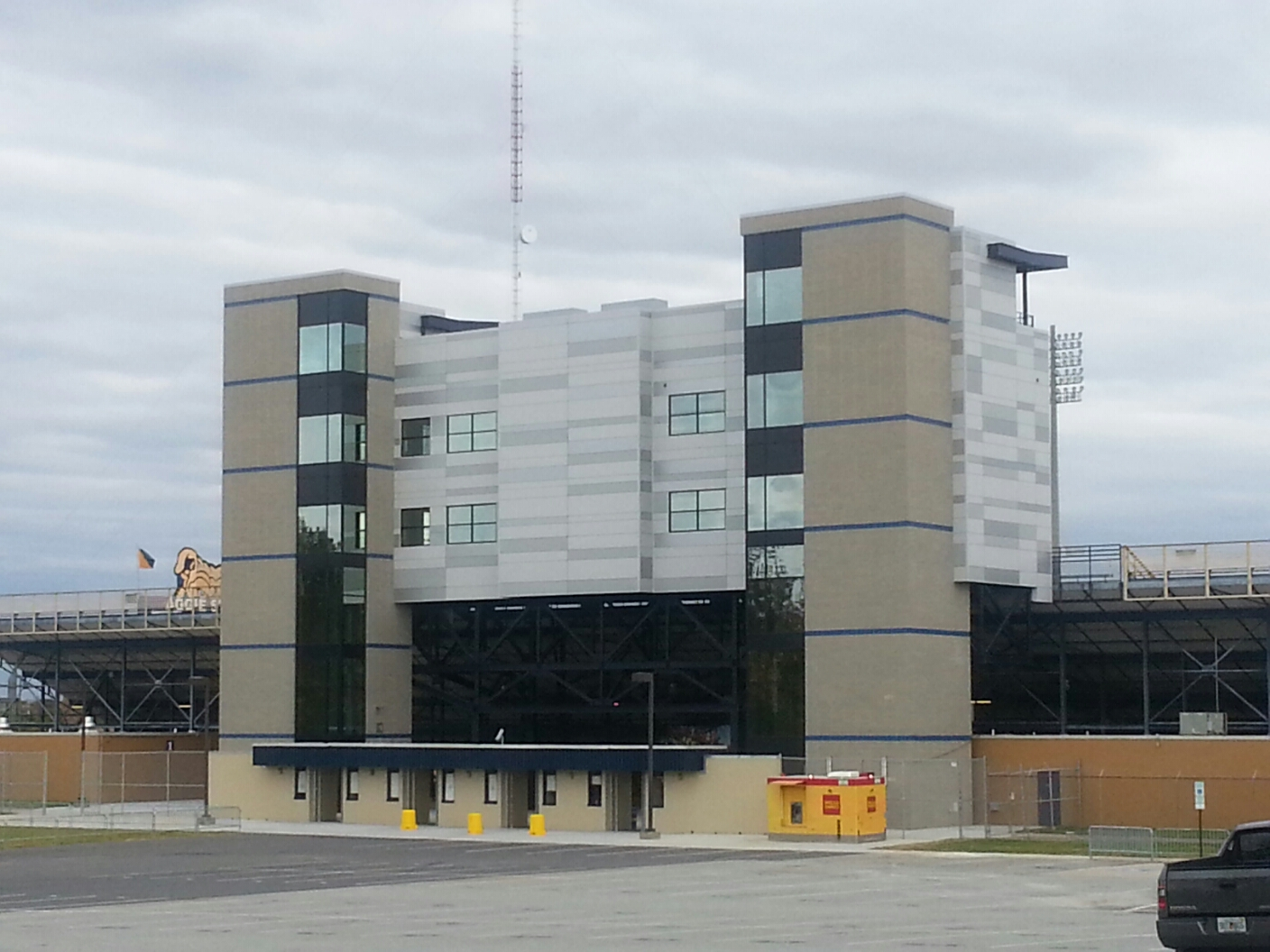
Truist Stadium, opened in 1981, is the present Home of North Carolina A&T Football.

The Aggies play home football games at Truist Stadium which opened in 1981. Before its construction, the Aggies played their home football games at Greensboro's War Memorial Stadium, which, at the time, was home to the nearby minor league baseball franchise. The university saw the need to have an on-campus stadium able to hold the growing number of fans attending home football games. The original stadium was designed by architect W. Edward Jenkins, a North Carolina A&T alumnus, and opened in 1981. The first game played there was on September 12, 1981, against local rival Winston Salem State University to an overflow crowd of more than 23,000 fans. To date, the largest single-game attendance at Truist Stadium was set in 2001 when 34,769 people were in attendance for a football game against the rattlers of Florida A&M University.

== Culture ==
A&T football has traditions that range from the long-standing, to new. The following are football traditions associated with the Aggie football program:

=== Marching band ===
The Aggie Football Team is supported by The North Carolina A&T State University Blue and Gold Marching Machine, the university's marching band. Started in 1918, it is one of the longest standing traditions of A&T football. The Blue and Gold Marching Machine perform the pre-game ceremonies, halftime, and post game for all A&T home football games, in addition to traveling to most away contests.

=== Mascot ===
"Aggie", sometimes referred to as the Aggie Dawg (or Aggie Dog), and his female counterpart "Aggietha" (pronounced Agatha) represent the Aggies as the official A&T mascots. The two can be seen on the sideline of football games at Aggie Stadium. Although, the physical representation of the athletic teams is a bulldog, the term "Aggie" has a historical connection to the university. The term "Aggie" has long been used to refer to students who attend agricultural schools. Hence the reason the university adopted the nickname "Aggies" when the school was founded in 1891.

=== Traditions ===
At the conclusion of all home games, and away games in which the marching band travels, the coaches, players, cheerleaders, and student section gather near the marching band to sing, the school song, Dear A&T. Another A&T football tradition is the Student section. The Aggie Livewires, have been the "official cheering section" of the Aggies since their inception in 1995. The Livewires are known for starting cheers, spreading spirit at athletic events, and their involvement on campus and the community at large. The student organization occupies section R in the West grandstand of Aggie Stadium, next to the band.

=== Rivalries ===
The Aggie's chief rival is its in-state, and former MEAC competitor, North Carolina Central University. North Carolina A&T also has a historic rivalry with Winston-Salem State University, and to a lesser degree with South Carolina State University.

==== North Carolina Central ====
Commonly referred to as the "Aggie–Eagle rivalry," this particular rivalry dates back to the first Aggie Football game in 1924; in which the game ended in a 13–13 tie. The intensity of the rivalry is driven by the proximity of the two schools, as both are only 55 miles apart via U.S. Interstate 85, the size of the two schools, as North Carolina A&T is the largest Historically Black College and University in the state with North Carolina Central being the second, and the fact that both schools are competing for many of the same students and athletes. Fans of both teams tend to place great emphasis on this rivalry and the intensity of it causes splits among many families, marriages, and other groups over their respective teams.

==== Winston-Salem State ====
The rivalry with Winston-Salem State is arguably, the second most important rival of the Aggies. The series dates back to 1952, and has roots in the CIAA, where both teams were at one time members. The rivalry is driven by the close proximity of the two schools, as both are approximately 30 miles apart via Interstate 40, coaching personnel and conference ties once shared by both schools. Since Winston-Salem State's decision to discontinue the transition to Division I citing financial reasons, this rivalry has been placed on hold for the foreseeable future.

==== South Carolina State ====
The rivalry with South Carolina State is the most civil of the Aggie's chief rivals. The series dates back to 1958, and is driven by Conference alignment and proximity within the region. Both North Carolina A&T and South Carolina State are members of the MEAC, and are the largest public Historically Black colleges representing their respective states. Athletically, South Carolina State spoiled the Aggie's 2003 undefeated conference record when they handed A&T their only MEAC loss of the season with a 49–9 win in the regular season closer. Currently, South Carolina State leads the series 32 wins to 14.

== Individual honors ==
=== Players ===
MEAC Players of The Year

Offense

- 1971 – Willie Wright (SE)
- 1975 – George Ragsdale (BR)
- 1976 – Ellsworth Turner (QB)
- 1986 – Alan Hooker (QB)
- 1990 – Connell Maynor (QB)
- 1991 – Connell Maynor (QB)
- 2001 – Maurice Hicks (RB)
- 2011 – Mike Mayhew (RB)
- 2014 – Tarik Cohen (RB)
- 2015 – Tarik Cohen (RB)
- 2016 - Tarik Cohen (RB)
- 2017 - Lamar Raynard (QB)

Defense

- 1971 – Ben Blacknall (LB)
- 1977 – Dwaine Board (DE)
- 1984 – Herbert Harbison (PR) & Earnest Riddick (DL)
- 1985 – Earnest Riddick (DL)
- 1988 – Demetrius Harrison (LB)
- 1989 – Demetrius Harrison (LB)
- 1992 – Rodney Edwards (LB)
- 1997 – Chris McNeil (DE)

Lineman of The Year

- 2001 – Qasim Mitchell
- 2015 – Brandon Parker
- 2016 - Brandon Parker
- 2017 - Brandon Parker

Rookie of The Year

- 2009 - Mike Mayhew
- 2013 - Tarik Cohen
- 2016 - Elijah Bell

=== Coaches ===
- MEAC Coach of the Year

Hornsby Howell (1974, 1975)
Jim Mckinley (1980)
Mo Forte (1986)
Bill Hayes (1991, 1999)
George Small (2003)
Rod Broadway (2017)

=== National awards ===
==== All-Americans ====
Below is a list of Walter Camp All-Americans selected by the Walter Camp Football Foundation.

Chris McNeil-1997

Below is a list of All Americans selected by The Associated Press (AP)

Name	Position	Year(s)	All-America Team
Demetrius Harrison	LB	1989	2nd Team
Craig Thompson	TE	1991	Honorable Mention
Curtis Burgins	DB	1993	3rd Team
James White	RB	1993	Honorable Mention
Ronald Edwards	OL	1993	Honorable Mention
Leevary Covington	LB	1993	Honorable Mention
Tim Johnson	LB	1994	Honorable Mention
Chris McNeil	DE	1997	1st Team
Darryl Klugh	DB	1999	2nd Team
Curtis Deloatch	RS	2001	1st Team
Maurice Hicks	RB	2001	3rd Team
Ronald Canty	OL	2014	2nd Team
Tarik Cohen	RB	2016	1st Team
Brandon Parker	OL	2016	2nd Team

Below is a list of All Americans selected by The American Urban Radio Network, American Sports Wire, Sheridan Black College Poll and other polls.

Name	Position	Year
John Daniels	C	1938
David Morris	DB	1974
Dwaine Board	E	1978
George Small	LB	1978
Ed Hooker	DB	1987
Demetrius Harrison	LB	1989 (Note: In 1989 Demetrius Harrison was named Defensive Player of the Year)
Craig Thompson	TE	1991
Kevin Little	DL	1991
Knox Thompson	DL	1991
Rodney Edwards	LB	1992
Alonza Barnett	DB	1992
Ronald Edwards	OL	1993
Curtis Burgins	DB	1994
Jamaine Stephens	OL	1995
Monty Key	P	1996
Chris McNeil	DL	1997 (Note: In 1997 Chris McNeil was named Defensive Player of the Year)
Darryl Klugh	DB	1999
Anthony Nobles	OL	2000
Marcus Bryson	TE	2001
Maurice Hicks	RB	2001
Qasim Mitchell	OL	2001
Yonnick Matthews	K	2003
Tarik Cohen	RB	2014
D'Vonte Grant	LB	2014
Cody Jones	PK	2014
Donald Mattocks	CB	2014
Tony McRae	CB	2014
William Ray Robinson III	OL	2014
Ronald Canty	OL	2014
Khris Gardin	WR	2015 (Note: In 2015, Gardin received All-American honors from STATS FCS (first team), BOXTOROW, and the FCS Athletics Directors Association.)

==== Buck Buchanan Award ====
Below is a list of Aggie Football players who have received The Buck Buchanan Award which is awarded annually to the most outstanding defensive player in the Division I-FCS.

Year	Winner	Position
1997	Chris McNeil	DE

== Team achievements ==
=== National championships ===
North Carolina A&T has been awarded the black college football national championship a total of eight times in the program's history. Though this title is not recognized by the NCAA, it is awarded to the best historically black collegiate program competing in either the NCAA's Division I FCS or Division II level.

Year	Coach	Selector	Overall record	Conference record
1951 (Note: The 1951 black college national football championship was shared with Morris Brown.)	William M. Bell	Associated Negro Press	7–1–1	5–1 (CIAA)
1968 (Note: The 1968 black college national football championship was shared with Alcorn A&M.)	Hornsby Howell	Pittsburgh Courier	8–1	6–1 (CIAA)
1990 (Note: The 1990 black college national football championship was shared with Central State.)	Bill Hayes	American Sports Wire	9–2	5–2 (MEAC)
1999	Bill Hayes	American Sports Wire	11–2	8–0 (MEAC)
2015	Rod Broadway	HSRN, BOXTOROW	10–2	7–1 (MEAC)
2017	Rod Broadway	BOXTOROW	12–0	8–0 (MEAC)
2018	Sam Washington	BOXTOROW	10–2	6–1 (MEAC)
2019	Sam Washington	BOXTOROW	9–3	6–2 (MEAC)
National championships			7

=== Undefeated seasons ===
Year	Record	Conference record	Coach
1927	8–0	7–0 (CIAA)	Lonnie P. Byarm
1943	7–0	2–0 (CIAA)	Charles U. DeBerry
2017	12–0	8–0 (MEAC)	Rod Broadway
Undefeated regular seasons			3
Perfect seasons (no losses or ties)			3

=== Conference championships ===
North Carolina A&T joined the Mid-Eastern Athletic Conference as a founding member in 1969. Before that the Aggies were members of the Central Intercollegiate Athletic Association (CIAA), where they won five conference titles. In their time in the MEAC, A&T won eleven conference titles.

Year	Coach	Conference	Overall record	Conference record
1927	Lonnie P. Byarm	CIAA	8–0	7–0
1950	William M. Bell	CIAA	6–2–1	5–0–1
1958	Bert Piggott	CIAA	7–2	7–0
1959	Bert Piggott	CIAA	6–2	6–0
1964	Bert Piggott	CIAA	6–3–1	6–0–1
1975 (Note: The 1975 MEAC Championship was shared with the South Carolina State Bulldogs)	Hornsby Howell	MEAC	8–3	5–1
1986	Mo Forte	MEAC	9–3	4–1
1991	Bill Hayes	MEAC	9–3	5–1
1992	Bill Hayes	MEAC	9–3	5–1
1999	Bill Hayes	MEAC	11–2	8–0
2003	George Small	MEAC	10–3	6–1
2014 (Note: The 2014 MEAC Championship was shared between Bethune-Cookman, Morgan State, North Carolina Central & South Carolina State)	Rod Broadway	MEAC	9–3	6–2
2015 (Note: The 2015 MEAC Championship was shared between Bethune-Cookman and North Carolina Central)	Rod Broadway	MEAC	9–3	6–2
2017	Rod Broadway	MEAC	12–0	8–0
2018	Sam Washington	MEAC	10–2	6–1
2019 (Note: The 2019 MEAC Championship was shared with South Carolina State)	Sam Washington	MEAC	9–3	6–2
Total conference championships			16

=== Bowl games ===
Date played	Bowl Game	Winning team	Losing team
January 1, 1943	Flower Bowl	North Carolina A&T (20)	Southern (12)
January 1, 1945	Flower Bowl	Tyler Junior College (18)	North Carolina A&T (0)
January 1, 1949	Vulcan Bowl	Kentucky State (23)	North Carolina A&T (3)
December 10, 1949	Orange Blossom Classic	North Carolina A&T (20)	Florida A&M (14)
December 2, 1978	Gold Bowl	Virginia Union (21)	North Carolina A&T (6)
December 6, 1980	Gold Bowl	North Carolina A&T (37)	North Carolina Central (0)
December 21, 1991	Heritage Bowl	Alabama State (36)	North Carolina A&T (13)
December 19, 2015	Celebration Bowl	North Carolina A&T (41)	Alcorn State (34)
December 16, 2017	Celebration Bowl	North Carolina A&T (21)	Grambling (14)
December 15, 2018	Celebration Bowl	North Carolina A&T (24)	Alcorn State (22)
December 21, 2019	Celebration Bowl	North Carolina A&T (64)	Alcorn State (44)
Overall Bowl Record		7–4 (11 games)	

=== NCAA Division I-AA/FCS playoff results ===
The Aggies have appeared in the NCAA Division I Football Championship playoffs five times with an overall record of 1–5.

Year	Round	Opponent	Result
1986	Quarterfinals	Georgia Southern	L 21–52
1992	First Round	The Citadel	L 0–44
1999	First Round; Quarterfinals	Tennessee State; Youngstown State	W 24–10; L 3–41
2003	First Round	Wofford	L 0–31
2016	First Round	Richmond	L 10–39

=== All-time record vs. current MEAC teams ===
This table reflects the results of MEAC matchups when both N.C. A&T and its opponent were members of the conference. A&T began MEAC play in 1970; this list has been updated through the 2013 NCAA Division I FCS football season.

Opponent	Won	Lost	Tied	Percentage	Streak	First Meeting
Bethune-Cookman	14	22	0	.389	lost 1	1977
Delaware State	20	22	1	.477	Lost 1	1971
Florida A&M	44	11	3	.266	Won 2	1938
Howard	25	20	2	.553	Won 2	1924
Maryland Eastern Shore (Note: Maryland Eastern Shore discontinued its football program in 1980.)	13	13	2	.500	Lost 1	1952
Morgan State	36	43	3	.457	Lost 2	1930
Norfolk State	28	11	0	.718	Won 1	1962
North Carolina Central	49	31	5	.606	Won 3	1924
South Carolina State	18	31	2	.373	Lost 1	1924
Totals	234	263	19	.472		

== Notable players ==
Many North Carolina A&T Aggie players have gone on to play football in the professional ranks. Former Aggie football player Elvin Bethea has been inducted to the Pro Football Hall of Fame, while several former players; including Mel Phillips, George Ragsdale, George Small, and Connell Maynor have gone on to become coaches for NFL and college teams.

=== Aggies in the pros ===
Aggies in the NFL
NFL Draft Selections
Total Selected	35
First picks in draft	0
1st Round	1
Total Players	61
In the Pro Bowl	4
In the Super Bowl, NFL or AFL Championship	3
Hall of Famers	3

Over 70 former North Carolina A&T players have gone on to play professionally for the NFL, CFL, AFL and other leagues including: Michael Basnight, James Bowden, Jessie Britt, Dwaine Carpenter, Tarik Cohen, Junius Coston, Tom Day, Curtis Deloatch, Henry Douglas, Cornell Gordon, Michael Hamilton, Maurice Hicks, Melvin Holmes, Jason Horton, Toran James, Jamal Jones, Wallace Miles, Qasim Mitchell, Brandon Parker, Mel Phillips, George Ragsdale, George Small, Maurice Smith, Jamain Stephens, Walter Stith, Joe Taylor, Dick Westmoreland, Reggie White and Donald Willis.

Other notable former Aggie football players include: Robert "Stonewall" Jackson, the first player from a Historically Black College to be drafted into the NFL; Pro Bowl player J.D. Smith; Super Bowl champions Dwaine Board, Cornell Gordon, Troy Pelshak; and Hall of fame inductee Elvin Bethea Brad Holmes, General Manager of the Detroit Lions

== Head coaching history ==
The Aggies have had 19 coaches in their 113-year history. William "Bill" Hayes holds the distinction of being the All-Time Winningest Coach in the program's history, with 106 victories. Over the span of his 15-season career at A&T, Hayes let the Aggies to 2 Black College National titles, the program's first ever win in the NCAA I-AA playoffs, and 3 MEAC titles. Other notable A&T football coaches include Hornsby Howell, who led the team to its first MEAC championship; and Burt Piggott, who led the Aggies to 3 CIAA championships and 8 consecutive winning seasons, a feat unmatched by any coach in the history of the program.

Rod Broadway became coach in 2011, after leaving Grambling State University. In 2012, Broadway lead the Aggies to their first winning season in 9 years. In 2018, Sam Washington was named head coach after the retirement of Rod Broadway.

== Future non-conference opponents ==
Announced Schedules as of October 13, 2026

In 2024, A&T announced a 10-Year home and home agreement with arch-rival North Carolina Central that will go through the 2030 season.

2026	2027	2028	2029	2030	2031
Morgan State	vs North Carolina Central (Duke's Mayo Classic)	at North Carolina (FBS)	North Carolina Central	at North Carolina Central	at Princeton
at Georgia State (FBS)	at NC State (FBS)	at North Carolina Central		at Georgia (FBS)	
at North Carolina Central	at Chicago State	Tennessee State		Princeton	
Chicago State	Ferrum College	at Morgan State			
