= 2015 Jackson State Tigers football team =

American college football season

2015 Jackson State Tigers football
- Conference: Southwestern Athletic Conference
- East Division
- Record: 3–8 (3–6 SWAC)
- Head coach: Harold Jackson (2nd season; first 5 games); Derrick McCall (interim; remainder of season)
- Offensive coordinator: Timmy Chang (2nd season)
- Offensive scheme: Run and shoot
- Defensive coordinator: Alonzo Lee (1st season)
- Base defense: 4–3
- Home stadium: Mississippi Veterans Memorial Stadium

2015 Southwestern Athletic Conference football standings
	Conf.			Overall
Team	W		L	W		L
East Division
Alcorn State xy$	7	–	2	9	–	4
Alabama State *	5	–	4	6	–	5
Alabama A&M	3	–	6	3	–	8
Jackson State	3	–	6	3	–	8
Mississippi Valley State	1	–	8	1	–	10
West Division
No. 24 Grambling State xy	9	–	0	9	–	3
Prairie View A&M	8	–	1	8	–	2
Southern	6	–	3	6	–	5
Texas Southern	2	–	7	3	–	7
Arkansas–Pine Bluff	1	–	8	2	–	9
Championship: Alcorn State 49, Grambling State 21
$ – Conference champion; x – Division champion/co-champions; y – Championship game participant; * – Ineligible for postseason due to APR violations; Rankings from STATS Poll

The 2015 Jackson State Tigers football team represented Jackson State University in the 2015 NCAA Division I FCS football season. The Tigers were led by second-year head coach Harold Jackson for the first five games of the season before he was fired. Wide receivers coach Derrick McCall was named the interim head coach for the remainder of the season. They played their home games at Mississippi Veterans Memorial Stadium. They were a member of the East Division of the Southwestern Athletic Conference. They finished the season 3–8, 3–6 in SWAC play to finish in a tie for third place in the East Division.

== Schedule ==
Date	Time	Opponent	Site	TV	Result	Attendance
September 5	6:00 pm	at Middle Tennessee*	Johnny "Red" Floyd Stadium; Murfreesboro, TN	GBR	L 14–70	15,908
September 12	6:00 pm	vs. Tennessee State*	Liberty Bowl Memorial Stadium; Memphis, TN (Southern Heritage Classic)	SPSO	L 25–35	48,385
September 19	6:00 pm	at Southern	Ace W. Mumford Stadium; Baton Rouge, LA (Boombox Classic)	ESPN3	L 31–50	26,413
September 26	6:00 pm	Texas Southern	Mississippi Veterans Memorial Stadium; Jackson, MS (W.C. Gordon Classic)	JSUtv	W 34–30	8,517
October 3	6:00 pm	Grambling State	Mississippi Veterans Memorial Stadium; Jackson, MS	JSUtv	L 27–59	16,753
October 17	1:00 pm	at Alabama A&M	Louis Crews Stadium; Huntsville, AL		L 22–28	10,110
October 24	2:00 pm	Arkansas–Pine Bluff^{†}	Mississippi Veterans Memorial Stadium; Jackson, MS	JSUtv	W 37–3	24,579
October 31	4:00 pm	at Mississippi Valley State	Rice–Totten Field; Itta Bena, MS		W 26–16	3,827
November 7	6:00 pm	Alabama State	Mississippi Veterans Memorial Stadium; Jackson, MS	JSUtv	L 12–17	1,649
November 21	4:00 pm	at Prairie View A&M	Waller ISD Football Stadium; Waller, TX	YouTube	L 14–56	4,719
November 28	2:00 pm	Alcorn State	Mississippi Veterans Memorial Stadium; Jackson, MS (Soul Bowl)	JSUtv	L 10–14	23,101
*Non-conference game; ^{†}Homecoming; All times are in Central time
