= Derrick McCall =

American football coach (born c. 1961)

Biographical details
- Born: c. 1961 (age 64–65); Mobile, Alabama, U.S.
- Education: Spring Hill College (2001)

Playing career
- 1979–1983: Jackson State
- Position: Quarterback

Coaching career (HC unless noted)
- 1997: Shaw HS (AL) (QB)
- 1998–2000: Blount HS (AL) (AHC/OC)
- 2000: Mobile Seagulls (QB)
- 2001–2004: Tuskegee (WR)
- 2005–2007: Shaw (assoc. HC/OC)
- 2008–2009: Jackson State (WR)
- 2010–2011: Jackson State (QB)
- 2012–2015: Jackson State (OC/QB)
- 2015: Jackson State (interim HC)
- 2016–2017: Jackson State (WR)
- 2017: Jackson State (interim OC/WR)
- 2021–2023: Lane (AHC/QB)

Head coaching record
- Overall: 2–4

Derrick McCall (born c. 1961) is an American college football coach. He was the head football coach for Jackson State University in 2015. He also coached for Shaw High School, Mattie T. Blount High School, the Mobile Seagulls of the Professional Indoor Football League (PIFL), Tuskegee, Shaw, and Lane. He played college football for Jackson State as a quarterback.

== Head coaching record ==
Year	Team	Overall	Conference	Standing	Bowl/playoffs
Jackson State Tigers (Southwestern Athletic Conference) (2015)
2015	Jackson State	2–4 (Note: McCall was named interim head coach with six weeks remaining in the season following the firing of Harold Jackson.)	2–4	T–3rd (East)	
Jackson State:		2–4	2–4		
Total:		2–4			
