= Hoke County High School =

American public school in North Carolina

Location
- 505 S Bethel Rd; Raeford, North Carolina 28376; United States; 34°58′22″N 79°14′09″W

Information
- School type: Public
- Established: 1960 (66 years ago)
- School district: Hoke County Schools
- Staff: 112.67 (FTE)
- Grades: 9–12
- Enrollment: 2,110 (2024-2025)
- Student to teacher ratio: 18.73
- Colors: Red and white
- Athletics: NCHSAA 8A
- Athletics conference: Mid-South 7A/8A
- Team name: Bucks
- Website: hchs.hcs.k12.nc.us/our-school/about-us

Hoke County High School is a public high school in Raeford, North Carolina. It is a part of the Hoke County Schools district.

== History ==
Hoke County High School was established in 1960.

== Athletics ==
Hoke County is a member of the North Carolina High School Athletic Association (NCHSAA) and are classified as a 8A school. The school is a part of the Mid-South 7A/8A Conference. The school colors are red and white, and its team name is the Bucks.

Sports at Hoke County include: baseball, basketball, cheerleading, cross country, football, golf, soccer, softball, swimming, tennis, track & field, volleyball, and wrestling.

The women's outdoor track and field team won five straight NCHSAA all classes state championships in 1972, 1973, 1974, 1975 and 1976. The baseball team won the NCHSAA 4A state championship in 1990.

== Notable alumni ==
- Carol Fowler Durham, leader in the fields of Healthcare Quality and Safety, nursing education, interprofessional education, and medical simulation
- William Kershaw, former NFL linebacker
- Gil McGregor, professional basketball player
- Terrell McIntyre, professional basketball player
- Kathy McMillan, Olympic long jumper, silver medalist at the 1976 Summer Olympics
- Detrez Newsome, former NFL running back
- John Roper, former MLB pitcher
- George Small, former NFL player and college football coach
- Brenda Thiam, American politician
- Earl Wolff, former NFL safety
