= James Spady =

American football player and coach (born 1966)

Current position
- Title: Associate head coach, tight ends coach
- Team: Florida A&M
- Conference: MEAC

Biographical details
- Born: January 5, 1966 (age 60); San Antonio, Texas, U.S.

Playing career
- 1985–1988: UTEP
- 1991: Denver Dynamite
- 1992: Sacramento Attack
- Position: Center

Coaching career (HC unless noted)
- 1993–1995: UTEP (GA)
- 1996–1999: UTEP (TE)
- 2000–2003: UTEP (DL)
- 2004–2005: South Carolina State (OL)
- 2006: North Carolina Central (OL)
- 2007–2009: Grambling State (OC/OL)
- 2010–2013: Nevada (TE)
- 2014–2017: Alabama A&M
- 2018–2021: Florida A&M (assoc. HC/ST/TE)
- 2022-present: Florida A&M (assoc. HC/TE)

Head coaching record
- Overall: 15–30

Accomplishments and honors

Awards
- 2× All-WAC (1987–1988)

James Michael Spady (born January 5, 1966) is an American college football coach and former player. He is currently the associate head coach and tight ends coach at Florida A&M University. Spady previously served as the head coach at Alabama Agricultural and Mechanical University (AAMU), a position he held from December 2013 until November 2017. Spady is a member of Phi Beta Sigma fraternity.

== Head coaching record ==
| Year | Team | Overall | Conference | Standing | Bowl/playoffs |
|---|---|---|---|---|---|
Alabama A&M Bulldogs (Southwestern Athletic Conference) (2014–2017)
| 2014 | Alabama A&M | 4–8 | 3–6 | T–3rd (East) | |
| 2015 | Alabama A&M | 3–8 | 3–6 | T–3rd (East) | |
| 2016 | Alabama A&M | 4–7 | 4–5 | 2nd (East) | |
| 2017 | Alabama A&M | 4–7 | 3–4 | T–2nd (East) | |
| Alabama A&M: | | 15–30 | 13–21 | | |
| Total: | | 15–30 | | | |
