= 2015 Prairie View A&M Panthers football team =

American college football season

2015 Prairie View A&M Panthers football
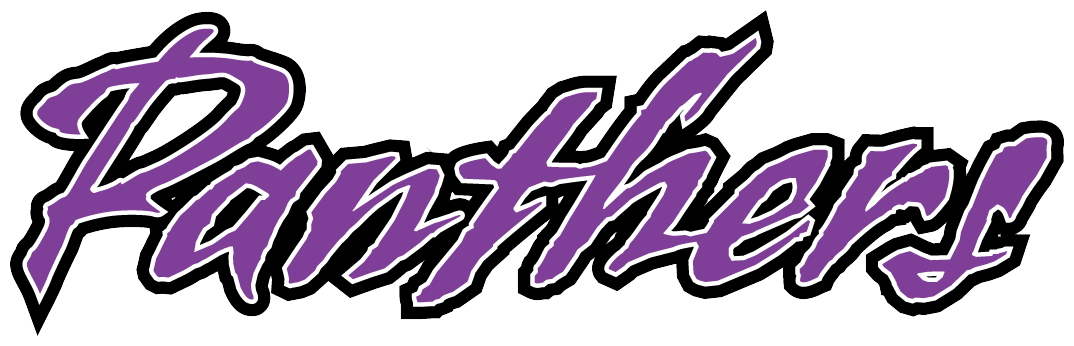
- Conference: Southwestern Athletic Conference
- West Division
- Record: 8–2 (8–1 SWAC)
- Head coach: Willie Simmons (1st season)
- Offensive coordinator: Alex Jackson (1st season)
- Defensive coordinator: Ralph Street (1st season)
- Home stadium: Waller ISD Football Stadium

2015 Southwestern Athletic Conference football standings
	Conf.			Overall
Team	W		L	W		L
East Division
Alcorn State xy$	7	–	2	9	–	4
Alabama State *	5	–	4	6	–	5
Alabama A&M	3	–	6	3	–	8
Jackson State	3	–	6	3	–	8
Mississippi Valley State	1	–	8	1	–	10
West Division
No. 24 Grambling State xy	9	–	0	9	–	3
Prairie View A&M	8	–	1	8	–	2
Southern	6	–	3	6	–	5
Texas Southern	2	–	7	3	–	7
Arkansas–Pine Bluff	1	–	8	2	–	9
Championship: Alcorn State 49, Grambling State 21
$ – Conference champion; x – Division champion/co-champions; y – Championship game participant; * – Ineligible for postseason due to APR violations; Rankings from STATS Poll

The 2015 Prairie View A&M Panthers football team represented Prairie View A&M University in the 2015 NCAA Division I FCS football season. The Panthers were led by first year head coach Willie Simmons and played their home games at Waller ISD Football Stadium in Waller, Texas due to renovations at Edward L. Blackshear Field. They were a member of the West Division of the Southwestern Athletic Conference (SWAC). They finished the season 8–2, 8–1 in SWAC play to finish in second place in the West Division.

== Schedule ==
Date	Time	Opponent	Site	TV	Result	Attendance
September 5	8:00 pm	at Texas Southern	BBVA Compass Stadium; Houston, TX (Labor Day Classic)	RTSW+	W 38–11	19,075
September 12	6:00 pm	at Texas State*	Bobcat Stadium; San Marcos, TX	ESPN3	L 24–63	24,561
September 19	6:00 pm	Alabama A&M	Waller ISD Football Stadium; Waller, TX	YouTube	W 53–49	5,042
September 26	4:00 pm	vs. Grambling State	Cotton Bowl; Dallas, TX (State Fair Classic)	YouTube	L 54–70	51,328
October 3	1:00 pm	University of Faith±*	Waller ISD Football Stadium; Waller, TX	YouTube	W 42–0	N/A
October 10	2:00 pm	Mississippi Valley State^{†}	Waller ISD Football Stadium; Waller, TX	YouTube	W 45–6	7,113
October 17	4:00 pm	at Southern	Ace W. Mumford Stadium; Baton Rouge, LA	CST	W 47–42	23,112
October 31	1:00 pm	Arkansas–Pine Bluff	Waller ISD Football Stadium; Waller, TX	YouTube	W 54–29	1,614
November 7	2:00 pm	at Alcorn State	Casem-Spinks Stadium; Lorman, MS		W 40–34	5,239
November 14	2:00 pm	at Alabama State	The New ASU Stadium; Montgomery, AL		W 38–13	6,011
November 21	1:00 pm	Jackson State	Waller ISD Football Stadium; Waller, TX	YouTube	W 56–14	4,719
*Non-conference game; ^{†}Homecoming; All times are in Central time

± University of Faith did not meet NCAA accreditation guidelines and all stats and records from this game do not count.
