= 2015 Mississippi Valley State Delta Devils football team =

American college football season

2015 Mississippi Valley State Delta Devils football
- Conference: Southwestern Athletic Conference
- East Division
- Record: 1–10 (1–8 SWAC)
- Head coach: Rick Comegy (2nd season)
- Offensive coordinator: Shawn Gregory (2nd season)
- Defensive coordinator: Vincent Dancy (1st season)
- Home stadium: Rice–Totten Stadium

2015 Southwestern Athletic Conference football standings
	Conf.			Overall
Team	W		L	W		L
East Division
Alcorn State xy$	7	–	2	9	–	4
Alabama State *	5	–	4	6	–	5
Alabama A&M	3	–	6	3	–	8
Jackson State	3	–	6	3	–	8
Mississippi Valley State	1	–	8	1	–	10
West Division
No. 24 Grambling State xy	9	–	0	9	–	3
Prairie View A&M	8	–	1	8	–	2
Southern	6	–	3	6	–	5
Texas Southern	2	–	7	3	–	7
Arkansas–Pine Bluff	1	–	8	2	–	9
Championship: Alcorn State 49, Grambling State 21
$ – Conference champion; x – Division champion/co-champions; y – Championship game participant; * – Ineligible for postseason due to APR violations; Rankings from STATS Poll

The 2015 Mississippi Valley State Delta Devils football team represented Mississippi Valley State University as a member of the East Division of the Southwestern Athletic Conference (SWAC) during the 2015 NCAA Division I FCS football season. Led by second-year head coach Rick Comegy, the Delta Devils compiled an overall record of 1–10 and a mark of 1–8 in conference play, placing last out of five teams in the SWAC's East Division. Mississippi Valley State played home games at Rice–Totten Stadium in Itta Bena, Mississippi.

== Schedule ==
Date	Time	Opponent	Site	TV	Result	Attendance
September 5	6:00 pm	at New Mexico*	University Stadium; Albuquerque, NM		L 0–66	21,930
September 10	6:30 pm	Southern	Rice–Totten Stadium; Itta Bena, MS	ESPNU	L 13–50	2,348
September 19	2:00 pm	at Alcorn State	Casem-Spinks Stadium; Lorman, MS		L 14–55	7,415
September 26	6:00 pm	Alabama State	Rice–Totten Stadium; Itta Bena, MS		L 15–45	4,026
October 3	1:00 pm	at No. 1 Jacksonville State*	Burgess–Snow Field at JSU Stadium; Jacksonville, AL		L 7–49	13,889
October 10	1:00 pm	at Prairie View A&M	Waller ISD Football Stadium; Waller, TX		L 6–45	7,113
October 17	2:00 pm	Texas Southern^{†}	Rice–Totten Stadium; Itta Bena, MS		L 21–49	4,297
October 24	2:00 pm	at Grambling State	Eddie Robinson Stadium; Grambling, LA		L 14–49	10,536
October 31	4:00 pm	Jackson State	Rice–Totten Stadium; Itta Bena, MS		L 16–26	3,827
November 7	2:00 pm	at Alabama A&M	Louis Crews Stadium; Huntsville, AL		W 27–24 ^{OT}	2,478
November 21	1:00 pm	Arkansas–Pine Bluff	Rice–Totten Stadium; Itta Bena, MS		L 19–25 ^{OT}	1,313
*Non-conference game; ^{†}Homecoming; Rankings from STATS Poll released prior to the game; All times are in Central time
