= Carol Fowler Durham =

American academic

Carol F. Durham, EdD, RN, ANEF, FAAN
- Born: Carol Fowler; September 8, 1954; Laurinburg, North Carolina
- Education: Western Carolina University (BSN); University of North Carolina at Chapel Hill (MSN); North Carolina State University (EdD)
- Known for: Clinical Professor of Nursing at the University of North Carolina at Chapel Hill School of Nursing
- Spouse: Stephen McCoy Durham
- Children: Brandon Durham; Rebecca Cozart
- Scientific career
- Fields: Healthcare Quality and Safety, Nursing, Nurse education, Interprofessional education

Carol Fowler Durham (September 8, 1954) is an American Clinical Professor of Nursing and Doctor of Education who is known as a leader in the fields of Healthcare Quality and Safety, nursing education, interprofessional education, and medical simulation.

Durham was inducted as a Fellow of the National League for Nursing Academy of Nursing Education in 2009 and inducted as a Fellow of the American Academy of Nursing in 2013.

Durham is a professor and Director of the Education-Innovation-Simulation Learning Environment (EISLE) for the University of North Carolina at Chapel Hill School of Nursing.

She is also a past president of the International Nursing Association for Clinical Simulation and Learning and the Sigma Theta Tau Alpha Alpha chapter. As of 2016, Durham also serves on the board of directors for the Global Network for Simulation in Healthcare.

== Background ==
Durham was born on September 8, 1954 in Laurinburg, North Carolina, to Henry and Marie Fowler. She was the oldest of two children and they grew up in Rockfish, North Carolina.

Durham's father died when she was 13 years old after eight years with scleroderma. He died in the VA hospital in Fayetteville, North Carolina, and Durham was inspired by the nurses who provided care to her father. That is what led to her interest in pursuing a career in nursing.

== Early education and career ==
Durham attended Hoke County High School in Raeford, North Carolina, where she graduated in 1972.

In 1976, Durham graduated with a Bachelor of Science in Nursing from Western Carolina University in Cullowhee, North Carolina. Following graduation, Durham worked as a staff nurse at CJ Harris Hospital in Sylva, North Carolina. Durham moved to Raleigh, North Carolina, where she worked as a coronary care unit nurse at Rex Hospital.

Durham worked as a research data technician at the University of North Carolina at Chapel Hill School of Nursing while working on her Master of Science in Nursing. Following her graduation in 1982, Durham began as an instructor in the UNC School of Nursing while working in cardiac rehabilitation and patient educator at the non-profit Orange Cardiovascular Foundation.

== Simulation ==
While at UNC, Durham was a teaching assistant in the skills lab in 1981. The skills labs at UNC were renamed in 1996 under Durham's direction. The lab was once again renamed to become the School of Nursing Education-Innovation-Simulation Learning Environment (EISLE) where Durham has continued to grow educational methodologies beyond traditional nursing education into interprofessional education and medical simulation.

Durham is an internationally recognized expert in simulation for quality improvement, education, and assessment with simulation methodologies.

Durham has been a member of the RWJFs Quality and Safety Education for Nurses (QSEN) project since 2005, when she developed simulation-based educational activities to reflect cutting-edge pedagogy.

In 2009, Durham completed the Doctor of Education program at North Carolina State University concentrating on adult and higher education.

The National League for Nursing invited Durham to a "Debriefing Strategic Think Tank" in 2014 to provide guidance for "Debriefing Across the Curriculum". This event was held in collaboration with International Nursing Association for Clinical Simulation and Learning.

In 2015, Durham was invited by the National Council of State Boards of Nursing (NCSBN) to join the eight member task force that developed simulation guidelines for state boards of nursing in response to the NCSBN Simulation Study.

The North Carolina AHEC sponsored a Faculty Development Institute with Drs. Durham and Gwen Sherwood providing webinars to improving continuing interprofessional education in 2015.

In 2016, Durham's team continued their interprofessional work with North Carolina State University College of Veterinary Medicine. The team's One Health case submission was recognized in a national competition by the Association of American Veterinary Medical Colleges (AAVMC) and Association for Prevention Teaching and Research.

Durham served on the Terminology & Concepts Working Group for the Agency for Healthcare Research and Quality's "Healthcare Simulation Dictionary".

As of 2016, Durham also serves on the board of directors for the Global Network for Simulation in Healthcare.

== Sepsis survivor ==
Durham was diagnosed with sepsis in November 2010. Surviving this critical event sparked Durham's desire to raise awareness of septic shock and how it is treated.

In 2016, Durham was the Honorary Event Chair for the Third Annual Step-On-Sepsis™ awareness event.

BioMérieux opened a plant in the Research Triangle Park that will focus on production of bottled sepsis blood cultures in 2017. Durham was a speaker at this event and shared her experience as both a nurse and sepsis survivor.

== Awards ==
Durham was inducted into the Sigma Theta Tau Honor Society Alpha Alpha chapter in 1982.

She was recognized with the Outstanding Faculty Award in 2000.

In 2005, Durham was awarded the Nurse Educator of the Year from the NC Nursing Association.

The U.S. Department of Veterans Affairs VISN 8 Patient Safety Center of Inquiry awarded Durham their Educator Award in 2006 for Safe Patient Handling for its outstanding efforts to change nursing curriculum, including evidence-based approaches for safe patient handling.

The North Carolina Center for Nursing featured Durham in a nurse educator profile on their web site from 2006 to 2007.

The healthcare simulation company METI presented Durham with their Innovative Educator Award in 2007.

Durham received the Alumni of the Year award from both the University of North Carolina and Western Carolina University in 2008.

Durham was inducted into the highly selective National League for Nursing (NLN) Academy of Nursing Education in 2009. Durham is also a member of the Simulation Innovation and Resource Center (SIRC) project headed by the NLN.

The third Laurel Archer Copp Literary Award was presented to Durham in 2009. This award is “given to faculty for outstanding scholarly writing”.

The Drexel University BAYADA Technology Award was also presented to Durham in 2009.

Durham received the 2010 Academic Achievement Award from Western Carolina University.

The American Academy of Nursing inducted Durham as a Fellow in 2013.

In 2017, Durham received the Society for Simulation in Healthcare Presidential Citation at their annual scientific meeting for her continued efforts in the field.

== Personal life ==
Durham met her husband Stephen McCoy Durham while in college and they married in 1976. They share an interest in simulation and her husband is a standardized patient at UNC.

They have two children, Brandon Durham and Rebecca Cozart. In 2016, Durham collaborated on a One Health project with Cozart who is a veterinarian.

They currently reside in Hillsborough, North Carolina.
