= Brandon Parker =

American football player (born 1995)

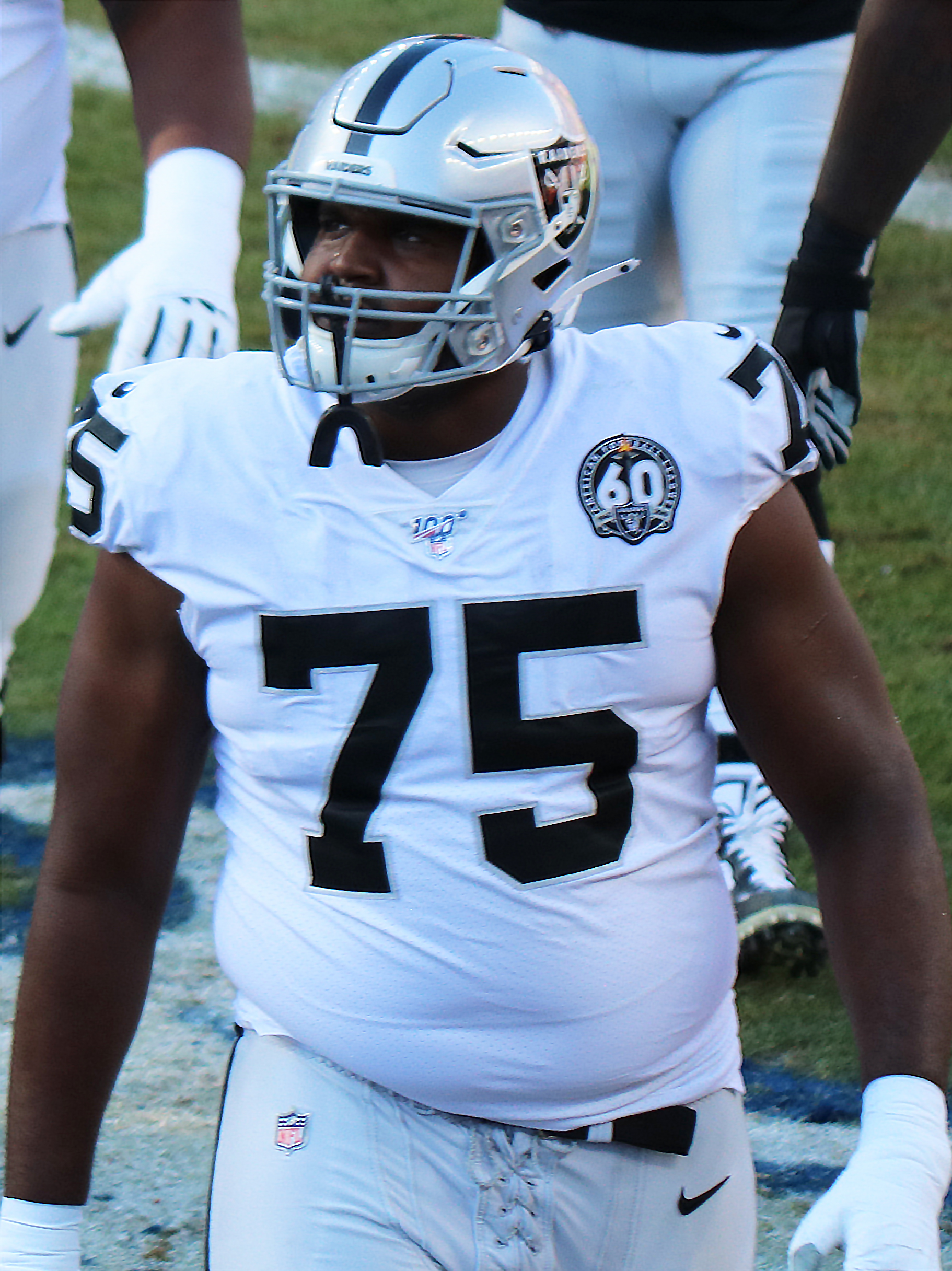
- Parker with the Oakland Raiders in 2019

Profile
- Position: Offensive tackle

Personal information
- Born: October 21, 1995 (age 31); Kannapolis, North Carolina, U.S.
- Listed height: 6 ft 8 in (2.03 m)
- Listed weight: 320 lb (145 kg)

Career information
- High school: A.L. Brown (Kannapolis)
- College: North Carolina A&T (2013–2017)
- NFL draft: 2018: 3rd round, 65th overall pick

Career history
- Oakland / Las Vegas Raiders (2018–2023); San Francisco 49ers (2024)*; Atlanta Falcons (2024–2025)*; San Francisco 49ers (2025)*
- * Offseason or practice squad member only

Awards and highlights
- First-team All-American (2017); Second-team All-American (2016); MEAC Offensive Lineman of the Year (2015–2017); First-team All-MEAC (2015–2017); Third-team All-MEAC (2014)

Career NFL statistics as of 2025
- Games played: 59
- Games started: 33
- Stats at Pro Football Reference

Brandon Malik Parker (born October 21, 1995) is an American professional football offensive tackle. He played college football for the North Carolina A&T Aggies before being selected by the Oakland Raiders in the third round of the 2018 NFL draft.

== Early life ==
Parker was born in Kannapolis, North Carolina, to George Curtis Parker III and his wife Regina. Both of his parents have athletic backgrounds. Parker attended A.L. Brown High School, in Kannapolis, North Carolina where he started two of the three years he playing varsity football. During his senior year, Parker led the Wonders to an 8–4 record. During Parker's high school career, the wonders averaged 287 yards rushing per game and completed 62.4 percent of its passes.

== College career ==
Parker's tall and lanky frame was a point of concern and limited the number of schools interested in recruiting him for football. In an interview with Brian McLaughlin of Herosports.com, Parker said "I really wasn't highly sought after coming out of high school, because of my frame, and I didn't have really good film my junior year; My senior year, I didn't really get any kind of accolades. You had to come to my school to know anything about me. I was a much slimmer guy, if you can believe that...With schools like Alabama and Clemson, they're looking for the guy who is ready to go right now." Parker received full scholarship offers from Division II Winston-Salem State, FCS North Carolina A&T, North Carolina Central; a partial scholarship from his father's alma mater North Carolina; & preferred walk-on spots from then FCS Appalachian State, Charlotte, & FBS Duke. He would then sign with North Carolina A&T as one of their 22 signees recruited under Head Coach Rod Broadway.

=== 2014 season ===
Parker was redshirted during the 2013 football season. In 2014, he was projected to be second on the Aggies depth chart at the left tackle position behind William Robinson. When Robinson went down with an injury, Parker was placed as starter. Parker started in all 12 games played that season, having standout performances against Florida A&M and Morgan State. Parker would conclude the season earning third-team All-MEAC honors. His contributions to the team resulted in Quarterback Kwashaun Quick having his best passing season of his career, as Parker prevented Quick from being sacked.

=== 2015 season ===
Parker, who started for all 12 games of the season had impressive showings against Florida A&M and at the Celebration Bowl against Alcorn State. Parker averaged 4 pancake blocks per game while successfully never surrendering a sack from his position at left tackle. Parker's style of play led to only 2 penalties called against him in 2015, which contributed to the Aggies being 2nd in the MEAC in offense. Parker finished his season with a number of accolades, including All-American honors from both American Urban Radio Networks and Boxtorow. Parker was also named the MEAC Offensive Lineman of the Year, becoming the second player in the program's history to win the award behind Qasim Mitchell who won in 2001.

=== 2016 season ===
Parker started all 12 games of the 2016 football season, earning MEAC offensive lineman of the week a total of five times. Parker was involved in 779 gradable plays during the 2016 football season including: 48 total knockdowns with an average 87% grade. Parker also graded out higher than 90% on 5 occasions, contributing to A&T being rated 1st in total offense and rushing offense; and 3rd in passing offense in the MEAC. At the conclusion of the season, Parker was named to the All-MEAC first team and awarded the conference's Offensive lineman of the year award for the second consecutive season. In addition to his conference honors, he was named an FCS second team All-American by the Associated Press.

=== 2017 season ===
Parker entered his final season with A&T as the starting left tackle for all 12 games of the 2017 season. Parker's stingy blocking resulted in 0 sacks by his opponents, resulting in him never allowing a single sack in his entire collegiate career. Parker was awarded the MEAC Offensive Lineman of the Year award, becoming the first player to win the award in 3 consecutive seasons. His performance also earned him 1st team FCS All-America honors and an invite to the Senior Bowl.

== Professional career ==
=== Pre-draft ===
On November 20, 2017, it was announced that Parker had accepted his invitation to play in the 2018 Senior Bowl. On January 27, 2018, Parker played in the 2018 Reese's Senior Bowl as part of Houston Texans head coach Bill O'Brien's South team who defeated the North 45–16. His overall performance at the Senior Bowl impressed scouts and team representatives and helped raise his draft stock. Parker was among 20 Football Championship Subdivision (FCS) players who received an invitation to attend the NFL Scouting Combine. Parker attended the NFL Scouting Combine in Indianapolis and completed the majority of combine drills, but opted to skip the bench press. His overall combine performance was considered fair among scouts as he finished third among all offensive linemen in the broad jump and ninth in the vertical jump.

External videos
- Brandon Parker's NFL Combine Workout

Parker attended pre-draft visits and private workouts with multiple teams including the San Diego Chargers, Cincinnati Bengals, Philadelphia Eagles, New Orleans Saints, Buffalo Bills, New York Giants and Carolina Panthers. On April 2, Parker participated at North Carolina A&T's pro day and chose to perform the 40-yard dash (5.42s), 20-yard dash (3.08s), 10-yard dash (1.78s), and bench press (21 reps). At the conclusion of the pre-draft process, Parker was projected to be a fourth or fifth-round pick by the majority of NFL draft experts and scouts. He was ranked the 13th best offensive tackle prospect in the draft by DraftScout.com and was ranked the 14th best offensive tackle by Scouts Inc.

Pre-draft measurables
Height	Weight	Arm length	Hand span	Wingspan	40-yard dash	10-yard split	20-yard split	20-yard shuttle	Three-cone drill	Vertical jump	Broad jump	Bench press
6 ft 7 5/8 in (2.02 m)	305 lb (138 kg)	35 in (0.89 m)	9 3/4 in (0.25 m)	7 ft 0 7/8 in (2.16 m)	5.40 s	1.83 s	3.10 s	4.68 s	7.82 s	28.5 in (0.72 m)	9 ft 5 in (2.87 m)	21 reps
All values from NFL Scouting Combine/Pro Day

=== Oakland / Las Vegas Raiders ===
The Oakland Raiders selected Parker in the third round (65th overall) of the 2018 NFL draft. He was the fifth offensive tackle selected in 2018. The Raiders traded their third (75th overall; the Kansas City Chiefs selected Derrick Nnadi), fifth (152nd overall; the Tennessee Titans selected Dane Cruikshank), and seventh round (212th overall; Greg Senat) picks to the Baltimore Ravens in exchange for the Ravens' third-round pick to draft Parker.

External videos
- Raiders draft Brandon Parker 65th overall

On May 21, 2018, Oakland signed Parker to a four-year, $4.09 million contract that included a signing bonus of $1.05 million. Parker was named the Raiders' starting right tackle in Week 5 after a season-ending injury to Donald Penn. He allowed 8.5 sacks in his rookie year.

In 2019, Parker started three games at right tackle. In 2021, he was named the starting right tackle in Week 5 and started the remainder of the season.

On March 21, 2022, Parker re-signed with the Raiders. On August 28, Parker was placed on injured reserve.

On March 10, 2023, Parker re-signed with the Raiders. He was placed on injured reserve on August 15 and released August 24. On November 6, Parker was re-signed to the Raiders practice squad. He was signed to the active roster on December 12.

=== San Francisco 49ers (first stint) ===
On March 18, 2024, Parker signed a one–year contract with the San Francisco 49ers. On August 27, Parker was released by the 49ers as part of final roster cuts. On September 2, Parker was re-signed by the 49ers and released a week later.

=== Atlanta Falcons ===
On September 10, 2024, Parker was signed by the Atlanta Falcons.

Parker was released on August 26, 2025, as part of final roster cuts and re-signed to the practice squad the following day. On September 2, he was released from the practice squad.

=== San Francisco 49ers (second stint) ===
On September 17, 2025, Parker signed with the San Francisco 49ers' practice squad. He signed a reserve/future contract with San Francisco on January 20, 2026.

On August 30, 2026, Parker was released by the 49ers as a part of final roster cuts.

== Personal life ==
Parker is married to Dominique Green, whom he met while attending NC A&T, and together they have a daughter. On November 18, 2017, Parker proposed to Green on the field before kickoff in Parker's final home game against arch rival North Carolina Central.

Parker's father was an All-ACC offensive lineman for the University of North Carolina and his mother a prep basketball star at Carver High School and later playing for North Carolina. Parker's older sister, Jasmine, also attended NC A&T and was a member of the women's basketball program.
