= 2015 Arkansas–Pine Bluff Golden Lions football team =

American college football season

2015 Arkansas–Pine Bluff Golden Lions football
- Conference: Southwestern Athletic Conference
- West Division
- Record: 2–9 (1–8 SWAC)
- Head coach: Monte Coleman (8th season)
- Offensive coordinator: Ted White (1st season)
- Defensive coordinator: Monte Coleman (10th season)
- Home stadium: Golden Lion Stadium

2015 Southwestern Athletic Conference football standings
	Conf.			Overall
Team	W		L	W		L
East Division
Alcorn State xy$	7	–	2	9	–	4
Alabama State *	5	–	4	6	–	5
Alabama A&M	3	–	6	3	–	8
Jackson State	3	–	6	3	–	8
Mississippi Valley State	1	–	8	1	–	10
West Division
No. 24 Grambling State xy	9	–	0	9	–	3
Prairie View A&M	8	–	1	8	–	2
Southern	6	–	3	6	–	5
Texas Southern	2	–	7	3	–	7
Arkansas–Pine Bluff	1	–	8	2	–	9
Championship: Alcorn State 49, Grambling State 21
$ – Conference champion; x – Division champion/co-champions; y – Championship game participant; * – Ineligible for postseason due to APR violations; Rankings from STATS Poll

The 2015 Arkansas–Pine Bluff Golden Lions football team represented the University of Arkansas at Pine Bluff in the 2015 NCAA Division I FCS football season. The Golden Lions were led by eighth-year head coach Monte Coleman and played their home games at Golden Lion Stadium as a member of the West Division of the Southwestern Athletic Conference (SWAC). They finished the season 2–9, 1–8 in SWAC play to finish in last place in the West Division.

== Schedule ==
Date	Time	Opponent	Site	TV	Result	Attendance
September 6	2:30 pm	vs. South Carolina State*	Orlando Citrus Bowl Stadium; Orlando, FL (MEAC/SWAC Challenge)	ESPN	L 7–35	7,257
September 12	6:00 pm	Morehouse*	Golden Lion Stadium; Pine Bluff, AR	UAPBtv	W 29–27 ^{3OT}	8,117
September 19	6:00 pm	Texas Southern	Golden Lion Stadium; Pine Bluff, AR	UAPBtv	L 20–24	6,064
September 26	1:00 pm	at Alabama A&M	Louis Crews Stadium; Huntsville, AL		L 9–28	13,674
October 3	4:00 pm	Alcorn State	Golden Lion Stadium; Pine Bluff, AR	UAPBtv	L 14–61	32,580
October 15	6:30 pm	Alabama State	Golden Lion Stadium; Pine Bluff, AR	ESPNU	L 24–31	3,783
October 24	2:00 pm	at Jackson State	Mississippi Veterans Memorial Stadium; Jackson, MS		L 3–37	39,278
October 31	1:00 pm	at Prairie View A&M	Waller ISD Football Stadium; Waller, TX	YouTube	L 29–54	1,614
November 7	2:30 pm	Southern	Golden Lion Stadium; Pine Bluff, AR	UAPBtv	L 24–57	3,464
November 14	2:30 pm	Grambling State^{†}	Golden Lion Stadium; Pine Bluff, AR	UAPBtv	L 31–49	11,437
November 21	1:00 pm	at Mississippi Valley State	Rice–Totten Field; Itta Bena, MS		W 25–19 ^{OT}	1,313
*Non-conference game; ^{†}Homecoming; All times are in Central time
