= 2015 Texas Southern Tigers football team =

American college football season

2015 Texas Southern Tigers football
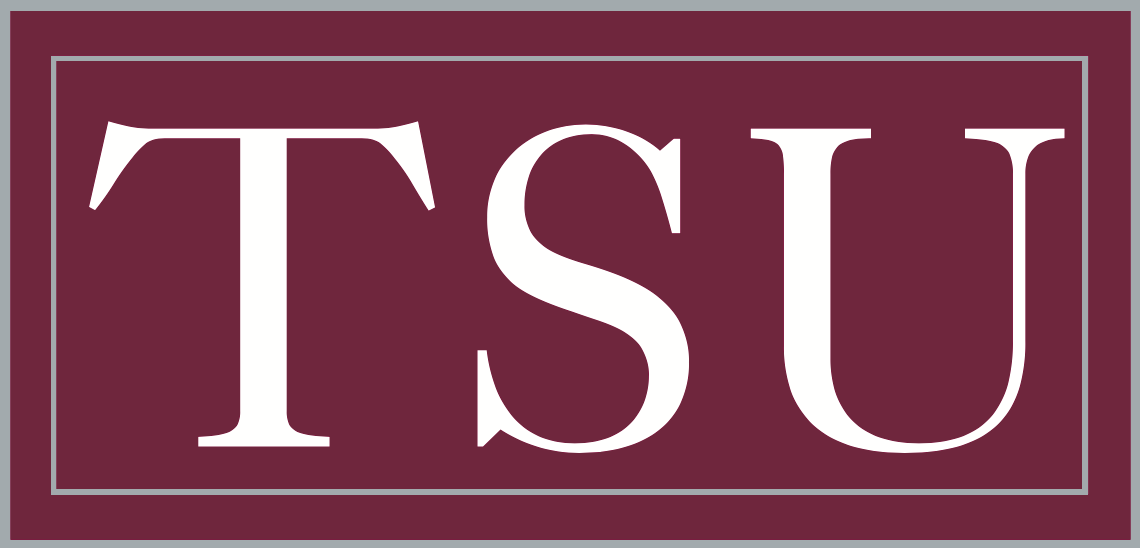
- Conference: Southwestern Athletic Conference
- West Division
- Record: 3–7 (2–7 SWAC)
- Head coach: Darrell Asberry (4th season)
- Offensive coordinator: John Shannon (1st season)
- Defensive coordinator: Heishma Northern (1st season)
- Home stadium: BBVA Compass Stadium

2015 Southwestern Athletic Conference football standings
	Conf.			Overall
Team	W		L	W		L
East Division
Alcorn State xy$	7	–	2	9	–	4
Alabama State *	5	–	4	6	–	5
Alabama A&M	3	–	6	3	–	8
Jackson State	3	–	6	3	–	8
Mississippi Valley State	1	–	8	1	–	10
West Division
No. 24 Grambling State xy	9	–	0	9	–	3
Prairie View A&M	8	–	1	8	–	2
Southern	6	–	3	6	–	5
Texas Southern	2	–	7	3	–	7
Arkansas–Pine Bluff	1	–	8	2	–	9
Championship: Alcorn State 49, Grambling State 21
$ – Conference champion; x – Division champion/co-champions; y – Championship game participant; * – Ineligible for postseason due to APR violations; Rankings from STATS Poll

The 2015 Texas Southern Tigers football team represented Texas Southern University a member of the West Division of the Southwestern Athletic Conference (SWAC) during the 2015 NCAA Division I FCS football season. Led by Darrell Asberry in his fourth and final season as head coach, the Tigers compiled an overall record of 3–7 with a mark of 2–7 in conference play, placing fourth in the SWAC's West Division. Texas Southern played home games at BBVA Compass Stadium in Houston.

On November 29, Ashberry resigned. He finished his four-year tenure at Texas Southern with a record of 12–31.

== Schedule ==
Date	Time	Opponent	Site	TV	Result	Attendance	Source
September 5	8:00 pm	Prairie View A&M	BBVA Compass Stadium; Houston, TX (Labor Day Classic)	RTSW+	L 11–38	19,075	
September 11	7:00 pm	Bacone*	BBVA Compass Stadium; Houston, TX	RTSW+	W 63–0	1,202	
September 19	6:00 pm	at Arkansas–Pine Bluff	Golden Lion Stadium; Pine Bluff, AR	UAPBtv	W 24–20	6,460	
September 26	6:00 pm	at Jackson State	Mississippi Veterans Memorial Stadium; Jackson, MS	JSUtv	L 30–34	8,517	
October 1	6:30 pm	Alabama State	BBVA Compass Stadium; Houston, TX	ESPNU	L 23–41	2,827	
October 17	2:00 pm	at Mississippi Valley State	Rice–Totten Field; Itta Bena, MS		W 49–21	4,297	
October 24	2:00 pm	Southern^{†}	BBVA Compass Stadium; Houston, TX	RTSW	L 21–40	10,127	
November 7	2:00 pm	vs. Grambling State	Independence Stadium; Shreveport, LA (Red River State Fair Classic)		L 15–41	9,868	
November 14	2:00 pm	Alcorn State	BBVA Compass Stadium; Houston, TX		L 13–65	9,868	
November 28	2:00 pm	at Alabama A&M	Louis Crews Stadium; Huntsville, AL		L 7–38	1,200	
*Non-conference game; ^{†}Homecoming
