= Detrez Newsome =

American gridiron football player (born 1994)

No. 38
- Position: Running back

Personal information
- Born: March 6, 1994 (age 32); Raeford, North Carolina, U.S.
- Listed height: 5 ft 10 in (1.78 m)
- Listed weight: 210 lb (95 kg)

Career information
- High school: Hoke County (Raeford)
- College: Western Carolina (2013–2017)
- NFL draft: 2018: undrafted

Career history
- Los Angeles Chargers (2018–2019); Ottawa Redblacks (2021)*
- * Offseason or practice squad member only

Career NFL statistics
- Rushing attempts: 11
- Rushing yards: 49
- Rushing touchdowns: 0
- Receptions: 2
- Receiving yards: 19
- Receiving touchdowns: 0
- Stats at Pro Football Reference

Jermine Detrez Newsome (born March 6, 1994) is an American former professional football player who was a running back in the National Football League (NFL). He played college football for the Western Carolina Catamounts and signed with the Los Angeles Chargers as an undrafted free agent in 2018.

== Early life ==
Newsome attended and played high school football at Hoke County High School.

== College career ==
Newsome attended and played college football at Western Carolina. Against South Carolina in the 2016 season, he had a 39-yard rushing touchdown and a 93-yard kickoff return for a touchdown.

== Professional career ==
=== Los Angeles Chargers ===
Newsome was signed by the Los Angeles Chargers as an undrafted free agent following the 2018 NFL draft. He played in the first three games of the season and recorded a single rushing attempt after making the Chargers 53-man roster, but was waived on September 24, 2018, and re-signed to the practice squad. He was promoted back to the active roster on October 20, 2018. He appeared in nine games and had 11 carries for 49 rushing yards.

On August 31, 2019, Newsome was waived by the Chargers and signed to the practice squad the next day. He was placed on the practice squad/injured list on October 15, 2019, and was released with an injury settlement the next day.

=== Ottawa Redblacks ===
Newsome signed with the Ottawa Redblacks of the CFL on December 14, 2020. He was released on July 26, 2021.
