= Earl Hilton =

American college athletics administrator

Earl M. Hilton III
Current position
- Title: Director of Intercollegiate Athletics
- Team: North Carolina A&T Aggies
- Conference: CAA

Biographical details
- Education: B.S. Lamar University; M.P.S. Texas Tech University; J.D. Texas Tech University

Administrative career (AD unless noted)
- 1993-1997: Texas Tech (Academic Counselor)
- 1997-2000: Buffalo Bulls (Asst. AD)
- 2000-2001: North Carolina A&T (Asst. AD - Compliance)
- 2001-2002: North Carolina A&T (Assoc. AD - Internal Affairs)
- 2002-2010: North Carolina A&T (Vice-Chancellor for Student Affairs)
- 2010-present: North Carolina A&T

Accomplishments and honors

Awards
- NACDA NCAA Div I AD of the Year (2018-2019)

Earl M. Hilton III is an American university sports administrator and the current Director of Intercollegiate Athletics for North Carolina Agricultural and Technical State University, an NCAA Division I sports program of located in Greensboro, North Carolina.

== Early life and education ==
Hilton received his Bachelor of Science degree in political science from Lamar University in 1992. He also earned a Master of Public Administration and Juris Doctor from Texas Tech University. Hilton also served a mission for the Church of Jesus Christ of Latter-day Saints in South Africa.

== Career ==
Hilton's career began at Texas Tech, where he served as an academic counselor. In 1997, Hilton became the assistant athletics director at the University at Buffalo, where he oversaw the departmental budget and served as the recreational and intramural supervisor. In 2000, Hilton became the assistant athletics director for compliance at North Carolina A&T. A year later, he was promoted to the position of associate athletics director for internal affairs, where he served as the finance, compliance and personnel director for the university's athletic department. Hilton spent the next eight years outside of athletics, an assistant vice chancellor for student affairs at the university. In 2010, Hilton was appointed the interim athletics director for the university, where he was later appointed to the position permanently.
