= Lonnie P. Byarm =

American football player and coach (1889–1955)

Biographical details
- Born: November 6, 1889; Union County, North Carolina, U.S.
- Died: May 6, 1955 (aged 65)

Playing career

Football
- 1910–1911: North Carolina A&M

Basketball
- 1910–1911: North Carolina A&M

Coaching career (HC unless noted)

Football
- 1924–1929: North Carolina A&T
- 1931–1933: Johnson C. Smith

Basketball
- 1930–1935: Johnson C. Smith

Head coaching record
- Overall: 30–31–9 (football)

Accomplishments and honors

Championships
- Football; 1 CIAA (1927)

Lonnie Pfundander Byarm (November 6, 1889 – May 6, 1955) was an American college football player and coach. He served as the head football coach at North Carolina A&T University from 1924 to 1929 and Johnson C. Smith University from 1931 to 1933, compiling a career college football 30–31–9.

== Head coaching record ==
=== Football ===
Year	Team	Overall	Conference	Standing	Bowl/playoffs
North Carolina A&T Aggies (Independent) (1924–1925)
1924	North Carolina A&T	4–1–4			
1925	North Carolina A&T	4–3–3			
North Carolina A&T Aggies (Colored Intercollegiate Athletic Association) (1926–1929)
1926	North Carolina A&T	7–2	5–2	3rd	
1927	North Carolina A&T	8–0	6–0	1st	
1928	North Carolina A&T	3–4–2	3–3–1	4th	
1929	North Carolina A&T	2–6	2–4	6th	
North Carolina A&T:		28–16–9	16–9–1		
Johnson C. Smith Golden Bulls (Colored Intercollegiate Athletic Association) (1931–1933)
1931	Johnson C. Smith	0–6	0–6	12th	
1932	Johnson C. Smith	1–4	0–4	T–11th	
1933	Johnson C. Smith	1–5	1–5	9th	
Johnson C. Smith:		2–15	1–15		
Total:		30–31–9			
National championship Conference title Conference division title or championship game berth
