= Charles U. DeBerry =

American football coach (1910–1969)

Biographical details
- Born: April 21, 1910; Greensboro, North Carolina, U.S.
- Died: October 11, 1969 (aged 59); Greensboro, North Carolina, U.S.

Coaching career (HC unless noted)
- 1942–1944: North Carolina A&T

Head coaching record
- Overall: 10–11

Charles Ulysses DeBerry (April 21, 1910 – October 11, 1969) was an American college football coach. He served as the head football coach at North Carolina A&T University from 1942 to 1944, compiling a record of 10–11. DeBerry was later the chair of the physical education department at Winston-Salem State University.

DeBerry attended North Carolina A&T he participated in four varsity sports: football, basketball, baseball, and track. He received his PhD degree from NYU. Dr. DeBerry served as Principal of the Bladen County Training School/Bladen Central High School in Elizabethtown, NC. He also served on the staff at Winston Salem State University. Dr. DeBerry was married to Nellie Hunter DeBerry and had one son. He died on October 11, 1969, at L. Richardson Hospital in Greensboro, North Carolina, following a short illness.

== Head coaching record ==
Year	Team	Overall	Conference	Standing	Bowl/playoffs
North Carolina A&T Aggies (Colored Intercollegiate Athletic Association) (1942–1944)
1942	North Carolina A&T	2–7	1–6	10th	
1943	North Carolina A&T	7–0	2–0	2nd	
1944	North Carolina A&T	1–4	1–3	4th	
North Carolina A&T:		10–11	4–9		
Total:		10–11			
