= 2015 Alcorn State Braves football team =

American college football season

2015 Alcorn State Braves football

SWAC champion SWAC East Division champion

SWAC Championship Game, W 49–21 vs. Grambling State

Celebration Bowl, L 34–41 vs. North Carolina A&T
- Conference: Southwestern Athletic Conference
- East Division
- Record: 9–4 (7–2 SWAC)
- Head coach: Jay Hopson (4th season)
- Defensive coordinator: Tony Pecoraro (4th season)
- Home stadium: Casem-Spinks Stadium

2015 Southwestern Athletic Conference football standings
	Conf.			Overall
Team	W		L	W		L
East Division
Alcorn State xy$	7	–	2	9	–	4
Alabama State *	5	–	4	6	–	5
Alabama A&M	3	–	6	3	–	8
Jackson State	3	–	6	3	–	8
Mississippi Valley State	1	–	8	1	–	10
West Division
No. 24 Grambling State xy	9	–	0	9	–	3
Prairie View A&M	8	–	1	8	–	2
Southern	6	–	3	6	–	5
Texas Southern	2	–	7	3	–	7
Arkansas–Pine Bluff	1	–	8	2	–	9
Championship: Alcorn State 49, Grambling State 21
$ – Conference champion; x – Division champion/co-champions; y – Championship game participant; * – Ineligible for postseason due to APR violations; Rankings from STATS Poll

The 2015 Alcorn State Braves football team represented Alcorn State University in the 2015 NCAA Division I FCS football season. The Braves were led by fourth-year head coach Jay Hopson and played their home games at Casem-Spinks Stadium. They were a member of the East Division of the Southwestern Athletic Conference (SWAC) and finished with a record of 9–4 as SWAC champions after they defeated Grambling State in the SWAC Championship Game. Alcorn State then played in the Celebration Bowl against North Carolina A&T, losing by a score of 41–34.

On January 30, 2016, head coach Jay Hopson resigned to become the head coach at Southern Miss. He finished at Alcorn State with a record of 32–17 and two SWAC championships.

== Schedule ==
Date	Time	Opponent	Site	TV	Result	Attendance
September 3	7:30 pm	at No. 16 (FBS) Georgia Tech*	Bobby Dodd Stadium; Atlanta, GA	RSN	L 6–69	49,196
September 12	6:00 pm	at Alabama State	The New ASU Stadium; Montgomery, AL		W 31–14	8,380
September 19	4:00 pm	Mississippi Valley State	Casem-Spinks Stadium; Lorman, MS		W 55–14	7,415
September 26	2:00 pm	Concordia (AL)	Casem-Spinks Stadium; Lorman, MS		W 40–7	5,993
October 3	4:00 pm	at Arkansas–Pine Bluff	Golden Lion Stadium; Pine Bluff, AR		W 61–14	32,580
October 17	2:00 pm	Grambling State^{†}	Casem-Spinks Stadium; Lorman, MS		L 34–35 ^{OT}	30,129
October 31	4:00 pm	at Southern	Ace W. Mumford Stadium; Baton Rouge, LA	CST	W 48–7	8,112
November 7	2:00 pm	Prairie View A&M	Casem-Spinks Stadium; Lorman, MS		L 34–40	5,239
November 14	1:00 pm	at Texas Southern	BBVA Compass Stadium; Houston, TX	RTSW*	W 65–13	2,145
November 21	2:00 pm	Alabama A&M	Casem-Spinks Stadium; Lorman, MS		W 44–10	2,194
November 28	2:00 pm	at Jackson State	Mississippi Veterans Memorial Stadium; Jackson, MS (Soul Bowl)		W 14–10	23,101
December 5	3:00 pm	vs. No. 21 Grambling State	NRG Stadium; Houston, TX (SWAC Championship Game)	ESPNU	W 49–21	40,352
December 19	12:00 pm	vs. No. 22 North Carolina A&T*	Georgia Dome; Atlanta, GA (Celebration Bowl)	ABC	L 34–41	35,528
*Non-conference game; ^{†}Homecoming; Rankings from STATS FCS Poll released prior to game Poll released prior to the game; All times are in Central time

- Source: Schedule

* Games will air on a tape delayed basis

== Ranking movements ==
Ranking movements Legend: ██ Increase in ranking ██ Decrease in ranking — = Not ranked RV = Received votes
	Week													
Poll	Pre	1	2	3	4	5	6	7	8	9	10	11	12	Final
STATS FCS	RV	RV	RV	RV	RV	RV	RV	RV	RV	RV	RV	RV	RV	RV
Coaches	RV	RV	RV	RV	RV	RV	RV	RV	RV	RV	—	RV	RV	RV
