= George Small (American football) =

American gridiron football player and coach (born 1956)

Current position
- Title: Head coach
- Team: Hoke County HS (NC)
- Conference: Sandhills Athletic Conference
- Record: 11–13

Biographical details
- Born: November 18, 1956 (age 69); Shreveport, Louisiana, U.S.

Playing career
- 1975–1978: North Carolina A&T
- 1980-1981: New York Giants
- 1981–1983: Calgary Stampeders
- Position: Defensive tackle

Coaching career (HC unless noted)
- 1987–1989: Langston (DC)
- 1990–1991: Savannah State (DC)
- 1992: Tulsa (DL)
- 1993: Florida A&M (DC)
- 1994: Grambling State (DC)
- 1995–2000: Kentucky State
- 2001: Youngtown State (DL)
- 2002: Hampton (asst. HC / DC)
- 2003–2005: North Carolina A&T
- 2008–2014: Florida A&M (assoc. HC / DL)
- 2018–present: Hoke County HS (NC)

Head coaching record
- Overall: 49–53 (college)
- Bowls: 3–0
- Tournaments: 0–1 (NCAA D-I-AA playoffs)

Accomplishments and honors

Championships
- 1 MEAC (2003)

Awards
- 2× SIAC Coach of the Year (1995, 1997); MEAC Coach of the Year (2003); Sandhills Athletic Conference Coach of the Year (2019)

George Michael Small (born November 18, 1956) is an American gridiron football coach and former player. He served as the head football coach at Kentucky State University from 1995 to 2000 and at North Carolina Agricultural and Technical State University from 2003 to 2005, compiling a career college football record of 49–53. Small played professionally with the New York Giants of the National Football League (NFL) in 1980 and the Calgary Stampeders of the Canadian Football League (CFL) from 1981 to 1983.

== Playing career ==
Small attended Hoke County High School in Raeford, North Carolina. He then played collegiately at North Carolina A&T. Small then played professionally with the New York Giants of the National Football League (NFL) in 1980 and the Calgary Stampeders of the Canadian Football League (CFL) from 1981 to 1983.

== Coaching career ==
Small was the 25th head football coach at Kentucky State University in Frankfort, Kentucky and he held that position for six seasons, from 1995 until 2000. His career coaching record at Kentucky State was 33–34. Small went on to serve as head football coach at his alma mater from 2003 to 2005. He led the Aggies to the NCAA Division I-AA playoffs in 2003. His record at NC A&T was 16–19.

== Head coaching record ==
=== College ===
Year	Team	Overall	Conference	Standing	Bowl/playoffs	TSN^{#}	Coaches^{°}
Kentucky State Thorobreds (Southern Intercollegiate Athletic Conference) (1995–2000)
1995	Kentucky State	7–4	0–0	NA			
1996	Kentucky State	5–6	3–3	T–2nd			
1997	Kentucky State	7–5	4–2	T–2nd	W Pioneer		
1998	Kentucky State	5–6	4–2	T–4th			
1999	Kentucky State	5–6	4–2	T–3rd			
2000	Kentucky State	4–7	1–6	8th			
Kentucky State:		33–34	16–15				
North Carolina A&T Aggies (Mid-Eastern Athletic Conference) (2003–2005)
2003	North Carolina A&T	10–3	6–1	1st	L NCAA Division I-AA First Round	16	16
2004	North Carolina A&T	3–8	1–6	T–7th			
2005	North Carolina A&T	3–8	2–5	6th			
North Carolina A&T:		16–19	9–12				
Total:		49–53					
National championship Conference title Conference division title or championship game berth
