= 2017 Celebration Bowl =

- 3rd Celebration Bowl
Grambling State Tigers	North Carolina A&T Aggies
(11–1)	(11–0)
SWAC	MEAC
14	21
Head coach: Broderick Fobbs	Head coach: Rod Broadway
STATS 13	STATS 7
	1	2	3	4	Total
Grambling State	0	7	0	7	14
North Carolina A&T	0	7	7	7	21
- Date: December 16, 2017
- Season: 2017
- Stadium: Mercedes-Benz Stadium
- Location: Atlanta, Georgia
- MVP: Offense: #22 RB Marquell Cartwright, NC A&T; Defense: #29 CB Franklin "Mac" McCain III, NC A&T
- Favorite: North Carolina A&T (by 9.5 pts)
- National anthem: Jekalyn Carr
- Referee: Jay Edwards (C-USA)
- Halftime show: Blue and Gold Marching Machine; GSU Tiger Marching Band
- Attendance: 25,873
- Payout: US$1,000,000 (Per Conference)

United States TV coverage
- Network: ABC; RedVoice, LLC
- Announcers: Mark Neely, Jay Walker, & Tiffany Greene (ABC); Sam Crenshaw, Randy McMichael, & Lericia Harris (RedVoice)
- Nielsen ratings: 1.59 (Viewers)

The 2017 Celebration Bowl was a post-season American college football bowl game that was played on December 16, 2017 at the Mercedes-Benz Stadium in Atlanta, Georgia. This third Celebration Bowl game matched the champion of the Mid-Eastern Athletic Conference, against the champion of the Southwestern Athletic Conference, the two historically black division I conferences. The event was the finale of the 2017 FCS football season for both conferences as neither had teams earn an at large selections into the NCAA Division I FCS football playoffs and their champions abstain from the tournament.

The game kicked off at 12:00 PM (EST) and was televised live on ABC, as the kickoff game to the 2017 Bowl season. ESPN Events was the organizer of the game, while the 100 Black Men of Atlanta managed the game's ancillary events. The #7th ranked North Carolina A&T Aggies won the game, beating #13th ranked Grambling State Tigers by the score of 21–14, claiming the 2017 black college football national championship

== Teams ==
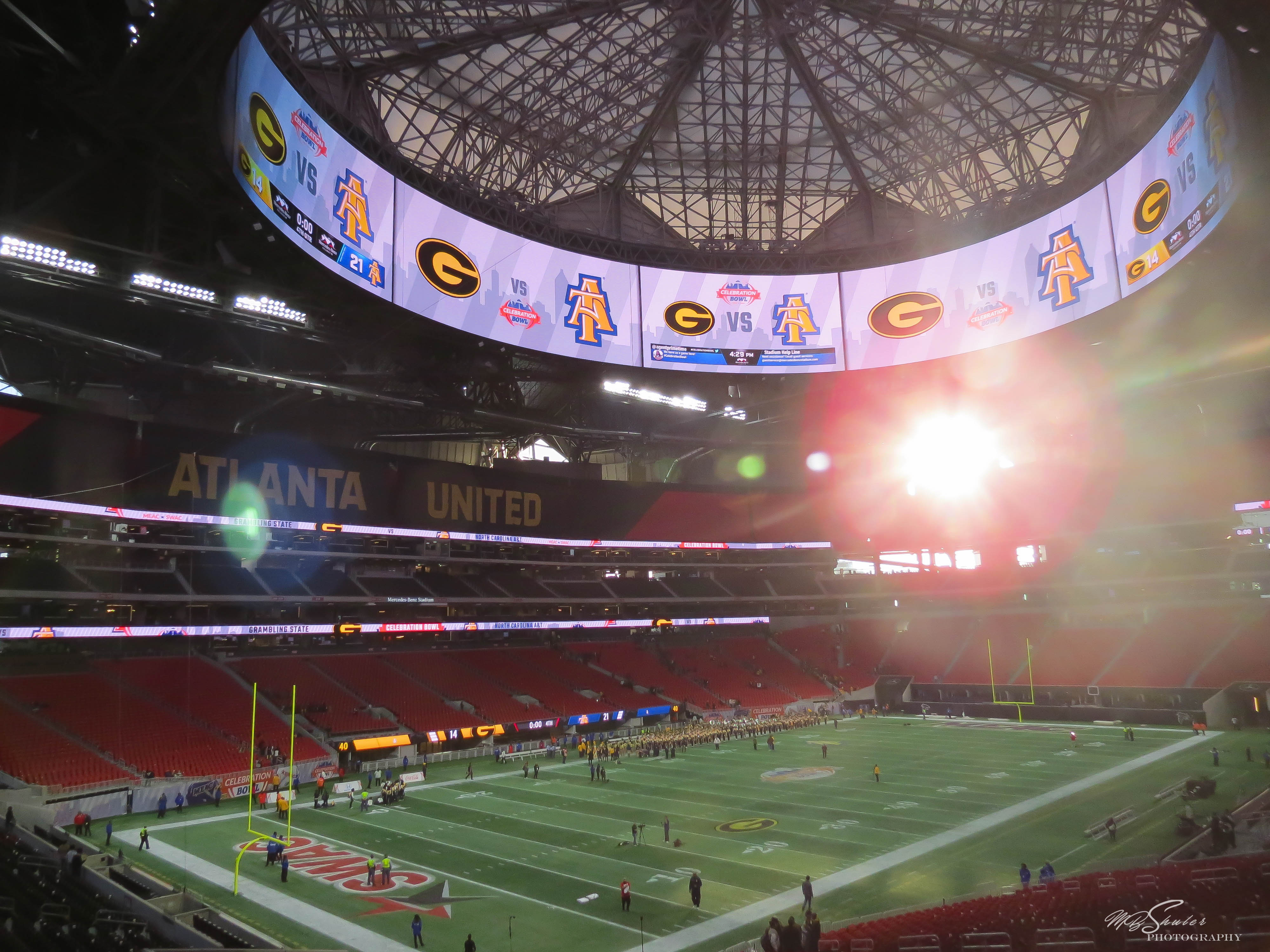
2017 Celebration Bowl

The participants for the game are based upon the final regular season standings which determine the MEAC football champion and the SWAC football championship Game determining the SWAC representative. The MEAC representative was announced on November 13, 2017, after the North Carolina A&T Aggies clenched the MEAC Championship after defeating the Savannah State Tigers. The SWAC representative will be announced at the conclusion of the SWAC Football Championship Game which matched the top teams from the conferences' eastern and western divisions.

=== North Carolina A&T Aggies ===
The North Carolina A&T Aggies officially accepted their Celebration Bowl invitation after defeating their arch-rival North Carolina Central at the conclusion of their 2017 regular season. A&T earned their bowl invitation by going on an 11–0 undefeated regular season campaign, with key victories over in-state FBS Charlotte; perennial conference contenders Bethune–Cookman and arch rival North Carolina Central. This will be the second Celebration Bowl for North Carolina A&T, following the Aggies victory over the Alcorn State Braves in the 2015 Celebration Bowl 41–34.

=== Grambling State Tigers ===
The Grambling State Tigers accepted their Celebration Bowl invitation at the conclusion of the 2017 SWAC Championship game, where they defeated Alcorn State 40–32. The Tigers went 11–1 and 8–0 in conference with key victories over in-state FCS opponent Northwestern State and arch rival Southern in the 2017 Bayou Classic. Grambling's lone regular season loss came at the hands of In-state FBS Tulane. This will be the second Celebration Bowl for Grambling, following their victory over the North Carolina Central in the 2016 Celebration Bowl.

== Pregame buildup ==
Pregame media coverage of the game focused the similarities between Grambling and North Carolina A&T, and the shared history between the two programs. Both the A&T and Grambling are previous Celebration Bowl champions and the last two HBCU national champions, with A&T winning the inaugural game in 2015 and Grambling winning in 2016. Head Coach Broadway left Grambling for A&T in 2011 after coaching the Tigers to a 35–12 record with 3 division titles and a SWAC championship over the course of 4 seasons. Fobbs' ties to A&T are through his father Lee Fobbs, who coached the Aggies from 2006–2008. During Lee Fobbs' tenure, the team endured a 2–28 record, including a 27-game losing streak. Before the arrival of both Broadway and Fobbs to their respective teams, both programs experienced poor performances. Before Rod Broadway became the head coach of North Carolina A&T, the Aggies had come off of a 1–10 season. Since his first season, A&T have won 57 games including owning at least a share of 3 MEAC championships. Brodrick Fobbs became the head coach of Grambling following a 1–11 2013 which saw a players boycott that garnered national media attention. In the last 4 seasons, Fobbs has coached the Tigers to 39 victories, including 2 SWAC championships and 3 SWAC western division titles.

Media outlets also noted how statistically similar both teams are. Both the Aggies and Tigers are led by quarterbacks who won their conference's Offensive Player of the Year awards. A&T's Lamar Raynard has recorded a season total 2,875 yards with 29 touchdowns and 5 interceptions, while Grambling's DeVante Kincade has similar statistics with 2,697 total yards with 23 touchdowns and only 3 interceptions. On offense, the Aggies average 36.4 points and 429 yards per game, while the Tigers record 32.7 points and 374 yards per game. Defensively, A&T is 4th in Division I FCS only giving up an average of 251.4 yards a game, while Grambling gives up 331 yards per game. Grambling ranks at the top of the FCS with 47 team sacks and are 2nd in FCS with a plus 21 turnover margin. A&T's stats are similar with 35 team sacks and are immediately following Grambling with a plus-16 turnover margin. In regards to defensive touchdowns, Grambling have a total 4 on the season, with A&T recording 5. The two teams most significant difference is in the number of offensive touchdowns allowed by their opponents. A&T's defensive corp, which is ranked 3rd in all of FCS, gives up an average 12.3 points per game, and only given up 15 touchdowns in the 11 games played this season. For Grambling, they have allowed 20.4 points per game and 30 offensive touchdowns this season.

== Game summary ==
=== Scoring summary ===
Scoring summary

Quarter	Time	Drive			Team	Scoring information	Score	
Quarter	Time	Plays	Yards	TOP	Team	Scoring information	Grambling	NCAT
2	4:58	5	25	2:24	NCAT	Marquell Cartwright 11-yard touchdown reception from Lamar Raynard, Noel Ruiz kick good	0	7
2	0:43	8	70	2:22	Grambling	Jordan Jones 2-yard touchdown reception from Devante Kincaide, Marc Orozco kick good	7	7
3	7:36	7	80	3:50	NCAT	Marquell Cartwright 29-yard touchdown run, Noel Ruiz kick good	7	14
4	14:16	7	80	2:19	Grambling	Martez Carter 29-yard touchdown reception from Devante Kincaide, Marc Orozco kick good	14	14
4	0:38	7	56	1:04	NCAT	Lamar Raynard 1-yard touchdown run, Noel Ruiz kick good	14	21
"TOP" = time of possession. For other American football terms, see Glossary of American football.							14	21

=== Statistics ===
Statistics	Grambling	NCAT
First downs	17	23
Total offense, plays – yards	63–336	80–397
Rushes-yards (net)	27–111 (4.1)	360–160 (4.4)
Passing yards (net)	225	237
Passes, Comp-Att-Int	19–36–1	24–44–2
Time of Possession	24:37	35:23

A&T's Running Back Marquell Cartwright and Cornerback Franklin "Mac" McCain III were named offensive and defensive most valuable players. Cartwright recorded 110 yards rushing on 20 attempts and 54 receiving yards on 3 catches. Cartwright's efforts resulted in 2 Touchdowns for the Aggies. McCain recorded 4 tackles and a second-half interception at the Grambling goal line.

== Related events ==
Source: ESPN

- Team Introduction Press Conference, December 7, 2017
- College Football Awards Show presented by Home Depot, December 7, 2017
- MEAC Women in Athletics Professional Workshop, December 11–12, 2017
- NFL Breakfast & Career Panel, December 14, 2017
- Champions Circle, December 14, 2017
- NFL Career Forum, December 15, 2017
- The Celebration Bowl Trophy Tour, December 16. 2017
- Celebration Bowl Fan Fest, December 16, 2017
- Celebration Bowl 5th Quarter, December 16, 2017
