= 2016 Jackson State Tigers football team =

American college football season

2016 Jackson State Tigers football
- Conference: Southwestern Athletic Conference
- East Division
- Record: 3–8 (3–6 SWAC)
- Head coach: Tony Hughes (1st season)
- Offensive coordinator: Chad Germany (1st season)
- Offensive scheme: Spread
- Defensive coordinator: John Hendrick (1st season)
- Base defense: 3–4
- Home stadium: Mississippi Veterans Memorial Stadium

2016 Southwestern Athletic Conference football standings
| | Conf. | | | Overall |
| Team | W | | L | W | | L |
|---|---|---|---|---|---|---|
East Division
| Alcorn State xy | 5 | – | 4 | 5 | – | 6 |
| Alabama A&M | 4 | – | 5 | 4 | – | 7 |
| Alabama State | 3 | – | 6 | 4 | – | 7 |
| Jackson State | 3 | – | 6 | 3 | – | 8 |
| Mississippi Valley State | 1 | – | 8 | 1 | – | 10 |
West Division
| No. 16 Grambling State xy$ | 9 | – | 0 | 12 | – | 1 |
| Southern * | 8 | – | 1 | 8 | – | 3 |
| Prairie View A&M | 7 | – | 2 | 7 | – | 4 |
| Texas Southern | 4 | – | 5 | 4 | – | 7 |
| Arkansas–Pine Bluff | 1 | – | 8 | 1 | – | 10 |
Championship: Grambling State 27, Alcorn State 20
$ – Conference champion; x – Division champion/co-champions; y – Championship game participant; * – ineligible for postseason due to APR violations; Rankings from STATS Poll

The 2016 Jackson State Tigers football team represented Jackson State University in the 2016 NCAA Division I FCS football season. The Tigers were led by first-year head coach Tony Hughes. They played their home games at Mississippi Veterans Memorial Stadium. They were a member of the East Division of the Southwestern Athletic Conference. They finished the season 3–8 overall and 3–6 in SWAC play to tie for third place in the East Division.

== Schedule ==
| Date | Time | Opponent | Site | TV | Result | Attendance |
|---|---|---|---|---|---|---|
| September 1 | 9:00 pm | at UNLV* | Sam Boyd Stadium; Whitney, NV | CI | L 13–63 | 18,575 |
| September 10 | 6:00 pm | vs. Tennessee State* | Liberty Bowl Memorial Stadium; Memphis, TN (Southern Heritage Classic) | FSS | L 26–40 | 46,263 |
| September 17 | 6:00 pm | Grambling State | Mississippi Veterans Memorial Stadium; Jackson, MS | ESPN3 | L 14–35 | 13,890 |
| September 24 | 4:00 pm | Arkansas–Pine Bluff | Golden Lion Stadium; Pine Bluff, AR | | W 32–20 | 14,501 |
| October 1 | 6:00 pm | Mississippi Valley State | Mississippi Veterans Memorial Stadium; Jackson, MS | | W 16–14 | 18,023 |
| October 15 | 6:00 pm | Southern | Mississippi Veterans Memorial Stadium; Jackson, MS (Boombox Classic) | CST | L 24–28 | 33,210 |
| October 22 | 2:00 pm | at Texas Southern | BBVA Compass Stadium; Houston, TX | RSSW | W 21–13 | 10,121 |
| October 29 | 2:00 pm | Prairie View A&M^{†} | Mississippi Veterans Memorial Stadium; Jackson, MS | CST | L 14–28 | 26,215 |
| November 5 | 2:00 pm | at Alabama State | The New ASU Stadium; Montgomery, AL | | L 7–14 | 7,823 |
| November 12 | 2:00 pm | Alabama A&M | Mississippi Veterans Memorial Stadium; Jackson, MS (Soul Bowl) | | L 20–27 | 6,960 |
| November 19 | 2:00 pm | at Alcorn State | Casem-Spinks Stadium; Lorman, MS | | L 16–35 | 27,297 |
*Non-conference game; ^{†}Homecoming; All times are in Central time
