= Yulman Stadium =

Football stadium at Tulane University

Benson Field at Yulman Stadium
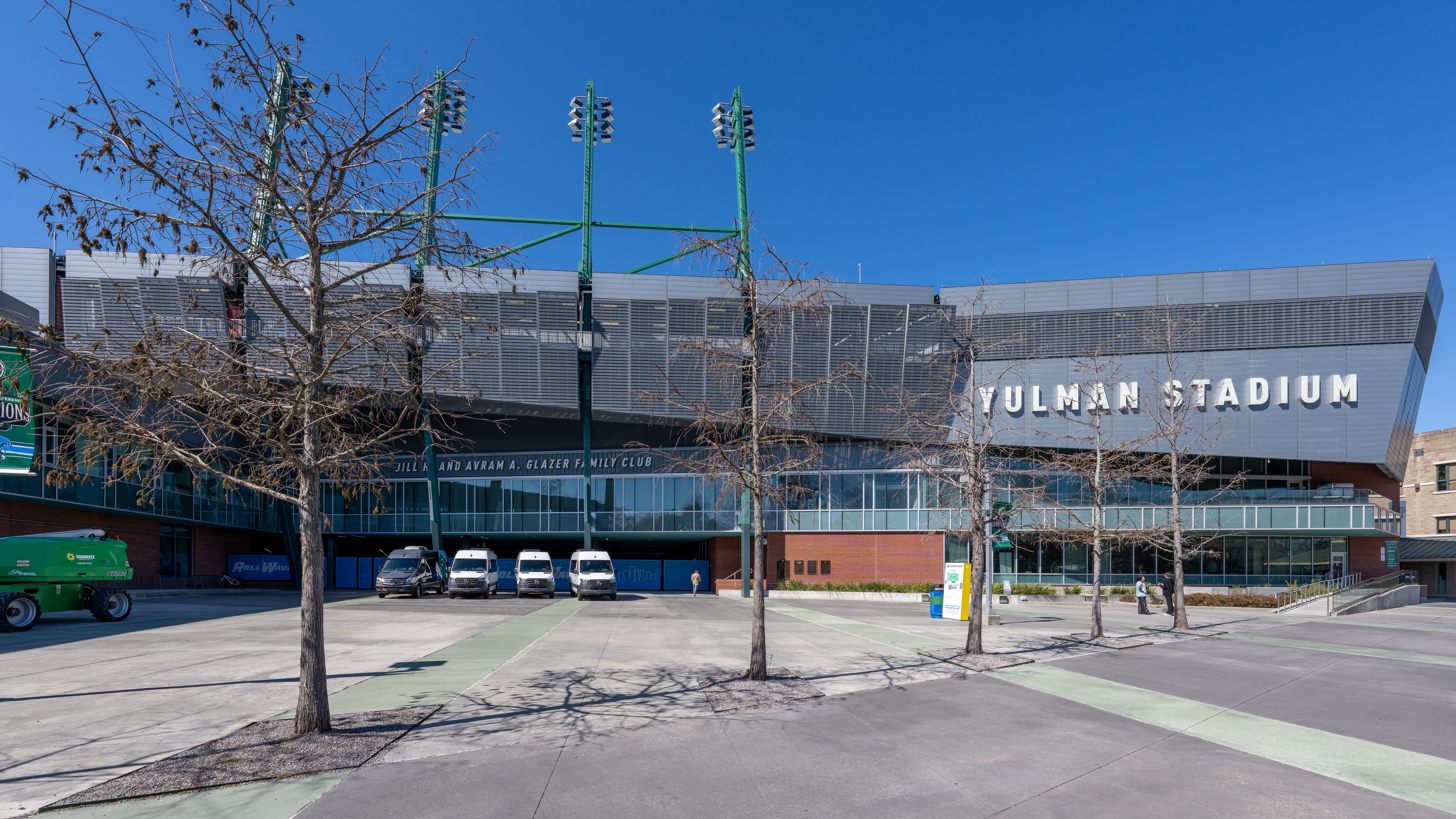
- A view from outside the stadium (2026)

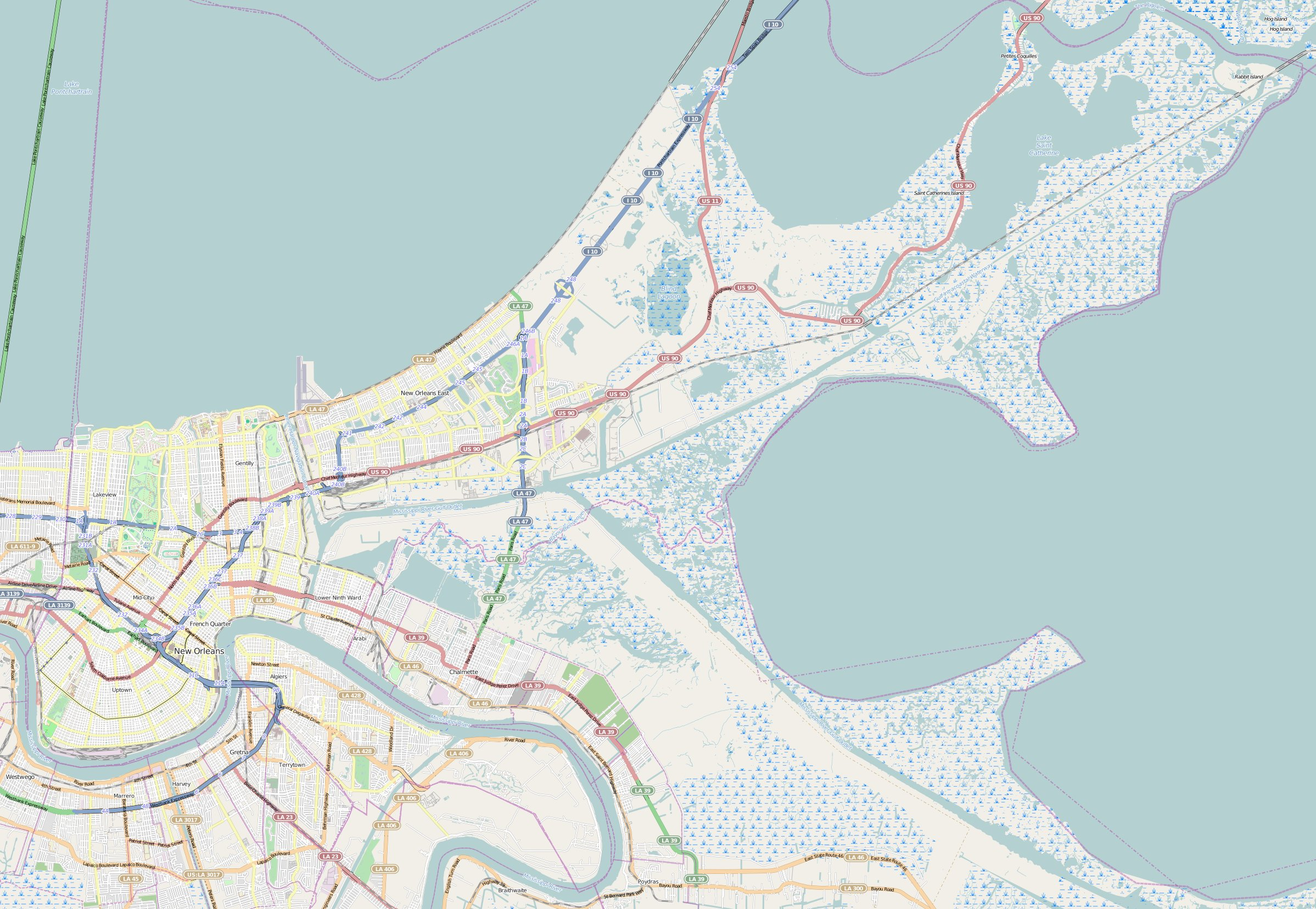
- Location in New Orleans Location in Louisiana Location in the United States
- Full name: Benson Field at Yulman Stadium
- Location: Ben Weiner Drive; New Orleans, LA 70118
- Coordinates: 29°56′41″N 90°07′01″W
- Owner: Tulane University
- Operator: ASM Global
- Capacity: 30,000
- Executive suites: 4,500 club seats
- Surface: Hellas Matrix Turf

Construction
- Groundbreaking: January 28, 2013
- Opened: September 6, 2014
- Cost: $75 million ($102 million in 2025 dollars)
- Architects: Gould Evans & Associates; Lee Ledbetter & Associates
- Structural engineer: Thornton Tomasetti
- Services engineer: MCC Group
- General contractor: Woodward Design+Build

Tenant
- Tulane Green Wave football (NCAA) (2014–present)

Website
- tulanegreenwave.com

Yulman Stadium is the on-campus venue for football at Tulane University in New Orleans, Louisiana. It currently has a capacity of 30,000 spectators, with 4,500 premium seats in two fan clubs – the Westfeldt Terrace and the Jill H. and Avram A. Glazer Family Club. The stadium's first game and grand opening was the 2014 season's home opener against its former Southern Conference and Southeastern Conference foe Georgia Tech on September 6, 2014.

Yulman replaced the Superdome as the home stadium of Tulane Green Wave football after 39 seasons at that venue, and it is situated on the university's Uptown campus between the Tulane baseball team's Turchin Stadium and the former site of Tulane's last on-campus football stadium, Tulane Stadium.

== Stadium features ==
The stadium features two elevated club decks on the home side. The Jill H. and Avram A. Glazer Family Club is the premier club-level seating in the stadium, with 1,500 chair back seats, two club rooms, two bars, expanded concessions, and a large meeting space. The remainder of Yulman's premium seating is composed of 3,000 chair back seats in the Westfeldt Terrace, located directly above the Glazer Club and covered by a canopy. Westfeldt features a panoramic view of the New Orleans skyline and premium concessions, including traditional New Orleans dishes.

A large-scale meeting space is located on the ground level for use year-round. The entry space in front of the stadium, known as the Athletes Plaza, is used for pre- and post-game activities. Yulman holds a 94-by-24-foot LED video board, as well as two ribbon displays, all made by Daktronics. Barry Kern from Mardi Gras World created a float for use during pre-game parades, as well as a mural inside the Glazer Club.

=== Stadium updates ===
Yulman was designed and constructed with the ability to expand in the future should demand dictate it, specifically with 5,000–10,000 seats in the east sideline and north end zone (Glazer/Westfeldt side and Wilson end zone, respectively).

Prior to the 2016 season, Tulane Athletic Director Troy Dannen announced the addition of a 2,400-pound (1,100 kg) sculpture of the program's classic "Angry Wave" to the top of the scoreboard. Installed during the 2017 season and located above the student section and produced by Mardi Gras World, the sculpture doubles as a water feature, though details of that aspect were not announced. The Angry Wave—made of fiberglass and steel—weighs 3,353 pounds (1,521 kg) and is 14 feet 7 inches (4.45 m) tall and 20 feet 9 inches (6.32 m) wide.

== History ==
For some time, Tulane fans had felt chagrin at playing games at the Superdome. The stadium seated over 75,000 people for football, but the Green Wave struggled to attract even 40,000 people in their best years, in part because students and faculty had to travel off campus to the stadium. As a result, Green Wave football games were often swallowed up by the environment.

University representatives initially named the stadium "Tulane Community Stadium" but revealed its official name in late 2012. Richard Yulman, the former chair/owner of Serta and a member of the Board of Tulane, and his wife donated $15 million toward construction of the project, gaining naming rights to the stadium in the process. He later committed another $10 million to the project as a challenge to other donors to completely fund the project through private donations by the end of the first football season in the stadium. The stadium’s playing surface was named Benson Field after New Orleans Saints and New Orleans Pelicans owner Tom Benson and his wife Gayle, who jointly donated $7.5 million from the Gayle and Tom Benson Charitable Foundation.

Construction Photos, February 2014

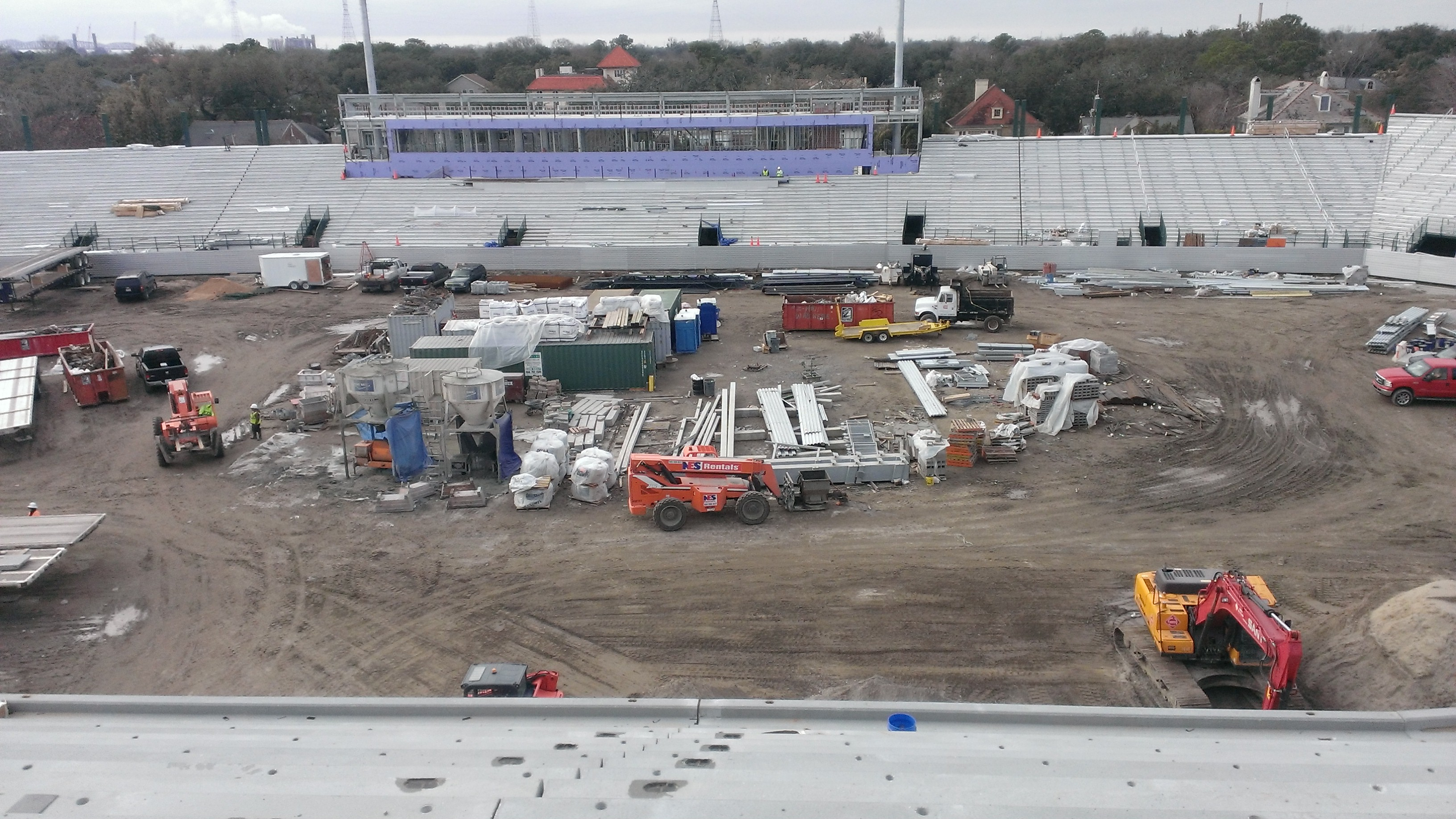
View from Westfeldt Terrace

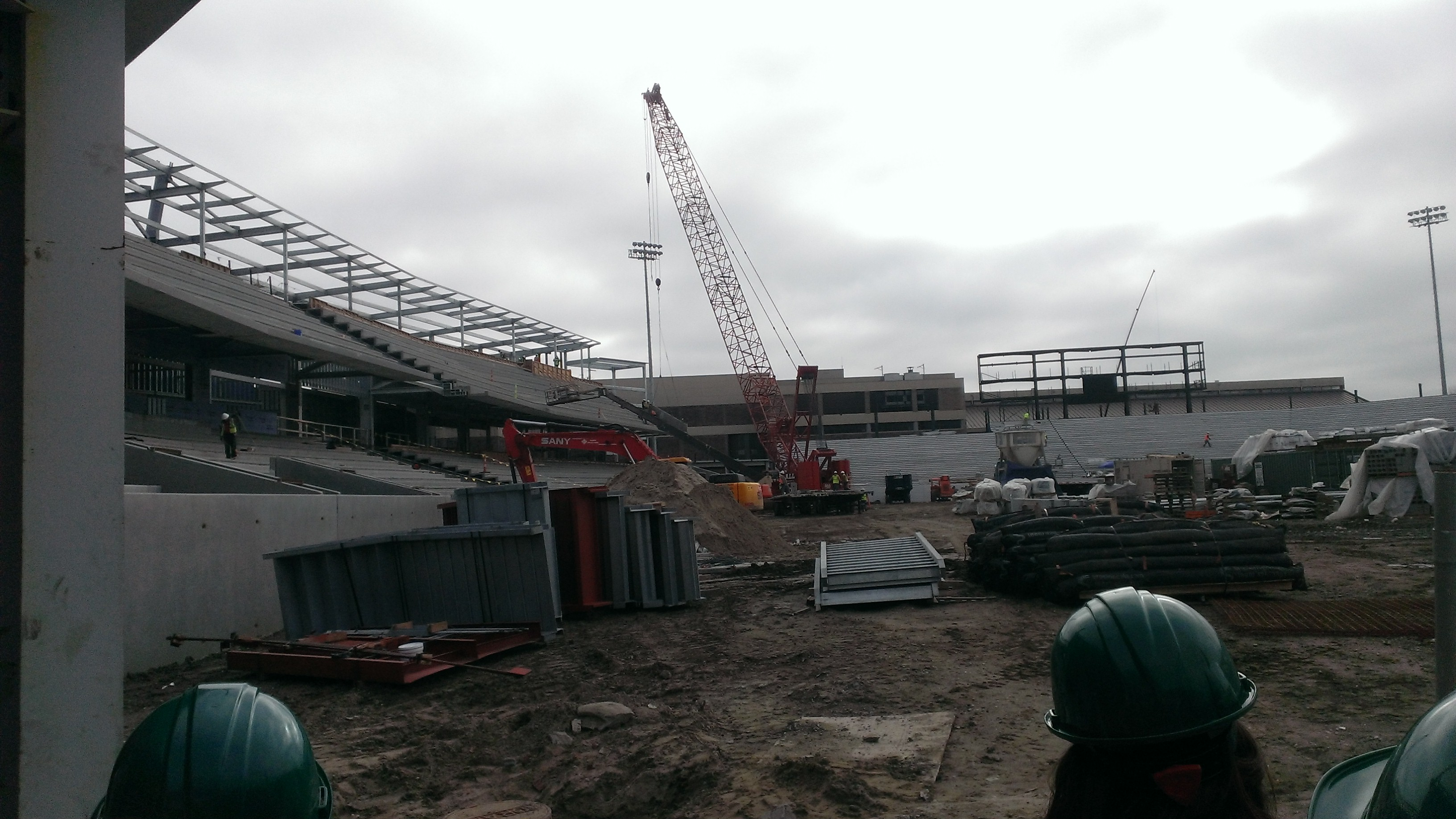
Home side & student section

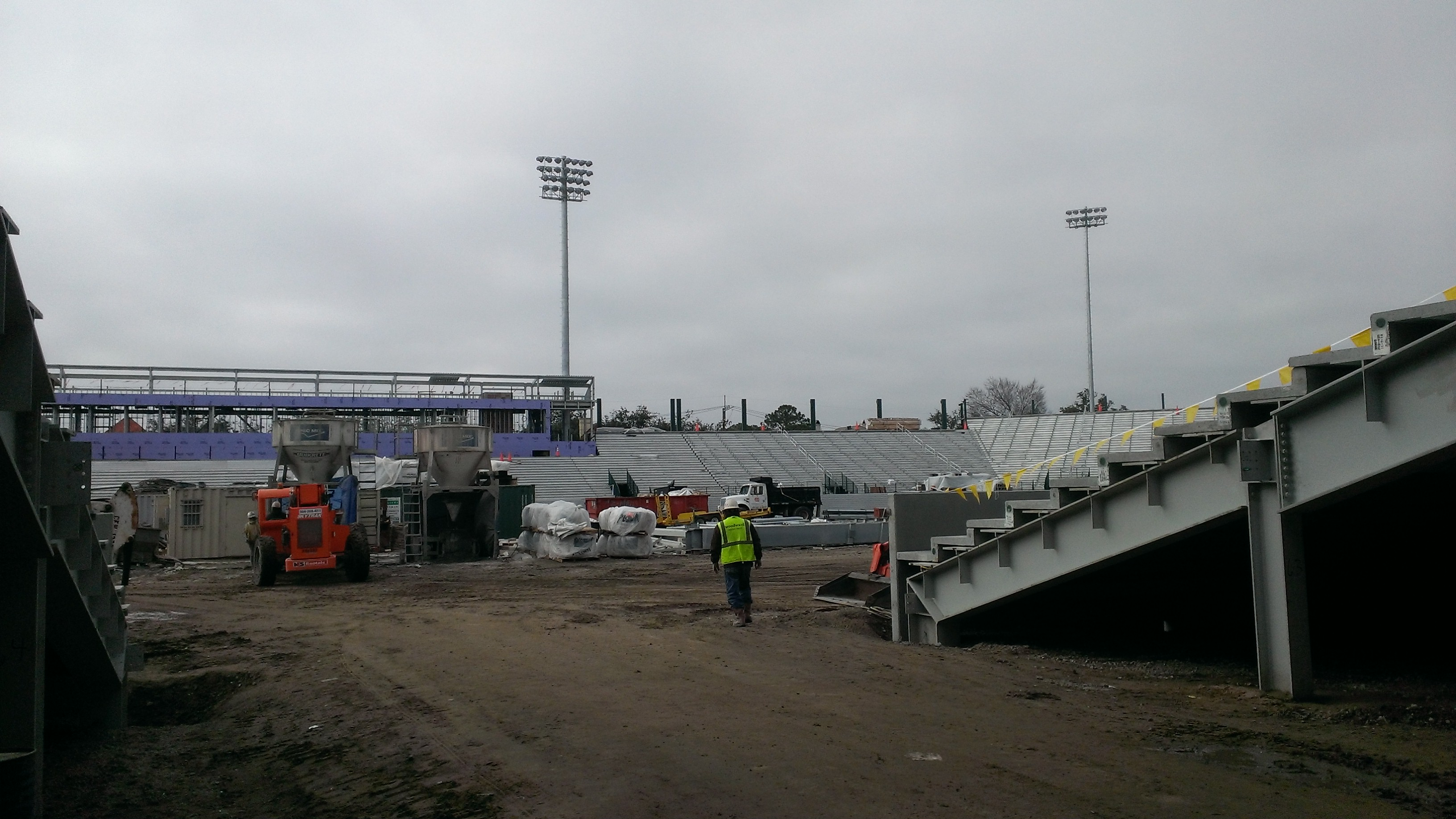
Visitors' side & press box

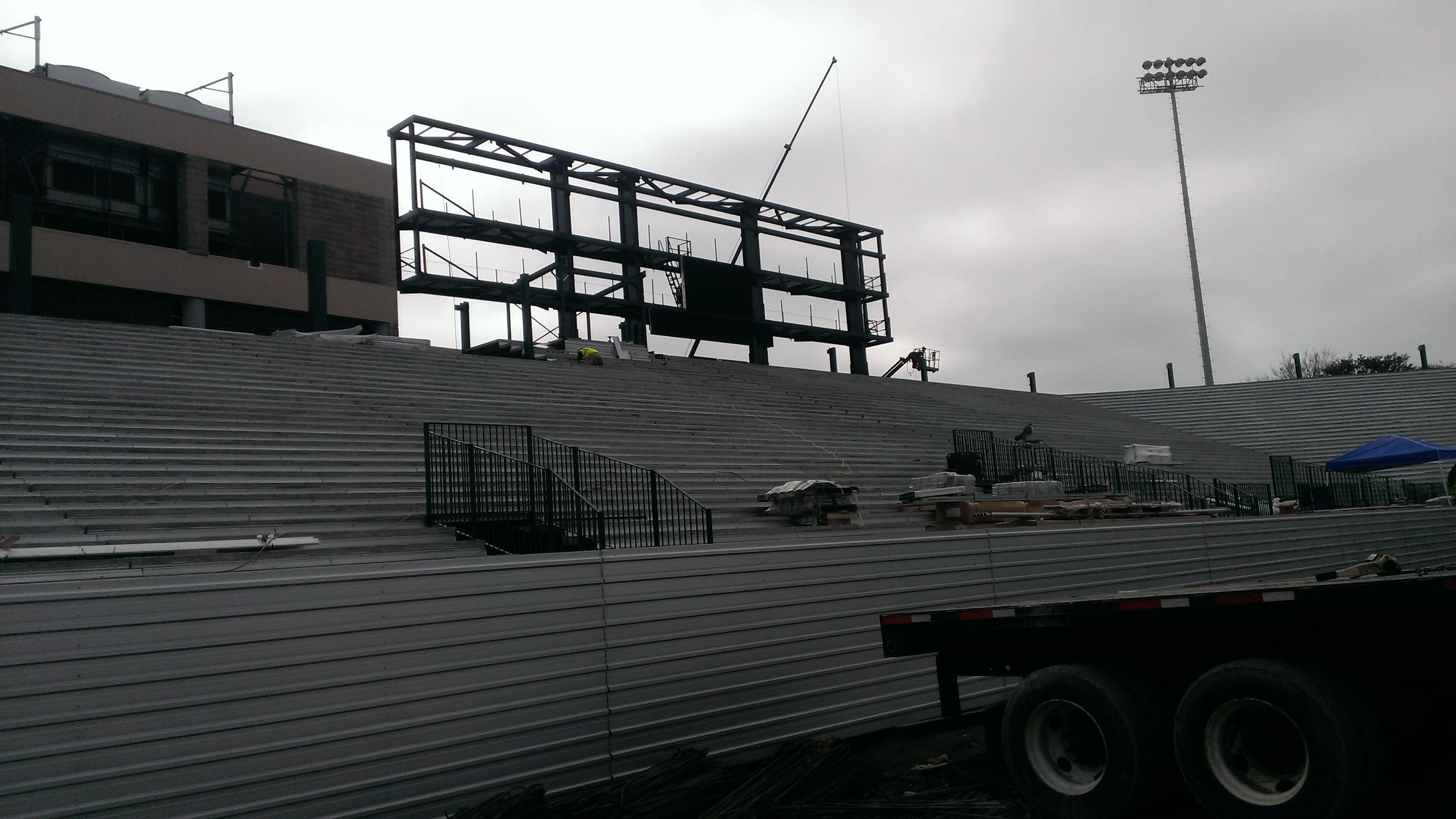
Student section & video board

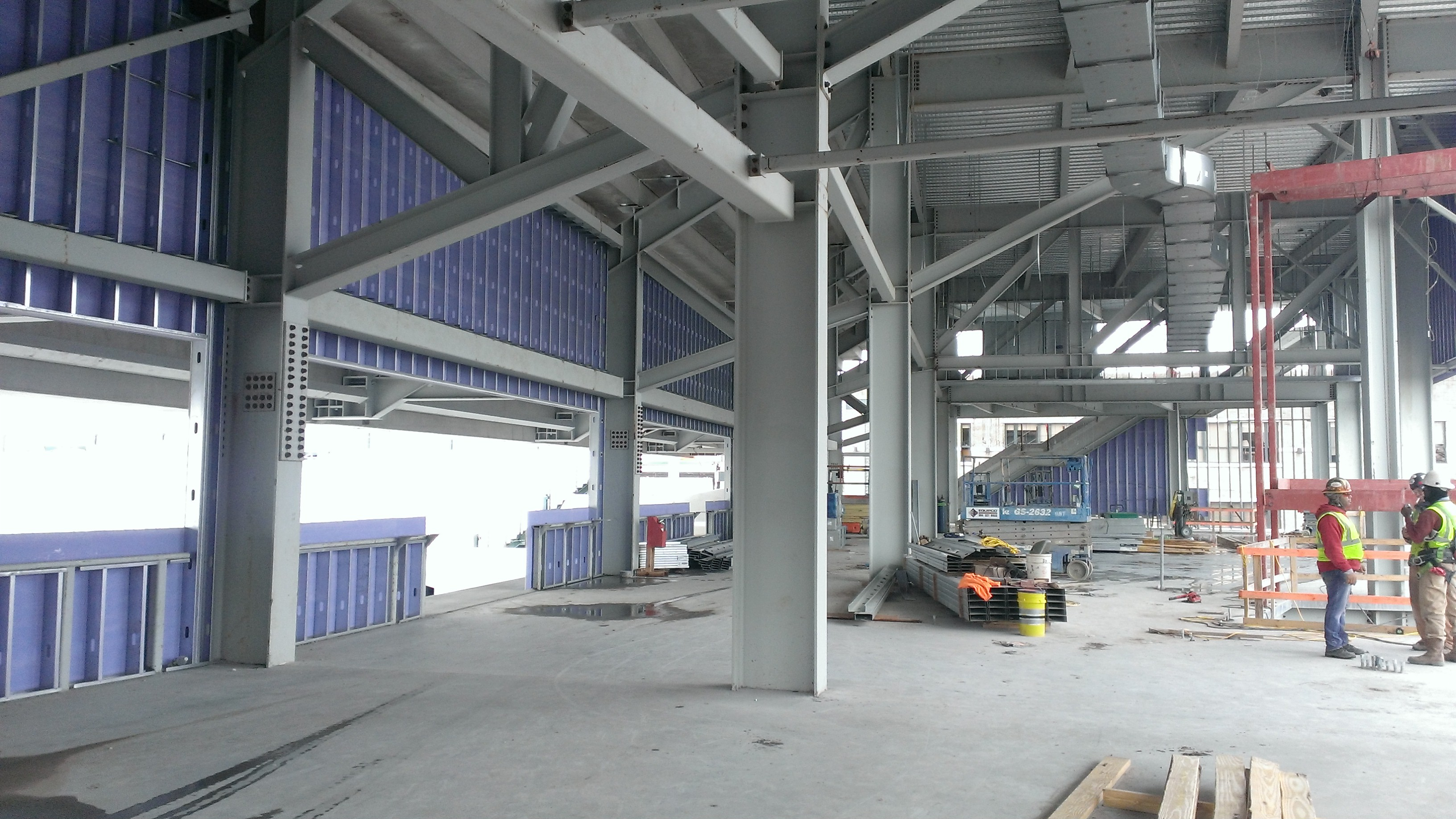
Glazer Family Club

In its first game in Yulman Stadium, Tulane played the Georgia Tech Yellow Jackets in front of a university-reported crowd of 30,000 spectators. The opening game sold out 14 minutes after single-game tickets went on sale, and students picked up roughly 5,000 tickets for the game (about 40% of the entire undergraduate and graduate enrollment of the university), making it the largest student crowd at a Tulane game since football moved off campus in 1975.

=== Attendance records ===
Rankings are from the AP poll.

| Rank | Attendance | Opponent | Date | Result |
|---|---|---|---|---|
| 1 | 30,118 | #22 UCF | December 3, 2022 | W 45–28 |
| 2 | 30,100 | Memphis | October 22, 2022 | W 38–28 |
| 3 | 30,000 | Georgia Tech | September 6, 2014 | L 21–38 |
| 3 | 30,000 | #20 Ole Miss | September 9, 2023 | L 20–37 |
| 3 | 30,000 | North Texas | October 21, 2023 | W 35–28 |
| 3 | 30,000 | Temple | November 9, 2024 | W 52–6 |
| 3 | 30,000 | Duke | September 13, 2025 | W 34–27 |
| 3 | 30,000 | Florida Atlantic | November 15, 2025 | W 35–24 |
| 9 | 28,614 | Memphis | November 15, 2014 | L 7–38 |
| 10 | 27,417 | Tulsa | November 3, 2019 | W 38–26 |
| 11 | 27,317 | #22 UCF | November 12, 2022 | L 31–38 |
| 12 | 27,179 | Southern | September 10, 2016 | W 66–21 |
All-time record in Yulman: 43–29 (.597)

Attendance and record through November 15, 2025

== Other events ==
Yulman Stadium hosted its first high school football game on September 8, 2017 when New Orleans Catholic schools De La Salle and St. Augustine played. It was the first prep contest on the Tulane campus since November 3, 1979, when Chalmette defeated Jesuit 23–9 at Tulane Stadium.

Yulman hosted its first Louisiana High School Athletic Association state championship game on December 6, 2019, when Archbishop Rummel defeated Baton Rouge Catholic 17–14 for the Division I select title. The stadium hosted two LHSAA select championship games on December 4, 2021: Baton Rouge Catholic vs. Jesuit and Lafayette Christian vs. St. Charles Catholic.

== Gallery ==
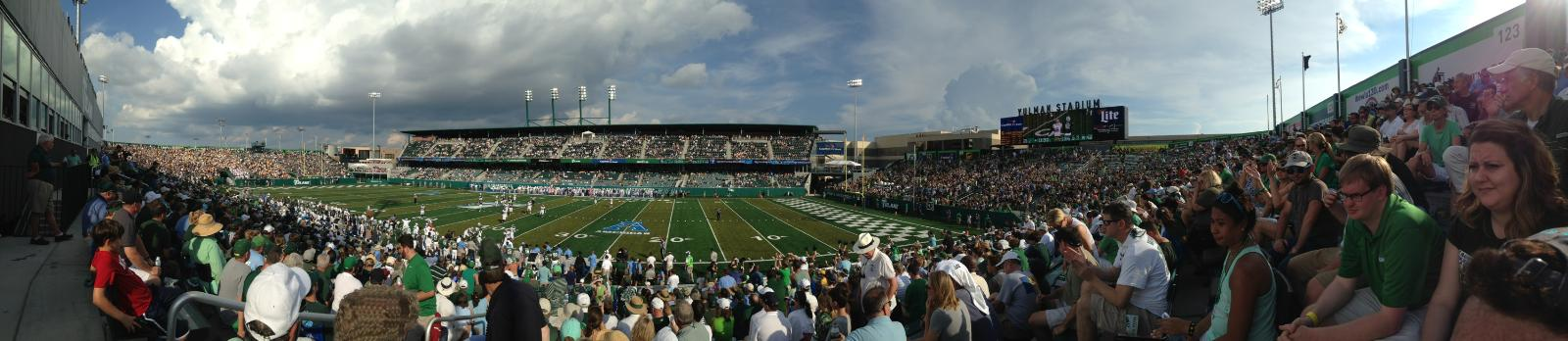
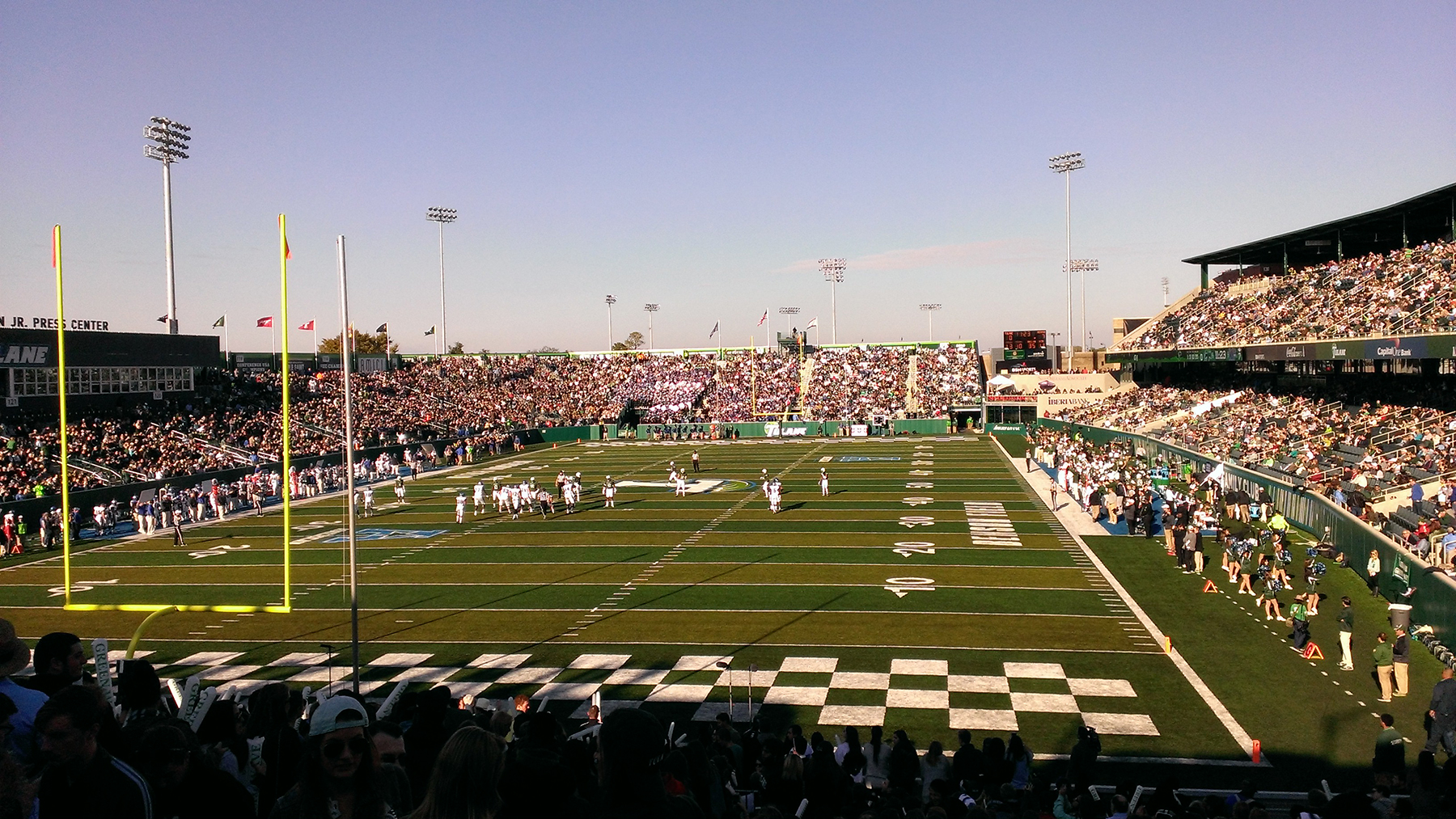
View from End zone

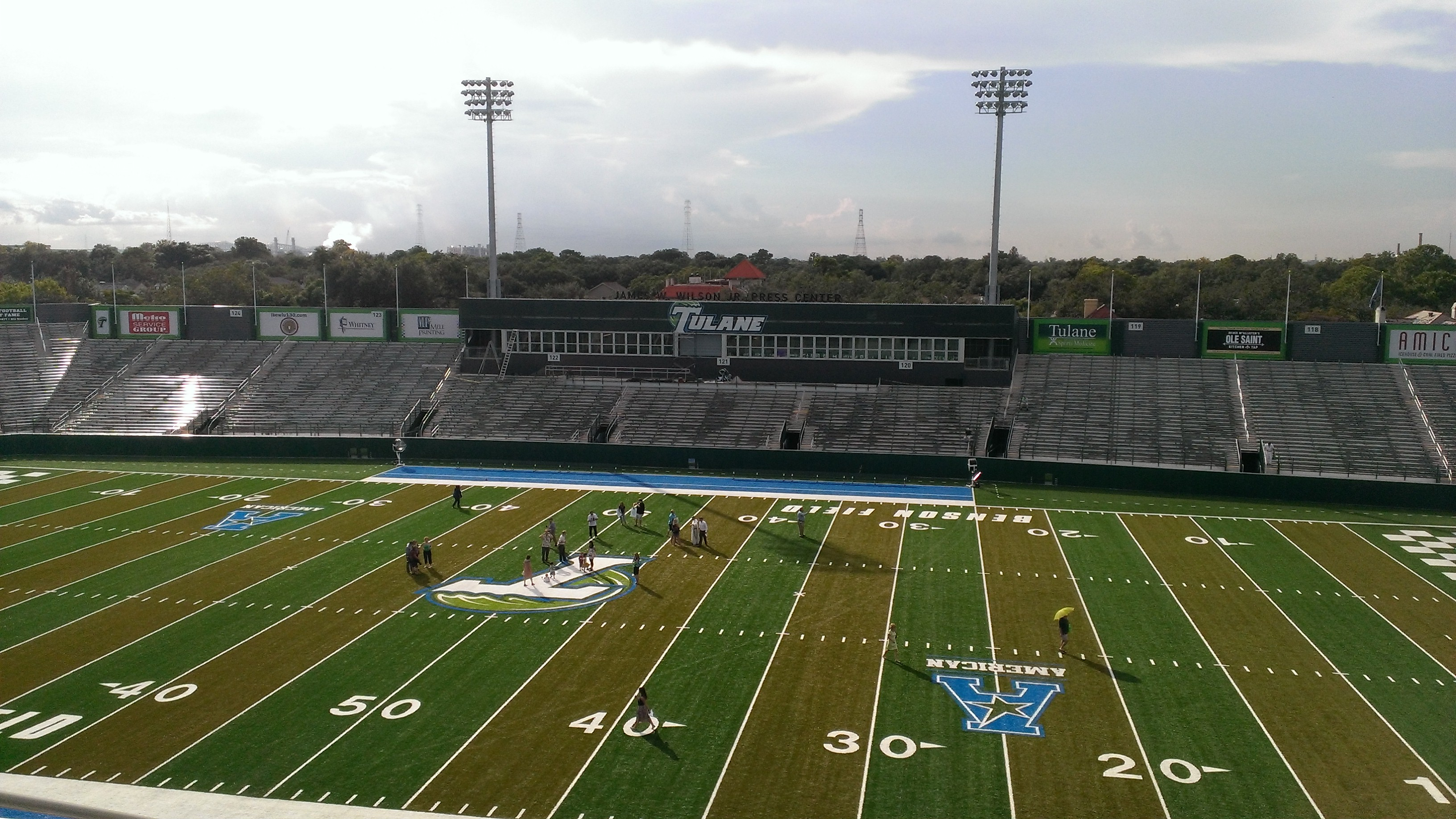
View from Westfeldt Terrace

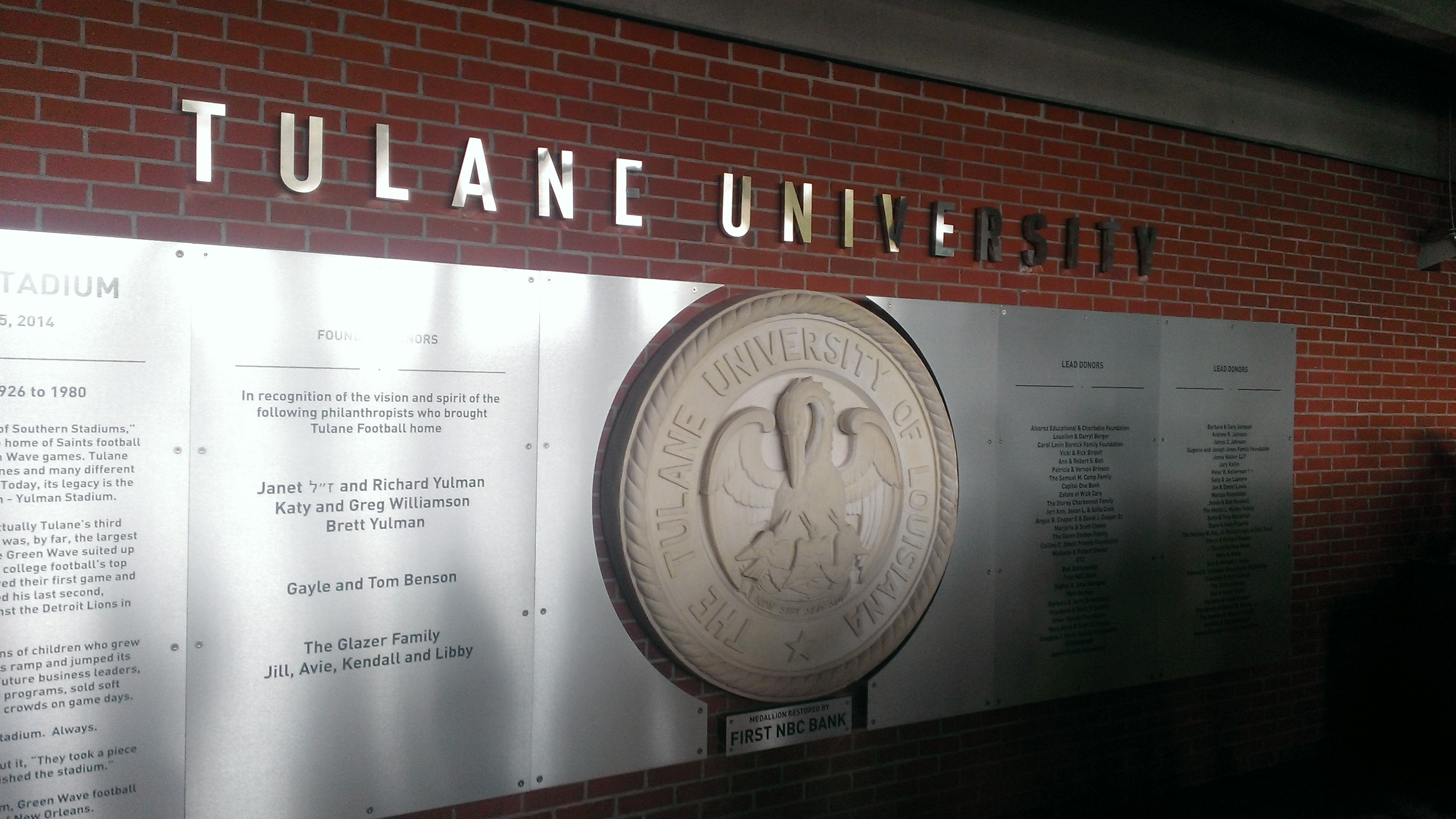
Original Tulane Stadium medallion

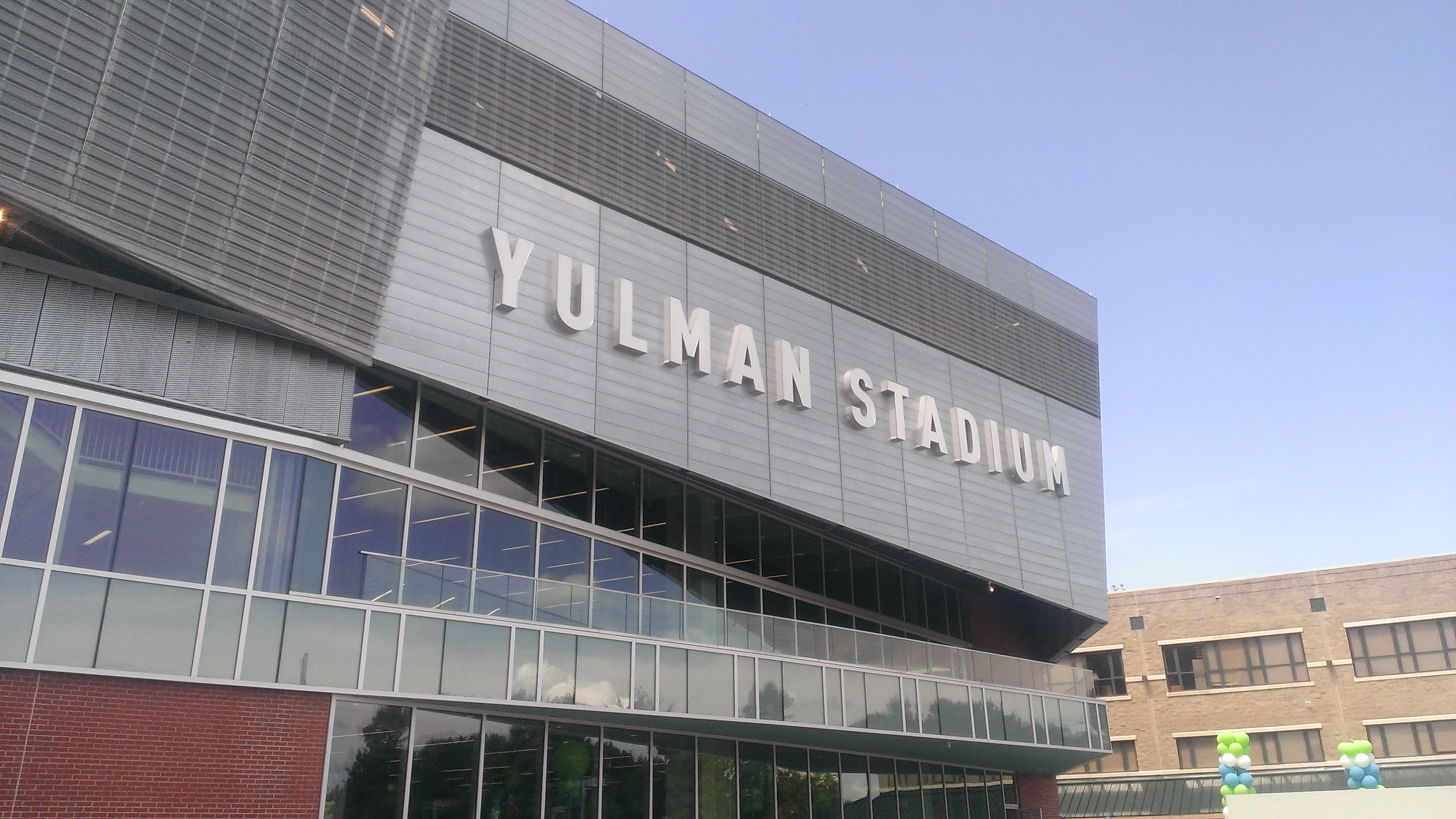
Front facade

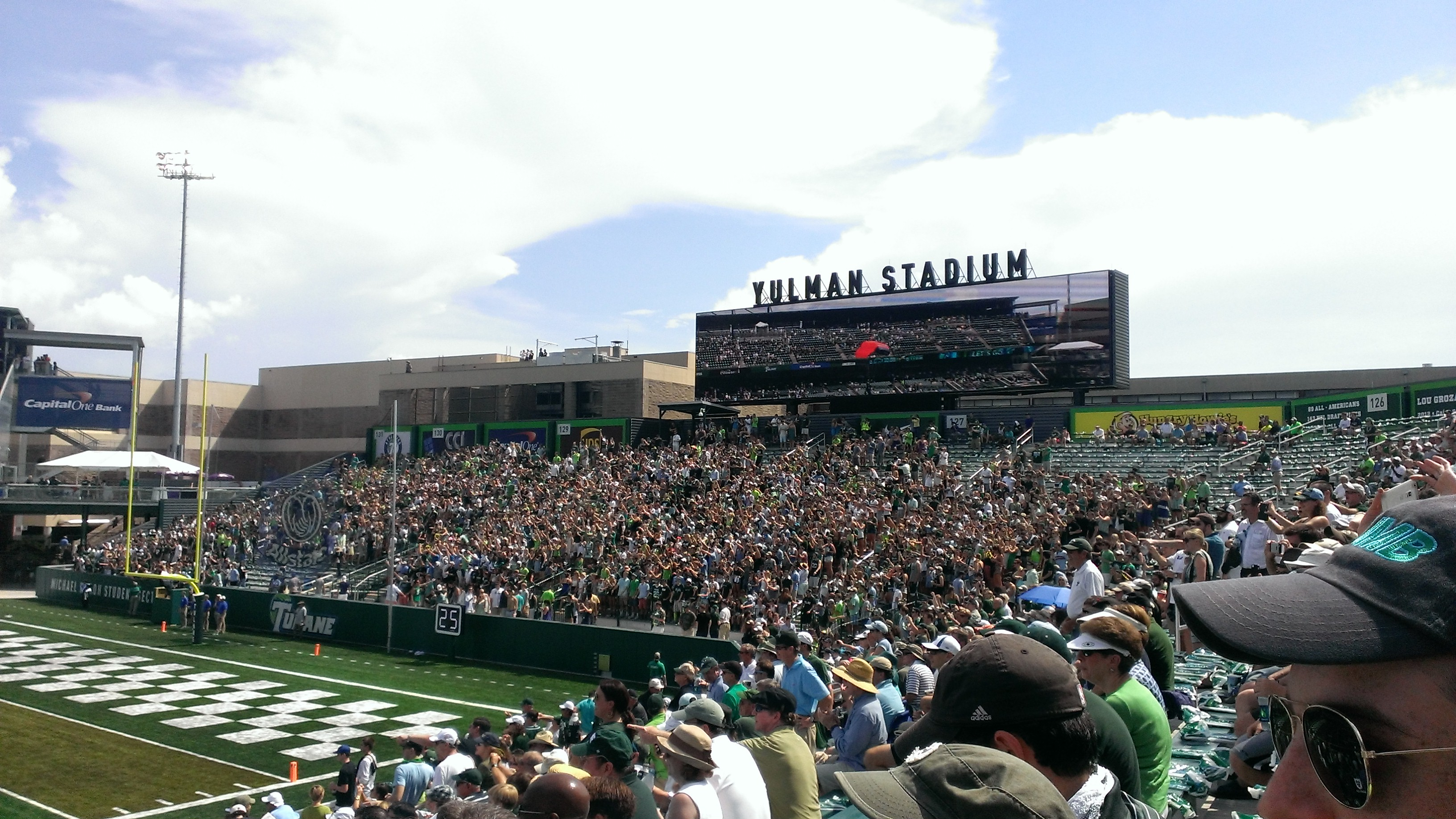
Student section at opening game

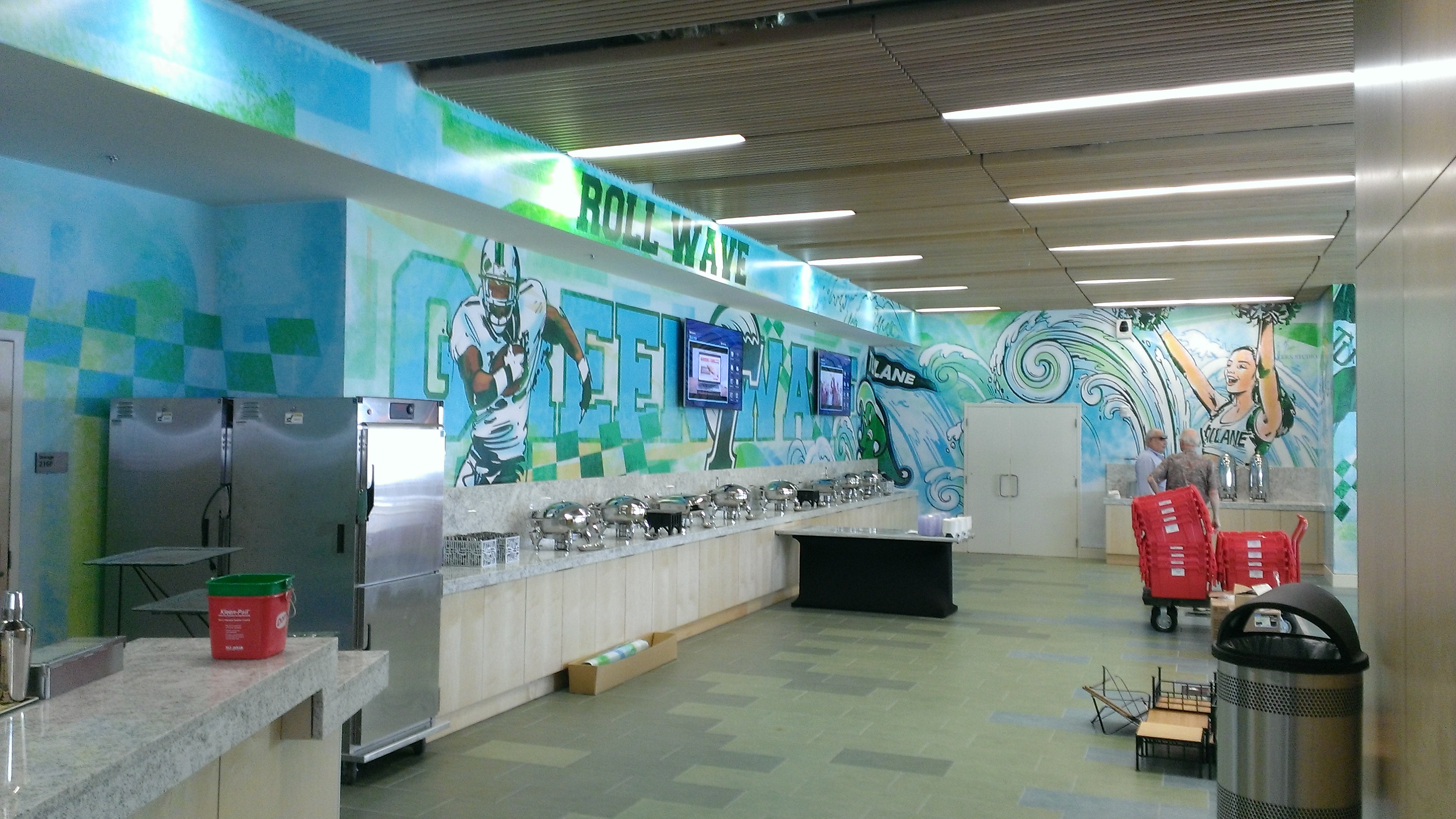
A bar in the Glazer Club

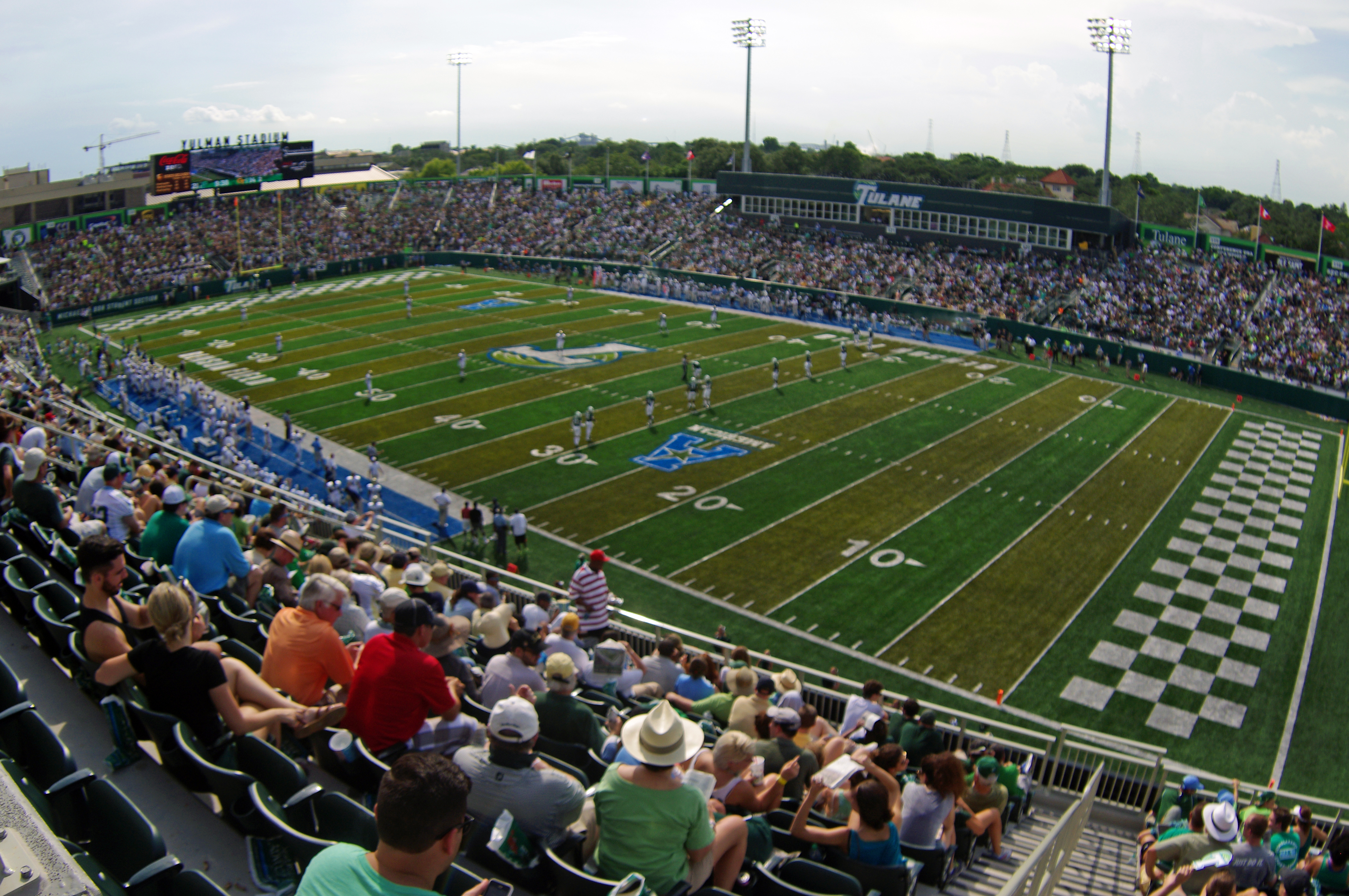
View from Westfeldt Terrace

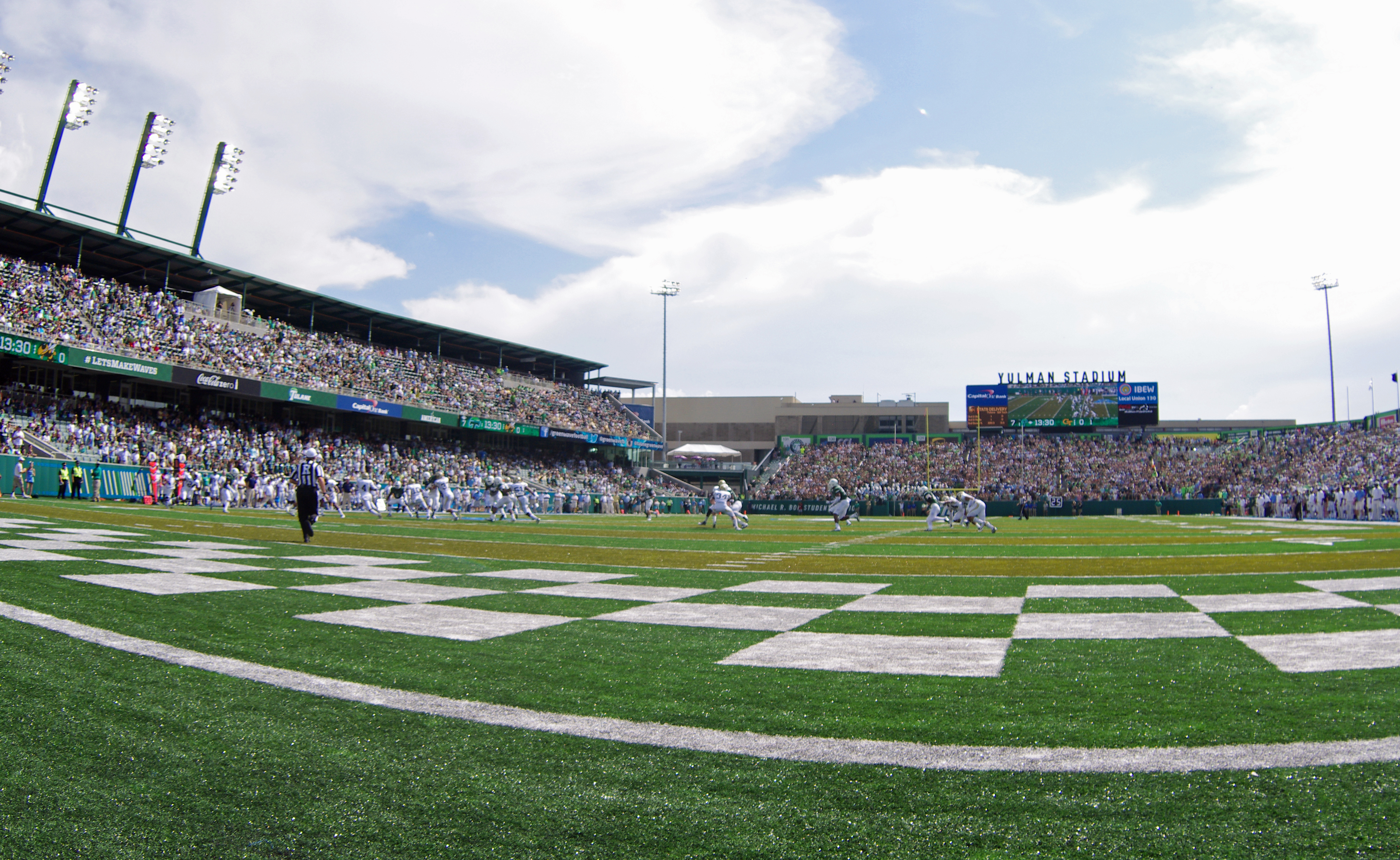
Field view

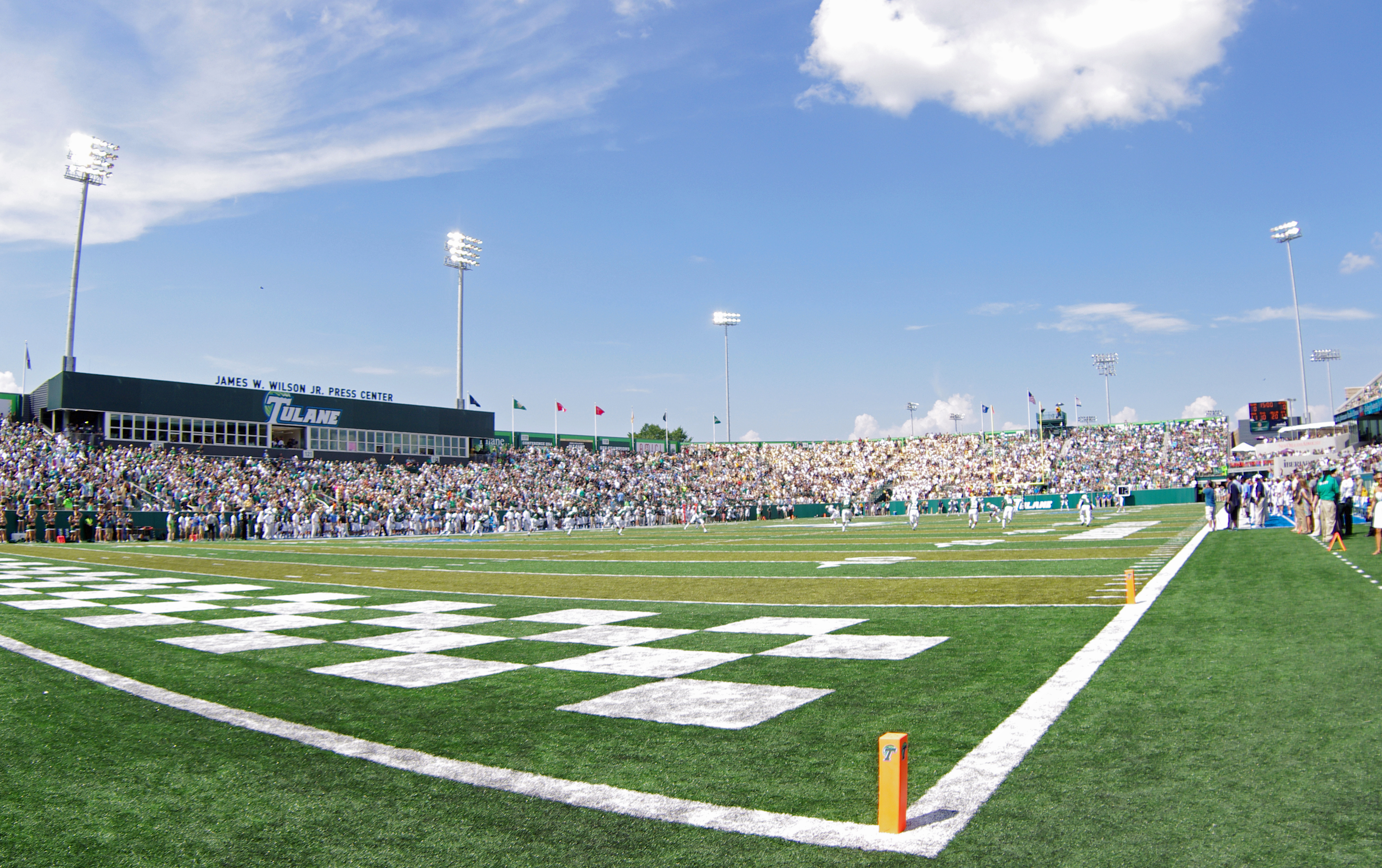
Field view (student endzone)

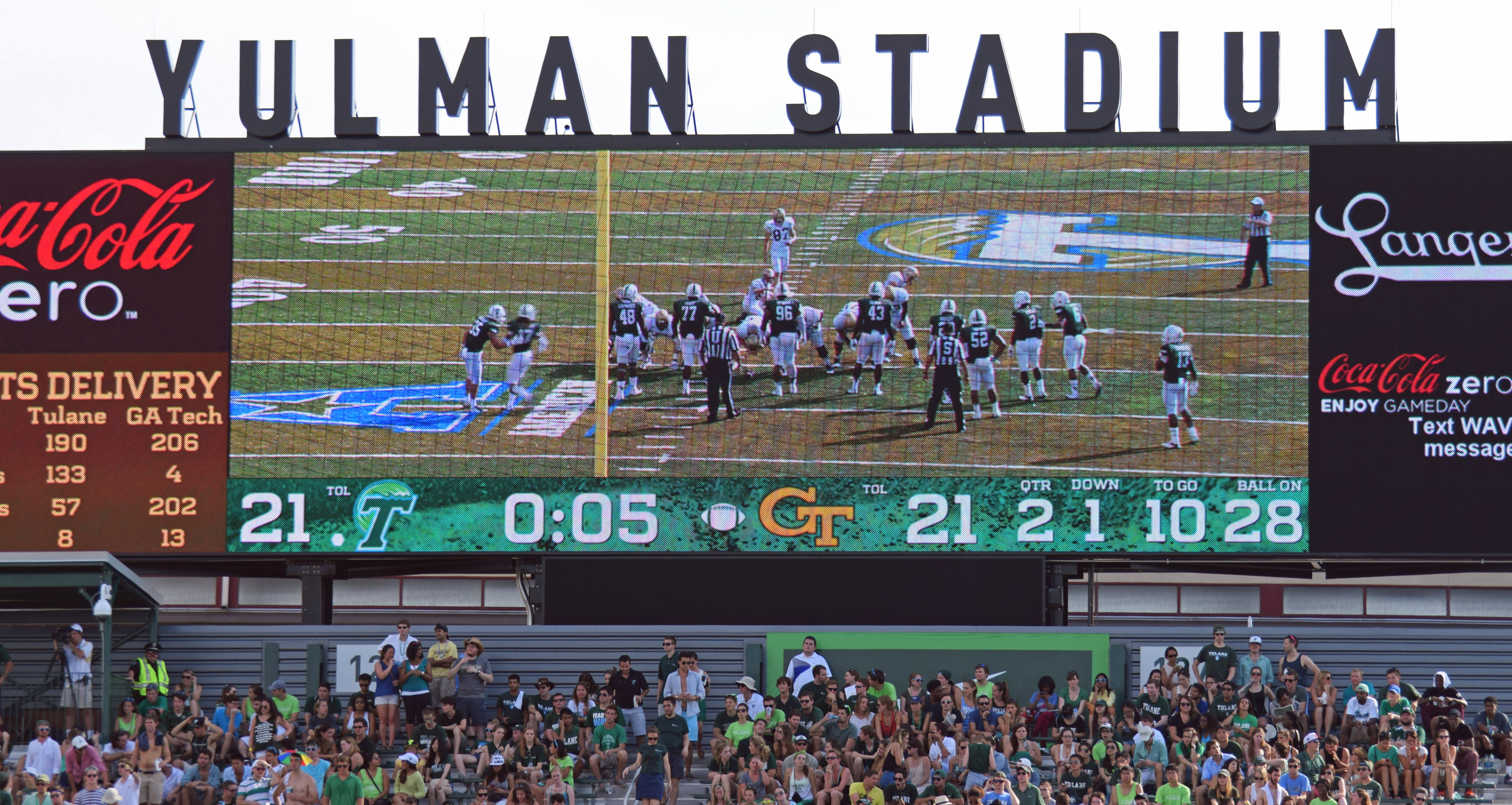
Video board

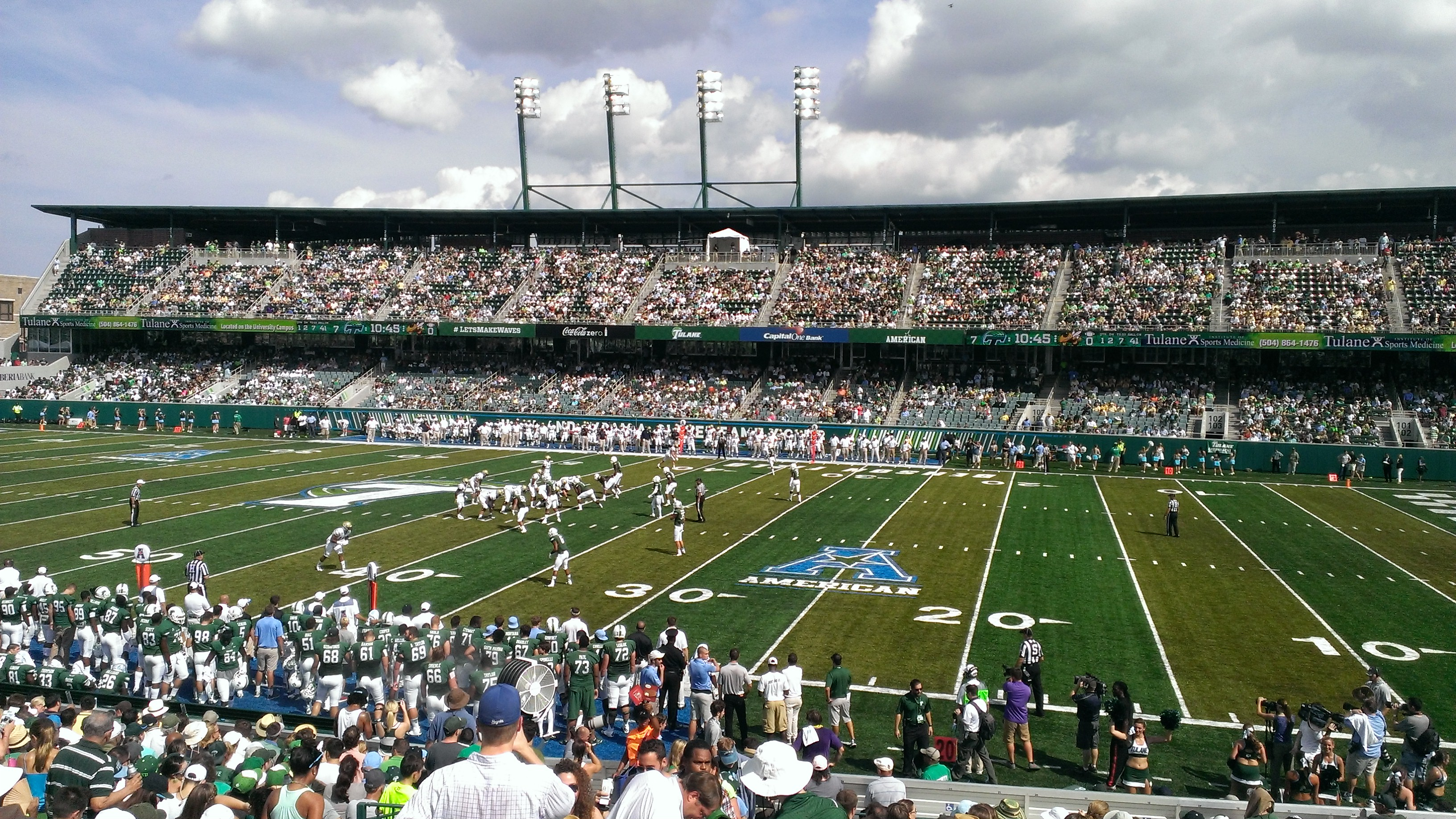
Glazer Club & Westfeldt Terrace

== See also ==
- List of NCAA Division I FBS football stadiums
