= 2016 Alabama A&M Bulldogs football team =

American college football season

2016 Alabama A&M Bulldogs football
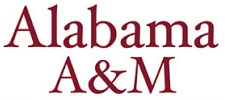
- Conference: Southwestern Athletic Conference
- East Division
- Record: 4–7 (4–5 SWAC)
- Head coach: James Spady (3rd season)
- Offensive coordinator: Andy Fuller (10th season)
- Defensive coordinator: Travis Pearson (1st season)
- Home stadium: Louis Crews Stadium

2016 Southwestern Athletic Conference football standings
	Conf.			Overall
Team	W		L	W		L
East Division
Alcorn State xy	5	–	4	5	–	6
Alabama A&M	4	–	5	4	–	7
Alabama State	3	–	6	4	–	7
Jackson State	3	–	6	3	–	8
Mississippi Valley State	1	–	8	1	–	10
West Division
No. 16 Grambling State xy$	9	–	0	12	–	1
Southern *	8	–	1	8	–	3
Prairie View A&M	7	–	2	7	–	4
Texas Southern	4	–	5	4	–	7
Arkansas–Pine Bluff	1	–	8	1	–	10
Championship: Grambling State 27, Alcorn State 20
$ – Conference champion; x – Division champion/co-champions; y – Championship game participant; * – ineligible for postseason due to APR violations; Rankings from STATS Poll

The 2016 Alabama A&M Bulldogs football team represented Alabama Agricultural and Mechanical University in the 2016 NCAA Division I FCS football season. The Bulldogs were led by third-year head coach James Spady and played their home games at Louis Crews Stadium. They were a member of the East Division of the Southwestern Athletic Conference. They finished the season 4–7, 4–5 in SWAC play to finish in second place in the East Division.

== Schedule ==
Date	Time	Opponent	Site	TV	Result	Attendance
September 3	6:00 pm	at Middle Tennessee*	Johnny "Red" Floyd Stadium; Murfreesboro, TN		L 0–55	19,967
September 10	4:00 pm	at Mississippi Valley State	Rice–Totten Stadium; Itta Bena, MS		W 35–16	2,036
September 17	6:00 pm	Prairie View A&M	Louis Crews Stadium; Huntsville, AL (Louis Crews Classic)		L 20–41	4,226
September 24	6:00 pm	Southern	Louis Crews Stadium; Huntsville, AL		L 31–59	4,364
October 1	7:00 pm	at Texas Southern	BBVA Compass Stadium; Houston, TX	RSSW+	L 31–34	4,282
October 8	2:00 pm	Alcorn State^{†}	Louis Crews Stadium; Huntsville, AL		L 19–42	14,267
October 15	2:30 pm	at Arkansas–Pine Bluff	Golden Lion Stadium; Pine Bluff, AR		W 40–7	10,501
October 29	3:00 pm	vs. Alabama State	Legion Field; Birmingham, AL (Magic City Classic)	ESPN3	W 42–41 ^{OT}	70,813
November 5	2:00 pm	Grambling State	Louis Crews Stadium; Huntsville, AL		L 17–56	6,278
November 12	2:00 pm	at Jackson State	Mississippi Veterans Memorial Stadium; Jackson, MS		W 27–20	6,960
November 19	6:30 pm	at No. 16 (FBS) Auburn*	Jordan–Hare Stadium; Auburn, AL	SECN	L 0–55	87,451
*Non-conference game; ^{†}Homecoming; Rankings from STATS Poll released prior to the game; All times are in Central time
