= 2016 Mississippi Valley State Delta Devils football team =

American college football season

2016 Mississippi Valley State Delta Devils football
- Conference: Southwestern Athletic Conference
- East Division
- Record: 1–10 (1–8 SWAC)
- Head coach: Rick Comegy (3rd season)
- Offensive coordinator: Ray Caldwell (1st season)
- Defensive coordinator: Vincent Dancy (2nd season)
- Home stadium: Rice–Totten Stadium

2016 Southwestern Athletic Conference football standings
	Conf.			Overall
Team	W		L	W		L
East Division
Alcorn State xy	5	–	4	5	–	6
Alabama A&M	4	–	5	4	–	7
Alabama State	3	–	6	4	–	7
Jackson State	3	–	6	3	–	8
Mississippi Valley State	1	–	8	1	–	10
West Division
No. 16 Grambling State xy$	9	–	0	12	–	1
Southern *	8	–	1	8	–	3
Prairie View A&M	7	–	2	7	–	4
Texas Southern	4	–	5	4	–	7
Arkansas–Pine Bluff	1	–	8	1	–	10
Championship: Grambling State 27, Alcorn State 20
$ – Conference champion; x – Division champion/co-champions; y – Championship game participant; * – ineligible for postseason due to APR violations; Rankings from STATS Poll

The 2016 Mississippi Valley State Delta Devils football team represented Mississippi Valley State University as a member of the East Division of the Southwestern Athletic Conference (SWAC) during the 2016 NCAA Division I FCS football season. Led by third-year head coach Rick Comegy, the Delta Devils compiled an overall record of 1–10 and a mark of 1–8 in conference play, placing last out of five teams in the SWAC's East Division. Mississippi Valley State played home games at Rice–Totten Stadium in Itta Bena, Mississippi.

== Schedule ==
Date	Time	Opponent	Site	TV	Result	Attendance
September 2	5:00 pm	at Eastern Michigan*	Rynearson Stadium; Ypsilanti, MI	ESPN3	L 14–61	14,221
September 10	4:00 pm	Alabama A&M	Rice–Totten Stadium; Itta Bena, MS		L 16–35	2,036
September 17	7:00 pm	at Texas Southern	BBVA Compass Stadium; Houston, TX		L 0–31	1,524
September 24	4:00 pm	Prairie View A&M	Rice–Totten Stadium; Itta Bena, MS		L 21–56	3,679
October 1	6:00 pm	at Jackson State	Mississippi Veterans Memorial Stadium; Jackson, MS		L 14–16	18,023
October 8	3:30 pm	at No. 10 Montana*	Washington–Grizzly Stadium; Missoula, MT		L 7–67	24,607
October 15	2:00 pm	at Alabama State	New ASU Stadium; Montgomery, AL		L 24–56	1,526
October 22	2:00 pm	No. 22 Grambling State^{†}	Rice–Totten Stadium; Itta Bena, MS		L 10–59	3,879
November 5	2:30 pm	at Arkansas–Pine Bluff	Golden Lion Stadium; Pine Bluff, AR		W 41–7	1,347
November 12	1:00 pm	Alcorn State	Rice–Totten Stadium; Itta Bena, MS		L 7–61	2,087
November 19	4:00 pm	at Southern	A. W. Mumford Stadium; Baton Rouge, LA		L 0–55	10,097
*Non-conference game; ^{†}Homecoming; Rankings from STATS Poll released prior to the game; All times are in Central time
