= 2016 Prairie View A&M Panthers football team =

American college football season

2016 Prairie View A&M Panthers football
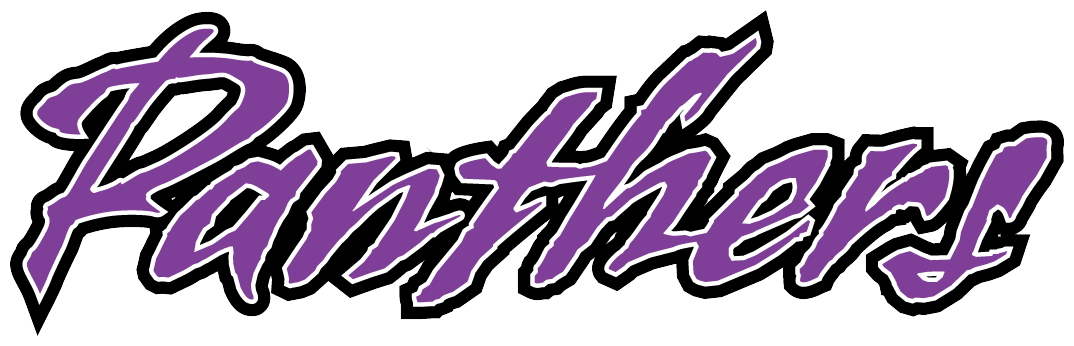
- Conference: Southwestern Athletic Conference
- West Division
- Record: 7–4 (7–2 SWAC)
- Head coach: Willie Simmons (2nd season)
- Offensive coordinator: Alex Jackson (2nd season)
- Defensive coordinator: Ralph Street (2nd season)
- Home stadium: Panther Stadium at Blackshear Field

2016 Southwestern Athletic Conference football standings
	Conf.			Overall
Team	W		L	W		L
East Division
Alcorn State xy	5	–	4	5	–	6
Alabama A&M	4	–	5	4	–	7
Alabama State	3	–	6	4	–	7
Jackson State	3	–	6	3	–	8
Mississippi Valley State	1	–	8	1	–	10
West Division
No. 16 Grambling State xy$	9	–	0	12	–	1
Southern *	8	–	1	8	–	3
Prairie View A&M	7	–	2	7	–	4
Texas Southern	4	–	5	4	–	7
Arkansas–Pine Bluff	1	–	8	1	–	10
Championship: Grambling State 27, Alcorn State 20
$ – Conference champion; x – Division champion/co-champions; y – Championship game participant; * – ineligible for postseason due to APR violations; Rankings from STATS Poll

The 2016 Prairie View A&M Panthers football team represented Prairie View A&M University in the 2016 NCAA Division I FCS football season. The Panthers were led by second-year head coach Willie Simmons and played their home games at Panther Stadium at Blackshear Field. They were a member of the West Division of the Southwestern Athletic Conference (SWAC). They finished the season 7–4, 7–2 in SWAC play to finish in third place in the West Division.

== Schedule ==
Date	Time	Opponent	Site	TV	Result	Attendance
September 3	5:00 pm	Texas Southern	Panther Stadium at Blackshear Field; Prairie View, TX (Labor Day Classic)	ESPNU	W 29–25	14,982
September 10	11:00 am	at No. 20 (FBS) Texas A&M*	Kyle Field; College Station, TX	SECN	L 0–67	96,412
September 17	6:00 pm	at Alabama A&M	Louis Crews Stadium; Huntsville, AL		W 41–20	4,226
September 24	4:00 pm	at Mississippi Valley State	Rice–Totten Stadium; Itta Bena, MS	YouTube	W 56–21	3,679
October 1	3:00 pm	vs. Grambling State	Cotton Bowl; Dallas, TX (State Fair Classic)		L 16–36	53,182
October 8	2:00 pm	Alabama State^{†}	Panther Stadium at Blackshear Field; Prairie View, TX	RSSW	W 24–17 ^{OT}	15,050
October 22	2:30 pm	at Rice*	Rice Stadium; Houston, TX	CUSA.tv	L 44–65	21,538
October 29	2:00 pm	at Jackson State	Mississippi Veterans Memorial Stadium; Jackson, MS	CST	W 28–14	26,215
November 5	1:00 pm	Alcorn State	Panther Stadium at Blackshear Field; Prairie View, TX	ESPN3	W 31–27	5,542
November 12	1:00 pm	Southern	Panther Stadium at Blackshear Field; Prairie View, TX	SWACDN	L 34–44	12,603
November 19	2:30 pm	at Arkansas–Pine Bluff	Golden Lion Stadium; Pine Bluff, AR		W 57–7	2,022
*Non-conference game; ^{†}Homecoming; Rankings from STATS Poll released prior to the game; All times are in Central time

== Roster ==
2016 Prairie View A&M Panthers football team roster
Players
Coaches
Offense

Pos.	#	Name	Class
WR	4	KhaDarel Hodge	Jr
WR	6	Christian Rousseau	Sr
QB	7	Trey Green	Sr
TE	42	John Allen	Jr
OT	56	Josiah Freeman	Sr
C	57	Jamal Crawford	Fr
G	60	Donovan Wheaton	Jr
C	61	Eugene Goodrum	Jr
OT	62	Cleveland Sims Jr.	Sr

Defense

Pos.	#	Name	Class
S	2	Damond Jackson	Jr
LB	44	Treveon Billings	Sr
LB	54	Jalyn Williams	Jr
LB	55	Don Rittenhouse	Jr

Special teams

Pos.	#	Name	Class

Head coach

- Willie Simmons

Coordinators/assistant coaches

Legend

- (C) Team captain
- (S) Suspended
- (I) Ineligible
- Injured
- Redshirt

Roster
