= 2016 Grambling State Tigers football team =

American college football season

2016 Grambling State Tigers football

Black college football national champion Celebration Bowl champion SWAC champion SWAC West Division champion

SWAC Championship Game, W 27–20 vs. Alcorn State

Celebration Bowl, W 10–9 vs. North Carolina Central
- Conference: Southwestern Athletic Conference
- West Division

Ranking
- STATS: No. 16
- FCS Coaches: No. 15
- Record: 12–1 (9–0 SWAC)
- Head coach: Broderick Fobbs (3rd season)
- Offensive coordinator: Eric Dooley (3rd season)
- Defensive coordinator: Everett Todd (3rd season)
- Base defense: 3–3–5
- Home stadium: Eddie Robinson Stadium

2016 Southwestern Athletic Conference football standings
	Conf.			Overall
Team	W		L	W		L
East Division
Alcorn State xy	5	–	4	5	–	6
Alabama A&M	4	–	5	4	–	7
Alabama State	3	–	6	4	–	7
Jackson State	3	–	6	3	–	8
Mississippi Valley State	1	–	8	1	–	10
West Division
No. 16 Grambling State xy$	9	–	0	12	–	1
Southern *	8	–	1	8	–	3
Prairie View A&M	7	–	2	7	–	4
Texas Southern	4	–	5	4	–	7
Arkansas–Pine Bluff	1	–	8	1	–	10
Championship: Grambling State 27, Alcorn State 20
$ – Conference champion; x – Division champion/co-champions; y – Championship game participant; * – ineligible for postseason due to APR violations; Rankings from STATS Poll

The 2016 Grambling State Tigers football team represented Grambling State University in the 2016 NCAA Division I FCS football season. The Tigers were led by third year head coach Broderick Fobbs. They competed as members of the West Division of the Southwestern Athletic Conference (SWAC) and played their home games at Eddie Robinson Stadium in Grambling, Louisiana. They finished the season 12–1, 9–0 in SWAC play to be champions of the West Division. They represented the West Division in the SWAC Championship Game where they defeated Alcorn State. The Tigers also defeated MEAC champion North Carolina Central in the Celebration Bowl, earning their fifteenth black college football national championship.

== Schedule ==
Date	Time	Opponent	Rank	Site	TV	Result	Attendance
September 3	6:00 pm	Virginia–Lynchburg*		Eddie Robinson Stadium; Grambling, LA		W 72–12	9,500
September 10	9:45 pm	at Arizona*		Arizona Stadium; Tucson, AZ	P12N	L 21–31	45,686
September 17	6:00 pm	at Jackson State		Mississippi Veterans Memorial Stadium; Jackson, MS	ESPN3	W 35–14	13,890
September 24	6:00 pm	Alcorn State		Eddie Robinson Stadium; Grambling, LA		W 43–18	14,126
October 1	3:00 pm	vs. Prairie View A&M		Cotton Bowl; Dallas, TX (State Fair Classic)		W 36–16	53,182
October 22	2:00 pm	at Mississippi Valley State	No. 22	Rice–Totten Stadium; Itta Bena, MS		W 59–10	3,879
October 29	2:00 pm	Arkansas–Pine Bluff^{†}	No. 21	Eddie Robinson Stadium; Grambling, LA		W 70–0	18,543
November 5	2:00 pm	at Alabama A&M	No. 21	Louis Crews Stadium; Huntsville, AL		W 56–17	6,278
November 12	2:00 pm	vs. Alabama State	No. 20	Independence Stadium; Shreveport, LA (Red River State Fair Classic)		W 21–0	15,043
November 19	2:00 pm	at Texas Southern	No. 17	BBVA Compass Stadium; Houston, TX	RSSW	W 47–28	9,146
November 26	4:00 pm	vs. Southern	No. 16	Mercedes-Benz Superdome; New Orleans, LA (Bayou Classic)	NBCSN	W 52–30	67,845
December 3	3:00 pm	vs. Alcorn State	No. 16	NRG Stadium; Houston, TX (SWAC Championship Game)	ESPNU	W 27–20	24,917
December 17	3:00 pm	vs. No. 20 North Carolina Central*	No. 16	Georgia Dome; Atlanta, GA (Celebration Bowl)	ABC	W 10–9	31,096
*Non-conference game; ^{†}Homecoming; Rankings from STATS Poll released prior to the game; All times are in Central time

== Ranking movements ==
Ranking movements Legend: ██ Increase in ranking ██ Decrease in ranking — = Not ranked RV = Received votes
	Week													
Poll	Pre	1	2	3	4	5	6	7	8	9	10	11	12	Final
STATS FCS	RV	RV	RV	RV	RV	RV	25	22	21	21	20	17	16	16
Coaches	RV	RV	RV	—	—	25	23	21	21	19	16	16	14	15
