= 2016 Alabama State Hornets football team =

American college football season

2016 Alabama State Hornets football
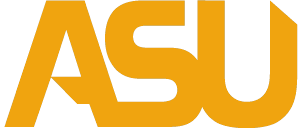
- Conference: Southwestern Athletic Conference
- East Division
- Record: 4–7 (3–6 SWAC)
- Head coach: Brian Jenkins (2nd season)
- Offensive coordinator: Mark Orlando (2nd season)
- Co-defensive coordinators: Lou West (2nd season); Ted Daisher (2nd season)
- Home stadium: New ASU Stadium

2016 Southwestern Athletic Conference football standings
	Conf.			Overall
Team	W		L	W		L
East Division
Alcorn State xy	5	–	4	5	–	6
Alabama A&M	4	–	5	4	–	7
Alabama State	3	–	6	4	–	7
Jackson State	3	–	6	3	–	8
Mississippi Valley State	1	–	8	1	–	10
West Division
No. 16 Grambling State xy$	9	–	0	12	–	1
Southern *	8	–	1	8	–	3
Prairie View A&M	7	–	2	7	–	4
Texas Southern	4	–	5	4	–	7
Arkansas–Pine Bluff	1	–	8	1	–	10
Championship: Grambling State 27, Alcorn State 20
$ – Conference champion; x – Division champion/co-champions; y – Championship game participant; * – ineligible for postseason due to APR violations; Rankings from STATS Poll

The 2016 Alabama State Hornets football team represented Alabama State University as a member of the East Division of the Southwestern Athletic Conference (SWAC) during 2016 NCAA Division I FCS football season. Led by second-year head coach Brian Jenkins, the Hornets compiled an overall record of 4–7 with a mark of 3–6 in conference play, tying for third place in the SWAC East Division. Alabama State played home games at New ASU Stadium in Montgomery, Alabama.

== Schedule ==
Date	Time	Opponent	Site	TV	Result	Attendance
September 3	11:00 am	at UTSA*	Alamodome; San Antonio, TX		L 13–26	22,380
September 10	6:00 pm	at Alcorn State	Casem-Spinks Stadium; Lorman, MS	ESPN3	L 18–21	9,734
September 17	6:00 pm	at Southern	Ace W. Mumford Stadium; Baton Rouge, LA		L 6–64	14,199
September 24	6:00 pm	Texas Southern	New ASU Stadium; Montgomery, AL		L 27–31	14,199
October 1	2:00 pm	Arkansas–Pine Bluff	New ASU Stadium; Montgomery, AL		W 41–21	3,783
October 8	2:00 pm	at Prairie View A&M	Panther Stadium at Blackshear Field; Prairie View, TX	RSSW	L 17–24 ^{OT}	15,050
October 15	2:00 pm	Mississippi Valley State	New ASU Stadium; Montgomery, AL		W 56–24	1,526
October 29	3:00 pm	vs. Alabama A&M	Legion Field; Birmingham, AL (Magic City Classic)	ESPN3	L 41–42 ^{OT}	70,813
November 5	2:00 pm	Jackson State	New ASU Stadium; Montgomery, AL		W 14–7	7,823
November 12	2:00 pm	vs. No. 20 Grambling State	Independence Stadium; Shreveport, LA (Red River State Fair Classic)		L 0–21	15,043
November 24	3:00 pm	Miles*^{†}	New ASU Stadium; Montgomery, AL (Turkey Day Classic)	ESPN3	W 53–20	18,972
*Non-conference game; ^{†}Homecoming; Rankings from STATS Poll released prior to the game; All times are in Central time
