= 2016 Arkansas–Pine Bluff Golden Lions football team =

American college football season

2016 Arkansas–Pine Bluff Golden Lions football
- Conference: Southwestern Athletic Conference
- West Division
- Record: 1–10 (1–8 SWAC)
- Head coach: Monte Coleman (9th season)
- Offensive coordinator: Ted White (2nd season)
- Defensive coordinator: Monte Coleman (11th season)
- Home stadium: Golden Lion Stadium

2016 Southwestern Athletic Conference football standings
	Conf.			Overall
Team	W		L	W		L
East Division
Alcorn State xy	5	–	4	5	–	6
Alabama A&M	4	–	5	4	–	7
Alabama State	3	–	6	4	–	7
Jackson State	3	–	6	3	–	8
Mississippi Valley State	1	–	8	1	–	10
West Division
No. 16 Grambling State xy$	9	–	0	12	–	1
Southern *	8	–	1	8	–	3
Prairie View A&M	7	–	2	7	–	4
Texas Southern	4	–	5	4	–	7
Arkansas–Pine Bluff	1	–	8	1	–	10
Championship: Grambling State 27, Alcorn State 20
$ – Conference champion; x – Division champion/co-champions; y – Championship game participant; * – ineligible for postseason due to APR violations; Rankings from STATS Poll

The 2016 Arkansas–Pine Bluff Golden Lions football team represented the University of Arkansas at Pine Bluff in the 2016 NCAA Division I FCS football season. The Golden Lions were led by ninth-year head coach Monte Coleman and played their home games at Golden Lion Stadium as a member of the West Division of the Southwestern Athletic Conference (SWAC). They finished the season 1–10, 1–8 in SWAC play to finish in last place in the West Division.

== Schedule ==
Date	Time	Opponent	Site	TV	Result	Attendance
September 3	6:00 pm	at Tennessee State*	Nissan Stadium; Nashville, TN (John Merritt Classic)	OVCDN	L 0–44	15,078
September 10	6:00 pm	Oklahoma Panhandle State*	Golden Lion Stadium; Pine Bluff, AR		L 16–20	5,668
September 15	6:30 pm	at Alcorn State	Casem-Spinks Stadium; Lorman, MS	ESPNU	W 45–43 ^{3OT}	4,826
September 24	4:00 pm	vs. Jackson State	War Memorial Stadium; Little Rock, AR		L 20–32	14,501
October 1	2:00 pm	at Alabama State	The New ASU Stadium; Montgomery, AL		L 21–41	3,783
October 15	2:30 pm	Alabama A&M^{†}	Golden Lion Stadium; Pine Bluff, AR		L 7–40	10,501
October 22	4:00 pm	at Southern	Ace W. Mumford Stadium; Baton Rouge, LA		L 17–49	23,156
October 29	2:00 pm	at Grambling State	Eddie Robinson Stadium; Grambling, LA		L 0–70	18,543
November 5	2:30 pm	Mississippi Valley State	Golden Lion Stadium; Pine Bluff, AR		L 7–41	1,347
November 12	2:00 pm	at Texas Southern	BBVA Compass Stadium; Houston, TX	RSSW	L 10–27	1,782
November 19	2:30 pm	Prairie View A&M	Golden Lion Stadium; Pine Bluff, AR		L 7–57	2,022
*Non-conference game; ^{†}Homecoming; All times are in Central time
