= 2016 Alcorn State Braves football team =

American college football season

2016 Alcorn State Braves football

SWAC East Division champion

SWAC Championship Game, L 20–27 vs. Grambling State
- Conference: Southwestern Athletic Conference
- East Division
- Record: 5–6 (5–4 SWAC)
- Head coach: Fred McNair (1st season)
- Offensive coordinator: Fred Kaiss (1st season)
- Defensive coordinator: Cedric Thomas (1st season)
- Home stadium: Casem-Spinks Stadium

2016 Southwestern Athletic Conference football standings
	Conf.			Overall
Team	W		L	W		L
East Division
Alcorn State xy	5	–	4	5	–	6
Alabama A&M	4	–	5	4	–	7
Alabama State	3	–	6	4	–	7
Jackson State	3	–	6	3	–	8
Mississippi Valley State	1	–	8	1	–	10
West Division
No. 16 Grambling State xy$	9	–	0	12	–	1
Southern *	8	–	1	8	–	3
Prairie View A&M	7	–	2	7	–	4
Texas Southern	4	–	5	4	–	7
Arkansas–Pine Bluff	1	–	8	1	–	10
Championship: Grambling State 27, Alcorn State 20
$ – Conference champion; x – Division champion/co-champions; y – Championship game participant; * – ineligible for postseason due to APR violations; Rankings from STATS Poll

The 2016 Alcorn State Braves football team represented Alcorn State University in the 2016 NCAA Division I FCS football season. The Braves were led by first-year head coach Fred McNair and played their home games at Casem-Spinks Stadium. They were a member of the East Division of the Southwestern Athletic Conference and finished with a record of 5–6 as SWAC runners-up after they were defeated by Grambling State in the SWAC Championship Game.

== Schedule ==
Date	Time	Opponent	Site	TV	Result	Attendance
September 4	12:00 p.m.	Bethune–Cookman*	Municipal Stadium; Daytona Beach, FL (MEAC/SWAC Challenge)	ESPN	No contest	
September 10	6:00 p.m.	Alabama State	Casem-Spinks Stadium; Lorman, MS	ESPN3	W 21–18	9,734
September 15	6:30 p.m.	Arkansas–Pine Bluff	Casem-Spinks Stadium; Lorman, MS	ESPNU	L 43–45 ^{3OT}	4,826
September 24	6:00 p.m.	at Grambling State	Eddie Robinson Stadium; Grambling, LA		L 18–43	14,126
October 1	11:00 a.m.	at No. 20 (FBS) Arkansas*	War Memorial Stadium; Little Rock, AR	SECN	L 10–52	46,988
October 8	2:00 p.m.	at Alabama A&M	Louis Crews Stadium; Huntsville, AL		W 42–19	14,267
October 15	2:00 p.m.	Texas Southern^{†}	Casem-Spinks Stadium; Lorman, MS		W 23–20	11,142
October 29	2:00 p.m.	Southern	Casem-Spinks Stadium; Lorman, MS		L 33–41	18,717
November 5	1:00 p.m.	at Prairie View A&M	Panther Stadium at Blackshear Field; Prairie View, TX	ESPN3	L 27–31	5,542
November 12	1:00 p.m.	at Mississippi Valley State	Rice–Totten Stadium; Itta Bena, MS		W 61–7	2,087
November 19	2:00 p.m.	Jackson State	Casem-Spinks Stadium; Lorman, MS		W 35–16	27,297
December 3	3:00 p.m.	vs. No. 16 Grambling State	NRG Stadium; Houston, TX (SWAC Championship Game)	ESPNU	L 20–27	24,917
*Non-conference game; ^{†}Homecoming; Rankings from STATS Poll released prior to the game; All times are in Central time
