= 2016 Southern Jaguars football team =

American college football season

2016 Southern Jaguars football
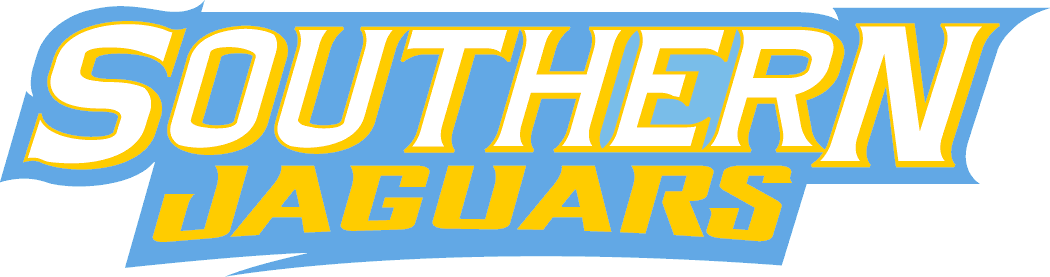
- Conference: Southwestern Athletic Conference
- West Division
- Record: 8–3 (8–1 SWAC)
- Head coach: Dawson Odums (4th season)
- Offensive coordinator: Chennis Berry (4th season)
- Defensive coordinator: Trei Oliver (1st season)
- Home stadium: Ace W. Mumford Stadium

2016 Southwestern Athletic Conference football standings
	Conf.			Overall
Team	W		L	W		L
East Division
Alcorn State xy	5	–	4	5	–	6
Alabama A&M	4	–	5	4	–	7
Alabama State	3	–	6	4	–	7
Jackson State	3	–	6	3	–	8
Mississippi Valley State	1	–	8	1	–	10
West Division
No. 16 Grambling State xy$	9	–	0	12	–	1
Southern *	8	–	1	8	–	3
Prairie View A&M	7	–	2	7	–	4
Texas Southern	4	–	5	4	–	7
Arkansas–Pine Bluff	1	–	8	1	–	10
Championship: Grambling State 27, Alcorn State 20
$ – Conference champion; x – Division champion/co-champions; y – Championship game participant; * – ineligible for postseason due to APR violations; Rankings from STATS Poll

The 2016 Southern Jaguars football team represented Southern University in the 2016 NCAA Division I FCS football season. The Jaguars were led by fourth-year head coach Dawson Odums. The Jaguars played their home games at Ace W. Mumford Stadium and were a member of the West Division of the Southwestern Athletic Conference (SWAC). They finished the season 8–3, 8–1 in SWAC play to finish in second place in the West Division.

== Schedule ==
Date	Time	Opponent	Site	TV	Result	Attendance
September 3	6:00 pm	at Louisiana–Monroe*	Malone Stadium; Monroe, LA	ESPN3	L 21–38	24,718
September 10	7:00 pm	at Tulane*	Yulman Stadium; New Orleans, LA	ESPN3	L 21–66	27,179
September 17	6:00 pm	Alabama State	Ace W. Mumford Stadium; Baton Rouge, LA	CST	W 64–6	14,199
September 24	6:00 pm	at Alabama A&M	Louis Crews Stadium; Huntsville, AL		W 59–31	4,364
October 15	6:00 pm	at Jackson State	Mississippi Veterans Memorial Stadium; Jackson, MS (rivalry)		W 28–24	33,210
October 22	4:00 pm	Arkansas–Pine Bluff^{†}	Ace W. Mumford Stadium; Baton Rouge, LA	CST	W 49–17	23,156
October 29	2:00 pm	at Alcorn State	Casem-Spinks Stadium; Lorman, MS		W 41–33	18,717
November 5	4:00 pm	Texas Southern	Ace W. Mumford Stadium; Baton Rouge, LA	CST	W 26–10	7,259
November 12	1:00 pm	at Prairie View A&M	Panther Stadium at Blackshear Field; Prairie View, TX	SWACDN	W 44–34	12,603
November 19	4:00 pm	Mississippi Valley State	Ace W. Mumford Stadium; Baton Rouge, LA		W 55–0	10,097
November 26	4:00 pm	vs. No. 16 Grambling State	Mercedes-Benz Superdome; New Orleans, LA (Bayou Classic)	NBCSN	L 30–52	67,845
*Non-conference game; ^{†}Homecoming; Rankings from STATS Poll released prior to the game; All times are in Central time
