= Broderick Fobbs =

American football player and coach (born 1974)

Current position
- Title: Running backs coach
- Team: South Alabama
- Conference: Sun Belt

Biographical details
- Born: August 2, 1974 (age 52); Monroe, Louisiana, U.S.

Playing career
- 1992–1996: Grambling State
- Position: Running back

Coaching career (HC unless noted)
- 2000–2002: Louisiana–Lafayette (GA)
- 2003–2004: Northwestern State (TE)
- 2005–2006: Northwestern State (co-OC/WR)
- 2007–2011: McNeese State (co-OC/WR)
- 2012: Southern Miss (WR)
- 2013: McNeese State (TE)
- 2014–2021: Grambling State
- 2022: Ruston HS (LA) (RB)
- 2023–2024: Louisiana–Monroe (RB)
- 2025–present: South Alabama (RB)

Head coaching record
- Overall: 54–32
- Bowls: 1–1

Accomplishments and honors

Championships
- 1 black college national (2016); 2 SWAC (2016–2017); 3 SWAC West Division (2015–2017)

Broderick Lee Fobbs (born August 2, 1974) is an American college football coach who is the running backs coach for South Alabama, a position he has held since 2025. He was the head football coach at Grambling State University from 2014 to 2021. After having served as an assistant coach at several other schools, on December 4, 2013, Fobbs was introduced as head coach of the Tigers.

== Head coaching record ==
Year	Team	Overall	Conference	Standing	Bowl/playoffs	Media^{#}	Coaches^{°}
Grambling State Tigers (Southwestern Athletic Conference) (2014–2021)
2014	Grambling State	7–5	7–2	2nd (West)			
2015	Grambling State	9–3	9–0	1st (West)		24	
2016	Grambling State	12–1	9–0	1st (West)	W Celebration	16	15
2017	Grambling State	11–2	7–0	1st (West)	L Celebration	16	14
2018	Grambling State	6–5	4–3	T–2nd (West)			
2019	Grambling State	6–5	4–3	T–2nd (West)			
2020–21	Grambling State	0–4	0–4	5th (West)			
2021	Grambling State	3–7	2–5				
Grambling State:		54–32	42–17				
Total:		54–32					
National championship Conference title Conference division title or championship game berth
^{#}Rankings from final The Sports Network/STATS LLC poll.; ^{°}Rankings from final FCS Coaches' Poll.
