= 2016 Texas Southern Tigers football team =

American college football season

2016 Texas Southern Tigers football
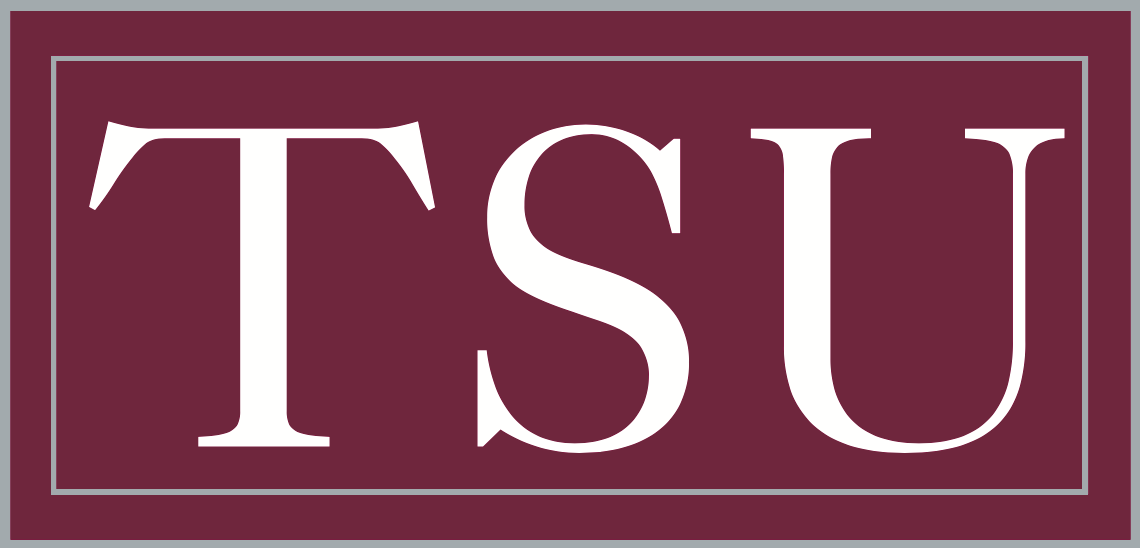
- Conference: Southwestern Athletic Conference
- West Division
- Record: 4–7 (4–5 SWAC)
- Head coach: Michael Haywood (1st season)
- Offensive coordinator: Greg Gregory (1st season)
- Defensive coordinator: Tom Anthony (1st season)
- Home stadium: BBVA Compass Stadium

2016 Southwestern Athletic Conference football standings
	Conf.			Overall
Team	W		L	W		L
East Division
Alcorn State xy	5	–	4	5	–	6
Alabama A&M	4	–	5	4	–	7
Alabama State	3	–	6	4	–	7
Jackson State	3	–	6	3	–	8
Mississippi Valley State	1	–	8	1	–	10
West Division
No. 16 Grambling State xy$	9	–	0	12	–	1
Southern *	8	–	1	8	–	3
Prairie View A&M	7	–	2	7	–	4
Texas Southern	4	–	5	4	–	7
Arkansas–Pine Bluff	1	–	8	1	–	10
Championship: Grambling State 27, Alcorn State 20
$ – Conference champion; x – Division champion/co-champions; y – Championship game participant; * – ineligible for postseason due to APR violations; Rankings from STATS Poll

The 2016 Texas Southern Tigers football team represented Texas Southern University a member of the West Division of the Southwestern Athletic Conference (SWAC) during the 2016 NCAA Division I FCS football season. Led by first-year head coach Michael Haywood, the Tigers compiled an overall record of 4–7 with a mark of 4–5 in conference play, placing fourth in the SWAC's West Division. Texas Southern played home games at BBVA Compass Stadium in Houston.

== Schedule ==
Date	Time	Opponent	Site	TV	Result	Attendance
September 3	5:00 pm	at Prairie View A&M	Panther Stadium at Blackshear Field; Prairie View, TX (Labor Day Classic)	ESPNU	L 25–29	14,982
September 10	7:00 pm	at Houston Baptist*	Husky Stadium; Houston, TX	RSSW	L 20–24	4,125
September 17	7:00 pm	Mississippi Valley State	BBVA Compass Stadium; Houston, TX	RSSW (tape delay)	W 31–0	1,524
September 24	6:00 pm	at Alabama State	The New ASU Stadium; Montgomery, AL		W 31–27	14,199
October 1	7:00 pm	Alabama A&M	BBVA Compass Stadium; Houston, TX	RSSW	W 34–31	4,282
October 15	2:00 pm	at Alcorn State	Casem-Spinks Stadium; Lorman, MS		L 20–23	11,142
October 22	2:00 pm	Jackson State^{†}	BBVA Compass Stadium; Houston, TX	RSSW	L 13–21	10,121
October 29	6:00 pm	at No. 1 Sam Houston State*	Bowers Stadium; Huntsville, TX	ESPN3	L 17–66	8,611
November 5	4:00 pm	at Southern	Ace W. Mumford Stadium; Baton Rouge, LA		L 10–26	7,259
November 12	2:00 pm	Arkansas–Pine Bluff	BBVA Compass Stadium; Houston, TX	RSSW	W 27–10	1,782
November 19	2:00 pm	No. 17 Grambling State	BBVA Compass Stadium; Houston, TX	RSSW	L 28–47	9,146
*Non-conference game; ^{†}Homecoming; Rankings from STATS Poll released prior to the game; All times are in Central time
