= Tony Hughes (American football) =

American football player and coach (born 1959)

Biographical details
- Born: May 22, 1959 (age 67)

Playing career
- 1976–1977: St. Paul's (VA)
- 1978–1979: Southern Miss
- Position: Defensive back

Coaching career (HC unless noted)
- 1984: Southern Miss (DB/GA)
- 1985: Philadelphia HS (MS)
- 1986–1987: South Natches HS (MS) (DB)
- 1988–1991: Hattiesburg HS (MS) (OC)
- 1992–1993: West Alabama (DB)
- 1994–2001: Hinds CC (MS) (DB)
- 2002: Hinds CC (MS) (DC)
- 2003: Louisiana Tech (DB)
- 2004: Louisiana Tech (OLB)
- 2005–2006: Ole Miss (DB)
- 2007: Ole Miss (TE)
- 2008: Southern Miss (DB)
- 2009–2015: Mississippi State (AHC/DB/RC)
- 2016–2018: Jackson State
- 2019: Mississippi State (AHC/TE)
- 2020–2022: Mississippi State (AHC/NB)
- 2023: Mississippi State (AHC/RB)

Head coaching record
- Overall: 9–19

Tony Hughes (born May 22, 1959) is an American football coach and former player. He most recently served as the associate head coach and running backs coach at Mississippi State University.

He served as the head football coach at Jackson State University from 2016 to 2018.
