= 2016 Celebration Bowl =

2016 Air Force Reserve Celebration Bowl
- 2nd Celebration Bowl
North Carolina Central Eagles	Grambling State Tigers
(9–2)	(11–1)
MEAC	SWAC
9	10
Head coach: Jerry Mack	Head coach: Broderick Fobbs
STATS 20	STATS 16
	1	2	3	4	Total
North Carolina Central	3	0	0	6	9
Grambling State	0	0	10	0	10
- Date: December 17, 2016
- Season: 2016
- Stadium: Georgia Dome
- Location: Atlanta, Georgia
- MVP: Offense: #4 TE Martez Carter, Grambling; Defense: #33 DB Jameel Jackson, Grambling
- Referee: Marvel July (Mtn. West)
- Attendance: 31,096
- Payout: US$1,000,000 (Per Conference)

United States TV coverage
- Network: ABC; RedVoice, LLC
- Announcers: Mark Neely, Jay Walker, & Tiffany Greene (ABC); Sam Crenshaw, Hugh Douglas, & Lericia Harris (RedVoice)
- Nielsen ratings: 1.83 (Viewers)

The 2016 Celebration Bowl (officially known as the 2016 Air Force Reserve Celebration Bowl) was a post-season American college football bowl game played on December 17, 2016, at the Georgia Dome in Atlanta, Georgia. The second Celebration Bowl game matched the champion of the Mid-Eastern Athletic Conference, against the champion of the Southwestern Athletic Conference, the two historically black division I conferences. This was the last edition of the Celebration Bowl (and the penultimate college football game) played at the Georgia Dome, as the Dome was demolished in November 2017 following the opening of its successor, Mercedes-Benz Stadium, three months prior. The third and future editions of the Celebration Bowl were moved to the new stadium.

== Teams ==
The participants for the Celebration Bowl game are based upon the final regular season standings which determine the MEAC football champion and the SWAC football championship Game determining the SWAC representative.

=== North Carolina Central ===
North Carolina Central entered the season ranked 4th in both the Sheridan & BoxtoRow polls and was picked to finish 3rd overall in the MEAC. The Eagles started their season with back to back losses to FBS opponents Duke and Western Michigan. The Eagles rebounded to win 9 straight, defeating state rival North Carolina A&T in the final MEAC regular season game. The Eagles entered the Celebration Bowl ranked #18 in the FCS.

=== Grambling ===
Grambling started the season ranked 5th in national black college football polls and picked 2nd in the SWAC Western division. The Tigers began the season defeating Virginia-Lynchburg and going up 21–0 before watching FBS opponent Arizona rally to defeat them. Grambling rolled after that with 10 straight wins. The Tigers enter the Celebration Bowl ranked #14.

== Game summary ==
=== Scoring summary ===
Scoring summary

Quarter	Time	Drive			Team	Scoring information	Score	
Quarter	Time	Plays	Yards	TOP	Team	Scoring information	NCCU	Grambling
1	6:05	13	74	6:40	NCCU	23-yard field goal by Brandon McLaren	3	0
3	9:14	8	70	3:35	Grambling	Martez Carter 32-yard touchdown run, Jonathan Wallace kick good	3	7
3	2:50	4	16	2:11	Grambling	26-yard field goal by Jonathan Wallace	3	10
4	2:14	5	59	1:49	NCCU	Quentin Atkinson 39-yard touchdown reception from Malcolm Bell, Haiden McCraney kick blocked	9	10
"TOP" = time of possession. For other American football terms, see Glossary of American football.							9	10

=== Statistics ===
Statistics	NCCU	Grambling
First downs	14	21
Total offense, plays – yards	62–301	75–345
Rushes-yards (net)	29–55 (1.9)	44–196 (4.5)
Passing yards (net)	246	149
Passes, Comp-Att-Int	19–33–2	15–31–1
Time of Possession	27:21	32:29
