= Tiny Bubbles =

Single by Don Ho

from the album Tiny Bubbles
- B-side: "Do I Love You?"
- Released: 1966
- Recorded: 1966
- Genre: Traditional pop
- Length: 2:45
- Label: Reprise
- Songwriter: Leon Pober
- Producer: Sonny Burke

"Tiny Bubbles" is a song written by Leon Pober and performed by Don Ho. It comes from the album of the same name. The single peaked at #57 on the Billboard Hot 100 and #14 on the Easy Listening charts in March 1967. By 1968, "Tiny Bubbles" was covered about 34 times. It was considered to be Ho's signature song.

== Production ==
The song was requested by producer Sonny Burke after Ho couldn't successfully perform the song "Born Free". "Tiny Bubbles" was originally written for Lawrence Welk, since he tended to perform "champagne music". Welk turned it down, although he later performed the song several times on his television show after it became a hit.

== Legacy ==
"Tiny Bubbles" was considered to be Ho's signature song. During one performance, after nearly thousands, Ho reportedly quipped "God, I hate that song".

- The second season of the American game show The Mole incorporated the song in a creative way - one test had a contestant confined to sleeping or staying on a bed while "Tiny Bubbles" was played on repeat in various versions (sped up, slowed down, backwards, etc). Fans believe it is an iconic moment of the short-lived series.
- It was featured in the 2001 film Bubble Boy.
- Alongside Ho's other songs, "E Le Ka Lei Lei (Beach Party Song)" and "Wish They Didn't Mean Goodbye", "Tiny Bubbles" was featured in the Season 7 Hawaii Five-0 episode, "Elua la ma Nowemapa".
- The song alone was also featured in the Season 3 episode, "Mohai".

== Covers ==
- In 1966, Billy Vaughn released an instrumental cover and charted at #31 in the Bubbling Under Hot 100 Singles chart.
- In 1967, Roger Williams performed a piano version on the album, Roger!
- In 1968, American country singer Rex Allen released a cover, which peaked at #71 in the Billboard country charts.
- In 1974, Scottish country singer Sydney Devine performed "Tiny Bubbles" for his album, Encores; it is considered to be his signature song.
- Others who have done renditions of the tune included Al Caiola, Nora Aunor and Tiny Tim.
