= Hawaii (Elmer Bernstein song) =

Song by Elmer Bernstein

from the album Hawaii
- Released: 1966
- Recorded: 1966
- Genre: Film scores
- Length: 2:13
- Label: United Artists Records
- Songwriter(s): Elmer Bernstein (music); Mack David (lyrics)
- Producer(s): Bobby Helfer

Hawaii (also known as I am Hawaii) was a 1966 theme song composed by Elmer Bernstein for the 1966 film of the same name. After the film's release, Mack David added lyrics to the song in October 1966. The song was subsequently recorded by such as Don Ho (for the 1966 album, Tiny Bubbles) and Cathy Foy (in a medley with "Follow Me" from the 1962 film, Mutiny on the Bounty), the winner of the 1975 Miss Hawaii pageant. Foy's record received greater national attention when it accompanied Angela Perez Baraquio's hula performance on Miss America 2001 before Baraquio became Miss America. The song also recorded by Henry Mancini for his 1966 album, "Music of Hawaii". It peaked at #6 on Billboard's Adult Contemporary chart.

== In popular culture ==
- Don Ho's recording was featured in the Season 8 Hawaii Five-0 episode, "Make Me Kai".
