= Craig Slike =

American actor

- Occupation(s): Actor, graphic artist

Craig Slike is an American actor and graphic artist. He acted in the film Skid Marks, and played the role of "The Mole" in the fifth season of ABC's summer reality TV series The Mole. Craig is passionate about helping places devastated by natural disasters. Two places in which he has helped are with tsunami relief in Thailand and Earthquake relief in Turkey.

== Filmography ==
Year	Film	Role	Other notes
2007	Skid Marks	Frat Party Guy	
