= The Mole (American TV series) season 5 =

The Mole
- Season 5
- Presented by: Jon Kelley
- No. of contestants: 12
- Winner: Mark Lambrecht
- Runner-up: Nicole Williams
- Location: Chile; Argentina
- The Mole: Craig Slike
- No. of episodes: 11

Release
- Original network: ABC
- Original release: June 2 – August 11, 2008

Season chronology
- ← Previous; Season 4 Next → Season 6 (on Netflix)

The fifth season of the American version of The Mole began airing on ABC on June 2, 2008, after being pushed back a week by ABC. Casting information was announced online.

After the fourth season in 2004, ABC declined to pick up The Mole, and Stone Stanley Entertainment lost the rights to the show from Belgian company TTTI. In August 2007, Scott Stone of Stone & Co. Entertainment (the new name for Stone Stanley Entertainment after David Stanley left in 2004) re-secured the rights to the show, and with ABC in January 2008, announced the show's return to American television.

== Show details ==
The show returned to its original civilian format for the fifth season. The winner could win a maximum of $500,000 (compared to $1,000,000 of the first two civilian seasons), and the total offered in all of the missions exceeded $850,000, although the team only earned $420,000.

Jon Kelley was hired as the new host, and filming began the week of March 23, 2008 in Chile.

== Contestants ==
Player	Age	Hometown	Occupation	Education	Game Status
Craig Slike	30	San Diego, California	Graphic designer	B.A. Graphic Art, PLNU	The Mole
Mark Lambrecht	42	Mukwonago, Wisconsin	High school history teacher Soccer coach	B.A., University of Wisconsin–Whitewater	Winner
Nicole Williams	33	Chicago, Illinois	OBGYN	MD, Loyola University Stritch School of Medicine	9th Executed
Paul Grassi	29	Yonkers, New York	Utility worker On-air talent	Attended Pace University	8th Executed
Clay Cauley	32	West Grove / Philadelphia	Criminal litigation attorney	Law Degree, Howard University	7th Executed
Alex Jacobs	31	Haverford, Pennsylvania	Musician	Attended University of Colorado	6th Executed
Kristen Willeumier	35	Santa Monica, California	Neuroscientist, Model, Equestrian	PhD, UCLA	5th Executed
Victoria Garza	26	Bishop, Texas	Retail manager	B.A., Texas A&M University–Kingsville	4th Executed
Bobby O'Donnell	25	Manayunk, Philadelphia	Restaurant manager	B.A., Penn State	3rd Executed
Ali Sonoma	24	St. Louis, Missouri	Spokesmodel/Actress; Former UFC octagon girl	A.A., St. Louis Community College	Bribed
Liz Cain	60	Whitefish, Montana	Retired	Associate's degree, New Mexico Tech	2nd Executed
Marcie Ciscel	31	Corona, California	Stay-at-home mom	West High School, Torrance, California	1st Executed

== Execution chart ==
Color key:

Winner
The Mole
Runner-up
Earned or claimed exemption
Tied for lowest score
Executed
Accepted bribe

	Episode 1	Episode 2	Episode 3	Episode 4	Episode 5	Episode 7	Episode 8	Episode 9	Episode 11 Final
Quiz	1	2	3 (Note: During the execution ceremony in episode 3, Ali accepted a revised bribe of $30,000 (an increase from the original bribe of $20,000), causing her to withdraw from the game. Despite the withdrawal, the execution ceremony continued, with Bobby becoming the third player to be executed. This was the first instance in the American version of the franchise where two contestants exited the game.)	4	5	6	7	8	9
Starting value	$0	$35,000	$63,000	$129,000	$152,000	$177,000	$251,000	$331,000	$368,500
Money earned	$35,000	$28,000	$66,000	$23,000	$25,000	$74,000	$80,000	$37,500	$51,500
Total value	$35,000	$63,000	$129,000	$152,000	$177,000	$251,000	$331,000	$368,500	$420,000
Mark	Safe	Exempt	Safe	Safe	Safe	Safe	Safe	Exempt	Winner (Episode 11)
Craig	Safe	Safe	Safe	Safe	Exempt	Safe	Safe	Safe	The Mole (Episode 11)
Nicole	Exempt	Safe	Safe	Safe	Safe	Safe	Safe	Safe	Runner-up (Episode 11)
Paul	Safe	Exempt	Safe	Safe	Safe	Safe	Safe	Executed	Executed (Episode 9)
Clay	Safe	Safe	Safe	Exempt	Safe	Safe	Executed	Executed (Episode 8)	
Alex	Safe	Safe	Safe	Safe	Safe	Executed	Executed (Episode 7)		
Kristen	Safe	Exempt	Safe	Safe	Executed	Executed (Episode 5)			
Victoria	Safe	Safe	Safe	Executed	Executed (Episode 4)				
Bobby	Safe	Safe	Executed	Executed (Episode 3)					
Ali	Safe	Safe	Accepted bribe (Episode 3)						
Liz	Safe	Executed	Executed (Episode 2)						
Marcie	Executed	Executed (Episode 1)							
Exemptions	Nicole	Mark, Paul, Kristen	(none)	Clay	Craig	Not earned	(none)	Mark	(none)
Executed	Marcie; Lowest score	Liz; Lowest score	Bobby; Lowest score	Victoria; Slowest time	Kristen; Slowest time	Alex; Lowest score	Clay; Slowest time	Paul; Slowest time	Craig; The Mole
Executed	Marcie; Lowest score	Liz; Lowest score	Bobby; Lowest score	Victoria; Slowest time	Kristen; Slowest time	Alex; Lowest score	Clay; Slowest time	Paul; Slowest time	Nicole; 13 correct answers
Executed	Marcie; Lowest score	Liz; Lowest score	Bobby; Lowest score	Victoria; Slowest time	Kristen; Slowest time	Alex; Lowest score	Clay; Slowest time	Paul; Slowest time	Mark; 17 correct answers

== Episodes ==
=== Episode 1 ===
Episode 1 recapOriginal airdate: June 2, 2008Location: Los Ángeles, Chile
Mission	Money earned	Possible earnings
Over the Falls	$20,000	$60,000
Robinson Crusoe	$15,000	$25,000
Current Pot	$35,000	$85,000

Exemption
Nicole	Stranded after "Crusoe" mission

Execution
Marcie	1st player executed

Over the Falls: The players were asked, by secret ballot, who they thought the Mole was based on first impressions. Marcie was chosen and it was revealed that she would have control over the upcoming game. While wearing a safety harness, the remaining players each rode a raft over Laja Falls and had to try to grab a bag hanging over the edge of the falls. Of the eleven bags, six had real money, while the other five had worthless paper. It was Marcie's task to secretly assign which six players would be jumping for real money. Each bag of real money grabbed added $10,000 to the pot. Of the six players who successfully grabbed a bag, only two had real money, so $20,000 was added to the pot. Marcie then had to choose four players to sleep outside, rather than in a cabin with the other eight. Nicole, who was chosen to sleep outside, complained about the decision, and decided to stay awake all night inside the cabin to avoid breaking the rules.

Robinson Crusoe: The players were taken to a beach and told the story of Alexander Selkirk, who was stranded in Chile in 1704, and inspired Robinson Crusoe. The goal of this mission was to find five items that Selkirk had with him. Nicole, who was voted the "whiniest" player, divided the remaining players into three groups: six "scavengers" who searched the beach for as many of 45 hidden items as they could find, a group of three "appraisers" who decided which of the found items were correct, and two "timekeepers" who could give the others more time by refilling a giant hourglass with sand as it ran down; when it was empty, the mission ended. The appraisers were allowed three guesses at the five items, and were told after the first two guesses how many items were correct, but not which ones. For each correct item found, $5,000 was added to the pot. Three correct items were found for a total of $15,000. Nicole, as "whiniest", was then "stranded" on the beach while the remaining contestants went to their hotel. This caused her to be exempt from execution, as she could not take the quiz while she was "stranded".

=== Episode 2 ===
Episode 2 recapOriginal airdate: June 9, 2008Location: Santiago & Pomaire, Chile
Mission	Money earned	Possible earnings
Race to the Summit	$0	$35,000
When Pigs Fly	$28,000	$50,000
Current Pot	$63,000	$170,000

Exemptions
Mark & Kristen	Won the "Summit" mission
Paul	Exemption found in "Pigs" mission

Execution
Liz	2nd player executed

Race to the Summit: The players were asked to split themselves into groups of nine "goal-oriented" people, and two who see life as an "uphill battle" (Mark and Kristen were chosen as the latter). The two teams had to race to the top of Cerro San Cristóbal: The "uphill battle" team were given a tandem bicycle to ride, while the "goal-oriented" team were to ride up by gondola lift, but had to first score a goal in a soccer match against a children's team to earn their tickets. After twenty minutes of play, the team was allowed penalty kicks to score. They would then have to travel on foot to the lift. If they beat the "uphill battle" team to the summit, the team would add $35,000 to the pot. If they did not, the "uphill battle" team would earn exemptions from the quiz.

The bike's chain slipped off its gears several times, causing Mark to decide to walk the bike for part of the trip. Jon Kelley waited partway up the hill with pisco sours for Mark and Kristen, and offered them the opportunity to take a taxicab for a $5,000 deduction from the pot, which Mark quickly refused.

The "goal-oriented" team finally scored with penalty kicks, and made their way to the gondolas. The faster players raced ahead and took the first gondola, while several slower players lagged behind and took a second gondola. Upon arrival at the top of the hill, they found that Mark and Kristen had beaten them.

When Pigs Fly: The players split into three groups of three and one group of two. The groups of three had to search the town for 50 hidden clay pigs with a Mole thumbprint on them. They then had to return to an outdoor arena with the pigs and use a large slingshot to launch the fragile pigs towards the two-player team, who had to catch the pigs with a blanket without damaging them. For each unbroken pig returned, $1,000 was added to the pot. Jon Kelley started the group off by leaving one free pig on the scoring table, worth $1,000. The time limit was set by two local potters creating clay pigs at the arena. Once they had finished 12 new pigs (a timeframe of roughly an hour), the mission ended. An additional exemption was also announced, but was left for the players to figure out.

Liz and Paul were the group of two. While waiting for the others to return, Paul smashed open the one free pig, forfeiting $1,000. Inside he found a chip which earned him an exemption. Two of the groups brought back 18 and 26 pigs respectively. Bobby could not run and was carried in his team's wheelbarrow for the entire task; his team did not recover any pigs. Twenty-eight pigs were successfully launched and caught, for a total of $28,000 added to the pot.

=== Episode 3 ===
Episode 3 recapOriginal airdate: June 16, 2008Location: Santiago, Chile
Mission	Money earned	Possible earnings
Fruit of the Luge	$26,000	$70,000
Dress Code	$40,000	$50,000
Current Pot	$129,000	$290,000

Bribe
Ali	$20,000 (declined), $30,000 (accepted)

Execution
Bobby	3rd player executed

Fruit of the Luge: The players were asked to split themselves into two groups of five who "can't trust anyone" (Paul, Victoria, Kristen, Clay, Alex) and five who "trust blindly" (Bobby, Ali, Craig, Nicole, Mark); then they were asked to get into pairs of one player from each group. Each pair would two-person luge down a steel luge course. The "can't trust anyone" player would be in front, controlling the braking lever blindfolded, and the "trust blindly" player would be in back, telling their partner when to slow down. In addition, seven drawings of different fruits were arranged along the course. The "trust blindly" player had to relay each fruit to their partner, before the finish line. After the finish line, the teams couldn't talk. After the luge, the "can't trust anyone" player had to arrange actual fruits in the same order as the images, choosing from a table full of fruit. Each fruit in the correct position added $2,000 to the pot.

Clay got 5/7 correct, only flipping the order of two fruits despite Bobby's failure to relay the color of several fruits, and mistaking an avocado for a pear; Paul got 5/7 correct from Ali, also flipping the order of two fruits; Victoria got 7/7 from Craig; Kristen got 7/7 from Mark; Alex got 1/7 by placing the first fruit twice, having heard Nicole repeat it, thus pushing all the remaining fruits back one spot. The team totaled 25/35 and would have added $50,000 to the pot; however, both Clay and Bobby, and Victoria and Craig discussed the fruits after crossing the finish line and the $24,000 they earned was negated. The team ultimately added $26,000 to the pot.

Dress Code: The team was brought to a spa to relax. While they were enjoying the services, Kelley took their clothes other than their shoes to be dry cleaned. The team was told to split into two groups of three and two groups of two. The groups were then given the address of a restaurant across town and informed they had less than two and a half hours to get there. Players, dressed only in underwear, also had to meet the restaurant's dress code of a dress shirt, tie, and pants for men, and two shirt layers with a skirt or pants for women. The team had to get clothes from locals en route to the restaurant. Each player that arrived properly dressed added $5,000 to the pot.

Clay and Mark opted not to participate at the start of the mission. Alex used his fluency in Spanish to get clothes for himself and Paul, and Paul completed their outfits when he met some fellow New Yorkers. Ali, Kristen, and Victoria got shirts from several men and found a lady with three spare pairs of pants. Craig noticed a laundromat and saw envelopes with the players' names on them, realizing that the shop had their dry cleaned clothes. He, Bobby, and Nicole thus wore their own clothes and brought the others' clothes to the restaurant. All eight players that participated arrived, adding $40,000 to the pot. (Kelley then revealed that the cards bearing the address of the restaurant also had the address of the laundromat printed, in Roman Numeral "code," at the bottom, where a copyright statement would normally be present.)

Execution Bribe: Just prior to the quiz results being read, $20,000 was offered to the first player who would agree to quit the game. No one accepted the offer, and Kristen's, Mark's, and Victoria's results were read (though not formally shown in the episode, Paul also appeared as green on the screen, indicating he was declared safe during this time). Then, an increased bribe of $30,000 was offered to all players, including those who were already shown their safe results. Ali ultimately accepted the second bribe. The group was informed Ali would have been safe, but that the execution would continue; Bobby became the Mole's third victim.

=== Episode 4 ===
Episode 4 recapOriginal airdate: June 23, 2008Location: Uspallata, Argentina
Mission	Money earned	Possible earnings
Midas Rush	$14,250	$50,000
Bonus (see text)	$750	—
Who Said That	$8,000	$14,000
Current Pot	$152,000	$354,000

Exemption
Clay	Agreed by his team in the "Midas Rush" mission

Execution
Victoria	4th player executed (tie quiz score, slower time by five seconds)

Midas Rush: The teams were asked to split into teams of four "selfish" players and four "selfless" players. The players were given 50 minutes to carry as many of 200 five-pound gold-colored bricks as possible approximately 2,800 feet up to the top of the 10,000-foot mountain they were brought to, provided only with backpacks. The mission was inspired by the Spanish conquistadors, who historically forced the Incas to transport gold to Spanish ships for shipping back to Spain. Each brick transported added $250 to the pot. Each team had to arrive together at the same time to complete the mission. The team that arrived first would also receive an exemption.

The Selfish team (Victoria, Nicole, Clay and Kristen) took a light load of 23 bricks, hoping to finish faster. The Selfless team (Paul, Alex, Craig and Mark) took a fuller load of 38 bricks, with Mark explaining that they already knew they were the weaker team and would probably finish last. At the halfway point, Kelley waited along the path to tell the teams they also needed to carry a scale. The Selfish team arrived first and had a choice of scales. Without the benefit of lifting the scales, they chose the one that weighed ten pounds, leaving the twenty pound scale behind for the Selfless team. Mark had to leave four bricks behind to carry the scale, reducing the team to 34 bricks.

The Selfish team reached the top first, while the Selfless team arrived with only half a minute to go. The teams brought up 57 bricks for a total of $14,250 out of a possible $50,000. Kelley then announced that the Selfish players would have to unanimously decide which of them would get the exemption; if they could not decide, both the exemption and all of their money would be forfeited. The initial inclination was to vote Kristen, but Clay argued that he had not had an exemption, and the group relented after he agreed to return the favour to Kristen in the future. Craig was taken by ambulance to hospital after the mission when he experienced symptoms of altitude sickness and hypothermia. He returned to the team later with orders to rest.

Before the next mission began, Kelley added $750 to the pot to round up the awkward value from this mission.

Who Said That: During dinner, Kelley took the players' journals and wrote down seven of the comments written in them which referred to another player. He then returned the journals, and began reading the comments one at a time. The player who the comment referred to had to guess which player had written the comment without any signalling from the other players. Each correct answer was worth $2,000. Players were not told the correct author when they guessed incorrectly. Craig did not participate in this mission.

The team correctly guessed 4/7 questions, and earned a fifth question after Kelly offered the opportunity for the author of the final comment (Victoria) to identify himself or herself. However, the team lost one question because Nicole made signals by coughing and fluttering her eyelashes for the comment that she authored. Nicole also initially offered no guess at the author of her comment, saying only "I don't know" before Kelley asked her to guess. The team thus earned $8,000 out of a possible $14,000.

After dinner, Kelley took the team (without Craig) outside to a bonfire and asked if any player was willing to sacrifice their journal. He told the team to agree on one player. Several players offered their journals, believing the reward would be an exemption. Paul, Alex and Nicole played "rock, paper, scissors" and Alex won. He offered up his journal, but Kelley instead burned the remaining players' journals. Mark, who had been rigorous about writing every detail in his journal was visibly upset. Craig was later revealed to be able to keep his journal in compensation for not having details about the mission he missed.

=== Episode 5 ===
Episode 5 recapOriginal airdate: June 30, 2008Location: Uspallata & Mendoza, Argentina
Mission	Money earned	Possible earnings
All for One	$25,000	$25,000
Travelers	$0	$30,000
Current Pot	$177,000	$409,000

Exemptions
None	Not taken during "All For One"
Craig	Prevented success in "Travelers" mission

Execution
Kristen	5th player executed (tie quiz score, slower time by one second)

All for One: The players were taken to an abandoned train station, and were chained together to the outside of a barred cell by their ankles. Across from them was another cell which held the key to their chains, and would open once every ten minutes. By leaning against the bars they were chained to, the players could allow enough slack in the chain for one of them to reach the key.

The player who reaches the key was only allowed to free themselves, leaving the remaining players to wait for the next time the cell opened. If all of the players escaped before sunrise, $25,000 would be added to the pot. However, the cell with the key also contained an exemption card. If the player getting the key also took the exemption card, no money would be added to the pot, and the remaining players would have to remain chained all night. Players who were unchained received a meal and comfortable bed, while players who remained chained had to spend the night in the cold.

The team allowed Craig to go first, due to his poor health. They then allowed Kristen to go, with Clay having promised her to return a favor after letting him have exemption in the Midas Rush mission. Paul was allowed to go after he swore on his daughter. Clay went next after he couldn't get Mark to promise not to take the exemption. Nicole left after she convinced Mark she was being honest. Alex let Mark decide whether he wanted to leave first, and Mark told Alex to go. Finally, Mark weighed the two options, and ultimately decided not to take the exemption.

Travelers: The group split into teams of two and had to travel five and a half miles to the Cerro de la Gloria statue in 45 minutes. Each team which arrived added $10,000 to the pot. Each team had to travel using a different form of transportation. The seventh player was the "captain" in charge of splitting up the groups and assigning the form of transportation. Craig won the position by being the first player to say the word "exemption" during breakfast. He was also promised an exemption if none of the teams arrived in time.

Craig was shown a variety of transportation methods, from difficult to use stilts to relatively quick scooters. Craig decided to go for the exemption; he assigned Mark to wear a scuba outfit and Alex to dress up as a conquistador and bring a donkey he couldn't ride; he teamed Clay on a unicycle with Kristen on stilts; finally, he teamed Nicole and Paul to make the trip in a llama costume, with fierce rivals Nicole (whose vanity had annoyed the group) at Paul (whose rudeness had annoyed the group) asked to team up as the llama's head and rear, respectively. Clay later said in an interview that the move was "almost Shakespearian."

Mark and Kristen did not want to be humiliated and tried to get everyone to opt out of the challenge; Paul and Nicole agreed, and with their teammates refusing, Clay and Alex had no choice. Jon Kelley and Craig waited at the midpoint for the players, with a possible offer, but the teams never arrived. The players ultimately took their vans to the statue, and Craig received an exemption.

=== The Mole: Take a Closer Look ===
The series took a week off due to July 4 weekend and to provide additional airtime for The Bachelorette season finale. The series resumed July 14 with a doubleheader. A special hour-long episode subtitled Take A Closer Look aired just prior to Episode 6. It featured a recap of the first half of the season, and various never-before-seen footage from the first five weeks.

=== Episode 6 ===
Episode 6 recapOriginal airdate: July 14, 2008Location: Mendoza, Argentina
Mission	Money earned	Possible earnings
The Grapes of Cache	$70,000	$70,000
Swing Out	$4,000	$60,000
Current Pot	$251,000	$539,000

Exemptions
None	Unearned during "Swing Out."

Execution
Alex	6th player executed

The Grapes of Cache: The players were taken to a vineyard and asked to split themselves into two groups of three "Runners" (Mark, Alex and Clay) and three "Thinkers" (Nicole, Craig and Paul). The Runners chose Mark as their best athlete, and the Thinkers chose Paul as the best communicator. Seven bottles of Malbec wine were hidden throughout the vineyard, each worth $10,000 for the pot if found and returned.

The two remaining Thinkers had to answer seven multiple choice brain teasers; each answer correspond with multiple options of GPS coordinates where a bottle was located. The Thinkers had to tell Paul, who could them tell the two remaining Runners (armed with GPS devices) the coordinates via mobile phone. The time limit for the challenge was controlled by Mark who had to run on a treadmill. Every time a bottle was found, the treadmill would increase speed. The mission ended when Mark stopped running. Paul was not allowed to help the Thinkers, but Mark was.

Mark ended up answering most of the questions correctly while running on the treadmill, with Nicole offering several wrong answers, much to the annoyance of Paul. The Thinkers answered all of the questions within 22 minutes, but it took more time to find each bottle than to answer the questions. The Runners took almost 30 minutes more to find the remaining bottles, and managed to return with them after 53 minutes to add $70,000 to the pot.

Swing Out: The group was brought to a 90-foot high bridge over the Mendoza River. Each player, one at a time, had to bungee jump off the bridge and throw a bag of Mate leaves onto a target on the shore below. The square target had rings worth $4,000, $6,000, and $8,000, with a $10,000 bullseye; the team could add up to $60,000 to the pot by each hitting a bullseye.

Each player was also asked before their jump what they thought the group total would be; the player who guessed closest without going over earned an exemption. All players decided to jump, but the only player to hit the target was Alex for $4,000. Everybody's guess for the group total was over $4,000, so no one earned the exemption.

=== Episode 7 ===
Episode 7 recapOriginal airdate: July 21, 2008Location: Mendoza & Buenos Aires, Argentina
Mission	Money earned	Possible earnings
Go Figure	$30,000	$30,000
Ticket to Ride	$50,000	$50,000
Current Pot	$331,000	$619,000

Execution
Clay	7th player executed (tie quiz score, slower time)

Go Figure: The players were asked to split themselves into two groups of three "smart" players (Paul, Clay and Mark) and two "dumb" players (Craig and Nicole). Each team was given a set of clues leading to various locations around the city of Mendoza. Information found at the locations would be used by the players to compute several numbers. The teams had to return to the starting point and enter the numbers into a computer from memory, without writing them down. The three smart players had three numbers to remember, while the two dumb players (who were deemed dumb for having chosen the dumb team) had to remember five. If all of the answers were entered correctly, the team added $30,000 to the pot. The team had 70 minutes to complete the task.

Paul got the smart team lost but they managed to return in time to enter their numbers. One of the dumb team's numbers, however, was incorrect. One of the players was permitted 20 minutes to recalculate that number and reenter it. The team chose Nicole to go, but when she returned with another answer, the team knew it was incorrect, based on which digits were shown to be incorrect in the previous guess. However, Clay managed to deduce a pattern in the numbers, and determined the correct number. (Although it was not explicitly stated, the numbers were all numbers in the Fibonacci sequence.)

Ticket to Ride: The players were each asked which other player they trusted the most. They were then told that one of their friends or family members were in the city. The players were taken to the Los Incas Metro station to await their loved ones, and perform the mission.

One at a time, each player was given three minutes to go over the answers to thirty questions about their loved one with the player they chose as "most trusted". Kelley then asked that player five of the questions; if they could give the correct answers to at least three questions, their partner got to see and spend time with their loved one, and they added $10,000 to the pot. All five players succeeded, and the team added $50,000 to the pot.

=== Episode 8 ===
Episode 8 recapOriginal airdate: July 28, 2008Location: Buenos Aires, Argentina
Mission	Money earned	Possible earnings
How's the View	$22,500	$64,000
Cell Out	$15,000	$45,000
Current Pot	$368,500	$728,000

Exemption
Mark	Sniped Craig in "Cell Out"

Execution
Paul	8th player executed (tie quiz score, slower time by four seconds)

How's the View: The players were asked to choose two players who consider themselves "Young at Heart", (Paul and Craig) and then asked to split into two pairs, each having one Young at Heart member. (Paul with Mark and Nicole with Craig). The Young at Heart player wore goggles which displayed a live video image from a camcorder operated by their teammate. The cameraperson had to guide their teammate through a series of challenges designed for children. The teammates were always positioned opposite each other, so the goggles would display a mirrored image of the task at hand. The cameraperson also could not speak to their partner.

Each team's first task was to put three shaped blocks into a cube with correspondingly shaped holes, each cube was worth $1,000; each team completed six cubes, but Nicole responded to a question Craig asked, which resulted in a penalty; the total earned was $5,000. The second task was to kick two soccer balls into a goal. Each ball was worth $4,500; but neither team scored. The third task was to fill up four teacups to a given level without spilling any tea outside the saucer. Each cup was worth $2,500; Paul filled three, but spilled a drop on one cup and Craig filled three, but spilled on two, for a total of $7,500. The final task departed from the kid's level; the Young at Heart player had to cross a plank from one rooftop to another, pick up a piece of chalk at the midpoint, and copy a phrase on a chalkboard at the other side. Only Paul succeeded, adding $10,000 to the pot.

Cell Out: The players were each sequestered in a different locked cell. On the wall of each cell were the words "cell" and "mole", forming a doublet puzzle. The players had to change one letter in "cell" to form a new English word, and do the same to the resulting word to get third word which was one letter away from "mole". The first player to solve this puzzle was released from their cell and became the "sniper" in a paintball obstacle course. The remaining players, once they completed the doublet puzzle, had to complete the obstacle course without getting shot; doing so added $15,000 to the pot each. However, if the sniper shoots the player carrying the game's exemption (not told to the players in advance), they earn an exemption; otherwise, no one earned it.

Mark ended up figuring the puzzle out first in under a minute; he managed to snipe Craig and Nicole, but Paul got through the course, adding $15,000 to the pot. The player holding the exemption, which was determined by the players' choice of cell, was held by Craig, meaning Mark earned an exemption.

=== Episode 9 ===
Episode 9 recapOriginal airdate: August 4, 2008Location: Buenos Aires, Argentina
Mission	Money earned	Possible earnings
Tick Tock Boom	$50,000	$50,000
Three to Tango	$0	$75,000
Bonus (see text)	$1,500	—
Final Pot	$420,000	$853,000

Tick Tock Boom: The players were led to a room containing $50,000 in a bulletproof glass box. The box also contained a bomb which was set to detonate in one hour. The team had to defuse the bomb before it detonated in order to add the money to the pot. Also in the room were pieces to a puzzle which would tell the players how to defuse the bomb. Most of the pieces were in plain sight, but the players had to discover one hidden clue: A map of the world showing the time zone divisions. Two players were required to hold down ropes behind the map to cause it to lower from the ceiling, so only one player could read the map at a time.

The team used the map to determine what the time would be in a provided list of 24 cities based on a time of 12:00 GMT. A giant clock in the room shone a laser pointer at a spot on the wall determined by the time the clock was set to. The team had to set the clock to each of the times found for the cities to cause the laser to point to 24 of the different letters on the wall. The letters could then be unscrambled to fill in a hangman-style puzzle with punctuation and spacing given. The completed puzzle was "Clue: Cut the wire that is red + blue".

Nicole was the first to read the map, and made several errors. Mark attempted to correct them, but the team was running out of time. Having noticed that the bomb had several colored wires, and a pair of wire cutters were provided, Mark reasoned that the clue would tell them which wire(s) to cut. On that assumption, the team deduced that the only two colors that could be made from the letters they found were "red" and "blue". However, they did not have the correct letters for the word "wire", so were unsure if they should cut two wires, red and blue, or cut the purple wire. In the end, the team cut the purple wire, which was correct, and added the money to the pot with 21 seconds to spare.

Three to Tango: The three players each received an envelope containing a clue, a map, and a mobile phone. Each had to determine a different item or food from the clue, and call Kelley to confirm it. One they were correct, Kelley assigned them a task to do at the given location or with the given food. They had to take a photo with their phone confirming their completion and send it back to Kelley in order to be given their next clue. This process repeated for three different tasks for each player. After they solved all three clues, Kelley sent the player a photo of their final destination, the Puente de la Mujer. The first player to arrive was offered a choice: To add $75,000 in the pot, or to be allowed to view "the Mole's dossier", which might or might not contain information that could help on the final quiz. Mark finished first, and decided to read the dossier.

Kelley then added $1,500 to the pot, rounding the final total up to an even $420,000.

=== Episode 10 ===
In this episode, all the contestants reunite, and both the winner and the Mole are revealed. The show also reveals the Mole's attempts at sabotage, and the hidden clues to the Mole's identity.

This episode uses the same format from The Mole 2: The Next Betrayal and Celebrity Mole: Yucatán but this time, the keys were replaced by key cards for the three locked doors with the three finalists.

Craig Slike is revealed as the Mole. Mark Lambrecht is shown to be the winner of the grand prize of $420,000, having correctly answered 17 questions on the final quiz to Nicole's 13. Moreover, Kelley revealed that examining the dossier did not materially affect the outcome: while the show did not reveal exactly what Mark saw, Kelley stated that the dossier held the answer to exactly one question on the final quiz and that both Mark and Nicole answered the question correctly.

== Mole sabotage ==
Craig's overarching strategy for sabotaging the games was to portray himself as easy-going but somewhat clumsy, so that the other players would dismiss his sabotages as genuine efforts.

Over the Falls: Craig purposely dropped the bag as he went over the falls.

Robinson Crusoe: Craig attempted to bury one of the correct items in the sand. He also saw, but did not pick up, the other correct item in the rocks near the beach.

Race to the Summit: Craig was to try to get into the "uphill battle" team, as to eventually take the exemption mid-route and deny the pot money, but was blocked. He proceeded to try to delay the soccer game as much as possible.

When Pigs Fly: Craig told Bobby to ride in the wheelbarrow after Bobby complained of a leg cramp. This meant his team did not have a place to carry the pigs.

Fruit of the Luge: Craig specifically got Victoria to talk after they were not supposed to at the end of the course, disqualifying their portion of the money (Victoria, being blindfolded, never knew when they had crossed the finish line and thus, could not have sabotaged in that manner).

Travelers: Craig chose modes of transportation for the players that would not allow them to reach the goal in the allotted time. After single-handedly ruining that mission, only Paul selected Craig as the mole on that episode's quiz.

How's the View: Craig got Nicole to inadvertently speak when she was not supposed to, thus preventing some money from entering the pot.

Cell Out: Craig had the answer to the doublet puzzle ahead of time and was to use this information to get out of the cell first and become the shooter. However, he took his time in trying to solve the puzzle (to prevent suspicion from being cast upon himself), which allowed Mark to solve it first. Using a backup plan, Craig positioned himself to be shot in order to deny money from entering the pot, as well as earn Mark an exemption.

== Hidden clues ==
Episodes included clues to the Mole's identity, the final three, or who wasn't the Mole. Some were subtle clues meant for die-hard fans to find, while others were meant to be obvious.

Episode 1: In the "Crusoe" mission, Craig delivered a clue from "the Mole", and only the Mole himself could know where it was.

Episode 2: Beautiful models were moles in the two celebrity seasons, and Ali is a model. The producers wanted to clue the viewers in that this season, the model wasn't the Mole. During the map zoom-in, there was a one-frame clue with letters reading "NOT ALI".

Episode 3: In the main title, the code next to "D.O.B." read "619262312", referring to the area codes of the final three players. 619 is San Diego (Craig), 262 includes Mukwonago (Mark), and 312 is Chicago (Nicole).

Episode 4: Three audio clips were played throughout the episode, again pointing to the final three. The first one, heard after Midas Rush as Craig's ambulance drove away, was a school bell ringing, referring to Mark's profession as a school teacher. The second, during Who Said That?, was a baby crying, indicating Nicole, who's an OBGYN. The third, Craig's distinctive laugh, was heard as the players left dinner, which Craig did not attend due to being rushed away in an ambulance earlier.

Episode 5: In All for One, there's graffiti on the wall behind Mark (coincidentally underlined by Mark's arm) reading "CRG," which stands for Craig.

Recap: All clues from the first five weeks were replayed, as well as an additional one. During the map zoom-in, the geographical coordinates for San Diego, Craig's hometown, are displayed for one frame.

Episode 6: All of Clay's interviews had the same background, two "i" sculptures, except for one interview, where he speculated that Mark was the Mole. This interview had a digitally edited background that was changed to four "i"'s. Four eyes is a nickname for someone who wears glasses, and the only such player was Craig. Also, during the execution, a barrel that said 'N2O' was shown in the background, referring to Craig's birthday, November 20.

Episode 7: In the Act 4 bumper, the words "Roja Corbata", Spanish for red tie, are hidden in the Mole thumbprint. Craig was wearing a red tie at the execution. It was revealed through additional footage on ABC's The Mole website that this tie was delivered to Craig from the producers shortly before the execution.

Episode 9: An audio clip is heard during one of the bumpers. When played backwards, it says "Craig buried Paul", a play on the Paul is dead theory referring to the previously executed player.

All episodes: Craig's name was never called during the execution ceremonies that end each episode.

== Awards ==
The Mole was nominated for a 2009 Emmy Award for Outstanding Original Main Title Theme Music. The recipient of the nomination was the composer, David Michael Frank.

== Ratings ==
#	Airdate	Rating	Share	18-49	Viewers [Live] (m)	Viewers [DVR+7] (m)
1	June 2, 2008	3.4	6	2.0/6	4.73	5.36
2	June 9, 2008	2.7	5	1.6/5	3.96	4.44
3	June 16, 2008	2.7	5	1.5/4	3.89	4.33
4	June 23, 2008	2.9	5	1.6/5	4.11	4.67
5	June 30, 2008	2.8	5	1.6/5	3.94	4.32
Special	July 14, 2008	2.0	4	1.1/3	2.96	—N/a
6	July 14, 2008	2.3	4	1.6/5	3.62	—N/a
7	July 21, 2008	2.2	4	1.4/4	3.34	—N/a
8	July 28, 2008	2.0	3	1.2/3	3.05	—N/a
9	August 4, 2008	2.1	4	1.2/4	3.06	3.58
Finale	August 11, 2008	2.0	3	1.2/3	2.97	3.09

Despite doing poorly overall in the ratings, The Mole averaged third in most-increased views each week that it was on the air, from DVR additions. The program's official website finished in the Top 10 of the most visited U.S. broadcast network TV show websites for the week ending August 16, 2008.
