= The Mole (American TV series) =

American television reality game show

- Also known as: The Mole: The Next Betrayal (2002); Celebrity Mole: Hawaii (2003); Celebrity Mole: Yucatán (2004)
- Genre: Reality game show
- Based on: De Mol by: Michiel Devlieger; Bart de Pauw; Tom Lenaerts; Michel Vanhove
- Presented by: Anderson Cooper; Ahmad Rashad; Jon Kelley; Alex Wagner; Ari Shapiro
- Theme music composer: David Michael Frank
- Country of origin: United States
- Original language: English
- No. of seasons: 7
- No. of episodes: 66

Production
- Running time: 43 minutes
- Production companies: Stone Stanley Entertainment (2001–02); Stanley Entertainment Group (2003–04); Stone & Company Entertainment (2008); T.T.T.I/Woestijnvis Productions (2001–08); Eureka Productions (2022–24)

Original release
- Network: ABC
- Release: January 9, 2001 – August 11, 2008
- Network: Netflix
- Release: October 7, 2022 – July 12, 2024

Related
- The Mole

The Mole is an American reality game show originally broadcast on ABC from 2001 to 2008, and reintroduced on Netflix in 2022. It is based on other versions of the original Belgian TV series De Mol broadcast in many countries. The Mole was produced by Stone Stanley Entertainment for its first four seasons. It was cancelled but was later picked up again after a four-year hiatus. The fifth season was produced by Stone & Co. Entertainment. Netflix picked up the show after a fourteen-year hiatus, with their iteration produced by Eureka Productions. Netflix's reboot and the sixth season overall premiered in October 2022.

Following the premise of other versions of The Mole format, the show features a group of contestants who must collaborate in a series of missions to win money towards a prize fund, which serves as the game's grand prize. However, among the group of contestants is the titular "Mole" - a secret double agent hired by the producers to sabotage the group's money-making efforts. The Mole's identity is unknown to the audience and the other players. Throughout the game and its missions, the genuine contestants must observe and discover the identity of the Mole. Contestants periodically are subject to a Quiz, the questions of which are based on direct actions and observations of the Mole. The contestant who scores lowest on the quiz is "Executed" - eliminated from the game. In the end, the player who scores best on the Final Quiz is declared the winner and is awarded the Prize Fund.

The series was hosted by Anderson Cooper for the first two season. Ahmad Rashad hosted seasons 3–4, and Jon Kelley hosted season 5.. Alex Wagner hosted the show's reboot sixth season and Ari Shapiro hosted the seventh. The third and fourth seasons featured celebrity contestants instead of average citizens.

== Format ==
=== Contestants ===
The contestants typically meet for the first time at or shortly before the start of filming, just before their first task. They are given black duffel bags with the show's thumbprint logo and their names on them in which to keep their belongings. Each contestant is also given a numbered journal; this is the only method by which contestants are permitted to record information and thoughts about the other contestants.

=== Missions ===
Each mission generally has a monetary reward towards the group pot for various levels of success. Occasionally, a mission will have a cash penalty for failure. The missions comprise various physical and/or mental challenges posed to the contestants. While most are straightforward, with the rules and stakes fully explained to all contestants, in some cases all aspects of the mission are fully explained to all contestants, increasing its difficulty. In those cases, perhaps only selected contestants are informed of the full nature of the challenge, and must work towards a different goal than the rest. In some instances, there are secret missions that only one or none of the contestants are aware of.

Some missions require every team member to complete their task for the team to earn money, while other missions award money to each contestant who finished, regardless of the others. A common requirement is for the team to divide themselves into groups based on given attributes (e.g., "leaders" & "followers," "smart" & "dumb") before they learn what the task is.

Secret missions may include "morality tests" where the players might be unexpectedly approached by a local (secretly arranged by the producers) for help. The contestants would later be informed that they won or lost the mission depending upon if they helped the person in need.

=== Penalties ===
In addition to challenges, violations of the game's rules by a player during certain seasons, such as going out after curfew or talking about a forbidden topic, can result in a deduction from the group pot as a penalty. Failing a secret "morality test" may also warrant a penalty. In some of the more difficult tasks, sometimes the players are given the opportunity to "buy" a clue(s) or "buy" extra time to complete the mission. Electing to do so takes a small amount of cash out of the amount they earn in that mission.

=== Quizzes & execution/elimination ===
At the end of each episode, all players, including the Mole, (and exempt players in the ABC iteration) take a multiple choice quiz about the identity of the Mole. The questions reflect upon a variety of observations about the Mole, including biographical information and what role(s) the Mole took during that round's mission(s). Information from discussions, which the players open up to the others about their personal lives may also be included in questions. The final question of each quiz is always "Who is the Mole?", with all remaining players' names as options.

After each quiz, players sit together for an "Execution Ceremony" (also dubbed the "Elimination Ceremony" in the Netflix iteration) to find out their results. The player who scores the lowest on the quiz is eliminated from the game ("executed", in the ABC iteration). If there is a tie for the lowest score among two or more players, the tied player who completed the quiz in the slowest elapsed time would be executed. The Mole is always safe from execution and is guaranteed to be involved in the game until the very end, though he/she can never win. The players who survive execution are not given their quiz scores or any additional information about the quizzes, and must deduce for themselves how well they are doing.

=== Game advantages ===
==== Exemptions ====
In some missions, contestants can earn or be awarded an "Exemption" from elimination. An exempt contestant receives immunity from the upcoming elimination, and advances to the next episode without being subject to the results of the quiz. In some cases, exemptions are awarded to a player(s) for their performance during a certain mission. Sometimes the exempted player is chosen by the group, whether intentionally or unintentionally. Other times, the exemption comes in the form of a temptation to deliberately fail a task and forfeit money for the group pot; or as an unexpected consolation prize for failure during a task.

Exemptions are highly coveted, and oftentimes create friction and dissention inside the group. In some cases, the exemption is a secret element of a mission, revealed only to the player(s) eligible. A player(s) may find themselves surprisingly eligible to receive an exemption by committing a simple, innocuous act such as being the last person to leave the breakfast table or eating the last piece of pie at dessert. Likewise, that player's ploy to achieving the exemption is often unbeknownst to the other players.

==== Neutralizer ====
In the second season, there was an additional element called the "Neutralizer". This prevented a contestant from being eligible for an exemption in that episode.

==== Correction ====
Introduced in season 7, the "Correction" awarded to a player corrects an incorrect answer on his/her quiz for that episode.

== Seasons ==
List of The Mole (American TV series) seasons
#	Subtitle	Broadcast details			Game details			Results			Host
#	Subtitle	Episodes	Premiere	Finale	Location	Players	The Mole	Winner	Runner up	Prize Pot	Host
ABC iteration (2001–2008)
1	—N/a	9	January 9, 2001	February 28, 2001	France; Monaco; Spain	10	Kathryn Price	Steven Cowles	Jim Morrison	$510,000	Anderson Cooper
2	The Mole: The Next Betrayal	13	September 28, 2001	August 6, 2002	Switzerland; Italy	14	Bill McDaniel	Dorothy Hui	Heather Campbell	$636,000	Anderson Cooper
3	Celebrity Mole: Hawaii	6	January 8, 2003	February 12, 2003	Hawaii	7	Frederique van der Wal	Kathy Griffin	Erik von Detten	$233,000	Ahmad Rashad
4	Celebrity Mole: Yucatán	7	January 7, 2004	February 18, 2004	Mexico	8	Angie Everhart	Dennis Rodman	Mark Curry	$222,000	Ahmad Rashad
5	—N/a	10	June 2, 2008	August 11, 2008	Chile; Argentina	12	Craig Slike	Mark Lambrecht	Nicole Williams	$420,000	Jon Kelley
Netflix iteration (2022–2024)
6	—N/a	10	October 7, 2022	October 21, 2022	Australia	12	Kesi Neblett	William Richardson	Joi Schweitzer	$101,500	Alex Wagner
7	—N/a	10	June 28, 2024	July 12, 2024	Malaysia	12	Sean Patrick Bryan	Michael O'Brien	Muna Abdulahi	$154,000	Ari Shapiro

Locations of the American version of The Mole

=== Season 1 ===
The first season of The Mole consisted of nine episodes, first aired from January 9 to February 28, 2001. It featured ten civilian contestants, one of whom was the Mole. The maximum possible value of the pot was $1,000,000, and each quiz consisted of twenty questions.

The contestants began the season in California, and traveled to France in the first episode. The remainder of the season took place in Europe, eventually traveling to Monaco, and Spain.

=== Season 2 ===
Season 2 of The Mole was subtitled The Next Betrayal. Fourteen civilian contestants, one of whom was the Mole, competed over the course of 13 episodes. The first three episodes aired September 21 to October 12, 2001, before going on hiatus until the next summer, starting again from the first episode on May 24, 2002. The season again took place in Europe, mainly featuring Switzerland and Italy. The maximum possible pot was again $1,000,000, but the quizzes were shortened to 10 questions. Various other minor format elements were changed for the second season.

=== Season 3 ===
Season 3 was billed Celebrity Mole: Hawaii and featured a cast of seven celebrities. The season, which was only six episodes long, was filmed on the Big Island of Hawaii. The possible maximum jackpot was also reduced to $250,000. The season aired from January 8 to February 12, 2003.

=== Season 4 ===
The fourth season was billed Celebrity Mole: Yucatan, and featured eight celebrity contestants, including two returning from the previous season. The season was again a short seven episodes long, and was filmed on the Yucatán Peninsula in Mexico. The season aired from January 7 to February 18, 2004.

=== Season 5 ===
The Mole returned after a four-year hiatus for a fifth season, returning to the civilian contestant format. Twelve contestants, one of whom was the mole, competed for a maximum pot of $500,000. The setting for this season was Argentina and Chile. The season aired from June 2 to August 11, 2008. This season received an Emmy nomination for best theme song composition.

=== Season 6 ===
The Mole returned after a fourteen-year hiatus for a sixth season, switching over to Netflix. The season featured twelve contestants, one of whom was the Mole. The setting for this season was Australia, with Alex Wagner as host. The season aired for three weeks from October 7 to 21, 2022.

=== Season 7 ===
A seventh season, which is the second season by Netflix, premiered on June 28, 2024. The season was hosted by Ari Shapiro and set in Malaysia.

== History ==
Following the conclusion of Season 5 of The Mole, ABC did not comment on its consideration for a sixth season. On April 8, 2009, they announced that the show had been cancelled. Fans have also created their own private site to encourage the signing of an online petition, e-mailing ABC executives, as well as sending "lemon-heads" to ABC headquarters in New York. (This is in reference to an occurrence on the fifth season of the show.) The latter of these techniques for being noticed is in reference to the successful revival of the television drama Jericho on CBS by bombarding their offices with packages of peanuts. On May 3, 2021, BuzzerBlog posted an article seeming to confirm that a show known as The Insider on casting sites is likely a new season of The Mole filming in Australia in June and July 2021. Netflix added seasons 1 and 2 of The Mole to its American streaming library in June 2021, leading to speculation they will air a new season of the series. In a three-week release, the reboot of The Mole launched on Netflix on October 7, 2022. In February 2023, Netflix renewed the series for a seventh season.

== See also ==
- De Mol (TV series) § International versions

Similar shows

- The Traitors
- Whodunnit?
