= The Mole (American TV series) season 2 =

The Mole
- Season 2
- Presented by: Anderson Cooper
- No. of contestants: 14
- Winner: Dorothy Hui
- Runner-up: Heather Campbell
- Location: Switzerland; Italy
- The Mole: Bill McDaniel
- No. of episodes: 13

Release
- Original network: ABC
- Original release: September 28, 2001 – August 6, 2002

Season chronology
- ← Previous; Season 1 Next → Season 3

The Mole: The Next Betrayal (also referred to as Mole 2: The Next Betrayal and simply Mole 2) was the second season of the American version of The Mole produced by Stone Stanley Entertainment. The second season featured a team of 14 players, one of whom was the mole.

The season debuted in September 2001 on Friday nights on ABC. However, after three weeks, it was put on hiatus, with disappointing ratings in the wake of the September 11 attacks and the Friday night death slot to blame. The producers later admitted that airing the program on Fridays was "a big mistake". The show returned in June 2002, restarting from the beginning, as a summer replacement series on Tuesdays.

Anderson Cooper returned to host, and often had a playful rapport with the contestants. In one episode, he tricked the players into thinking that there was an extra execution and taunted them after revealing the truth; in another, the contestants decided to throw him into a river following a task as a joke. In one of the games he apparently became slightly inebriated after drinking large quantities of wine with two of the players. As it had been in the first season, Cooper was unaware of the Mole's identity. On the final day of filming, he accidentally learned the identity of the Mole when he overheard a conversation by the producers.

During its summer 2002 run, Mole 2 aired opposite the first season of American Idol. Its ratings were considered a success, and thus two celebrity editions of the show were created. The Mole returned in the summer of 2008 with a third season of non-celebrity contestants, its fifth season overall.

In 2007, Bill McDaniel, who performed the role of the Mole, published a book documenting the experience.

== Show details ==
The Mole 2 was filmed over seven weeks, from June 2 to July 16, 2001, in Switzerland and Italy. The reunion show, as well as a retaping of the second execution, was recorded in Los Angeles in October 2001, shortly after the network pulled the series from the air. It was not until that time that the show participants discovered the results of the final quiz, and thus the winner. Winner Dorothy Hui did not receive her cash prize until after the final episode aired in August 2002. The Mole Bill McDaniel received a separate flat compensation for his role.

The show followed nearly the same format as the first season. The maximum possible pot attainable was again $1,000,000. However, a few minor changes were made. The most noticeable change was the expansion from ten contestants to 14. The season also expanded from nine episodes to 13 (due to the expanded cast). Exemptions (from execution) were part of the game mechanics from the first episode, and were available in nearly every episode. In the first season, exemptions were only an occasional twist. Furthermore, an additional element was added called the Neutralizer, which prevented a player from being eligible for an exemption on that particular episode. The quizzes were of the same mold, however, each quiz consisted of only ten questions (season one quizzes had twenty questions), and the television viewers were shown all ten of the quiz questions, rather than just a few selected highlights. For season 2, the contestants were also given official game Journals. In the first season, players' notes were casual ("writing on a napkin") on loose sheets.

The second season took place in only two countries (Switzerland and Italy), whereas the first season traveled through four countries. Like the first season, most of the nights were spent in hotels, and the players enjoyed full course dinners and fine wines.

During the game, Bribs' tote bag was embroidered with the name "Michael" (his actual first name), which he covered with a piece labeled "Bribs" (his nickname).

== Contestants ==
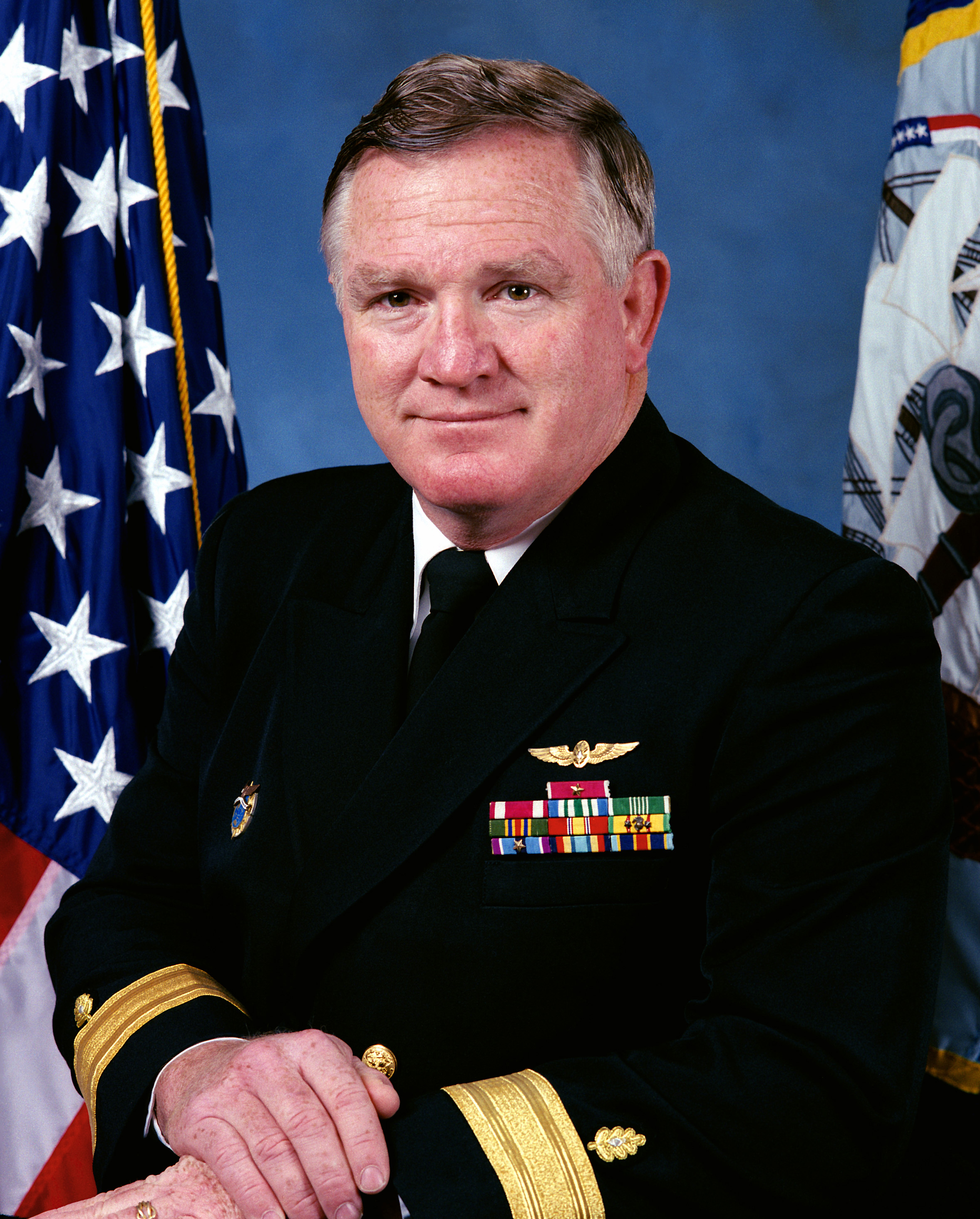
Bill McDaniel, the Mole.

Player	Age	Hometown	Occupation	Finish
Dorothy Hui	24	New York City, New York	Musician	The Winner
William "Bill" McDaniel	58	Oak Harbor, Washington	Rear admiral (retired), surgeon	The Mole
Heather Campbell	25	Dallas, Texas	PR account supervisor	The Runner-Up
Al Spielman	33	Selden, New York	Distribution manager	10th executed
Michael "Bribs" Bribiesca	23	Austin, Texas	Ski instructor	9th executed
Darwin Conner	30	New York City, New York	Attorney	8th executed
Katie Mills	25	Penacook, New Hampshire	Spanish teacher	7th executed
Elavia Bello	26	Passaic, New Jersey	Sales representative	Bribed
Myra Brown	46	San Diego, California	Airline pilot	6th executed
Rob Nelson	22	Rochester Hills, Michigan	Magician, videographer	5th executed
Patrick Guilfoyle	51	Plainsboro, New Jersey	City manager	4th executed
Lisa Noller	30	Chicago, Illinois	Asst. U.S. Attorney, Comiskey Park beer vendor	3rd executed
Ali Gorman	26	Chicago, Illinois	Nurse	2nd executed
Bob Paulhus	25	Redlands, California	Financial consultant	1st executed

== Execution chart ==
Color key:

Winner
The Mole
Runner-up
Earned or claimed exemption
Ineligible for exemption
Tied for lowest score
Saved due to a bribe
Executed
Accepted bribe

	Episode 1	Episode 2	Episode 3	Episode 4	Episode 5	Episode 6	Episode 7	Episode 8	Episode 9	Episode 10	Episode 11	Episode 13 Final
Quiz	1	2	3	4	5	6	7	8	9	10	11	12
Starting value	$0	$60,000	$56,000	$91,000	$166,000	$206,000	$236,000	$266,000	$346,000	$376,000	$486,000	$536,000
Money earned	$60,000	$18,000	$35,000	$80,000	$40,000	$40,000	$30,000	$80,000	$30,000	$110,000	$50,000	$100,000
Penalties	(none)	-$22,000	(none)		-$5,000	(none)	-$10,000	(none)				
Total value	$60,000	$56,000	$91,000	$166,000	$206,000	$236,000	$266,000	$346,000	$376,000	$486,000	$536,000	$636,000
Dorothy	Safe	Exempt	Safe	Exempt	Safe	Safe	Saved (Note: In episode 7, before the scheduled execution ceremony was to take place, Elavia was offered a bribe of $50,000. Elavia accepted the bribe, which resulted in her withdrawal from the game and the subsequent cancellation of the scheduled execution ceremony. Had the execution proceeded as planned, Dorothy would have been executed due to her having the lowest score on the quiz.)	Safe	Safe	Safe	Safe	Winner (Episode 13)
Bill	Safe	Safe	Safe	Exempt	Safe	Safe	Exempt	Safe	Safe	Safe	Safe	The Mole (Episode 13)
Heather	Safe	Safe	Safe	Safe	Safe	Safe	Safe	Safe	Safe	Safe	Safe	Runner-up (Episode 13)
Al	Safe	Safe	Exempt	Safe	Safe	Safe	Safe	Safe	Safe	Exempt	Executed	Executed (Episode 11)
Bribs	Safe	Safe	Safe	Safe	Safe	Safe	Safe	Safe	Safe	Executed	Executed (Episode 10)	
Darwin	Safe	Safe	Safe	Safe	Safe	Safe	Safe	Safe	Executed	Executed (Episode 9)		
Katie	Safe	Safe	Exempt	Safe	Safe	Safe	Safe	Executed	Executed (Episode 8)			
Elavia	Exempt	Safe	Safe	Safe	Safe	Exempt	Accepted bribe (Episode 7)					
Myra	Safe	Safe	Safe	Safe	Safe	Executed	Executed (Episode 6)					
Rob	Safe	Safe	Safe	Exempt	Executed	Executed (Episode 5)						
Patrick	Safe	Safe	Safe	Executed	Executed (Episode 4)							
Lisa	Safe	Exempt	Executed	Executed (Episode 3)								
Ali	Safe	Executed	Executed (Episode 2)									
Bob	Executed	Executed (Episode 1)										
Exemptions	Elavia	Dorothy, Lisa	Al, Katie	Dorothy, Bill, Rob	~~Heather~~ (declined)	Elavia	Bill	(none)	Not earned	Al	Not earned	(none)
Neutralized	(none)		Dorothy	(none)					Dorothy	(none)		
Executed	Bob; Slowest time	Ali; Lowest score	Lisa; Lowest score	Patrick; Lowest score	Rob; Lowest score	Myra; Slowest time	Execution cancelled	Katie; Slowest time	Darwin; Lowest score	Bribs; Lowest score	Al; Lowest score	Bill; The Mole
Executed	Bob; Slowest time	Ali; Lowest score	Lisa; Lowest score	Patrick; Lowest score	Rob; Lowest score	Myra; Slowest time	Execution cancelled	Katie; Slowest time	Darwin; Lowest score	Bribs; Lowest score	Al; Lowest score	Heather; Lowest score
Executed	Bob; Slowest time	Ali; Lowest score	Lisa; Lowest score	Patrick; Lowest score	Rob; Lowest score	Myra; Slowest time	Execution cancelled	Katie; Slowest time	Darwin; Lowest score	Bribs; Lowest score	Al; Lowest score	Dorothy; Highest score

== Episodes ==
=== Episode 1 ===
Episode 1 recapOriginal Airdate: September 28, 2001; Re-aired: May 28, 2002Location: Scuol, Switzerland
Mission	Money earned	Possible earnings
Bike/Crossbow Biathlon	$40,000	$40,000
Pulse Rope Walk	$20,000	$20,000
Swing for Life	$0	$0
Burn Bags Burn	$0	$40,000
Current Pot	$60,000	$100,000

Exemptions
Elavia	Refused to jump in "Swing for Life"

Execution
Bob	1st player executed

Born Leaders: The 14 players were all blindfolded and taken to Castle Tarasp in Switzerland. Once there, they were instructed to remove their blindfolds, meeting each other for the first time. Immediately, they were charged with selecting two players who seemed to be "Born Leaders". Those two players then chose who would take part in the next three challenges, as well as how much each challenge was worth: One challenge was worth $40,000, another $20,000, and the other $0. None of the other 12 players knew how much each challenge was worth until all three challenges are completed.

Bike/Crossbow Biathlon: Three players rode a bike down a steep incline to retrieve two arrows, then returned up the incline to the starting point where an archery target was located. Using a crossbow, each player must shoot an arrow into the center of the target (marked by the iconic thumbprint). If both arrows miss, the player had to get two more arrows. If all three players hit the target in less than 30 minutes, the game was won.

Pulse Rope Walk: Four players had one hour to traverse a tightrope suspended high off the ground. Each player was hooked up to a heart monitor; whenever the player's pulse rate exceeded 130 beats per minute, the player had to stop and wait for his/her pulse to lower in order to continue. The last player to cross had two different sets of ropes to traverse; the second set was narrower and higher off the ground. The game was a success if all four players completed their portion in under an hour total.

Swing for Life: Five players must swing by a rope off a bridge spanning over a raging river. If all five players completed the swing, the game was a success. An exemption was offered to the last player if he/she refused to swing.

Burn Bags Burn: In the hours before the challenge, the players were given journals and an opportunity to interview their fellow players to gain personal information on each other. Afterwards, they were taken to a bonfire, where their knapsacks - containing all of their belongings - were dangling over the fire. Four players were nominated and asked questions taken from their fellow players' contestant applications. If the team got all eight questions right $40,000 would be won and the luggage would be safe. If they got at least one question wrong, no money would be won. If four questions were answered incorrectly, the luggage would be lowered into the fire and destroyed. It was revealed in the next episode that the bags were fakes, and their belongings had not been destroyed.

=== Episode 2 ===
Episode 2 recapOriginal airdate: October 5, 2001; Re-aired: May 28, 2002Location: Scuol, Switzerland and St. Moritz, Switzerland
Mission	Money earned	Possible earnings
Clothesline Game	$18,000	$40,000
High Roller Game	-$20,000	$20,000
Blueberry Game	-$2,000	$0
Current Pot	$56,000	$160,000

Exemptions
Dorothy and Lisa	Succeeded in the Blueberry game

Execution
Ali	2nd player executed

Clothesline Game: The players selected two women with the most fashion sense and a man with need of fashion advice. These players then secretly assigned a variety of outlandish outfits - from a rabbit costume to a G-string bathing suit - to each of the other players. These players were brought in pairs to the clothing area and charged with changing into the designated costume and wearing it to a nearby train station, where all 13 players would meet to catch a train to St. Moritz. For each player who kept their costume on the entire time until reaching the Schweizerhof hotel, $2,000 was added to the pot. After the 5 couples were sent on their way, the three players who picked their outfits were given the choice to double the value of the challenge by wearing a baby bonnet, pacifier, and diaper to the station.

- Ali and Bribs acted as if they had been given exemptions by refusing to get on the train during the first challenge, but this turned out to be a prank. It did end up costing the team $2,000, as Darwin removed his rabbit ears when he believed the challenge would be a total loss.

High Roller Game: The players picked four players: one gambler, one with a cool head, one who's good with numbers, and one selfish brat. Each of the players was dressed in formal attire and escorted to a casino. There they played blackjack using $20,000 taken from the group pot. The team had one hour to play, with $1,000 minimum bets for each hand. If they doubled their $20,000 stake, the challenge was won. If the money was lost, it was deducted from the pot.

Blueberry Game: At dessert that night, each player was served a piece of cake. All but one piece was topped with a blueberry (one piece was left over after everyone had a piece; this piece was missing the blueberry). The player who ate that piece - along with her roommate - was given the chance to earn an exemption by each luring one other player into their hotel room, even though the producers had explicitly told them to stay in their rooms after dinner. The group was penalized $2,000 for the summoned players violating their curfew.

=== Episode 3 ===
Episode 3 recap – October 12, 2001 (re-aired June 4, 2002)Location: St. Moritz, Switzerland
Mission	Money earned	Possible earnings
Neutralizer	$10,000	$10,000
Little John & Little Jane	$25,000	$55,000
Current Pot	$91,000	$225,000

Neutralizer
Dorothy	Chosen because she had received an exemption the episode prior.

Exemptions
Al	As matchmaker, won final match in Little John & Little Jane game
Katie	Awarded spare exemption from Al

Execution
Lisa	3rd player executed (tied for last; slowest to complete quiz)

Journal Switch: At the start of the round, each of the players was required to pass their Mole journals four seats to their left around the dining room table.

Neutralizer: One player was recruited for being the most trustworthy of the group. That player was given a photograph of a nearby landmark and had 60 minutes to find the landmark and retrieve an envelope there. That person was Myra. The envelope contained a Neutralizer, which the player could use to prevent any other player from earning an exemption for the remainder of that round and add $10,000 to the group pot.

Little Jon & Little Jane: One player was selected to be a "matchmaker". That player's job was to pit each of the other players against one of two opponents in a pugil stick battle over a small stream. The available foes were Little John, a heavily built man; or Little Jane, an average-sized woman. At least three players were required to square off against Little John. Each player who won their bout and crossed the stream earned $5,000 for the group pot and the chance to compete for an exemption. Once everyone had completed their bout, the matchmaker pitted the players against each other until one remained. That player fought against the matchmaker for the exemption.

After the game was over, several of the players converged on Anderson and pushed him into the water. Bill, who had led the players in advancing on him, also fell in. Jokingly, Anderson said he would remember it. One of contestants retorted that it was payback for the Burn Bags Burn game.

Exemption to Spare: The winner of the exemption in the above challenge was later told that he had earned a second exemption, which he could award to any other player for any reason.

- After the airing of this episode on Friday October 12, 2001, ABC pulled Mole 2 off the air. It was put on hiatus and returned in May 2002.

=== Episode 4 ===
Episode 4 recap - June 4, 2002Location: St. Moritz, Switzerland, Venice, Italy, and Vicenza, Italy
Mission	Money earned	Possible earnings
Rappel Lock	$0	$35,000
Morality game	$30,000	$30,000
Dumb vs. Smart	$50,000	$50,000
1 penalty incurred	-$5,000	
Current Pot	$166,000	$340,000

Exemptions
Bill, Dorothy, and Rob	Won exemption in Dumb vs. Smart game

Execution
Patrick	4th player executed

Note: When Mole 2 returned in May 2002, ABC started the season over from the beginning. The first week (Tuesday May 28, 2002) of the second run featured a doubleheader of Episode 1 and Episode 2 reruns. On the second week (Tuesday June 4, 2002), there was a doubleheader of the Episode 3 rerun and previously unaired Episode 4. It marked the first new episode airing in almost eight months.

Rappel Lock: One person volunteered to be the most trusted, and four others volunteered as players who "just want to hang out". Each player took turns rappelling down a dam. Located at four points on the dam were signs that posed mathematical questions about the other players (ex.: "Darwin's Age - Heather's Age".) The answer to each problem served as a number in a combination lock that, when opened, released the prize money. Players had a maximum of 10 minutes on the dam and could not rappel a second time if they reached the bottom early. Once at the bottom, the player radioed to the trustworthy player their guesses on the questions they had seen. Unbeknownst to the other players, the last player was briefed about the four questions after the other players had already gone. The last player then had to rappel face-down towards the chest that guarded the money and had only one attempt to solve the combination.

Morality Game: While on their way to their next destination, the group was stopped by a pair of beautiful ladies asking for help with a flat tire. Later, an elderly lady also stopped the group with a flat of her own. If the group helped to fix both flats, they would win $30,000; if they helped only the beautiful ladies, $10,000 would be deducted from their running total.

Dumb vs. Smart: The six players who did not take part in the first challenge split into two groups of three "Dumb" and "Smart" players. The "Dumb" group was presented with a series of eleven brain-teaser questions, and needed to select five to present to the "Smart" group. The "Smart" group then had 30 minutes to solve the five problems for $10,000 apiece. If the team guessed a problem incorrectly, they were given one minute to come up with a second guess. If the "Smart" team could not solve all five problems, all three "Dumb" players earned an exemption; if the "Smart" players got all of them correct, they earned the exemptions.

- After switching the journals in the previous round, Patrick borrowed his original journal from Katie, ostensibly to copy some material into his new journal. It was later discovered that Patrick had ripped out several pages of the journal. For vandalizing a player's journal, the group was fined $5,000.

=== Episode 5 ===
Episode 5 recap - June 11, 2002Location: Vicenza, Italy
Mission	Money earned	Possible earnings
Think or Sink	$0	$20,000
Get the Key	$40,000	$40,000
Current Pot	$206,000	$400,000

Exemptions
none	Heather declined the exemption in the Dungeon Escape game

Execution
Rob	5th player executed

Think or Sink: Three players volunteered as the group's best runners, three as the best swimmers, and one as the biggest talker. The swimmers and the talker were taken to a swimming pool, where the swimmers had to tread water for as long as possible. At every five-minute interval, one swimmer had to carry a 500g weight. Meanwhile, the talker communicated by phone to the three runners, each of whom was responsible for finding the answer to a question located somewhere in the town they were in. Once those three questions were correctly answered, the talker used the letters marked in specially marked blanks on the answer key to form a fourth answer. If the fourth answer was correctly unscrambled before the three swimmers gave out, the challenge was won. This challenge gave viewers one of the most memorable moments of the season, as Katie (deemed the talker) neglected to transfer a lone "G" from the original three answers to the fourth one, resulting in a loss.

Get the Key: The three players who did not take part in the above challenge were taken to a dungeon, where each was locked in a separate cells. The key to open their cells was tied by a string around a light bulb in the center of the room, which served as the room's only source of light; breaking the light was necessary to release the key but would result in the room going pitch dark. The team had 3 hours for one of them to retrieve the key and release themselves from the cell. The player that did so was then offered an exemption by leaving the other two players in their cells overnight. No money was at risk, but leaving the players in their cells would prevent them from having a previously arranged video chat with a loved one that night.

=== Episode 6 ===
Episode 6 recap - June 18, 2002Location: Barga, Italy, and Lucca, Italy
Mission	Money earned	Possible earnings
Pizza Chefs	$20,000	$20,000
Wine Delivery	$20,000	$20,000
2 penalties incurred	-$10,000	
Exemption Confession	$0	$15,000
Current Pot	$236,000	$455,000

Exemptions
Elavia	Took exemption rather than adding $15,000 to the pot in the Exemption Confession game

Execution
Myra	6th player executed (tied for last; slowest to complete quiz)

Pizza Chefs: Three players volunteered as those who hate to cook; they were given the cooking challenge. They had four hours to find 14 pizza ingredients by going door to door in Barga, Tuscany and begging the townspeople, then must bake three 12" pizzas for the rest of the team and deliver them to the church, where they would be eating in four hours. Each ingredient had to be donated by a different person. These pizzas were to be the only food the players could eat that night. $20,000 was at stake, as well as food for dinner.

Wine Delivery: The three players who love to cook, as well as the three who didn't care, had 1 hour, 45 minutes to ride two bikes in varying states of repair along an entirely uphill road. Players were able to switch out bike-riding roles as desired, with the other two members of their group following in a van. At the midpoint, each team was given a bottle of wine to take to the church. $10,000 was awarded if both teams arrived, plus $5,000 for each unharmed bottle of wine.

Exemption Confession: Each player entered the Chiesa di San Salvatore the following day and was asked to write down a list of their fellow players, in order from favorite to least favorite. The player who garnered the most "least favorite" votes was asked to come inside the church. That player was then given the choice of adding $5,000 to the pot (to perhaps earn some redemption) or accepting an exemption (to annoy the other players further). If the player opted for the exemption, the offer was increased to $10,000 and finally $15,000.

- Two rules were broken: First, Heather touched one of the bikes before starting the Wine Delivery challenge, even after being expressly told they were unable to do so before they decided on which bike each team would ride. Second, Bill and Darwin partook in ice cream at a cafe after the pizza dinner, even though the pizzas were supposed to be the only food available to them that night. The team was fined $10,000 for these infractions and warned that further breaches of the rules would incur a $20,000 penalty. Myra, who was executed, was the first name Anderson entered into the computer. It was the first time in the American series that the first player entered into the computer came up with a red thumbprint.

=== Episode 7 ===
Episode 7 recap - June 25, 2002Location: Lucca, Italy
Mission	Money earned	Possible earnings
Gladiator Battle	$30,000	$30,000
Gnome Home	$0	$30,000
Current Pot	$266,000	$515,000

Exemptions
Bill	Broke the gnome during the Gnome Home game
—N/a	Bribs opted to not pursue the exemption in the Gladiator game

Bribe
Elavia	Accepted $50,000 to leave the game

Gladiator Battle: Five players volunteered as those who preferred to see the movie Gladiator. Four of them would serve as guards to the fifth, who served as Caesar. The players then engaged in a mock sword fight against five gladiators in the Lucca Amphitheater. Each fighter had an egg on their chest; if the egg broke, that person was dead. If the group slayed all five gladiators before any of them slayed Caesar and removed the crown, the team won. One player - who had randomly chosen a predesignated "Brutus helmet" - was given the chance to earn an exemption. If the other guards were slain, either by the gladiators or by Brutus, the player had to betray Caesar by slaying her and taking her crown.

Gnome Home: Three players volunteered as those who preferred to see the movie Romancing the Stone. They were given 30 minutes to transport a garden gnome through a series of obstacles. At each leg of the relay, they had to apply a generous amount of grease onto the gnome to make it slippery. Hidden inside the gnome was a plaque awarding an exemption to the player who broke it; however, players were not told this element of the game, only that an exemption was somehow involved.

- During dinner, Anderson asked the players to rank their fellow players in order from most to least favorite on a dollar bill. It was the second time the players ranked each other, and for the second time, Elavia was nominated as the least liked. During the execution, she was offered $50,000 ($49,992 in a suitcase, and the eight one-dollar bills with the rankings) to leave the game immediately. After consideration, she accepted the bribe and withdrew, thus eliminating the need for an execution. Anderson played with the contestants by tricking them into thinking that another player was going home, saying, "Let's continue with the execution. In a minute I'll begin entering your names into--Just kidding!" It was later revealed that Dorothy scored the lowest on that night's quiz and would have been executed if Elavia did not accept the bribe.

=== Episode 8 ===
Episode 8 recap - July 2, 2002Location: Lucca, Italy
Mission	Money earned	Possible earnings
Relative Disguise	$20,000	$35,000
Relative Bungee	$60,000	$70,000
Current Pot	$346,000	$620,000

Execution
Katie	7th player executed (tied for last; slowest to complete quiz)

Relative Disguise: Each player was informed that a loved one had been brought to their location and that each of them was in a nearby courtyard. Players had 30 seconds to describe that loved one to another player; that player then had 2 minutes to survey the courtyard through a window and identify the loved one. Each correctly spotted person won $5000 for the pot, as well as the opportunity for that loved one to join the team for dinner that night.

Relative Bungee: Each loved one made a video-recorded prediction as to whether their player would go through with a bungee jump. If the player's action matched the prediction, the group earned $10,000 and the two of them could remain together until that night's execution. If the prediction was incorrect, that player would have only five more minutes with his/her loved one until that person was sent off.

During dinner in the evening, Heather's boyfriend Nathan proposed to her. However, the two broke up at some time following production.

=== Episode 9 ===
Episode 9 recap – July 9, 2002Location: Lucca, Italy
Mission	Money earned	Possible earnings
Wine Stomp	$10,000	$10,000
Wine Wager	-$10,000	$10,000
Drink the wine	$10,000	$10,000
Assembly Line	$20,000	$20,000
All-Night Ball	$0	$30,000
Current Pot	$376,000	$700,000

Neutralizer
Dorothy	Bill placed the neutralizer thumbprint in Dorothy's journal.

Exemptions
—N/a	Bill appeared to receive an exemption in the All-Night Ball game However, it was negated when it was discovered that other players had touched the ball out of turn earlier.

Execution
Darwin	8th player executed

Neutralizer: The last person to leave the breakfast table that morning was secretly chosen for this game. That player had to place a thumbprint sticker inside the journal of another player at some point during the afternoon. Doing so neutralized that player, preventing him/her from earning any exemptions offered in that round. If the player failed to place the sticker, however, he or she would be neutralized instead.

Wine Stomp/Wine Wager: Two players volunteered as those who liked to drink wine. They had 90 minutes to make five bottles of wine the old-fashioned way: by stomping on the grapes and squeezing the juice into the bottle. Each player worked in 15-minute shifts. While one stomped, the other was given the chance to sample the vineyard's wares. Afterwards, the players had a chance to wager $5,000 each by pouring three glasses of wine and carrying them on a tray to a nearby table. (Naturally, both players were quite inebriated by this point and failed miserably.) They were then given a chance to redeem themselves by convincing the other players to drink one bottle of their "foot wine". However, they were not allowed to tell them that doing so would recover the money they had lost. During the game, Anderson partook in several glasses of wine, becoming somewhat inebriated himself, and offered considerable ridicule to the players and their wine smelling like feet.

Assembly Line: The other four players have two and a half hours to transport Anderson's car, an odd-looking 1950s Citroën, into a greenhouse. However, the greenhouse door was only partially opened; a combination lock prevented the door from being opened fully. Once the time was up, the car must be completely intact and able to start upon ignition. Tools were provided if the team decided to disassemble the vehicle and carry it inside by hand. Little to the players' knowledge, a clue had been given at breakfast, and another on the odometer, of the combination.

All-Night Ball: The six players were awakened in their hotel rooms shortly after midnight and taken to a room where a tetherball was suspended from the ceiling. The players must keep the ball in constant motion until 6:00 a.m., hitting the ball in the same order every time. At two points during the game, one player was allowed to return to bed. The third player to volunteer to go back to bed was offered an exemption by hitting the ball out of turn and forfeiting the game.

=== Episode 10 ===
Episode 10 recap - July 16, 2002Location: Rome, Italy, L'Aquila, Italy, and Santo Stefano di Sessanio, Italy
Mission	Money earned	Possible earnings
Buy and Sell	$0	$30,000
Morality Game	$10,000	$10,000
Evader	$100,000	$100,000
Current Pot	$486,000	$840,000

Exemptions
Al	During the Evader game, he succeeded as the Tracker
—N/a	Heather failed both times as the Evader

Execution
Bribs	9th player executed

Buy and Sell: Two players (Dorothy & Heather) volunteered as those who liked to shop and went to a flea market at the Piazza del Duomo in L'Aquila. Given one hour and ₤200,000 to spend (roughly $100), they were instructed to buy at least ten unique items, with the direction to drive as hard a bargain as they could. The three other players (Al, Bill, & Bribs) were then given two hours to sell the items the first two players bought and turn a profit.

Morality Game: In the midst of the selling portion of the above game, a townsperson stopped at the group's tent and dropped a book, with ₤20,000 sticking out. If the team returned the money (rather than using it in an attempt to aid their bottom line in the challenge), they earned $10,000.

Evader: The players took a vote as to which player other than themselves was most deserving of winning and which player was least likely to be the Mole. The deserving player (deemed the "Evader") was given a chance to earn an exemption by retrieving five out of nine thumbprints hidden along the streets of the small town of Santo Stefano di Sessanio within 30 minutes. The least suspicious player (deemed the "Tracker") was charged with finding that player and catching her, earning $50,000 for the group pot if successful. The other three players (deemed the "Spotters") could scout the evader and relay her movements to the Tracker, but the Tracker could not begin pursuit of the Evader until visual contact of the Evader was made. It was later discovered that the Tracker would also earn an exemption if he or she could catch the Evader. Two rounds of the game were played, both for either $50,000 or an exemption for the Evader. In the second round, the Tracker was switched and informed that if they caught the Evader, they would not also receive an exemption.

=== Episode 11 ===
Episode 11 recap - July 23, 2002Location: L'Aquila, Italy, and Calascio, Italy
Mission	Money earned	Possible earnings
High Card	$0	$100,000
Truth or Lie?	$50,000	$50,000
Current Pot	$536,000	$990,000

Exemptions
—N/a	Bill failed to spot the truth-teller in the liar game

Execution
Al	10th player executed

High Card: The players were taken to an unusual house in Calascio dubbed "Anderson's Funhouse". Each player started the game with a $25,000 "chip". Players were then dealt one playing card. Whoever had the highest card had the choice of either adding the $25,000 chip to the pot or eliminating another player from the game. The last remaining player was allowed to leave and spend the night in the hotel; the others had to stay in the funhouse and participate in one of three rooms. One room had a large python inside and would go dark after a certain period; another contained a small cage from which cockroaches would drop onto the player and would also go dark towards the end of the player's stay; and the third was a brightly lit room containing a bubble machine, a bed frame (but no mattress), and a speaker system that played Don Ho's "Tiny Bubbles" repeatedly and in varying manners (slow, backwards, sped up, stuttered, etc.) Each player had to remain in their rooms for a specific amount of time; leaving the room would forfeit the money earned in the card game.

Truth or Lie?: The player who had spent the night alone in the hotel (Bill) interrogated the three players (Al, Dorothy, and Heather) about their experiences in the funhouse. Two of the players were instructed to lie, and one was to tell the truth. The truth detector was shown a video clip of two of the three rooms but not who was in them and no other details. If the truth detector could correctly guess which player was telling the truth, he earned an exemption into the final round; otherwise, $50,000 was added to the pot.

=== Episode 12 ===
Episode 12 recap – July 30, 2002Location: Calascio, Italy
Mission	Money earned	Possible earnings
Three questions	$0	$30,000
Top secret	$100,000	$100,000
Final Pot	$636,000	$1,120,000

Three Questions: Each player filled out a questionnaire about the other two players. Each player took turns hiding inside a local residence in Calascio while the other two searched for him/her by predicting how the player answered three of the questions. If the duo answered all three questions right, the group earned $10,000.

Top Secret: Each player must race to a secret location. To get there, each player must locate a GPS, found in three locations, which the players chose off a dessert menu. The first player to find their GPS and reach the secret location was given the choice to see a dossier of sensitive information about the Mole or refuse to look at it and instead add $100,000 to the pot.

The remaining players took the final quiz at the Castle of Rocca Calascio, and the winner was to be revealed the following week.

=== Episode 13 ===
The final episode of the season crowned the winner and revealed the Mole. A new format was used to reveal the final results. On their last day of filming, the three finalists took the final quiz; however, none of the three were informed of the results. They all went home not yet knowing who won.

About three months later, all of the previously executed players were reunited to watch the unveiling. The three finalists (who still were unaware of the results) were each placed behind a locked door. A key was inserted through each door, but only one key would open a door, that which belonged to the winner. After Dorothy's door opened, she was revealed as the winner. She then slipped a second key to the door belonging to the Mole, and Bill emerged. Heather settled for the runner-up position.

As was tradition, the remainder of the episode was spent detailing the ways the Mole had sabotaged the team, as well as explaining the clues littered throughout the episodes that home viewers were to use in order to figure out the Mole's identity.

Heather had first suspected Elavia as the Mole and formed a coalition with Katie. After Elavia took the $50,000 bribe to leave the game, Heather and Katie moved on to their next suspect, Dorothy. They tied for the lowest score on the next quiz; Katie finished 11 seconds slower than Heather and was executed. Shocked, Heather realized Dorothy could not be the mole and moved on to her third suspect, Bill. She tried forming a coalition with Dorothy during the "Buy and Sell" game. Heather did not know that she was one of Dorothy's top suspects. After convincing Dorothy that she would not backstab her, they targeted Bribs. Heather lied to Bribs about being the mole. She confused Bribs enough to split his vote on the quiz, thus executing him. Afterwards, they targeted Al, who was beginning to suspect Bill as the mole. Dorothy pretended to hesitate adding $25,000 to the pot during the "Anderson's Fun House" card game, enraging Al. Al then split his quiz between Bill and Dorothy (but claimed he suspected Dorothy during that round) and scored the lowest on the quiz. After Al was executed, Heather regretted forming a coalition with Dorothy because she now knew she was up against a well-prepared opponent. She broke down during the "Evader" and "Top Secret" games. Dorothy and Heather both took the final quiz and correctly identified Bill as the Mole. Dorothy bested Heather by one question.

== Mole sabotage ==
Born Leaders: Knowing that he would be chosen as one of the leaders given his age and his background as a former Admiral, Bill assigned players to the next three games who were most unsuited for those challenges. He drafted Bob and Rob, who both admitted to not being very athletic, to the demanding Crossbow Biathlon. In addition, he assigned Al, who had been suffering from an upset stomach all day, to take part in the Pulse Rope Walk. Although Bill's choices all had relatively subpar performances, none of them did badly enough to prevent the team from winning the money.

Clothesline: When Ali and Bribs went missing, Bill was sent out to find them; he quickly located them in a nearby pub. Rather than immediately bringing them back to the train station, he joined them for a drink at the bar and then planted the idea to play the situation off as if Ali and Bribs were offered an exemption to throw the challenge. They kept up the ruse for a few minutes, long enough to convince the group they were refusing to board the train. Ali and Bribs fessed up to the joke but not before Darwin removed his rabbit ears from his costume in disgust. This resulted in the team losing the $2,000 bounty associated with leaving Darwin's costume on for the duration of the game. In addition, Bill refused to put on the diaper and bib that would have doubled the value of the challenge, even though Dorothy and Elavia were up to the idea.

Journal Switch: Most players exhaustively recorded the mundane details of every game and encounter they had with the other players in their respective journals. Bill, however, took minimal notes, as it was technically unnecessary for him to do so. When he was informed by the producers that the players would trade journals the next day, he scurried to fill his journal with content. He wrote a heart-felt, emotional, mostly fictional love letter to his wife about his experience in the game. He wrote that he lacked confidence in winning and expected to be executed soon. Bill's journal went to Lisa. She read the letter, was convinced of its sincerity, and eliminated Bill as a suspect to be the Mole. Not surprisingly, Lisa was the next player executed. Though no money was removed from the pot, Bill succeeded in turning aside a player's attention, which directly and swiftly led to her execution.

Think or Sink: Despite boasting about being fairly talented at swimming, Bill went out less than ten minutes into the challenge. He chalked it up to the fact that he was not indeed swimming but rather treading water. Darwin and Bribs were left to pick up his slack and failed the challenge while Katie searched fruitlessly for one missing letter she had failed to transfer to the final puzzle. Bill received some suspicion, but his actions were considered "too obvious" by some players, who thought he was simply pretending to be the mole.

Pizza Chefs: Initially, it appeared Bill would have little problem sabotaging the game, because after an hour, the team had almost nothing to show for their efforts. However, they unexpectedly met up with a boy in the town who helped them complete the task with ease. Since he was not able to foil the game itself, after dinner, Bill noticed a nearby trattoria selling ice cream. He bought some (eating it quickly), complaining he was still hungry after the less-than-satisfying homemade pizza (knowing also the players neglected to wash their hands when making the pizzas). Darwin, spotting Bill with the frozen treat, was interested too. Bill gave him some money, and he bought some ice cream. This was a violation of the rules regarding the pizza challenge, since players were informed that the pizza they ate for dinner was to be the only food available to them that evening. While Bill scarfed down his ice cream almost unnoticed by everyone, Darwin saved his and ate it in front of the other players. The other players saw him with food but ultimately dismissed it as an honest mistake. Later that evening, the players were informed that a $10,000 penalty would be assessed to the pot due to the food violations. Players were suspicious but put more emphasis on Heather's mistake in the Wine Delivery game that same day. Bill succeeded in sabotaging a game with minimal suspicion.

Gnome Home: Bill figured (as did Heather before him) that the way to earn the exemption was to break the gnome, so he volunteered himself to work the middle leg of the relay, which involved a challenging bicycle obstacle course. After wasting precious time forgetting to take a picture with the soccer goalie he had just scored against, he hurried through the bike course, dropping the gnome and breaking it. Furthermore, Bill tried to redirect some suspicion, as he pointed out the basket on the front of the bicycle was not even attached, and Heather had insisted he place the gnome in the basket.

Assembly Line: Bill was aware of the fact that the combination lock would need to be opened in order to move the car into the greenhouse, so he tried to keep everyone's attention focused on dismantling the car in an attempt to fit it through the narrow opening left by the door. He wasted considerable time by having the team dismantle unnecessary parts (such as the seats), even though they would not have made the car smaller. He even tried to coax the team into removing the engine, which would have undoubtedly doomed the test. Unfortunately for Bill, Darwin noticed the lock, and Dorothy figured out the combination on her own. The last few minutes of the challenge were spent scrambling to put the car back together before pushing it into the greenhouse, an effort that Bill was unable to stall. At the same time, he had been selected to play the secret Neutralizer game, and targeting Dorothy was his obvious choice. The only positive for Bill was that, again, Dorothy mysteriously figured out a difficult clue in the last minute, which led many players to suspect she had foreknowledge of the answers (and thus thought she was the mole).

All-Night Ball: With the foreknowledge that the third player to admit to being "the most tired" would have a chance at an exemption, he began lying down and almost missing the ball several times as soon as Heather, the second person to be excused from the game, left. When offered the exemption, Bill immediately ended the game by hitting the ball out-of-turn. However, it was later discovered that Darwin had much earlier in the night persuaded Dorothy to hit the ball out of turn, and Bribs had hit the ball back-to-back as well, which eased some of the suspicion from Bill.

Buy & Sell: Although Bill admitted afterwards that it would have been nearly impossible to turn a profit with the bizarre assortment of wares they were forced to sell, he did little to help matters, spending more energy making a spectacle of himself than being a salesman.

Three Questions: When Bill's turn to answer the questionnaire came up, he made it a point to answer the questions using the most illogical reasoning possible. For example, one question asked whether Dorothy or Heather would be more likely to be alone ten years from now. While the two girls went with Dorothy because Heather and her boyfriend had recently become engaged, Bill said that he had chosen Heather since nearly half of all marriages now end in divorce. (Coincidentally, Heather did break up with her boyfriend.) In addition, the producers secretly slipped Bill the answers Heather and Dorothy wrote. When it was his turn to search for them, he used that knowledge to make sure they got at least one answer wrong, because a single incorrect guess foiled the round. None of the three rounds of questions ended successfully, but in Bill's case Dorothy and Heather missed on all three of his questions.

Top Secret: Although told previously to get to Anderson first and choose the dossier over the $100,000, Bill became physically and mentally exhausted during the game. He decided to take the money after "maxing out that much" and because he knew Dorothy and Heather have been suspecting him for the past few episodes.

== Hidden clues ==
At the start of each episode, host Anderson Cooper encouraged viewers to keep an eye out for a hidden clue to the Mole's identity. One clue was revealed in each episode, ranging from straightforward references to Bill's background to highly esoteric wordplays. Some clues were presented to the players, while others were available only to the home audience.

Episode 1:

- Burn Bags Burn: All outdoor shots of the night sky were absent of stars, except for one digitally-enhanced shot. This shot, taken outside the cabin where the players stayed shortly before the next game, featured the constellation Pisces, Bill's Zodiac sign. Viewers could have used Bill's biographical information on the ABC website to deduce this.

Episode 2:

- Pre-Execution: In the opening montage, two pictures of Zodiac signs are shown. The first is Virgo, Ali's Zodiac sign, and she was the Mole's second victim. The second sign is Pisces, a reference to episode one's clue.

Episode 3:

- Journal Switch: A journal written ostensibly by the Mole was planted for the other players to discover and read it. In it, the Mole explains how eliminating his first victim, Bob, was "too easy", as he had spent all of his time "schmoozing the ladies". This should have ruled out any female from further suspicion.

Episode 4:

- The Telegram: Upon arriving in Italy, the players are welcomed with a telegram sent by "La Talpa", which is Italian for "The Mole". Patrick thought there was a clue to this (although he couldn't figure it out), and he was correct. There was a fake telephone number given at the bottom, 0024–5500. When using a telephone keypad as a decoder, the line reads "BILL". When decoding the numbers preceding the name, 843–665347, the sentence reads "THE MOLE IS BILL".

Episode 5:

- Think or Sink: Anderson talks about how many believe that William Shakespeare was a "scoundrel" for plagiarizing the story of Romeo and Juliet from a local playwright. (The Italian translation of the play's title, "Giulietta è Romeo", served as the solution to the game.) This was to point out that the Mole was a scoundrel, and Bill's real name is William.

Episode 6:

- Wine Delivery: At the midway point of the course, Anderson would hand the rider a bottle of La Mole wine, while eating an apple (first to Al, and then Elavia). The apple was a symbol of Bill's home state, Washington.

Episode 7:

- Player Ranking: Prior to execution the players were each (again) instructed to rank their fellow players in order from favorite to least favorite on a dollar bill. This was intended as a reference to the name of the Mole, Bill.

Episode 8:

- The Quiz: No pictures were featured in the other quizzes except for this one. In the back, there was a portrait of a large schooner prominently shown on the wall, referring to Bill's background as a Navy admiral.

Episode 9:

- Opening: During the Matrix-like grid of letters that flashed on the screen during the opening title sequence, the word "AdMiRaL" is displayed in the top-left corner for a split-second. The clue is a reference to the clue in episode 8.

Episode 10:

- Morality Game: A local man visits the team's table and leaves behind a book and money. The book was Romeo and Juliet, a reference to the clue made in Episode 5. Both Al and Bribs noticed the coincidence, but neither made the correct connection from it.
- Post-Execution: After Bribs is executed and leaves, Anderson asks all the players if they are the mole, and they all deny it. Then, the viewer sees each person, one by one, along with a word of the question "Who is the Mole?". Bill is shown when the word Mole appears.

Episode 11:

- Anderson's Fun House: A montage of three model ships were shown as lightning flashed, referring to episodes 8 and 9's clues.
- Pre-Quiz Dinner: The players are treated to a dinner consisting of fast food from McDonald's. Anderson mentions the dinner is a "courtesy of 'Mickey D's'". Mickey D's is a nickname for the fast food franchise, but it also serves as a clue to Bill's last name, McDaniel.

Episode 12:

- Opening: Much like the clue in Episode 9, a message is concealed among the letter grid in the opening title. This time, however, the message is far more blatant, as "Bill is the Mole" is spelled out along the top of the screen.
