= Tiny Bubbles (album) =

1966 studio album by Don Ho

Studio album by Don Ho
- Released: November 11, 1966
- Recorded: 1966
- Genre: Pop standards Hawaiian Music
- Length: 32:47
- Label: Reprise
- Producer: Sonny Burke

Don Ho chronology
The Don Ho Show (1965)	Tiny Bubbles (1966)	Don Ho - Again! (1966)

Tiny Bubbles is an album by Hawaiian singer Don Ho. Released on November 11, 1966, the album peaked at #15 on the Billboard 200 chart due to the success of the single, the title track.

== Track listing ==
Tiny Bubbles includes the following tracks.

Side one
No.	Title	Writer(s)	Length
1.	"Please Wait For Me"	Ben Raleigh, Howlett Smith	2:48
2.	"One Paddle, Two Paddle"	Kui Lee	1:48
3.	"Beautiful Kauai"	Kui Lee	2:49
4.	"Young Land"	Lani Kai	2:22
5.	"Happy Me"	Irmgard Aluli, Leon Pober, Mary Kawena Pukui	2:36
6.	"Hawaii"	Elmer Bernstein, Mack David	2:45

Side two
No.	Title	Writer(s)	Length
7.	"You'll Never Go Home"	Leon Pober	1:47
8.	"She's Gone Again (I'll Remember You)"	Kui Lee	3:30
9.	"Geev'um"	Eaton Magoon, Jr.	2:27
10.	"The Lights Of Home"	Leon Pober, Steve Graham	3:03
11.	"Tiny Bubbles"	Leon Pober	2:45
12.	"I Love The Simple Folks"	Howlett Smith	4:07

== Charts ==
Chart (1967)	Peak position
US Billboard 200	15
