= The Don Ho Show =

- Genre: Variety show
- Directed by: Jeff Margolis; Jack Regas
- Presented by: Don Ho
- Starring: Don Ho; Sam Kapu Jr.
- Country of origin: United States
- Original language: English
- No. of seasons: 1
- No. of episodes: 90

Production
- Executive producer: Bob Banner
- Producer: Brad Lachman
- Running time: 30 minutes
- Production company: Bob Banner Associates

Original release
- Network: ABC
- Release: 25 October 1976 – 4 March 1977

The Don Ho Show is an American daytime variety program hosted by entertainer Don Ho that aired on ABC between 1976 and 1977.

The variety show, which ran for 90 episodes in a five-month run, featured guest appearances from celebrities, including Lucille Ball, Tony Bennett, and Redd Foxx, as well as singing, comedy, and audience participation.
