= William J. McDaniel =

Rear admiral of the United States Navy

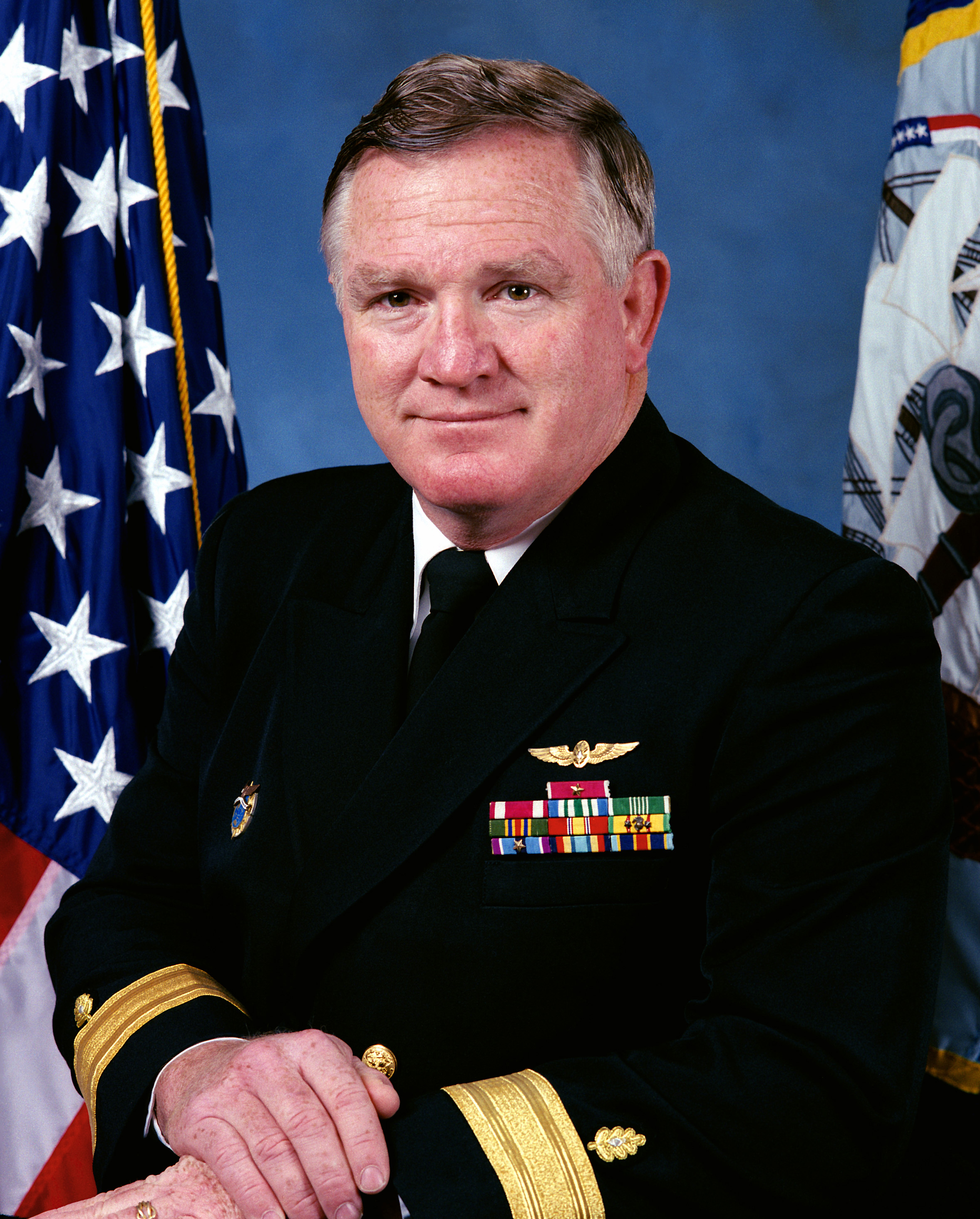
- Born: February 26, 1943 (age 83) near Muskogee, Oklahoma
- Military career
- Allegiance: United States of America
- Branch: United States Navy
- Service years: 1969-1997
- Rank: Rear Admiral
- Nickname: Bill
- Awards: Defense Superior Service Medal; Legion of Merit (2 awards); Meritorious Service Medal; Joint Service Commendation Medal; Army Commendation Medal; Meritorious Unit Commendation; National Defense Service Medal (two awards); Humanitarian Service Medal

William J. McDaniel (born 26 February 1943) is a retired rear admiral of the United States Navy. He served in the Medical Corps and was commander of the Naval Medical Center Portsmouth in Portsmouth, Virginia.

== Background and education ==
McDaniel was born on a farm near Muskogee, Oklahoma, on February 26, 1943. He grew up in Oklahoma and graduated from Blackwell High School in Blackwell, Oklahoma. He attended college at Oklahoma State University, where he was a member of the varsity wrestling team. He graduated from OSU in 1964 with a Bachelor of Science in physiology. He then entered the University of Oklahoma College of Medicine, and he graduated with a Doctor of Medicine degree in 1968. He completed his residency in Tulsa, Oklahoma, at St. Francis Hospital.

== Navy career ==
McDaniel received his commission into the United States Army Medical Corps in 1969. He was trained as a flight surgeon at the Naval Aerospace Medical Institute in Pensacola, Florida. He served as a flight surgeon at Marine Corps Air Stations in El Toro, California, Futema, Okinawa, and Whidbey Island, Washington. He also served aboard the USS Tripoli off the coast of Vietnam.

McDaniel began his Orthopedic Surgery Residency in 1973 at the Naval Hospital in Oakland, California. He later served as Chief of the Department of Orthopedics and then Acting Commanding Officer and Director of Clinical Services at the Naval Hospital in Rota, Spain. He then was Orthopedic Surgeon at the Naval Regional Medical Clinic, Department of Orthopedics, U.S. Naval Academy. He served aboard the USS Blue Ridge in Yokosuka, Japan as the Seventh Fleet Surgeon and then as the Commanding Officer of the Naval Hospital in Oak Harbor, Washington. In 1988, he became Commanding Officer of the Naval Hospital in Charleston, South Carolina.

In 1989, he was promoted to rear admiral. He became the U.S. Pacific Command Surgeon at Camp H.M. Smith, Hawaii, in June 1990. From 1992 to 1995, he was the Commander of the Naval Medical Center Portsmouth in Portsmouth, Virginia. He retired from the Navy in 1997.

== Athletics ==
During his Navy career, McDaniel was Navy Wrestling Champion from 1973 through 1977, Interservice Wrestling Champion in 1975 to 1976 and World Silver Medalist in the 1974 CISM Military World Games in Rome, Italy. McDaniel was U.S. Team Physician for the U.S. 1984 Olympic Team, and he continued to be involved in Olympics medical care through 2000. Throughout his navy career, McDaniel continued to wrestle, and wrestling matches between him and fellow staff members were occasionally organized at the medical centers he commanded.

== Retirement ==
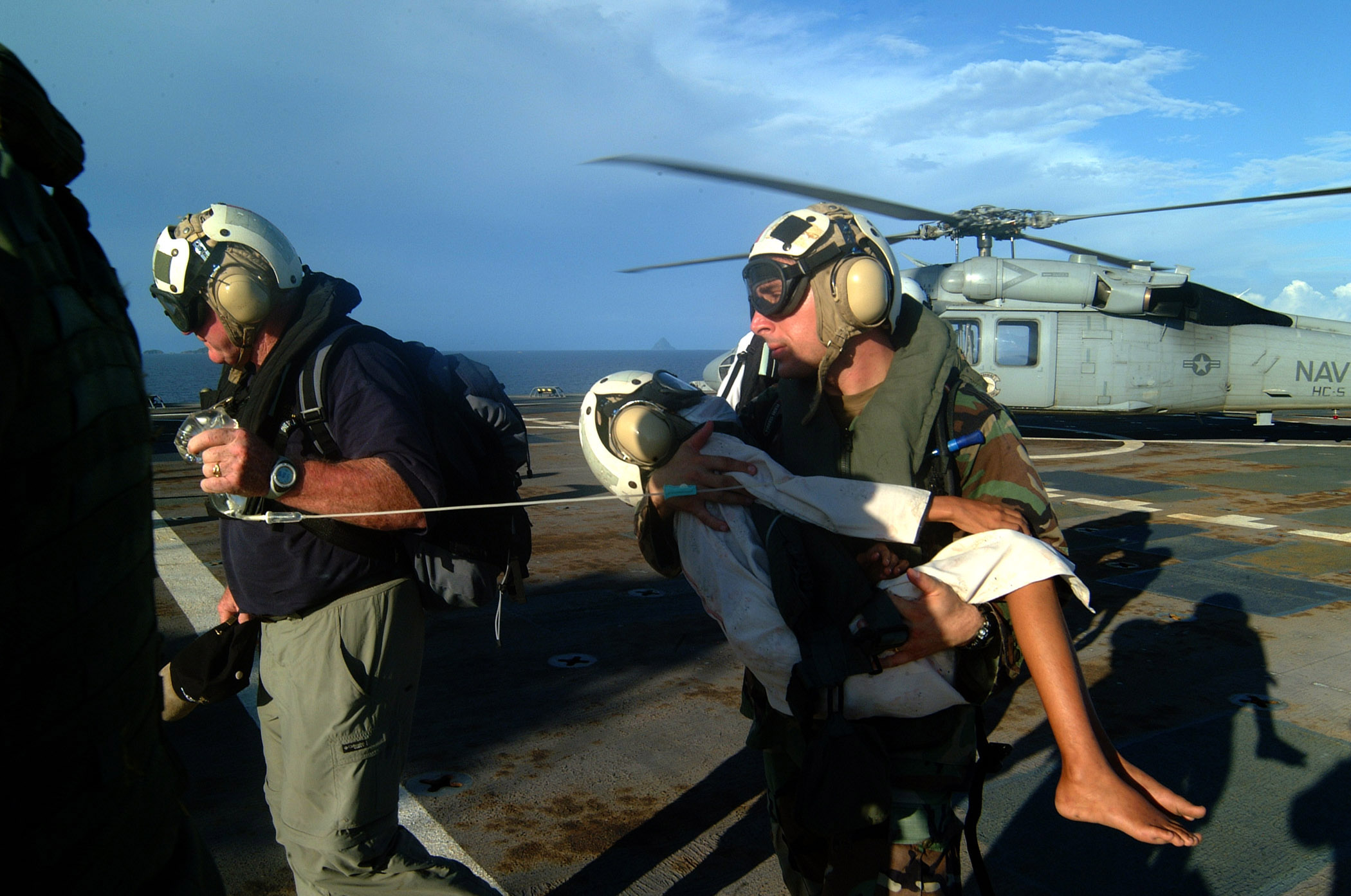
McDaniel (left) assisting in relief efforts in Indonesia

In 2001, McDaniel served as Johns Hopkins University's liaison to the federal government after the September 11th attacks. McDaniel was a contestant on Season 2 of the American reality TV Series, The Mole, which aired in the U.S. from 2001 to 2002. In 2005, McDaniel led Naval Hospital Ship USNS Mercy in its tsunami relief efforts in Indonesia, where he worked in Banda Aceh and Nias Island. He also was part of Hurricane Katrina relief efforts. He currently serves on the Patriot Support Advisory Board of the Behavioral Health Division of Universal Health Services.

== Personal life ==
McDaniel is married to the former Shirley Blair of Tulsa, Oklahoma.

McDaniel appeared as the mole on Season 2 of ABC's The Mole and wrote a book about his experiences.

In the 2024 United States presidential election, McDaniel endorsed Kamala Harris.

== Awards ==
McDaniel's military awards include:

- Defense Superior Service Medal
- Legion of Merit (two awards)
- Meritorious Service Medal
- Joint Service Commendation Medal
- Army Commendation Medal
- Meritorious Unit Commendation
- National Defense Service Medal (two awards)
- Humanitarian Service Medal

In addition to his military awards, McDaniel has also been inducted into the Oklahoma State University Hall of Fame, and he served as OSU's 2005 Homecoming Grand Marshall.
