= Jon Kelley =

American football player (born 1965)

Jon Kelley (born August 5, 1965) is an American sports journalist, author, producer, and television personality, who currently hosts the revival of the late 1960s game show Funny You Should Ask. Born and raised in Lincoln, Nebraska, Kelley played four seasons of college football as a running back for the Nebraska Cornhuskers before graduating from the University of Nebraska–Lincoln with a Bachelor of Arts degree in broadcast journalism. He signed as a free agent with the Denver Broncos of the National Football League (NFL) in 1988 before embarking on a broadcasting career.

He served as the host of the fifth season of ABC's reality television show The Mole.

== Television work ==
=== Chicago sports anchor ===
During his eight years in Chicago, Kelley was widely regarded as one of the region's top sports anchors and directors, covering the World Championship Chicago Bulls in all six of the team's title seasons. In addition to his nightly sportscasts, Kelley hosted the number one rated "Sports Sunday," WMAQ-TV's half-hour, expanded sports highlights program. There he shared the anchor desk with some of the city's most dynamic sports and entertainment personalities, including NBA star Dennis Rodman and "Tonight Show" host Jay Leno among others. Kelley joined WMAQ-TV as a sports reporter and weekend anchor in April 1991.

=== WMAQ-TV ===
While at WMAQ-TV, Kelley was part of a sports team that earned such prestigious awards as the Chicago/Midwest Emmy award for producing and anchoring his hour-long special highlighting the Chicago Bulls' quest for a fifth championship. Kelley also received the Peter Lisagor Award for Sports Journalism and an Illinois Broadcasters Association Silver Dome Award for Best Sportscast.

=== Early broadcast career ===
During his early years in broadcasting, Kelley did stints as a sports reporter and weekend sports anchor at WDAF-TV, Channel 4, the Fox affiliate in Kansas City, Missouri, and worked as a news reporter at KMTV-TV in Omaha, Nebraska. He began his career as a weekend sports anchor and reporter at KTIV-TV in Sioux City, Iowa.

=== Fox Sports Network ===
Kelley served as the main anchor for the Fox Sports Network's "The National Sports Report," and the lead anchor for the weekly series "Baseball Today."

=== Extra ===
Kelley co-hosted "Extra's" one-hour weekend edition and was the show's primary correspondent from 2001 through 2007.

=== ABC and The Mole ===
Kelley co-hosted ABC's "Holiday with the Stars" and ABC's "All-Star Tribute to Movies" on Oscar Sunday. His diverse broadcast career has spanned over 15 years in news, sports, and entertainment. He hosted the summer 2008 revival of the reality TV series The Mole, the show previously hosted by Anderson Cooper and Ahmad Rashad.

=== KNTV-TV ===
On July 8, 2011, it was announced that Kelley would join the NBC affiliate in San Francisco as co-anchor of the morning show.

=== WFLD ===
In November 2013, Kelley left San Francisco and returned to Chicago to join the FOX owned and operated station in Chicago to co-anchor Good Day Chicago.

=== Entertainment Studios ===
In June 2016, Kelley teamed up with media mogul Byron Allen, joining Allen's Entertainment Studios. Kelley assumes hosting and producing duties on several of Allen's television properties, including along with Funny You Should Ask, the celebrity interview series Entertainers and the sports profile series The American Athlete. Additionally, Kelley takes on a role with Entertainment Studios Motion Pictures, working with Freestyle Releasing, acquired by Allen in 2015. Kelley also produces content for Entertainment Studios’ video news platform, TheGrio.com.

== Writings ==
Kelley is the co-author of the book "Breaking Into Broadcasting," a guide to landing one's first (or next) on-air job in television.

== Shows ==
Kelley hosts the TV show "Funny You Should Ask," A comedy show airing on CBS.
