= Don Ho =

American singer and musician (1930–2007)

- Born: Donald Tai Loy Ho; August 13, 1930; Honolulu, Territory of Hawaii
- Died: April 14, 2007 (aged 76); Honolulu, Hawaii, U.S.
- Spouses: Melva May Kolokea Wong (m. 1951; died 1999); Haumea Hebenstreit (m. 2006–2007)
- Partners: Elizabeth Guevara; Patricia Swallie
- Children: 10, including Hoku
- Musical career
- Genres: Traditional pop Hawaiian Music
- Occupations: Singer, musician
- Instrument: Vocals
- Years active: 1959–2007
- Label: Reprise Records

Donald Tai Loy Ho (August 13, 1930 – April 14, 2007) was an American traditional pop musician, singer, and entertainer. He is best known for the song "Tiny Bubbles" from the 1966 album of the same name.

== Early life, family and education ==
Ho was a singer of Native Hawaiian, Chinese, Portuguese, Dutch, and German descent. He was born in the small Honolulu neighborhood of Kakaʻako to Emily (Honey) Leimaile Silva and James Ah You Puao Ho, but he grew up in Kāneʻohe on the windward side of the island of Oʻahu.

He was a graduate of the Kamehameha Schools in 1949 and he attended Springfield College on a football scholarship in 1950, but he returned home to earn a Bachelor's degree in sociology at University of Hawaiʻi in 1953.

== Career ==
In 1954, Ho entered the U.S. Air Force, doing his primary training at Columbus Air Force Base, Mississippi and spent time flying C-97s with the Military Air Transport Service. Transferred to Travis Air Force Base, California, he went to the local city of Concord and bought an electronic keyboard from a music store, and recalls, "That's when it all started."

While in the military, Ho traveled from state to state with his young family until he was called home to help his mother with the family bar business, Honey's. Ho left the Air Force in 1959 due to his mother's developing illness and began singing at her club in Kaneohe. Honey's became a hotspot for the local entertainment and the growing customers from the Kaneohe Marine Base servicemen. Ho always honored the military remembering his own years of military service. In 1963, he moved the Kāneʻohe Honey's to Waikīkī. After much success, and little room to grow, promoter Kimo Wilder McVay sought Don to play at a night club called Duke's owned by Duke Kahanamoku, where he caught the attention of record company officials.

Ho was originally signed to Reprise Records. He released his debut album, The Don Ho Show!, in 1965 and began to play high-profile locations in Las Vegas, Lake Tahoe and New York City. In 1966 he released his second album, a live compilation called Don Ho – Again!, which charted in the early part of that year. In the fall of 1966, Ho released his most famous song, "Tiny Bubbles", which charted on both the pop (#57 Billboard) and easy listening charts and caused his subsequent album, also called Tiny Bubbles, to remain in the album Top 200 for almost a year. Another song associated with Don was "Pearly Shells". From 1964 to 1969, Don's backing group was The Aliis: Al Akana, Rudy Aquino, Benny Chong, Manny Lagodlagod and Joe Mundo.

In his stage show, Ho would make jokes about being sent in the mid-1950s to Keesler Air Force Base, Mississippi and being Hawaiian. Don Ho enjoyed asking for a show of hands of veterans of World War II. He would ask for all the Pearl Harbor survivors to stand. He would tell the men from the European theater, "you got your glory in the movies" that they could watch. The veterans of the Pacific theater were invited on stage to join the hula dancers.

Ho's music used typical 1960s pop arrangements, which meant light instrumentation and Hammond organs. He was well-positioned to capitalize on the newly admitted state's growing popularity as a tourist destination during the decade due to cheap air travel and the popularity of Tiki bars. His shows would be attended by celebrities in addition to ordinary tourists.

During the second half of the decade, a growing movement emerged in Hawaii to produce more traditional forms of music that subtly accused Ho of being too commercialized and marketed to tourists. His popularity never seriously suffered however, and his shows remained popular with vacationers.

Guest appearances on television series such as I Dream of Jeannie, The Brady Bunch, Sanford and Son, Batman, Charlie's Angels, McCloud and Fantasy Island soon followed. Although his album sales peaked in the late 1960s, he was able to land a television series on ABC from October 1976 to March 1977 with The Don Ho Show variety program which aired on weekday mornings.

His daughter Hoku performed with him in his Waikīkī show and in 2000 went on to become a nationally known recording artist in her own right. In 2005, he sang a song that was used as the opening theme to the direct-to-video movie Aloha, Scooby-Doo!.

== Work with other artists ==
A protege of Don Ho was Robin Wilson. Another was Taimane Gardner, known as Taimane.

== Personal life ==
=== Family ===
Ho married twice and had ten children with three women. He first married his high school sweetheart, Melva May Kolokea Wong, on November 22, 1951; they had six children together. They were married for 48 years, until Melva's death on June 8, 1999.

After Melva's death, Ho had four more children from two subsequent relationships; he lived at his Diamond Head residence with his children and their mothers. His children often worked with him, either onstage, backstage, or with his business. He loved to work with his children, teaching them the entertainment business.

In September 2006, Ho married Haumea Hebenstreit, who was a production assistant for his show at the Waikīkī Beachcomber.

=== Illness and death ===
In 1995, at age 65, Ho suffered a mild stroke, after which his health began a steady decline. By 2002, he had developed cardiomegaly, an enlarged heart, unrelated to coronary artery disease, leaving him with only 30% of normal cardiac capacity. Despite his failing health, Ho was always hopeful and resilient to find a solution to his health issues. He also continued his nightly performances making a few concessions, such as trading in his glass of Scotch, which he kept on top of his piano at shows, for pineapple juice.

Ho was diagnosed with cardiomyopathy in 2005 and had a pacemaker implanted. Ho still experienced a number of problems afterwards, including an episode when his pacemaker malfunctioned during a concert. On another occasion, he was making repairs to the roof of his house when his heart suddenly started racing. He contacted a biotechnology company specializing in treating heart conditions with adult stem cells working in conjunction with Dr. Shoa, cardiac surgeon and pioneer of the use of adult stem cells for heart disease. On December 6, 2005, Ho had his own blood-derived stem cells injected into his heart by Amit Patel and his fellow surgeons in Thailand. The treatment went without incident and it was reported that his heart would be boosted back to 75% capacity. Later in the month, Ho said, "I'm feeling much better and I'm so happy I came up here to do it." In regard to his health problems, he remarked "I'd been going around for years acting like I was 40. And then when all this happened, someone told me 'You're 75.' Everyone gets old. Why did I think I was exempt?"

Ho had a new pacemaker installed on September 16, 2006. On April 14, 2007, he died in his Waikīkī apartment from heart failure. He was cremated and his ashes were scattered at sea.

Since Ho's death, his estate has been in limbo because of numerous management conflicts and legal changes that transpired while he was struggling with his mental and physical health.
