= Timmy McClain =

American football player

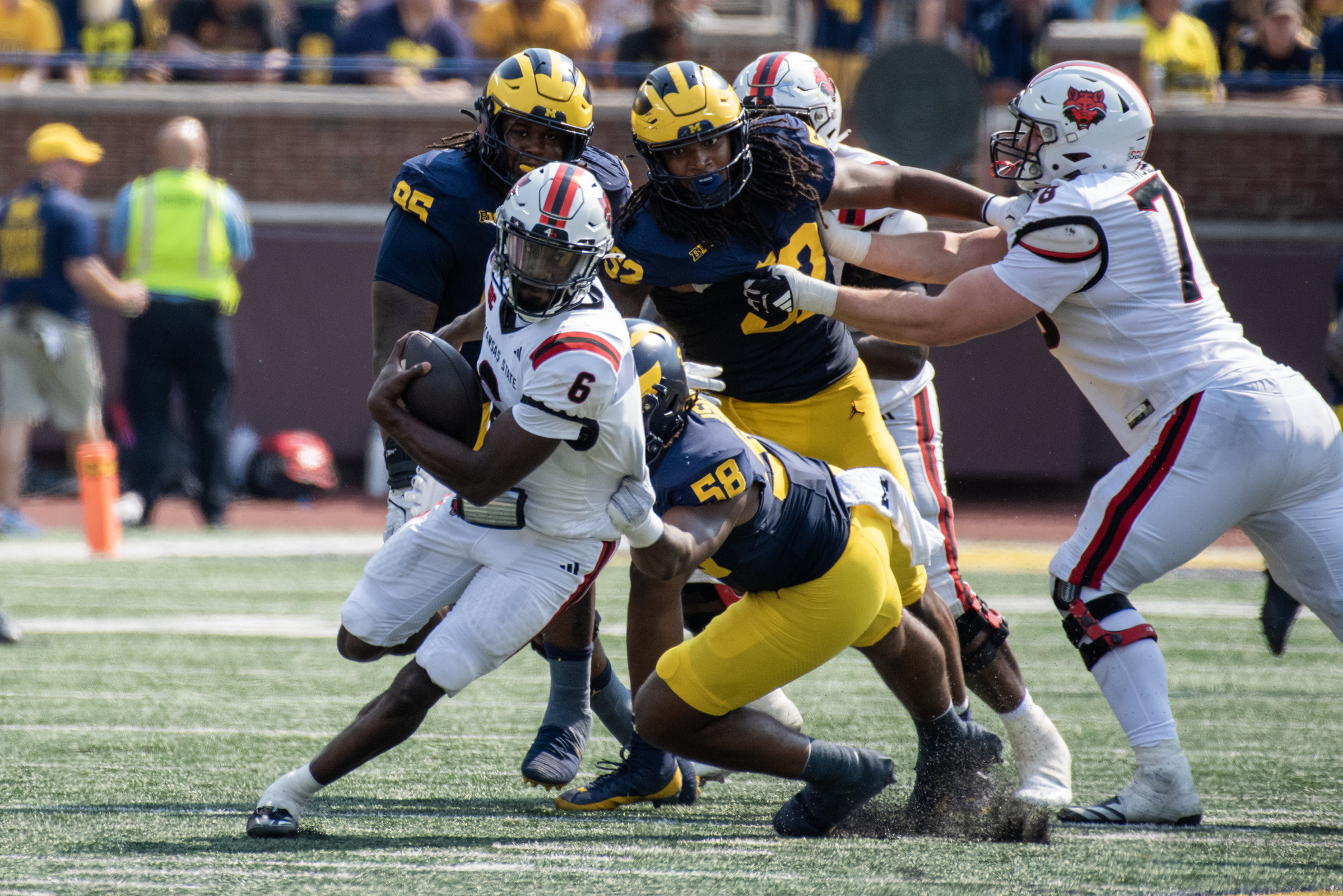
- McClain with the Arkansas State Red Wolves in 2024

No. 7 – Louisiana Rouxgaroux
- Position: Quarterback

Personal information
- Listed height: 6 ft 1 in (1.85 m)
- Listed weight: 192 lb (87 kg)

Career information
- High school: Seminole (Sanford, Florida)
- College: South Florida (2021); UCF (2022–2023); Arkansas State (2024); Bethune–Cookman (2025)

Career history
- Monroe Greenheads (2026); Louisiana Rouxgaroux (2026–present)

Awards and highlights
- The Arena League Offensive MVP (2026); Florida Classic MVP (2025)
- Stats at ESPN

Timmy Jahqueal McClain is an American professional football quarterback for the Louisiana Rouxgaroux of National Arena League. He previously played college football for the South Florida Bulls, the UCF Knights, the Arkansas State Red Wolves, and the Bethune–Cookman Wildcats.

== Early life ==
McClain attended Seminole High School. He led his team to 40 wins where he passed for 6,351 yards and ran for 940 yards, while also adding 85 total touchdowns. McClain was a three-star (top 100 ranked quarterback) in the class of 2021, with notable offers from Boston College, UCF, Kentucky, Louisville, and West Virginia, but he chose to play college football at University of South Florida.

== College career ==
=== South Florida ===
In his first career start in week 3 of the 2021 season, McClain completed 12 of 23 passes for 163 yards and a touchdown in a win over Florida A&M. After week 3 he took over as the team's starting quarterback. McClain finished the 2021 season with nine starts, where he completed 55.8% of his pass attempts for 1,888 yards and five touchdowns with seven interception, while also adding 238 yards and four touchdowns on the ground. After losing the starting quarterback spot to Gerry Bohanon for the 2022 season, he entered the NCAA transfer portal.

=== UCF ===
McClain transferred to the University of Central Florida in August of 2022. In his first season with UCF in 2022, he was redshirted and did not appear in any games. In week 3 of the 2023 season, McClain got his first start with UCF after John Rhys Plumlee went down with a leg injury and completed 20 of 28 passes for 321 yards and two touchdowns, adding 44 rushing yards, in a 48-14 win over Villanova. In week 5, he completed 13 of 25 passing attempts for 234 yards and two touchdowns, while also adding a touchdown with his legs, in a 36-35 loss to Baylor. During the game, McClain executed a viral fourth-down conversion in which he scrambled near his own goal line to avoid multiple defenders before completing a pass to RJ Harvey for a first down; the play was accompanied by an excited call from FS1 announcer Eric Collins, who exclaimed "McClain!" multiple times. On April 15, 2024, McClain entered the transfer portal after UCF brought in quarterback KJ Jefferson.

=== Arkansas State ===
On May 3, 2024, it was announced that McClain would be transferring to Arkansas State. He competed for the starting quarterback job with Jaylen Raynor. Raynor was named the starter to open the season. Trailing 28–3 in the second half of week 3 against Michigan, McClain made his Red Wolves debut when he relieved Raynor. McClain threw his first two touchdown passes of the season in back to back drives in his only two series. He relieved Raynor once again the following week against Iowa State and threw his third touchdown of the season for the Red Wolves only score of the game.

On December 9, 2024, McClain announced that he would enter the transfer portal for the third time.

=== Bethune-Cookman ===
On December 28, 2024, McClain announced that he would transfer to Bethune–Cookman. In his first appearance against FIU, he threw for 164 yards and no interceptions. Against Alabama State on October 14, he threw for 266 yards in the 52-35 loss. In his final college game, McClain led Bethune–Cookman to a 38–34 victory over Florida A&M in the Florida Classic, throwing for 274 yards and four touchdowns including the game-winning score with 27 seconds remaining, and was named MVP.

=== Statistics ===
Year	Team	Games			Passing								Rushing			
Year	Team	GP	GS	Record	Cmp	Att	Pct	Yds	Avg	TD	Int	Rtg	Att	Yds	Avg	TD
2021	USF	11	9	2–7	145	262	55.3	1,888	7.2	5	7	116.8	123	238	1.9	4
2022	UCF	0	0	—	Redshirted (redshirt)											
2023	UCF	7	3	1–2	64	102	62.7	1,065	10.4	9	3	173.7	42	104	2.5	1
2024	ARST	4	0	—	14	21	66.7	163	7.8	3	0	179.0	19	39	2.1	1
2025	BCU	9	2	0–2	103	144	71.5	1,131	7.9	7	2	150.8	52	127	2.4	3
FBS career		22	12	3–9	223	385	57.9	3,116	8.1	17	10	135.3	184	381	2.1	6
FCS career		9	2	0–2	103	144	71.5	1,131	7.9	7	2	150.8	52	127	2.4	3
