= 2025 Bethune–Cookman Wildcats football team =

American college football season

2025 Bethune–Cookman Wildcats football
- Conference: Southwestern Athletic Conference
- East Division
- Record: 6–6 (5–3 SWAC)
- Head coach: Raymond Woodie Jr. (3rd season)
- Offensive coordinator: Donte' Pimpleton (1st season)
- Defensive coordinator: Robert Wimberly (3rd season)
- Co-defensive coordinator: Otis Mound (1st season)
- Home stadium: Daytona Stadium

2025 Southwestern Athletic Conference football standings
	Conf.			Overall
Team	W		L	W		L
East Division
Jackson State xy	7	–	1	9	–	3
Alabama State x	7	–	1	10	–	2
Bethune–Cookman	5	–	3	6	–	6
Florida A&M	4	–	4	5	–	7
Alabama A&M	1	–	7	4	–	8
Mississippi Valley State*	1	–	7	2	–	10
West Division
Prairie View A&M xy$	7	–	1	10	–	4
Texas Southern	5	–	3	6	–	5
Alcorn State	4	–	4	5	–	7
Grambling State	4	–	4	7	–	5
Arkansas–Pine Bluff*	2	–	6	4	–	8
Southern	1	–	7	2	–	10
Championship: Prairie View A&M 23, Jackson State 21
$ – Conference champion; x – Division champion/co-champions; y – Championship game participant; * – Ineligible for FCS postseason play due to failed academic requirements; Rankings from STATS Poll

The 2025 Bethune–Cookman Wildcats football team represented Bethune–Cookman University as a member of the Southwestern Athletic Conference (SWAC) during the 2025 NCAA Division I FCS football season. The Wildcats were led by third-year head coach Raymond Woodie Jr. and played at Daytona Stadium in Daytona Beach, FL.

== Offseason ==
=== Transfers ===
==== Outgoing ====
Player	Position	Destination
Marcus Velez	TE	Buffalo
Ebenezer Dibula	DL	Kennesaw State
Anthony Frederique	P	Missouri State
Jaylen Booker	OL	South Alabama
Thomas Nance	TE	Temple
Dennis Palmer	RB	Troy
Jeffson Lafontant	DL	UCF
Kevin Washington Jr.	LB	Western Illinois

==== Incoming ====
Player	Position	Previous school
Kriston Bell	OL	Alabama State
Timothy McClain	QB	Arkansas State
Javin Dames	WR	Bryant
Laron Davis	DT	Charleston Southern
Amari Jones	QB	FIU
Jaden Williams	DB	FIU
Maleek McNeil	OL	Georgia State
Isaiah Washburn	LB	Mercer
Josh Evans	WR	Middle Tennessee
Devin Gunter	DB	Nevada
Montravius Lloyd	RB	Pittsburgh
Abram Fofana	DT	Stetson
Rickie Shaw	WR	Wofford

== Schedule ==
Date	Time	Opponent	Site	TV	Result	Attendance
August 29	7:00 p.m.	at FIU*	Pitbull Stadium; Miami, FL	ESPN+	L 9–42	18,034
September 6	7:00 p.m.	at No. 5 (FBS) Miami*	Hard Rock Stadium; Miami Gardens, FL	ACCNX/ESPN+	L 3–45	60,617
September 13	6:00 p.m.	at South Carolina State*	Oliver C. Dawson Stadium; Orangeburg, SC	ESPN+	L 41–55	9,026
September 20	3:00 p.m.	Edward Waters*	Daytona Stadium; Daytona Beach, FL	HBCU Go	W 35–9	7,927
September 27	3:00 p.m.	Alabama A&M	Daytona Stadium; Daytona Beach, FL	SWAC TV	W 41–34	5,630
October 4	3:00 p.m.	at Alabama State	ASU Stadium; Montgomery, AL	SWAC TV	L 35–52	24,736
October 11	3:00 p.m.	Southern	Daytona Stadium; Daytona Beach, FL	SWAC TV	W 46–14	5,257
October 25	3:00 p.m.	Arkansas–Pine Bluff^{†}	Daytona Stadium; Daytona Beach, FL	SWAC TV	W 31–14	9,850
November 1	3:00 p.m.	Mississippi Valley State	Daytona Stadium; Daytona Beach, FL	SWAC TV	W 42–34	4,534
November 8	3:00 p.m.	at Grambling State	Eddie Robinson Stadium; Grambling, LA	SWAC TV	L 23–31	6,237
November 15	1:00 p.m.	at No. 22 Jackson State	Mississippi Veterans Memorial Stadium; Jackson, MS	theGrio	L 13–28	23,348
November 22	3:30 p.m.	vs. Florida A&M	Camping World Stadium; Orlando, FL (Florida Classic)	ESPN+	W 38–34	55,528
*Non-conference game; ^{†}Homecoming; Rankings from STATS Poll released prior to the game; All times are in Eastern time

== Game summaries ==
=== at FIU (FBS) ===
Game One – Bethune–Cookman Wildcats (0–0) at FIU Panthers (FBS) (0–0) – Game summary

Quarter	1	2	3	4	Total
Wildcats	3	3	0	3	9
Panthers (FBS)	7	21	7	7	42

at Pitbull Stadium • Miami, FL

- Date: Friday August 29, 2025
- Game time: 7:00 p.m. EDT
- Game weather: Rain • Temperature: 78 °F (26 °C) • Wind: NW at 6 miles per hour (9.7 km/h)
- Game attendance: 18,034
- Referee: Reed Brotherton
- TV announcers (ESPN+): Steve Goldstein (play-by-play) and Kim Bokamper (analyst)

Game information

First quarter

- BCU – Juan Dominguez 35-yard field goal, 11:46. Wildcats 3–0. Drive: 7 plays, 62 yards, 3:10.
- FIU – Kejon Owens 2-yard run (Robert Czeremcha kick), 8:34. Panthers 7–3. Drive: 7 plays, 67 yards, 3:07.

Second quarter

- FIU – Kejon Owens 6-yard run (Robert Czeremcha kick), 14:49. Panthers 14–3. Drive: 15 plays, 89 yards, 7:04.
- FIU – Keyone Jenkins 6-yard run (Robert Czeremcha kick), 9:43. Panthers 21–3. Drive: 9 plays, 75 yards, 3:36.
- FIU – Devonte Lyons 35-yard run (Robert Czeremcha kick), 5:17. Panthers 28–3. Drive: 5 plays, 70 yards, 2:12.
- BCU – Juan Dominguez 22-yard field goal, 1:29. Panthers 28–6. Drive: 12 plays, 70 yards, 3:48.

Third quarter

- FIU – Keyone Jenkins 4-yard run (Robert Czeremcha kick), 12:44. Panthers 35–6. Drive: 3 plays, 12 yards, 1:00.

Fourth quarter

- BCU – Juan Dominguez 28-yard field goal, 12:12. Panthers 35–9. Drive: 12 plays, 62 yards, 4:32.
- FIU – Anthony Carrie 2-yard run (Robert Czeremcha kick), 7:01. Panthers 42–9. Drive: 10 plays, 76 yards, 5:06.

Statistics	BCU	FIU
First downs	17	28
Plays–yards	69–346	73–456
Rushes–yards	30–105	38–223
Passing yards	241	233
Passing: Comp–Att–Int	23–39–0	22–35–0
Turnovers	1	1
Time of possession	27:59	32:01

Team	Category	Player	Statistics
Bethune–Cookman	Passing	Timmy McClain	18/28, 164 yards
Bethune–Cookman	Rushing	Marqui Johnson	9 carries, 76 yards
Bethune–Cookman	Receiving	Javon Ross	6 receptions, 109 yards
FIU	Passing	Keyone Jenkins	18/30, 187 yards
FIU	Rushing	Kejon Owens	11 carries, 71 yards, 2 TD
FIU	Receiving	Eric Nelson	2 receptions, 47 yards

=== at No. 5 (FBS) Miami (FL) ===
Bethune–Cookman Wildcats (0-1) at No. 5 (FBS) Miami Hurricanes (1-0) – Game summary

Quarter	1	2	3	4	Total
Wildcats	0	3	0	0	3
No. 5 (FBS) Hurricanes	14	14	7	10	45

at Hard Rock Stadium • Miami Gardens, FL

- Date: September 6
- Game time: 7:00 PM EDT
- Game weather: Cloudy • Temperature: 83 °F (28 °C) • Wind: SW at 2 miles per hour (3.2 km/h)
- Game attendance: 60,617
- Referee: Rory Bernard
- TV announcers (ACCNX/ESPN+): Mike Corey (play-by-play), Tyoka Jackson (analyst), and Madison Hock (sideline)

Game information

First quarter

- (9:16) MIA – C.J. Daniels Toney 40-yard pass from Carson Beck, Carter Davis kick (Drive: 8 plays, 70 yards, 2:42; Miami 7–0)
- (2:34) MIA – Mark Fletcher Jr. 16-yard run, Carter Davis kick (Drive: 9 plays, 74 yards, 4:33; Miami 7–0)

Second quarter

- (9:55) MIA – CharMar Brown 2-yard run, Carter Davis kick (Drive: 8 plays, 68 yards, 4:08; Miami 21–0)
- (3:08) MIA – Juan Dominguez 32-yard field goal (Drive: 11 plays, 60 yards, 6:47; Miami 21–3)
- (2:34) MIA – C.J. Daniels 5-yard pass from Carson Beck, Bert Auburn kick (Drive: 11 plays, 71 yards, 2:24; Miami 28–3)

Third quarter

- (10:39) MIA – Mark Fletcher Jr. 1-yard run, Bert Auburn kick (Drive: 9 plays, 75 yards, 4:21; Miami 35–3)

Fourth quarter

- (13:52) MIA – Girard Pringle Jr. 30-yard run, Will Rocha kick (Drive: 5 plays, 69 yards, 1:57; Miami 42–3)
- (1:56) MIA – Brett Auburn 31-yard field goal (Drive: 13 plays, 67 yards, 6:11; Miami 45–3)

Statistics	BCU	MIA
First downs	14	31
Total yards	191	543
Rushing yards	92	199
Passing yards	99	344
Passing: Comp–Att–Int	14–18–1	30–36–0
Time of possession	31:55	28:05

Team	Category	Player	Statistics
Bethune–Cookman	Passing	Timmy McClain	13/16, 86 yards
Bethune–Cookman	Rushing	Camron Ransom	5 carries, 39 yards
Bethune–Cookman	Receiving	Javon Ross	4 receptions, 22 yards
Miami (FL)	Passing	Carson Beck	22/24, 267 yards, 2 TD
Miami (FL)	Rushing	Mark Fletcher Jr.	11 carries, 86 yards, 2 TD
Miami (FL)	Receiving	Malachi Toney	6 receptions, 80 yards

=== at South Carolina State ===
Bethune–Cookman Wildcats (0-2) at South Carolina State Bulldogs (1-1) – Game summary

Quarter	1	2	3	4	Total
Wildcats	0	7	6	28	41
Bulldogs	24	3	14	14	55

at Oliver C. Dawson Stadium • Orangeburg, SC

- Date: September 13
- Game time: 6:00 PM EDT
- Game weather: Sunny • Temperature: 85 °F (29 °C)
- Game attendance: 9,026
- Referee: Jason Soistman
- TV announcers (ESPN+): De Hansen (play-by-play) and Steve Foster (analyst)

Game information
First quarter
- SCST – Ryan Stubblefield 3-yard run (Nico Cavanillas Alti kick), 10:20. Bulldogs 7–0. Drive: 14 plays, 83 yards, 4:35.
- SCST – K. Z. Adams 1-yard run (Nico Cavanillas Alti kick), 6:09. Bulldogs 14–0. Drive: 7 plays, 63 yards, 2:22.
- SCST – Malik Harp 4-yard fumble return (Nico Cavanillas Alti kick), 4:39. Bulldogs 21–0.
- SCST – Nico Cavanillas Alti 44-yard field goal, 0:13. Bulldogs 24–0. Drive: 8 plays, 61 yards, 3:07.

Second quarter

- SCST – Nico Cavanillas Alti 41-yard field goal, 10:20. Bulldogs 27–0. Drive: 11 plays, 35 yards, 3:30.
- BCU – Cam'Ron Ransom 2-yard run (Juan Dominguez kick), 1:56. Bulldogs 27–7. Drive: 16 plays, 75 yards, 8:24.

Third quarter

- BCU – Myles Morales 19-yard pass from Cam'Ron Ransom (kick failed), 11:17. Bulldogs 27–13. Drive: 8 plays, 75 yards, 3:43.
- SCST – Ryan Stubblefield 13-yard run (Nico Cavanillas Alti kick), 7:53. Bulldogs 34–13. Drive: 9 plays, 67 yards, 3:16.
- SCST – Jordan Smith 8-yard pass from Ryan Stubblefield (Nico Cavanillas Alti kick), 0:04. Bulldogs 41–13. Drive: 7 plays, 80 yards, 3:51.

Fourth quarter

- BCU – Maleek Huggins 52-yard pass from Cam'Ron Ransom (Juan Dominguez kick), 13:50. Bulldogs 41–20. Drive: 3 plays, 84 yards, 1:10.
- BCU – Cam'Ron Ransom 11-yard run (Juan Dominguez kick), 9:01. Bulldogs 41–27. Drive: 7 plays, 67 yards, 3:17.
- SCST – Mason Pickett-Hicks 69-yard run (Nico Cavanillas Alti kick), 6:54. Bulldogs 48–27. Drive: 4 plays, 84 yards, 1:58.
- BCU – Lorenzo Jenkins 21-yard pass from Cam'Ron Ransom (Juan Dominguez kick), 3:58. Bulldogs 48–34. Drive: 7 plays, 75 yards, 2:51.
- SCST – Tyler Smith 2-yard run (Nico Cavanillas Alti kick), 0:41. Bulldogs 55–34. Drive: 8 plays, 74 yards, 3:16.
- BCU – Maleek Huggins 35-yard pass from Cam'Ron Ransom (Juan Dominguez kick), 0:07. Bulldogs 55–41. Drive: 4 plays, 35 yards, 0:23.

Statistics	BCU	SCST
First downs	29	28
Total yards	507	561
Rushing yards	182	226
Passing yards	325	335
Passing: Comp–Att–Int	23–38–1	22–37–0
Time of possession	31:26	28:34

Team	Category	Player	Statistics
Bethune–Cookman	Passing	Cam'Ron Ransom	20/30, 302 yards, 4 TD
Bethune–Cookman	Rushing	Cam'Ron Ransom	11 carries, 78 yards, TD
Bethune–Cookman	Receiving	Maleek Huggins	8 receptions, 148 yards, 2 TD
South Carolina State	Passing	Ryan Stubblefield	21/35, 286 yards, TD
South Carolina State	Rushing	Mason Pickett-Hicks	4 carries, 87 yards, TD
South Carolina State	Receiving	Jordan Smith	9 receptions, 87 yards, TD

=== Edward Waters (DII) ===
Edward Waters Tigers (DII) (3-0) vs. Bethune–Cookman Wildcats (0-3) – Game summary

Quarter	1	2	3	4	Total
Tigers (DII)	0	6	0	3	9
Wildcats	7	7	21	0	35

at Daytona Stadium • Daytona Beach, FL

- Date: September 20
- Game time: 3:00 PM EDT
- Game weather: Sunny • Temperature: 85 °F (29 °C) • Wind: NE at 10 miles per hour (16 km/h)
- Game attendance: 7,927
- Referee: Nathan Pinkard
- TV announcers (HBCU Go): Vaughn Wilson (play-by-play), Jon Kelley (analyst) and Lawrencia Moten (sideline)

Game information

First Quarter

- (3:07) BCU – Maleek Huggins 20-yard pass from Cam'Ron Ransom, Juan Dominguez kick (Drive: 5 plays, 25 yards, 2:57; Bethune–Cookman 7–0)

Second Quarter

- (3:13) BCU – Alihaja Scott Jr. 9-yard pass from Cam'Ron Ransom, Juan Dominguez kick (Drive: 3 plays, 45 yards, 1:13; Bethune–Cookman 14–0)
- (1:13) EWU – Makai Lovett 23-yard pass from Noah Bodden (Drive: 8 plays, 75 yards, 2:00; Bethune–Cookman 14–6)

Third Quarter

- (9:27) BCU – Khamani Robinson 75-yard run, Juan Dominguez kick (Drive: 3 plays, 84 yards, 1:32; Bethune–Cookman 21–6)
- (4:44) BCU – Maleek Huggins 82-yard pass from Cam'Ron Ransom, Juan Dominguez kick (Drive: 5 plays, 92 yards, 2:12; Bethune–Cookman 28–6)
- (3:14) BCU – Naim Lassiter 40-yard interception, Juan Dominguez kick (Bethune–Cookman 35–6)

Fourth Quarter

- (6:04) EWU – Ryan Gagne 41-yard field goal (Drive: 17 plays, 67 yards, 9:16; Bethune–Cookman 35–9)

Statistics	EAU	BCU
First downs	20	15
Total yards	247	437
Rushing yards	74	228
Passing yards	173	209
Passing: Comp–Att–Int	19–40–4	13–23–1
Time of possession	30:49	29:11

Team	Category	Player	Statistics
Edward Waters	Passing	Noah Bodden	18/38, 167 yards, TD, 3 INT
Edward Waters	Rushing	Johntarrious Thomas	8 carries, 59 yards
Edward Waters	Receiving	Torey Morrison	5 receptions, 52 yards
Bethune–Cookman	Passing	Cam'Ron Ransom	10/20, 172 yards, 3 TD, INT
Bethune–Cookman	Rushing	Khamani Robinson	12 carries, 114 yards, TD
Bethune–Cookman	Receiving	Maleek Huggins	6 receptions, 177 yards, 2 TD

=== Alabama A&M ===
Alabama A&M Bulldogs (3-1) vs. Bethune–Cookman Wildcats (1-3) – Game summary

Quarter	1	2	3	4	Total
Bulldogs	10	7	14	3	34
Wildcats	7	20	7	7	41

at Daytona Stadium • Daytona Beach, FL

- Date: September 27
- Game time: 3:00 PM EDT
- Game weather: Sunny • Temperature: 86 °F (30 °C) • Wind: NE at 3 miles per hour (4.8 km/h)
- Game attendance: 5,630
- Referee: Preston Clipper
- TV announcers (SWAC TV): Kenny Schierlinger (play-by-play) and Davion Belk (analyst)

Statistics	AAMU	BCU
First downs		
Total yards		
Rushing yards		
Passing yards		
Passing: Comp–Att–Int		
Time of possession		

Team	Category	Player	Statistics
Alabama A&M	Passing		
Alabama A&M	Rushing		
Alabama A&M	Receiving		
Bethune–Cookman	Passing		
Bethune–Cookman	Rushing		
Bethune–Cookman	Receiving		

=== at Alabama State ===
Bethune–Cookman Wildcats (2-3) vs. Alabama State Hornets (3-1) – Game summary

Quarter	1	2	3	4	Total
Wildcats	7	7	7	14	35
Hornets	17	14	14	7	52

at ASU Stadium • Montgomery, AL

- Date: October 4
- Game time: 2:30 PM CDT
- Game weather: Cloudy • Temperature: 82 °F (28 °C) • Wind: E at 10 miles per hour (16 km/h)
- Game attendance: 24,736
- Referee: Ivan Daniels
- TV announcers (SWAC TV): Santoria Black (play-by-play), Ossie Clark (analyst) and Faith Daniels (sideline)

Statistics	BCU	ALST
First downs		
Total yards		
Rushing yards		
Passing yards		
Passing: Comp–Att–Int		
Time of possession		

Team	Category	Player	Statistics
Bethune–Cookman	Passing		
Bethune–Cookman	Rushing		
Bethune–Cookman	Receiving		
Alabama State	Passing		
Alabama State	Rushing		
Alabama State	Receiving		

=== Southern ===
Southern Jaguars (1-4) vs. Bethune–Cookman Wildcats (2-4) – Game summary

Quarter	1	2	3	4	Total
Jaguars	7	0	0	7	14
Wildcats	7	14	17	7	45

at Municipal Stadium • Daytona Beach, FL

- Date: October 11
- Game time: 3:00 PM EDT
- Game weather: Rain • Temperature: 74 °F (23 °C) • Wind: NW at 14 miles per hour (23 km/h)
- Game attendance: 5,257
- Referee: Charles Green
- TV announcers (SWAC TV): Kenny Schierlinger (play-by-play) and Messod Bendayan (analyst)

Statistics	SOU	BCU
First downs		
Total yards		
Rushing yards		
Passing yards		
Passing: Comp–Att–Int		
Time of possession		

Team	Category	Player	Statistics
Southern	Passing		
Southern	Rushing		
Southern	Receiving		
Bethune–Cookman	Passing		
Bethune–Cookman	Rushing		
Bethune–Cookman	Receiving		

=== Arkansas–Pine Bluff ===
Arkansas–Pine Bluff (3-4) vs. Bethune–Cookman Wildcats (3-4) – Game summary

Quarter	1	2	3	4	Total
Golden Lions	0	7	7	0	14
Wildcats	7	7	14	3	31

at Daytona Stadium • Daytona Beach, FL

- Date: October 25
- Game time: 3:00 PM EDT
- Game weather: Sunny • Temperature: 80 °F (27 °C) • Wind: E at 14 miles per hour (23 km/h)
- Game attendance: 9,850
- Referee: Ivan Daniels
- TV announcers (SWAC TV): Kenny Schierlinger (play-by-play) and Messod Bendayan (analyst)

Statistics	UAPB	BCU
First downs		
Total yards		
Rushing yards		
Passing yards		
Passing: Comp–Att–Int		
Time of possession		

Team	Category	Player	Statistics
Arkansas–Pine Bluff	Passing		
Arkansas–Pine Bluff	Rushing		
Arkansas–Pine Bluff	Receiving		
Bethune–Cookman	Passing		
Bethune–Cookman	Rushing		
Bethune–Cookman	Receiving		

=== Mississippi Valley State ===
Mississippi Valley State Delta Devils (1-6) vs. Bethune–Cookman Wildcats (4-4) – Game summary

Quarter	1	2	3	4	Total
Delta Devils	-	-	-	-	0
Wildcats	-	-	-	-	0

at Daytona Stadium • Daytona Beach, FL

- Date: November 1
- Game time: 3:00 PM EDT
- TV announcers (SWAC TV): Kenny Schierlinger (play by play) and Davion Belk (analyst)

Statistics	MVSU	BCU
First downs		
Total yards		
Rushing yards		
Passing yards		
Passing: Comp–Att–Int		
Time of possession		

Team	Category	Player	Statistics
Mississippi Valley State	Passing		
Mississippi Valley State	Rushing		
Mississippi Valley State	Receiving		
Bethune–Cookman	Passing		
Bethune–Cookman	Rushing		
Bethune–Cookman	Receiving		

=== at Grambling State ===
Bethune–Cookman Wildcats (5-4) vs. Grambling State Tigers (6-3) – Game summary

Quarter	1	2	3	4	Total
Wildcats	-	-	-	-	0
Tigers	-	-	-	-	0

at Eddie Robinson Stadium • Grambling, LA

- Date: November 8
- TV announcers (SWAC TV): Butch Alsandor (play by play) and Jorge Vargas (analyst)

Statistics	BCU	GRAM
First downs		
Total yards		
Rushing yards		
Passing yards		
Passing: Comp–Att–Int		
Time of possession		

Team	Category	Player	Statistics
Bethune–Cookman	Passing		
Bethune–Cookman	Rushing		
Bethune–Cookman	Receiving		
Grambling State	Passing		
Grambling State	Rushing		
Grambling State	Receiving		

=== at No. 22 Jackson State ===
Bethune–Cookman Wildcats (5-5) vs. No. 22 Jackson State Tigers (7-2) – Game summary

Quarter	1	2	3	4	Total
Wildcats	-	-	-	-	0
No. 22 Tigers	-	-	-	-	0

at Mississippi Veterans Memorial Stadium • Jackson, MS

- Date: November 15
- Game time: 1:00 PM EDT
- TV announcers (TheGrio): Derrin Horton (play by play), Steve Wyche (analyst) and Nia Symone (sideline reporter)

Statistics	BCU	JKST
First downs		
Total yards		
Rushing yards		
Passing yards		
Passing: Comp–Att–Int		
Time of possession		

Team	Category	Player	Statistics
Bethune–Cookman	Passing		
Bethune–Cookman	Rushing		
Bethune–Cookman	Receiving		
Jackson State	Passing		
Jackson State	Rushing		
Jackson State	Receiving		

=== Florida A&M (Florida Classic) ===
Florida A&M Rattlers (0-0) vs. Bethune–Cookman Wildcats (0-0) – Game summary

Quarter	1	2	3	4	Total
Rattlers	-	-	-	-	0
Wildcats	-	-	-	-	0

at Camping World Stadium • Orlando, FL

- Date: November 22
- Game time: 3:30 PM EST
- TV announcers (ESPN+): Tiffany Greene (play by play) and Jay Walker (analyst)

Statistics	FAMU	BCU
First downs		
Total yards		
Rushing yards		
Passing yards		
Passing: Comp–Att–Int		
Time of possession		

Team	Category	Player	Statistics
Florida A&M	Passing		
Florida A&M	Rushing		
Florida A&M	Receiving		
Bethune–Cookman	Passing		
Bethune–Cookman	Rushing		
Bethune–Cookman	Receiving		
