= 2025 Prairie View A&M Panthers football team =

American college football season

2025 Prairie View A&M Panthers football
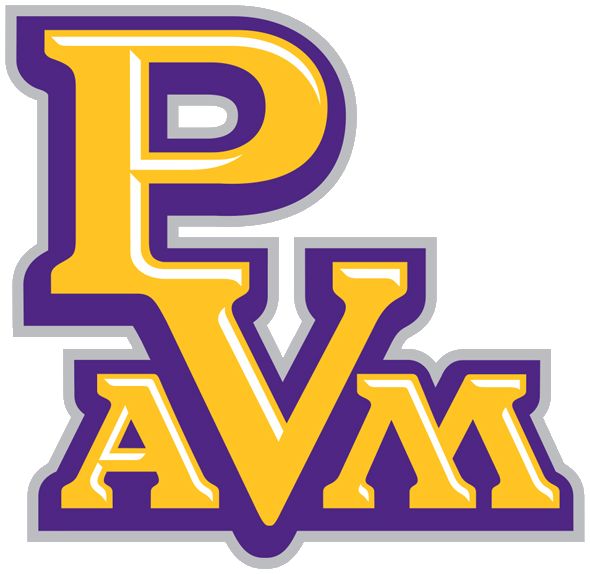

SWAC champion SWAC West Division champion

SWAC Championship Game, W 23–21 vs. Jackson State

Celebration Bowl, L 38–40 ^{4OT} vs. South Carolina State
- Conference: Southwestern Athletic Conference
- West Division
- Record: 10–4 (7–1 SWAC)
- Head coach: Tremaine Jackson (1st season)
- Offensive coordinator: Christopher Buckner (1st season)
- Offensive scheme: Spread
- Co-defensive coordinators: Brandon Andersen (1st season); Trent Earley (1st season)
- Base defense: 3–4
- Home stadium: Panther Stadium at Blackshear Field

2025 Southwestern Athletic Conference football standings
	Conf.			Overall
Team	W		L	W		L
East Division
Jackson State xy	7	–	1	9	–	3
Alabama State x	7	–	1	10	–	2
Bethune–Cookman	5	–	3	6	–	6
Florida A&M	4	–	4	5	–	7
Alabama A&M	1	–	7	4	–	8
Mississippi Valley State*	1	–	7	2	–	10
West Division
Prairie View A&M xy$	7	–	1	10	–	4
Texas Southern	5	–	3	6	–	5
Alcorn State	4	–	4	5	–	7
Grambling State	4	–	4	7	–	5
Arkansas–Pine Bluff*	2	–	6	4	–	8
Southern	1	–	7	2	–	10
Championship: Prairie View A&M 23, Jackson State 21
$ – Conference champion; x – Division champion/co-champions; y – Championship game participant; * – Ineligible for FCS postseason play due to failed academic requirements; Rankings from STATS Poll

The 2025 Prairie View A&M Panthers football team represented Prairie View A&M University as a member of the Southwestern Athletic Conference (SWAC) during the 2025 NCAA Division I FCS football season. The Panthers were led by first-year head coach Tremaine Jackson and played at the Panther Stadium at Blackshear Field in Prairie View, Texas.

The Panthers finished the regular season with an overall record of 9–3, going 7–1 in conference play to finish first in the West Division. In the SWAC Championship Game, Prairie View A&M faced off against Jackson State, winning 23–21 to win the program's first SWAC title since 2009. As the winners of the SWAC, the Panthers were selected to the Celebration Bowl, the first appearance in program history and the first team west of Louisiana to appear in the game, to face off against the winner of the MEAC, South Carolina State; the Panthers would lose the Celebration Bowl 38–40 in four overtimes.

== Offseason ==
On November 24, 2024, Prairie View athletic director Anton Goff announced that the contract of head coach Bubba McDowell would not be renewed following a 5–7 season. On December 21, 2024, Valdosta State head coach Tremaine Jackson was named the Panthers' new head coach.

== Preseason ==
The SWAC released its preseason prediction poll on July 16, 2025. The Panthers were predicted to finish third in the SWAC West, while also receiving a first place vote.

== Schedule ==
Date	Time	Opponent	Site	TV	Result	Attendance
August 30	7:00 p.m.	at Texas Southern	Shell Energy Stadium; Houston, TX (Labor Day Classic)	SWAC TV	W 22–21	19,638
September 6	6:00 p.m.	UT Rio Grande Valley*	Panther Stadium; Prairie View, TX	SWAC TV	L 21–27	6,326
September 13	6:00 p.m.	at Rice*	Rice Stadium; Houston, TX	ESPN+	L 17–38	22,260
September 20	6:00 p.m.	Northwestern State*	Panther Stadium; Prairie View, TX	SWAC TV	W 27–24	4,559
September 27	6:00 p.m.	vs. Grambling State	Cotton Bowl; Dallas, TX (State Fair Classic)	SWAC TV	W 28–13	56,210
October 4	3:00 p.m.	at Alcorn State	Casem-Spinks Stadium; Lorman, MS	SWAC TV	W 13–12	4,322
October 18	4:00 p.m.	at Southern	A. W. Mumford Stadium; Baton Rouge, LA	HBCU Go	W 24–3	23,715
October 25	2:00 p.m.	Lincoln (CA)*^{†}	Panther Stadium; Prairie View, TX	SWAC TV	W 38–0	11,427
November 1	2:00 p.m.	Alabama State	Panther Stadium; Prairie View, TX	SWAC TV	L 28–31	5,962
November 8	2:00 p.m.	at Alabama A&M	Louis Crews Stadium; Huntsville, AL	SWAC TV	W 48–5	1,126
November 15	2:00 p.m.	Arkansas–Pine Bluff	Panther Stadium; Prairie View, TX	SWAC TV	W 56–9	7,069
November 22	2:00 p.m.	Mississippi Valley State	Panther Stadium; Prairie View, TX	SWAC TV	W 59–6	4,688
December 6	1:00 p.m.	at No. 20 Jackson State	Mississippi Veterans Memorial Stadium; Jackson, MS (SWAC Championship)	ESPN2	W 23–21	32,187
December 13	11:00 a.m.	vs. South Carolina State*	Mercedes-Benz Stadium; Atlanta, GA (Celebration Bowl)	ABC	L 38–40 ^{4OT}	26,703
*Non-conference game; ^{†}Homecoming; Rankings from STATS Poll released prior to the game; All times are in Central time

== Game summaries ==
=== at Texas Southern (Labor Day Classic) ===
Prairie View A&M Panthers (0–0) at Texas Southern Tigers (0–0) – Game summary

Quarter	1	2	3	4	Total
Panthers	7	7	0	8	22
Tigers	7	7	0	7	21

at Shell Energy Stadium • Houston, Texas

- Date: August 30
- Game time: 7:00 p.m. CDT
- Game weather: Cloudy, 81 °F (27 °C)
- Game attendance: 19,368
- Referee: Ivan Daniels
- TV announcers (SWAC TV): Butch Alsandor (play by play), Jorge Vargas (analyst) and Lauren Robertson (sideline reporter)
- Box score, Recap

Game information

First quarter

- TXSO – Da'Veon Ford 10-yard run (Christian Avelar kick), 9:03. Tigers 7–0. Drive: 11 plays, 83 yards, 5:47.
- PV – Kheagian Heckaman 57-yard pass from Cameron Peters (Aiden Webb kick), 2:00. Tied 7–7. Drive: 6 plays, 85 yards, 6:46.

Second quarter

- PV – Cameron Franklin 5-yard run (Aiden Webb kick), 9:11. Panthers 14–7. Drive: 9 plays, 34 yards, 5:38.
- TXSO – Athean Renfro 20-yard run (Christian Avelar kick), 8:52. Tied 14–14. Drive: 1 play, 20 yards, 0:06.

Third quarter

No scoring plays.

Fourth quarter

- PV – Team Safety, 9:45. Panthers 16–14.
- TXSO – Roriyon Richardson 15-yard pass from KJ Cooper (Christian Avelar kick), 1:16. Tigers 21–16. Drive: 12 plays, 88 yards, 4:53.
- PV – Rodny Ojo 13-yard pass from Cameron Peters, 0:00. Panthers 22–21. Drive: 10 plays, 84 yards, 1:09.

Statistics	PV	TXSO
First downs	19	17
Total yards	425	258
Rushes–yards	30–130	30–126
Passing yards	295	132
Passing: Comp–Att–Int	22–38–1	11–16–0
Turnovers	1	0
Time of possession	38:10	21:50

Team	Category	Player	Statistics
Prairie View A&M	Passing	Cameron Peters	22/38, 295 yards, TD, INT
Prairie View A&M	Rushing	Chase Bingmon	9 rushes, 50 yards
Prairie View A&M	Receiving	Kheagian Heckaman	2 receptions, 73 yards, TD
Texas Southern	Passing	KJ Cooper	11/16, 132 yards, TD
Texas Southern	Rushing	Athean Renfro	13 rushes, 66 yards, TD
Texas Southern	Receiving	Roriyon Richardson	3 receptions, 57 yards, TD

=== UT Rio Grande Valley ===
UT Rio Grande Valley Vaqueros (1–0) at Prairie View A&M Panthers (1–0) – Game summary

Quarter	1	2	3	4	Total
Vaqueros	17	3	0	7	27
Panthers	0	7	7	7	21

at Panther Stadium • Prairie View, Texas

- Date: September 6
- Game time: 6:00 p.m. CDT
- Game weather: Cloudy
- Game attendance: 6,326
- Referee: Nathan Pinkard
- TV announcers (SWAC TV): Butch Alsandor (play by play) and Jorge Vargas (analyst)
- Box score, Recap

Game information
First quarter
- RGV – Tony Diaz 16-yard pass from Eddie Lee Marburger (Brysen Gardner kick), 10:50. Vaqueros 7–0. Drive: 14 plays, 69 yards, 4:10.
- RGV – Brysen Gardner 49-yard field goal, 6:26. Vaqueros 10–0. Drive: 4 plays, 40 yards, 2:22.
- RGV – T. J. Dement 21-yard run (Brysen Gardner kick), 2:04. Vaqueros 17–0. Drive: 6 plays, 69 yards, 3:06.

Second quarter

- PV – Cameron Peters 1-yard run (Aiden Webb kick), 6:03. Vaqueros 17–7. Drive: 9 plays, 40 yards, 3:46.
- RGV – Brysen Gardner 40-yard field goal, 4:07. Vaqueros 20–7. Drive: 7 plays, 73 yards, 1:53.

Third quarter

- PV – Tevin Carter 1-yard run (Aiden Webb kick), 8:04. Vaqueros 20–14. Drive: 8 plays, 56 yards, 3:16.

Fourth quarter

- PV – Tevin Carter 3-yard run (Aiden Webb kick), 13:00. Panthers 21–20. Drive: 20 plays, 93 yards, 7:47.
- RGV – Nathan Denney 7-yard run (Brysen Gardner kick), 2:21. Vaqueros 27–21. Drive: 8 plays, 71 yards, 3:04.

Statistics	RGV	PV
First downs	24	15
Total yards	408	300
Rushing yards	145	163
Passing yards	263	137
Passing: Comp–Att–Int	19–31–0	15–27–0
Turnovers	0	1
Time of possession	28:41	31:19

Team	Category	Player	Statistics
UT Rio Grande Valley	Passing	Eddie Lee Marburger	19/31, 263 yards, TD
UT Rio Grande Valley	Rushing	Nathan Denney	23 rushes, 101 yards, TD
UT Rio Grande Valley	Receiving	Tony Diaz	6 receptions, 121 yards, TD
Prairie View A&M	Passing	Cameron Peters	8/16, 64 yards
Prairie View A&M	Rushing	Chase Bingmon	16 rushes, 88 yards
Prairie View A&M	Receiving	Jyzaiah Rockwell	7 receptions, 98 yards

=== at Rice (FBS) ===
Prairie View A&M Panthers (1–1) at Rice Owls (FBS) (1–1) – Game summary

Quarter	1	2	3	4	Total
Panthers	7	0	3	7	17
Owls (FBS)	7	17	7	7	38

at Rice Stadium • Houston, Texas

- Date: September 13
- Game time: 6:00 p.m. CDT
- Game weather: Sunny, 90 °F (32 °C)
- Game attendance: 22,260
- Referee: Matt Overton
- TV announcers (ESPN+): Pete Sousa (play-by-play) and LaDarrin McLane (analyst)
- Box score, Recap

Game information
First quarter
- PV – Travon Jones 12-yard pass from Tevin Carter (Aiden Webb kick), 8:34. Panthers 7–0. Drive: 6 plays, 63 yards, 1:55.
- RICE – Chase Jenkins 3-yard run (Enock Gota kick), 2:28. Tied 7–7. Drive: 12 plays, 68 yards, 6:00.

Second quarter

- RICE – Aaron Turner 52-yard run (Enock Gota kick), 11:47. Owls 14–7. Drive: 7 plays, 68 yards, 3:38.
- RICE – Quinton Jackson 1-yard run (Enock Gota kick), 4:56. Owls 21–7. Drive: 9 plays, 49 yards, 4:41.
- RICE – Enock Gota 49-yard field goal, 0:50. Owls 24–7. Drive: 11 plays, 48 yards, 2:32.

Third quarter

- RICE – Landon Ransom-Goelz 34-yard pass from Chase Jenkins (Enock Gota kick), 12:19. Owls 31–7. Drive: 5 plays, 65 yards, 2:41.
- PV – Aiden Webb 28-yard field goal, 2:41. Owls 31–10. Drive: 7 plays, 52 yards, 2:46.

Fourth quarter

- RICE – Tyson Thompson 22-yard pass from Drew Devillier (Chase Allen kick), 5:40. Owls 38–10. Drive: 8 plays, 61 yards, 3:17.
- PV – Tevin Carter 6-yard run (Aiden Webb kick), 1:41. Owls 38–17. Drive: 13 plays, 75 yards, 3:59.

Statistics	PV	RICE
First downs	18	28
Plays–yards	60–251	79–461
Rushes–yards	32–100	60–347
Passing yards	151	114
Passing: comp–att–int	13–28–0	12–19–0
Turnovers	0	0
Time of possession	23:38	36:22

Team	Category	Player	Statistics
Prairie View A&M	Passing	Tevin Carter	12/27, 131 yards, TD
Prairie View A&M	Rushing	Tevin Carter	15 carries, 65 yards, TD
Prairie View A&M	Receiving	Jyzaiah Rockwell	6 receptions, 92 yards
Rice	Passing	Chase Jenkins	10/16, 87 yards, TD
Rice	Rushing	Chase Jenkins	21 carries, 124 yards, TD
Rice	Receiving	Landon Ransom-Goelz	3 receptions, 46 yards, TD

=== Northwestern State ===
Northwestern State Demons (1–2) at Prairie View A&M Panthers (1–2) – Game summary

Quarter	1	2	3	4	Total
Demons	7	3	7	7	24
Panthers	6	11	3	7	27

at Panther Stadium • Prairie View, Texas

- Date: September 20
- Game time: 6:00 p.m. CDT
- Game weather: Sunny
- Game attendance: 4,559
- Referee: Eric Blunston
- TV announcers (SWAC TV): Butch Alsandor (play-by-play) and Jorge Vargas (analyst)
- Box score, Recap

Game information
First quarter
- NWST – Camryn Davis 21-yard pass from Abram Johnston (Grayson Lytton kick), 4:31. Demons 7–0. Drive: 4 plays, 51 yards, 1:38.
- PV – Tevin Carter 56-yard run (kick failed), 3:06. Demons 7–6. Drive: 4 plays, 83 yards, 1:20.

Second quarter

- PV – Aiden Webb 28-yard field goal, 9:59. Panthers 9–7. Drive: 13 plays, 64 yards, 6:38.
- NWST – Grayson Lytton 39-yard field goal, 4:00. Demons 10–9. Drive: 11 plays, 44 yards, 5:54.
- PV – Lamagea McDowell 1-yard run (Tevin Carter pass to Kheagian Heckaman), 0:35. Panthers 17–10. Drive: 7 plays, 75 yards, 3:25.

Third quarter

- NWST – Abram Johnston 29-yard run (Grayson Lytton kick), 3:48. Tied 17–17. Drive: 3 plays, 67 yards, 0:54.
- PV – Aiden Webb 20-yard field goal, 1:07. Panthers 20–17. Drive: 7 plays, 62 yards, 2:31.

Fourth quarter

- PV – Lamagea McDowell 5-yard run (Aiden Webb kick), 5:21. Panthers 27–17. Drive: 7 plays, 67 yards, 2:44.
- NWST – Ben Buisson 44-yard pass from Abram Johnston (Grayson Lytton kick), 4:08. Panthers 27–24. Drive: 5 plays, 65 yards, 1:12.

Statistics	NWST	PV
First downs	14	19
Total yards	320	494
Rushing yards	164	346
Passing yards	156	148
Passing: Comp–Att–Int	12–21–1	15–23–1
Turnovers	2	2
Time of possession	26:20	33:40

Team	Category	Player	Statistics
Northwestern State	Passing	Abram Johnston	12/19, 156 yards, 2 TD
Northwestern State	Rushing	Abram Johnston	14 rushes, 71 yards, TD
Northwestern State	Receiving	Ben Buisson	1 reception, 44 yards, TD
Prairie View A&M	Passing	Tevin Carter	15/22, 148 yards, INT
Prairie View A&M	Rushing	Chase Bingmon	18 rushes, 180 yards
Prairie View A&M	Receiving	Jyzaiah Rockwell	5 receptions, 84 yards

=== vs. Grambling State (State Fair Classic) ===
Grambling State Tigers (3–1) vs. Prairie View A&M Panthers (2–2) – Game summary

Quarter	1	2	3	4	Total
Tigers	3	3	0	7	13
Panthers	7	7	7	7	28

at Cotton Bowl • Dallas, Texas

- Date: September 27
- Game time: 6:00 p.m. CDT
- Game weather: Sunny, 87 °F (31 °C)
- Game attendance: 61,139
- Referee: Eric Blunston
- TV announcers (SWAC TV): Butch Alsandor (play by play) and Jorge Vargas (analyst)
- Box score, Recap

Game information
First quarter
- PV – Tevin Carter 2-yard run (Aiden Webb kick), 10:15. Panthers 7–0. Drive: 8 plays, 75 yards, 3:43.
- GRAM – Theodore Caballero 27-yard field goal, 5:32. Panthers 7–3. Drive: 10 plays, 61 yards, 4:35.

Second quarter

- PV – Cameron Bonner 8-yard run (Aiden Webb kick), 8:59. Panthers 14–3. Drive: 4 plays, 51 yards, 1:43.
- GRAM – Theodore Caballero 25-yard field goal, 0:00. Panthers 14–6. Drive: 15 plays, 77 yards, 5:27.

Third quarter

- PV – Lamagea McDowell 1-yard run (Aiden Webb kick), 7:50. Panthers 21–6. Drive: 1 play, 1 yard, 0:01.

Fourth quarter

- GRAM – Keith Jones Jr. 16-yard pass from C'zavian Teasett (Theodore Caballero kick), 8:25. Panthers 21–13. Drive: 13 plays, 67 yards, 3:58.
- PV – Chase Bingmon 15-yard run (Aiden Webb kick), 2:09. Panthers 28–13. Drive: 6 plays, 80 yards, 3:08.

Statistics	GRAM	PV
First downs	17	20
Total yards	266	346
Rushing yards	105	224
Passing yards	161	122
Passing: Comp–Att–Int	21–43–3	11–24–0
Turnovers	4	2
Time of possession	30:37	29:23

Team	Category	Player	Statistics
Grambling State	Passing	C'zavian Teasett	21/43, 161 yards, TD, 3 INT
Grambling State	Rushing	Tre Bradford	14 rushes, 88 yards
Grambling State	Receiving	Covadis Knighten	4 receptions, 72 yards
Prairie View A&M	Passing	Tevin Carter	9/21, 98 yards
Prairie View A&M	Rushing	Lamagea McDowell	10 rushes, 98 yards, TD
Prairie View A&M	Receiving	Travon Jones	4 receptions, 47 yards

=== at Alcorn State ===
Prairie View A&M Panthers (3–2) at Alcorn State Braves (0–4) – Game summary

Quarter	1	2	3	4	Total
Panthers	3	7	0	3	13
Braves	3	3	6	0	12

at Casem-Spinks Stadium • Lorman, Mississippi

- Date: October 4
- Game time: 3:00 p.m. CDT
- Game weather: Sunny
- Game attendance: 4,322
- Referee: Y. N. Meyers III
- TV announcers (SWAC TV): Charles Bishop (play by play) and Charles Porter (analyst)
- Box score, Recap

Game information
First quarter
- PV – Aiden Webb 21-yard field goal, 11:00. Panthers 3–0. Drive: 14 plays, 61 yards, 3:00.
- ALCN – Lorenzo Garcia 30-yard field goal, 9:00. Tied 3–3. Drive: 11 plays, 56 yards, 1:00.

Second quarter

- PV – Jyzaiah Rockwell 13-yard pass from Cameron Peters (Aiden Webb kick), 5:03. Panthers 10–3. Drive: 7 plays, 75 yards, 2:47.
- ALCN – Lorenzo Garcia 32-yard field goal, 0:00. Panthers 10–6. Drive: 10 plays, 49 yards, 1:09.

Third quarter

- ALCN – Reggie Davis 2-yard run (kick failed), 7:07. Braves 12–10. Drive: 3 plays, 75 yards, 1:08.

Fourth quarter

- PV – Diego Alfaro 44-yard field goal, 14:54. Panthers 13–12. Drive: 8 plays, 25 yards, 4:25.

Statistics	PV	ALCN
First downs	21	16
Total yards	348	270
Rushing yards	163	94
Passing yards	185	176
Passing: Comp–Att–Int	23–33–0	11–25–1
Turnovers	0	1
Time of possession	37:13	22:47

Team	Category	Player	Statistics
Prairie View A&M	Passing	Cameron Peters	15/22, 117 yards
Prairie View A&M	Rushing	Cameron Peters	11 rushes, 66 yards
Prairie View A&M	Receiving	Jyzaiah Rockwell	7 receptions, 45 yards
Alcorn State	Passing	Jaylon Tolbert	11/22, 176 yards, INT
Alcorn State	Rushing	Reggie Davis	11 rushes, 41 yards, TD
Alcorn State	Receiving	Jacoby Matthews	4 receptions, 88 yards

=== at Southern ===
Prairie View A&M Panthers (4–2) at Southern Jaguars (1–5) – Game summary

Quarter	1	2	3	4	Total
Panthers	0	17	0	7	24
Jaguars	0	0	3	0	3

at A. W. Mumford Stadium • Baton Rouge, Louisiana

- Date: October 18
- Game time: 4:00 p.m. CDT
- Game weather: Sunny
- Game attendance: 23,715
- Referee: Eric Blunston
- TV announcers (HBCU Go): James Hadnot (play by play), Jon Kelley (analyst) and Nicole Hutchison (sideline reporter)
- Box score, Recap

Game information
First quarter
- No scoring plays

Second quarter

- PV – Lamagea McDowell 15-yard run (Aiden Webb kick), 14:54. Panthers 7–0. Drive: 7 plays, 72 yards, 3:17.
- PV – Jyzaiah Rockwell 13-yard pass from Cameron Peters (Aiden Webb kick), 9:42. Panthers 14–0. Drive: 10 plays, 59 yards, 3:25.
- PV – Aiden Webb 30-yard field goal, 0:00. Panthers 17–0. Drive: 11 plays, 72 yards, 2:18.

Third quarter

- SOU – Nathan Zimmer 36-yard field goal, 3:23. Panthers 17–3. Drive: 14 plays, 61 yards, 5:49.

Fourth quarter

- PV – Lamagea McDowell 1-yard run (Aiden Webb kick), 1:53. Panthers 24–3. Drive: 4 plays, 7 yards, 1:53.

Statistics	PV	SOU
First downs	18	16
Total yards	361	247
Rushing yards	137	166
Passing yards	224	81
Passing: Comp–Att–Int	19–31–0	12–21–1
Turnovers	0	3
Time of possession	27:55	32:05

Team	Category	Player	Statistics
Prairie View A&M	Passing	Cameron Peters	19/31, 224 yards, TD
Prairie View A&M	Rushing	Chase Bingmon	13 rushes, 64 yards
Prairie View A&M	Receiving	Chase Bingmon	2 receptions, 52 yards
Southern	Passing	Ashton Strother	12/21, 81 yards, INT
Southern	Rushing	Trey Holly	21 rushes, 99 yards
Southern	Receiving	Cam Jefferson	5 receptions, 30 yards

=== Lincoln (CA) (Ind) ===
Lincoln Oaklanders (Ind) (0–6) at Prairie View A&M Panthers (5–2) – Game summary

Quarter	1	2	3	4	Total
Oaklanders (Ind)	0	0	0	0	0
Panthers	24	0	7	7	38

at Panther Stadium • Prairie View, Texas

- Date: October 25
- Game time: 2:00 p.m. CDT
- Game weather: Cloudy, 77 °F (25 °C)
- Game attendance: 11,427
- Referee: Nathan Pinkard
- TV announcers (SWAC TV): Charles Bishop (play by play) and Charles Porter (analyst)
- Box score, Recap

Game information
First quarter
- PV – Chase Bingmon 1-yard run (Aiden Webb kick), 11:43. Panthers 7–0. Drive: 7 plays, 57 yards, 3:06.
- PV – Travon Jones 5-yard pass from Cameron Peters (Aiden Webb kick), 9:53. Panthers 14–0. Drive: 4 plays, 16 yards, 1:45.
- PV – Aiden Webb 30-yard field goal, 1:51. Panthers 17–0. Drive: 11 plays, 56 yards, 4:34.
- PV – Chase Bingmon 17-yard run (Aiden Webb kick), 0:22. Panthers 24–0. Drive: 3 plays, 60 yards, 0:51.

Second quarter

- No scoring plays

Third quarter

- PV – Cameron Peters 19-yard run (Aiden Webb kick), 4:44. Panthers 31–0. Drive: 5 plays, 63 yards, 2:14.

Fourth quarter

- PV – Jyzaiah Rockwell 70-yard pass from Cameron Peters (Aiden Webb kick), 7:46. Panthers 38–0. Drive: 3 plays, 75 yards, 8:08.

Statistics	LCLN	PV
First downs	4	17
Total yards	63	423
Rushing yards	21	165
Passing yards	42	258
Passing: Comp–Att–Int	4–11–0	12–21–0
Turnovers	2	0
Time of possession	21:18	38:42

Team	Category	Player	Statistics
Lincoln (CA)	Passing	Anastacio Prado	4/11, 42 yards
Lincoln (CA)	Rushing	Rodney Washington	3 rushes, 15 yards
Lincoln (CA)	Receiving	Trey Dimmings	1 reception, 29 yards
Prairie View A&M	Passing	Cameron Peters	11/18, 243 yards, 2 TD
Prairie View A&M	Rushing	Lamagea McDowell	7 rushes, 47 yards
Prairie View A&M	Receiving	Jyzaiah Rockwell	3 receptions, 104 yards, TD

=== Alabama State ===
Alabama State Hornets (5–2) at Prairie View A&M Panthers (6–2) – Game summary

Quarter	1	2	3	4	Total
Hornets	7	14	10	0	31
Panthers	14	7	0	7	28

at Panther Stadium • Prairie View, Texas

- Date: November 1
- Game time: 2:00 p.m. CDT
- Game weather: Cloudy, 73 °F (23 °C)
- Game attendance: 5,962
- Referee: Eric Blunston
- TV announcers (SWAC TV): Butch Alsandor (play by play), Jorge Vargas (analyst) and Shaquira Martin (sideline reporter)
- Box score, Recap

Game information
First quarter
- PV – Chase Bingmon 2-yard run (Aiden Webb kick), 11:00. Panthers 7–0. Drive: 10 plays, 65 yards, 4:00.
- PV – Rodny Ojo 19-yard pass from Cameron Peters (Aiden Webb kick), 5:31. Panthers 14–0. Drive: 7 plays, 52 yards, 2:46.
- ALST – Andrew Body 7-yard run (Andrew Abu-Akel kick), 2:57. Panthers 14–7. Drive: 7 plays, 75 yards, 2:34.

Second quarter

- PV – Andre Dennis 12-yard pass from Cameron Peters (Aiden Webb kick), 12:33. Panthers 21–7. Drive: 13 plays, 58 yards, 5:14.
- ALST – Marcus Harris II 10-yard run (Andrew Abu-Akel kick), 9:53. Panthers 21–14. Drive: 2 plays, 11 yards, 0:10.
- ALST – Andrew Body 4-yard run (Andrew Abu-Akel kick), 5:50. Tied 21–21. Drive: 5 plays, 63 yards, 2:43.

Third quarter

- ALST – Andrew Abu-Akel 37-yard field goal, 12:46. Hornets 24–21. Drive: 7 plays, 45 yards, 2:14.
- ALST – Marcus Harris II 2-yard run (Andrew Abu Akel kick), 8:30. Hornets 31–21. Drive: 6 plays, 27 yards, 3:00.

Fourth quarter

- PV – Rodny Ojo 29-yard pass from Cameron Peters (Aiden Webb kick), 6:12. Hornets 31–28. Drive: 7 plays, 80 yards, 2:13.

Statistics	ALST	PV
First downs	18	26
Total yards	334	437
Rushing yards	213	248
Passing yards	121	189
Passing: Comp–Att–Int	9–16–0	16–35–4
Turnovers	1	4
Time of possession	29:31	30:29

Team	Category	Player	Statistics
Alabama State	Passing	Andrew Body	5/7, 79 yards
Alabama State	Rushing	Jamarie Hostzclaw	21 rushes, 127 yards
Alabama State	Receiving	Jalen Jones	2 receptions, 54 yards
Prairie View A&M	Passing	Cameron Peters	16/34, 189 yards, 3 TD, 4 INT
Prairie View A&M	Rushing	Chase Bingmon	23 rushes, 118 yards, TD
Prairie View A&M	Receiving	Rodny Ojo	3 receptions, 60 yards, TD

=== at Alabama A&M ===
Prairie View A&M Panthers (6–3) at Alabama A&M Bulldogs (4–5) – Game summary

Quarter	1	2	3	4	Total
Panthers	0	13	14	21	48
Bulldogs	3	2	0	0	5

at Louis Crews Stadium • Huntsville, Alabama

- Date: November 8
- Game time: 2:00 p.m. CST
- Game weather: Sunny
- Game attendance: 11,126
- Referee: Eric Blunston
- TV announcers (SWAC TV): Mo Carter (play by play) and Reggie Flood (analyst)
- Box score, Recap

Game information
First quarter
- AAMU – David Faulk 33-yard field goal, 4:54. Bulldogs 3–0. Drive: 8 plays, 51 yards, 3:00.

Second quarter

- AAMU – Chase Bingmon tackled in own end zone, 11:54. Bulldogs 5–0.
- PV – Ja'Koby Banks 39-yard pass from Cameron Peters (Diego Alfaro kick), 5:14. Panthers 7–5. Drive: 3 plays, 80 yards, 1:03.
- PV – Jyzaiah Rockwell 39-yard pass from Cameron Peters (kick failed), 0:00. Panthers 13–5. Drive: 5 plays, 98 yards, 0:33.

Third quarter

- PV – Jyzaiah Rockwell 27-yard pass from Cameron Peters (Diego Alfaro kick), 11:48. Panthers 20–5. Drive: 7 plays, 71 yards, 3:05.
- PV – Jyzaiah Rockwell 9-yard pass from Cameron Peters (Diego Alfaro kick), 1:16. Panthers 27–5. Drive: 11 plays, 80 yards, 4:09.

Fourth quarter

- PV – Andre Dennis 18-yard run (Diego Alfaro kick), 13:39. Panthers 34–5. Drive: 3 plays, 64 yards, 1:14.
- PV – Chaney Fitzgerald 56-yard pass from Cameron Peters (Diego Alfaro kick), 12:20. Panthers 41–5. Drive: 1 play, 61 yards, 0:40.
- PV – Shadrick Byrd 1-yard run (Diego Alfaro kick), 3:26. Panthers 48–5. Drive: 9 plays, 83 yards, 6:11.

Statistics	PV	AAMU
First downs	27	15
Total yards	607	204
Rushing yards	213	103
Passing yards	394	101
Passing: Comp–Att–Int	17–23–1	18–39–0
Turnovers	1	0
Time of possession	26:55	33:05

Team	Category	Player	Statistics
Prairie View A&M	Passing	Cameron Peters	17/22, 394 yards, 5 TD
Prairie View A&M	Rushing	Shadrick Byrd	11 rushes, 75 yards, TD
Prairie View A&M	Receiving	Jyzaiah Rockwell	8 receptions, 183 yards, 3 TD
Alabama A&M	Passing	Eric Handley	18/36, 101 yards
Alabama A&M	Rushing	Isaiah Nwokenkwo	5 rushes, 62 yards
Alabama A&M	Receiving	Elijah Lucky	2 receptions, 21 yards

=== Arkansas–Pine Bluff ===
Arkansas–Pine Bluff Golden Lions (3–6) at Prairie View A&M Panthers (7–3) – Game summary

Quarter	1	2	3	4	Total
Golden Lions	0	3	6	0	9
Panthers	7	21	7	21	56

at Panther Stadium • Prairie View, Texas

- Date: November 15
- Game time: 2:00 p.m. CST
- Game weather: Sunny
- Game attendance: 7,069
- Referee: Anton G.
- TV announcers (SWAC TV): Jay Holloway (play by play) and Ossie Clark (analyst)
- Box score, Recap

Game information
First quarter
- PV – Lamagea McDowell 13-yard run (Diego Alfaro kick), 6:07. Panthers 7–0. Drive: 7 plays, 70 yards, 2:52.

Second quarter

- PV – Lamagea McDowell 2-yard run (Diego Alfaro kick), 14:52. Panthers 14–0. Drive: 11 plays, 68 yards, 4:28.
- PV – Andre Dennis 10-yard pass from Cameron Peters (Diego Alfaro kick), 9:17. Panthers 21–0. Drive: 7 plays, 75 yards, 3:23.
- UAPB – Trey Glymph 27-yard field goal, 3:44. Panthers 21–3. Drive: 12 plays, 55 yards, 5:26.
- PV – Andre Dennis 6-yard pass from Cameron Peters (Diego Alfaro kick), 0:37. Panthers 28–3. Drive: 7 plays, 75 yards, 3:07.

Third quarter

- UAPB – Jaylen Jennings 56-yard run (pass failed), 14:22. Panthers 28–9. Drive: 2 plays, 71 yards, 0:32.
- PV – Chase Bingmon 6-yard run (Diego Alfaro kick), 13:17. Panthers 35–9. Drive: 3 plays, 43 yards, 0:53.

Fourth quarter

- PV – Chase Bingmon 74-yard run (Diego Alfaro kick), 14:48. Panthers 42–9. Drive: 3 plays, 85 yards, 1:14.
- PV – Kheagian Heckaman 22-yard pass from Tevin Carter (Diego Alfaro kick), 12:19. Panthers 49–9. Drive: 2 plays, 45 yards, 0:55.
- PV – Cameron Bonner 65-yard pass from Tevin Carter (Diego Alfaro kick), 4:42. Panthers 56–9. Drive: 7 plays, 89 yards, 4:55.

Statistics	UAPB	PV
First downs	10	30
Total yards	253	644
Rushing yards	173	288
Passing yards	80	356
Passing: Comp–Att–Int	9–16–1	22–26–0
Turnovers	1	0
Time of possession	28:32	31:28

Team	Category	Player	Statistics
Arkansas–Pine Bluff	Passing	D. J. Stevenson	8/15, 78 yards, INT
Arkansas–Pine Bluff	Rushing	Jaylen Jennings	20 rushes, 114 yards, TD
Arkansas–Pine Bluff	Receiving	Jordan Jackson	2 receptions, 37 yards
Prairie View A&M	Passing	Cameron Peters	20/24, 269 yards, 2 TD
Prairie View A&M	Rushing	Chase Bingmon	15 rushes, 135 yards, 2 TD
Prairie View A&M	Receiving	Jyzaiah Rockwell	5 receptions, 67 yards

=== Mississippi Valley State ===
Mississippi Valley State Delta Devils (1–9) at Prairie View A&M Panthers (8–3) – Game summary

Quarter	1	2	3	4	Total
Delta Devils	0	0	6	0	6
Panthers	14	21	21	3	59

at Panther Stadium • Prairie View, Texas

- Date: November 22
- Game time: 3:00 p.m. CST
- Game weather: Sunny
- Game attendance: 4,688
- Referee: Jarvis Walker
- TV announcers (SWAC TV): Butch Alsandor (play by play) and Jorge Vargas (analyst)
- Box score, Recap

Game information
First quarter
- PV – Travon Jones 5-yard pass from Cameron Peters (Diego Alfaro kick), 10:08. 'Panthers 7–0. Drive: 5 plays, 55 yards, 2:20.
- PV – Chase Bingmon 1-yard run (Diego Alfaro kick), 3:52. Panthers 14–0. Drive: 2 plays, 11 yards, 0:13.

Second quarter

- PV – Chase Bingmon 25-yard run (Diego Alfaro kick), 10:15. Panthers 21–0. Drive: 3 plays, 48 yards, 0:40.
- PV – Cameron Peters 7-yard run (Diego Alfaro kick), 6:35. Panthers 28–0. Drive: 5 plays, 71 yards, 1:42.
- PV – Travor Randle 33-yard interception return (Diego Alfaro kick), 3:48. Panthers 35–0.

Third quarter

- PV – Jyzaiah Rockwell 31-yard pass from Cameron Peters (Diego Alfaro kick), 13:27. Panthers 42–0. Drive: 3 plays, 87 yards, 1:18.
- PV – Lamagea McDowell 6-yard run (Diego Alfaro kick), 9:33. Panthers 49–0. Drive: 4 plays, 38 yards, 1:35.
- PV – Andre Dennis 51-yard run (Carlos Villagomez kick), 7:41. Panthers 56–0. Drive: 1 play, 51 yards, 0:14.
- MVSU – Adonis Jackson 3-yard blocked punt return (kick blocked), 2:49. Panthers 56–6.

Fourth quarter

- PV – Carlos Villagomez 32-yard field goal, 10:39. Panthers 59–6. Drive: 13 plays, 57 yards, 7:10.

Statistics	MVSU	PV
First downs	8	22
Total yards	142	500
Rushing yards	62	234
Passing yards	80	266
Passing: Comp–Att–Int	9–20–1	15–23–1
Turnovers	2	1
Time of possession	31:56	28:04

Team	Category	Player	Statistics
Mississippi Valley State	Passing	Brandon Nunez	9/18, 80 yards, INT
Mississippi Valley State	Rushing	Malik Kemp	13 rushes, 21 yards
Mississippi Valley State	Receiving	Cameron Nelson	2 receptions, 35 yards
Prairie View A&M	Passing	Cameron Peters	12/16, 234 yards, 2 TD, INT
Prairie View A&M	Rushing	Chase Bingmon	8 rushes, 71 yards, 2 TD
Prairie View A&M	Receiving	Jyzaiah Rockwell	4 receptions, 100 yards, TD

=== At No. 20 Jackson State (SWAC Championship Game) ===
2025 SWAC Championship Game
Prairie View A&M Panthers (9–3) at No. 20 Jackson State Tigers (9–2) – Game summary

Quarter	1	2	3	4	Total
Panthers	7	6	10	0	23
No. 20 Tigers	0	7	14	0	21

at Mississippi Veterans Memorial Stadium, Jackson, Mississippi

- Date: December 6
- Game time: 1:00 p.m. CST
- Game weather: Sunny, 51 °F (11 °C)
- Game attendance: 32,187
- Referee: Y. N. Myers
- TV announcers (ESPN2): Tiffany Greene (play by play), Jay Walker (analyst) and Madison Hock (sideline reporter)
- Box score, Recap

Game information
First quarter
- PV – Cameron Peters 7-yard run (Diego Alfaro kick), 4:22. Panthers 7–0. Drive: 6 plays, 49 yards, 1:44.

Second quarter

- JKST – JaCobian Morgan 29-yard run (Gerardo Baeza kick), 11:20. Tied 7–7. Drive: 10 plays, 91 yards, 4:16.
- PV – Diego Alfaro 19-yard field goal, 7:20. Panthers 10–7. Drive: 7 plays, 26 yards, 3:52.
- PV – Diego Alfaro 30-yard field goal, 0:07. Panthers 13–7. Drive: 4 plays, 3 yards, 0:18.

Third quarter

- PV – Diego Alfaro 42-yard field goal, 11:03. Panthers 16–7. Drive: 8 plays, 55 yards, 3:51.
- JKST – Ja'Naylon Dupree 22-yard pass from Jared Lockhart (Gerardo Baeza kick), 5:09. Panthers 16–14. Drive: 4 plays, 44 yards, 1:58.
- PV – Cameron Bonner 40-yard pass from Cameron Peters (Diego Alfaro kick), 3:21. Panthers 23–14. Drive: 6 plays, 75 yards, 1:41.

Fourth quarter

- JKST – Ahmad Miller 2-yard run (Gerardo Baeza kick), 1:37. Panthers 23–21. Drive: 4 plays, 79 yards, 1:38.

Statistics	PV	JKST
First downs	19	10
Total yards	424	244
Rushing yards	130	84
Passing yards	294	160
Passing: Comp–Att–Int	17–29–1	8–15–1
Turnovers	3	1
Time of possession	38:56	21:04

Team	Category	Player	Statistics
Prairie View A&M	Passing	Cameron Peters	17/28, 294 yards, TD, INT
Prairie View A&M	Rushing	Cameron Peters	24 rushes, 100 yards, TD
Prairie View A&M	Receiving	Jyzaiah Rockwell	4 receptions, 96 yards
Jackson State	Passing	Jared Lockhart	6/9, 156 yards, TD, INT
Jackson State	Rushing	Travis Terrell Jr.	9 rushes, 34 yards
Jackson State	Receiving	Nate Rembert	4 receptions, 80 yards

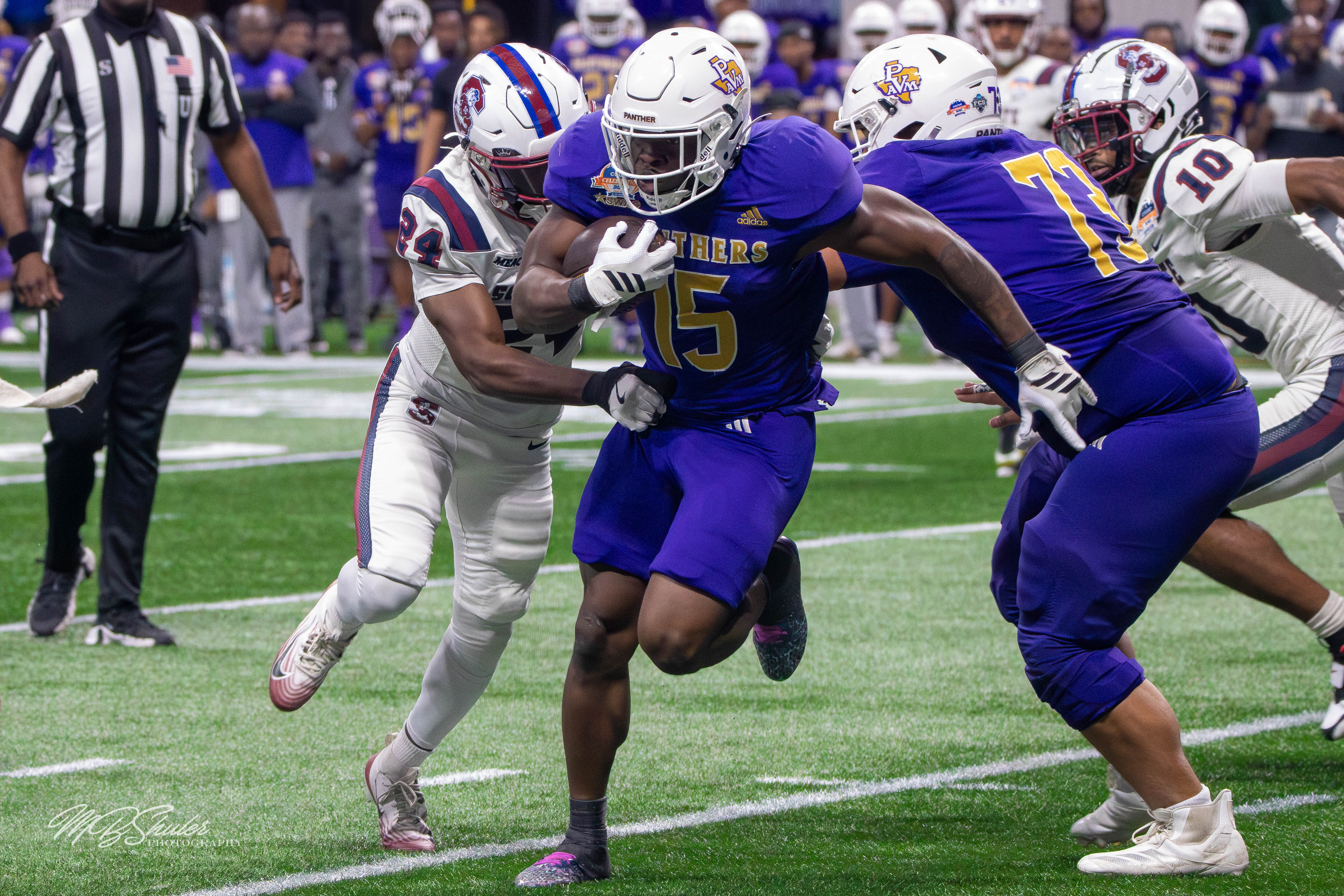
PVAMU Celebration Bowl 2025

=== Vs. South Carolina State (Celebration Bowl) ===
2025 Cricket Celebration Bowl
South Carolina State Bulldogs (9–3) vs. Prairie View A&M Panthers (10–3) – Game summary

Quarter	1	2	3	4	OT	2OT	3OT	4OT	Total
Bulldogs	0	0	21	14	3	0	0	2	40
Panthers	7	14	7	7	3	0	0	0	38

at Mercedes-Benz Stadium, Atlanta, Georgia

- Date: December 13
- Game time: 11:00 a.m. CST/12:00 p.m. EST
- Game weather: Sunny (retractable roof open)
- Game attendance: 26,703
- Referee: Scott Broadway
- TV announcers (ABC): Tiffany Greene, Jay Walker, Harry Lyles Jr., and Quint Kessenich
- Box score, Recap

Game information
First quarter
- PV – Ethan John 16-yard pass from Cameron Peters (Diego Alfaro kick), 1:02. Panthers 7–0. Drive: 6 plays, 69 yards, 2:17.

Second quarter

- PV – Cameron Peters 27-yard run (Diego Alfaro kick), 10:30. Panthers 14–0. Drive: 5 plays, 85 yards, 1:53.
- PV – Jyzaiah Rockwell 14-yard pass from Cameron Peters (Diego Alfaro kick), 1:05. Panthers 21–0. Drive: 11 plays, 95 yards, 4:32.

Third quarter

- SCST – Tyler Smith 5-yard run (Nico Cavanillas Alti kick), 11:19. Panthers 21–7. Drive: 1 play, 5 yards, 0:06.
- SCST – Jordan Smith 10-yard run (Nico Cavanillas Alti kick), 8:34. Panthers 21–14. Drive: 2 plays, 52 yards, 0:43.
- SCST – Jordan Smith 19-yard pass from Ryan Stubblefield (Nico Cavanillas Alti kick), 5:05. Tied 21–21. Drive: 4 plays, 49 yards, 2:07.
- PV – Andre Dennis 13-yard pass from Cameron Peters (Diego Alfaro kick), 2:38. Panthers 28–21. Drive: 6 plays, 75 yards, 2:27.

Fourth quarter

- SCST – Ryan Subblefield (Nico Cavanillas Alti kick), 10:44. Tied 28–28. Drive: 12 plays, 75 yards, 6:54.
- PV – Cameron Bonner 78-yard pass from Cameron Peters (Diego Alfaro kick), 9:53. Panthers 35–28. Drive: 2 plays, 75 yards, 0:51.
- SCST – Jordan Smith 10-yard pass from Ryan Subblefield (Nico Cavanillas Alti kick), 1:54. Tied 35–35. Drive: 13 plays, 62 yards, 5:14.

Overtime

- PV – Diego Alfaro 29-yard field goal. Panthers 38–35. Drive: 4 plays, 6 yards.
- SCST – Nico Cavanillas Alti 40-yard field goal. Tied 38–38. Drive: 4 plays, -5 yards.

2nd overtime

- No scoring plays

3rd overtime

- No scoring plays

4th overtime

- SCST – Ryan Subblefield two-point pass to Tyler Smith. Bulldogs 40–38.

Statistics	SCST	PV
First downs	22	21
Total yards	357	491
Rushing yards	78	55
Passing yards	279	436
Passing: Comp–Att–Int	22–39–1	25–37–0
Turnovers	1	1
Time of possession	34:15	25:45

Team	Category	Player	Statistics
South Carolina State	Passing	Ryan Stubblefield	15/29, 234 yards, 2 TD, INT
South Carolina State	Rushing	Jordan Smith	5 rushes, 28 yards, TD
South Carolina State	Receiving	Jordan Smith	9 receptions, 152 yards, 2 TD
Prairie View A&M	Passing	Cameron Peters	24/36, 412 yards, 4 TD
Prairie View A&M	Rushing	Cameron Peters	9 rushes, 35 yards, TD
Prairie View A&M	Receiving	Andre Dennis	7 receptions, 131 yards, TD
