= 2025 Mississippi Valley State Delta Devils football team =

American college football season

2025 Mississippi Valley State Delta Devils football
- Conference: Southwestern Athletic Conference
- East Division
- Record: 2–10 (1–7 SWAC)
- Head coach: Terrell Buckley (1st season)
- Offensive coordinator: Sam Parker (1st season)
- Defensive coordinator: Kyle Williams (1st season)
- Home stadium: Rice–Totten Stadium

2025 Southwestern Athletic Conference football standings
	Conf.			Overall
Team	W		L	W		L
East Division
Jackson State xy	7	–	1	9	–	3
Alabama State x	7	–	1	10	–	2
Bethune–Cookman	5	–	3	6	–	6
Florida A&M	4	–	4	5	–	7
Alabama A&M	1	–	7	4	–	8
Mississippi Valley State*	1	–	7	2	–	10
West Division
Prairie View A&M xy$	7	–	1	10	–	4
Texas Southern	5	–	3	6	–	5
Alcorn State	4	–	4	5	–	7
Grambling State	4	–	4	7	–	5
Arkansas–Pine Bluff*	2	–	6	4	–	8
Southern	1	–	7	2	–	10
Championship: Prairie View A&M 23, Jackson State 21
$ – Conference champion; x – Division champion/co-champions; y – Championship game participant; * – Ineligible for FCS postseason play due to failed academic requirements; Rankings from STATS Poll

The 2025 Mississippi Valley State Delta Devils football team represented Mississippi Valley State University as a member of the Southwestern Athletic Conference (SWAC) during the 2025 NCAA Division I FCS football season. The Delta Devils were led by first-year head coach Terrell Buckley and played at Rice–Totten Stadium in Itta Bena, Mississippi.

Mississippi Valley State was ineligible for postseason play due to an insufficient Academic Progress Rate.

== Offseason ==
=== Transfers ===
==== Outgoing ====
Player	Position	Destination
Detrick Jones	DL	Alabama State
Bruce Mitchell	S	Eastern Illinois
Trent Sims	LS	FIU
Alexander Davis	P	Florida A&M
Jaydyn Sisk	QB	Garden City
Donovan Parham	DE	Idaho
Nate Rembert	WR	Jackson State
Ty'Jarian Williams	QB	Murray State
Misan Sisk	OL	UT Martin
Vito Moriana-Sigel	OL	Western Carolina
Jaxson Davis	TE	Unknown
Remiello Thomas	TE	Unknown
Emmanuel Arinze	DE	Unknown
Jordan Montgomery	DB	Unknown
Charlie Williams	DB	Unknown

==== Incoming ====
Player	Position	Previous school
Isaiah Atchison	WR	Central Michigan
Isaiah Pedack	DL	Incarnate Word
Brandon Nunez	QB	New Mexico State
Dakarai Cabell	DB	Robert Morris
Kyree Langley	DB	Southeastern Louisiana
Dante Kelly	LB	Southern Miss

== Schedule ==
Date	Time	Opponent	Site	TV	Result	Attendance
August 30	4:00 p.m.	Southern (Note: The game against Southern, a fellow member of the SWAC, is a non-conference game and does not count in the league standings.)*	Rice–Totten Stadium; Itta Bena, MS	SWAC TV	L 29–34	3,748
September 6	6:00 p.m.	at No. 5 Tarleton State*	Memorial Stadium; Stephenville, TX	ESPN+	L 3–59	21,330
September 13	6:00 p.m.	at Southeastern Louisiana*	Strawberry Stadium; Hammond, LA	ESPN+	L 3–56	4,286
September 27	4:00 p.m.	Texas Southern	Rice–Totten Stadium; Itta Bena, MS	SWAC TV	L 20–23	3,826
October 11	2:00 p.m.	at Alabama A&M	Louis Crews Stadium; Huntsville, AL	SWAC TV	L 25–45	19,871
October 18	2:00 p.m.	Lincoln (CA)*^{†}	Rice–Totten Stadium; Itta Bena, MS	SWAC TV	W 49–0	2,788
October 25	2:00 p.m.	at Alcorn State	Casem-Spinks Stadium; Lorman, MS	SWAC TV	L 10–32	4,795
November 1	2:00 p.m.	at Bethune–Cookman	Daytona Stadium; Daytona Beach, FL	SWAC TV	L 34–42	4,534
November 8	2:00 p.m.	No. 23 Jackson State	Rice–Totten Stadium; Itta Bena, MS	SWAC TV	L 3–41	8,927
November 15	4:00 p.m.	vs. Alabama State	Ladd–Peebles Stadium; Mobile, AL (Port City Classic)	SWAC TV	L 3–41	6,123
November 22	2:00 p.m.	at Prairie View A&M	Panther Stadium; Prairie View, TX	SWAC TV	L 6–59	4,688
November 29 (Note: Mississippi Valley State's neutral game against Florida A&M was originally scheduled to be played on October 4 at the Mercedes-Benz Stadium in Atlanta, Georgia, but the game was moved to November 29, 2025 and will be played as an home game.)	2:00 p.m.	Florida A&M	Rice–Totten Stadium; Itta Bena, MS	SWAC TV	W 35–31	2,105
*Non-conference game; ^{†}Homecoming; Rankings from STATS Poll released prior to the game; All times are in Central time

== Game summaries ==
=== Southern ===
Southern Jaguars (0-1) vs. Mississippi Valley State Delta Devils (0-0) – Game summary

Quarter	1	2	3	4	Total
Jaguars	3	14	7	10	34
Delta Devils	3	10	9	7	29

at Rice–Totten Stadium • Itta Bena, MS

- Date: August 30
- Game time: 4:00 pm
- TV announcers (SWAC TV): Mo Carter (play-by-play) and Reggie Flood (analyst)

Statistics	SOU	MVSU
First downs	20	14
Total yards	364	296
Rushing yards	212	78
Passing yards	152	218
Passing: Comp–Att–Int	17-30-0	14-33-0
Time of possession	33:28	26:32

Team	Category	Player	Statistics
Southern	Passing	Cam'Ron McCoy	8/17, 82 yards, TD
Southern	Rushing	Jason Gabriel	19 carries, 97 yards, TD
Southern	Receiving	Darren Morris	3 receptions, 49 yards, TD
Mississippi Valley State	Passing	Josh Brown	12/25, 146 yards, 2 TD
Mississippi Valley State	Rushing	Josh Brown	12 carries, 87 yards
Mississippi Valley State	Receiving	Mekhi Morris	1 reception, 73 yards

=== at No. 5 Tarleton State ===
Mississippi Valley State Delta Devils (0-1) vs. No. 5 Tarleton State Texans (2-0) – Game summary

Quarter	1	2	3	4	Total
Delta Devils	0	3	0	0	3
No. 5 Texans	7	24	28	0	59

at Memorial Stadium • Stephenville, TX

- Date: September 6
- Game time: 6:00 pm
- TV announcers (ESPN+): John Liddle (play-by-play), Hek'ma Harrison (analyst) and Kendra Sheehan (sideline)

Statistics	MVSU	TAR
First downs	12	28
Total yards	244	460
Rushing yards	50	153
Passing yards	194	307
Passing: Comp–Att–Int	14-29-3	21-28-0
Time of possession	26:07	29:03

Team	Category	Player	Statistics
Mississippi Valley State	Passing	Josh Brown	10/19, 113 yards, 1 INT
Mississippi Valley State	Rushing	Norman Taylor	4 carries, 13 yards
Mississippi Valley State	Receiving	Joe Williams	1 reception, 64 yards
Tarleton State	Passing	Victor Gabalis	20/27, 295 yards, 5 TD
Tarleton State	Rushing	James Paige	10 carries, 61 yards
Tarleton State	Receiving	Trevon West	6 receptions, 135 yards, TD

=== at Southeastern Louisiana ===
Mississippi Valley State Delta Devils (0-2) vs. Southeastern Louisiana Lions (1-1) – Game summary

Quarter	1	2	3	4	Total
Delta Devils	3	0	0	0	3
Panthers	28	14	14	0	56

at Strawberry Stadium • Hammond, LA

- Date: September 13
- Game time: 6:00 PM CDT
- TV announcers (ESPN+): Logan Loving (play by play) and Lucas Hill (analyst)

Statistics	MVSU	SELA
First downs	9	19
Total yards	164	445
Rushing yards	103	143
Passing yards	61	302
Passing: Comp–Att–Int	11-16-1	16-20-0
Time of possession	30:50	29:10

Team	Category	Player	Statistics
Mississippi Valley State	Passing	Josh Brown	10/14, 62 yards, INT
Mississippi Valley State	Rushing	Norman Taylor	6 carries, 54 yards
Mississippi Valley State	Receiving	Cameron Nelson	2 receptions, 26 yards
Southeastern Louisiana	Passing	Kyle Lowe	8/8, 155 yards, 3 TD
Southeastern Louisiana	Rushing	Calvin Smith, Jr.	14 carries, 69 yards
Southeastern Louisiana	Receiving	Jaylon Domingeaux	4 receptions, 82 yards, 3 TD

=== Texas Southern ===
Texas Southern Tigers (0-3) vs. Mississippi Valley State Delta Devils (0-3) – Game summary

Quarter	1	2	3	4	Total
Tigers	0	7	7	9	23
Delta Devils	10	7	3	0	20

at Rice–Totten Stadium • Itta Bena, MS

- Date: September 27
- Game time: 4:00 p.m. CDT
- TV announcers (SWAC TV): Charles Bishop (play-by-play) and Charles Porter (analyst)

Statistics	TXSO	MVSU
First downs	20	26
Total yards	307	440
Rushing yards	146	193
Passing yards	161	247
Passing: Comp–Att–Int	13-21-0	21-32-0
Time of possession	27:11	29:17

Team	Category	Player	Statistics
Texas Southern	Passing	KJ Cooper	13/20, 151 yards
Texas Southern	Rushing	Athean Renfro	21 carries, 80 yards, 2 TD
Texas Southern	Receiving	Trenton Leary	1 reception, 48 yards
Mississippi Valley State	Passing	Josh Brown	20/31, 252 yards, TD
Mississippi Valley State	Rushing	Josh Brown	19 carries, 91 yards
Mississippi Valley State	Receiving	Evens Valcourt, Jr.	5 receptions, 62 yards

=== at Alabama A&M ===
Mississippi Valley State Delta Devils (0-4) vs. Alabama A&M Bulldogs (3-3) – Game summary

Quarter	1	2	3	4	Total
Delta Devils	9	7	3	6	25
Bulldogs	7	10	21	7	45

at Louis Crews Stadium • Huntsville, AL

- Date: October 11
- Game time: 2:00 p.m. CDT
- TV announcers (SWAC TV): Mo Carter (play by play), Stan Becton (analyst) and Shavonne Herndon (sideline reporter)

Statistics	MVSU	AAMU
First downs	14	29
Total yards	326	494
Rushing yards	153	240
Passing yards	173	254
Passing: Comp–Att–Int	10-20-0	25-33-1
Time of possession	24:55	35:05

Team	Category	Player	Statistics
Mississippi Valley State	Passing	Josh Brown	9/18, 123 yards, TD
Mississippi Valley State	Rushing	Josh Brown	8 carries, 74 yards
Mississippi Valley State	Receiving	Christian White	2 receptions, 75 yards
Alabama A&M	Passing	Eric Handley	24/32, 2 TD, INT
Alabama A&M	Rushing	Kolton Nero	7 carries, 71 yards, TD
Alabama A&M	Receiving	Franck Pierre	4 receptions, 88 yards, TD

=== Lincoln (CA) (Ind) ===
Lincoln Oaklanders (Ind) (0-0) vs. Mississippi Valley State Delta Devils (0-0) – Game summary

Quarter	1	2	3	4	Total
Oaklanders (Ind)	0	0	0	0	0
Delta Devils	14	0	28	7	49

at Rice–Totten Stadium • Itta Bena, MS

- Date: October 18
- Game time: 2:00 PM CDT
- TV announcers (SWAC TV): Jay Holloway (play by play) and Ossie Clark (analyst)

Statistics	LCLN	MVSU
First downs	19	13
Total yards	225	275
Rushing yards	-35	178
Passing yards	260	97
Passing: Comp–Att–Int	27-46-3	4-10-0
Time of possession	38:59	21:01

Team	Category	Player	Statistics
Lincoln (CA)	Passing	Rob Brazziel	21/30, 167 yards, INT
Lincoln (CA)	Rushing	Rodney Washington	5 carries, 10 yards
Lincoln (CA)	Receiving	Seth Maldonado	8 receptions, 88 yards
Mississippi Valley State	Passing	Josh Brown	3/9, 58 yards
Mississippi Valley State	Rushing	Brandon Nunez	6 carries, 70 yards
Mississippi Valley State	Receiving	Cameron Nelson	2 receptions, 53 yards, TD

=== at Alcorn State ===
Mississippi Valley State Delta Devils (1-5) vs. Alcorn State Braves (1-6) – Game summary

Quarter	1	2	3	4	Total
Delta Devils	-	-	-	-	0
Braves	-	-	-	-	0

at Casem-Spinks Stadium • Lorman, MS

- Date: October 25
- TV announcers (SWAC TV): Santoria Black (play by play) and Ken Moore (analyst)

Statistics	MVSU	ALCN
First downs		
Total yards		
Rushing yards		
Passing yards		
Passing: Comp–Att–Int		
Time of possession		

Team	Category	Player	Statistics
Mississippi Valley State	Passing		
Mississippi Valley State	Rushing		
Mississippi Valley State	Receiving		
Alcorn State	Passing		
Alcorn State	Rushing		
Alcorn State	Receiving		

=== at Bethune–Cookman ===
Mississippi Valley State Delta Devils (1-6) vs. Bethune–Cookman Wildcats (4-4) – Game summary

Quarter	1	2	3	4	Total
Delta Devils	-	-	-	-	0
Wildcats	-	-	-	-	0

at Daytona Stadium • Daytona Beach, FL

- Date: November 1
- Game time: 3:00 PM EDT
- TV announcers (SWAC TV): Kenny Schierlinger (play by play) and Davion Belk (analyst)

Statistics	MVSU	BCU
First downs		
Total yards		
Rushing yards		
Passing yards		
Passing: Comp–Att–Int		
Time of possession		

Team	Category	Player	Statistics
Mississippi Valley State	Passing		
Mississippi Valley State	Rushing		
Mississippi Valley State	Receiving		
Bethune–Cookman	Passing		
Bethune–Cookman	Rushing		
Bethune–Cookman	Receiving		

=== No. 23 Jackson State ===
No. 23 Jackson State Tigers (6-2) vs. Mississippi Valley State Delta Devils (1-7) – Game summary

Quarter	1	2	3	4	Total
No. 23 Tigers	-	-	-	-	0
Delta Devils	-	-	-	-	0

at Rice–Totten Stadium • Itta Bena, MS

- Date: November 8
- Game time: 2:00 PM CST
- TV announcers (SWAC TV): Charles Bishop (play by play) and Charles Porter (analyst)

Statistics	JKST	MVSU
First downs		
Total yards		
Rushing yards		
Passing yards		
Passing: Comp–Att–Int		
Time of possession		

Team	Category	Player	Statistics
Jackson State	Passing		
Jackson State	Rushing		
Jackson State	Receiving		
Mississippi Valley State	Passing		
Mississippi Valley State	Rushing		
Mississippi Valley State	Receiving		

=== vs. Alabama State ===
Alabama State Hornets (0-0) vs. Mississippi Valley State Delta Devils (0-0) – Game summary

Quarter	1	2	3	4	Total
Hornets	-	-	-	-	0
Delta Devils	-	-	-	-	0

at Ladd–Peebles Stadium • Mobile, AL

- Date: November 15
- TV announcers (SWAC TV): Charles Bishop (play by play) and Charles Porter (analyst)

Statistics	ALST	MVSU
First downs		
Total yards		
Rushing yards		
Passing yards		
Passing: Comp–Att–Int		
Time of possession		

Team	Category	Player	Statistics
Alabama State	Passing		
Alabama State	Rushing		
Alabama State	Receiving		
Mississippi Valley State	Passing		
Mississippi Valley State	Rushing		
Mississippi Valley State	Receiving		

=== at Prairie View A&M ===
Mississippi Valley State Delta Devils (0-0) vs. Prairie View A&M Panthers (0-0) – Game summary

Quarter	1	2	3	4	Total
Delta Devils	-	-	-	-	0
Panthers	-	-	-	-	0

at Panther Stadium • Prairie View, TX

- Date: November 22
- Game time: 3:00 PM CST
- TV announcers (SWAC TV): Butch Alsandor (play by play) and Jorge Vargas (analyst)

Statistics	MVSU	PV
First downs		
Total yards		
Rushing yards		
Passing yards		
Passing: Comp–Att–Int		
Time of possession		

Team	Category	Player	Statistics
Mississippi Valley State	Passing		
Mississippi Valley State	Rushing		
Mississippi Valley State	Receiving		
Prairie View A&M	Passing		
Prairie View A&M	Rushing		
Prairie View A&M	Receiving		

=== Florida A&M ===
Florida A&M Rattlers (0-0) vs. Mississippi Valley State Delta Devils (0-0) – Game summary

Quarter	1	2	3	4	Total
Rattlers	-	-	-	-	0
Delta Devils	-	-	-	-	0

at Rice-Totten Stadium • Itta Bena, MS

- Date: November 29
- Game time: 2:00 PM CDT
- TV announcers (SWAC TV): James Verrett (play by play) and Charles Porter (analyst)

Statistics	FAMU	MVSU
First downs		
Total yards		
Rushing yards		
Passing yards		
Passing: Comp–Att–Int		
Time of possession		

Team	Category	Player	Statistics
Florida A&M	Passing		
Florida A&M	Rushing		
Florida A&M	Receiving		
Mississippi Valley State	Passing		
Mississippi Valley State	Rushing		
Mississippi Valley State	Receiving		
