= 2025 Grambling State Tigers football team =

American college football season

2025 Grambling State Tigers football
- Conference: Southwestern Athletic Conference
- West Division
- Record: 7–5 (4–4 SWAC)
- Head coach: Mickey Joseph (2nd season)
- Offensive coordinator: Eric Dooley (2nd, 6th overall season)
- Defensive coordinator: Jason Rollins (2nd season)
- Home stadium: Eddie G. Robinson Memorial Stadium

2025 Southwestern Athletic Conference football standings
	Conf.			Overall
Team	W		L	W		L
East Division
Jackson State xy	7	–	1	9	–	3
Alabama State x	7	–	1	10	–	2
Bethune–Cookman	5	–	3	6	–	6
Florida A&M	4	–	4	5	–	7
Alabama A&M	1	–	7	4	–	8
Mississippi Valley State*	1	–	7	2	–	10
West Division
Prairie View A&M xy$	7	–	1	10	–	4
Texas Southern	5	–	3	6	–	5
Alcorn State	4	–	4	5	–	7
Grambling State	4	–	4	7	–	5
Arkansas–Pine Bluff*	2	–	6	4	–	8
Southern	1	–	7	2	–	10
Championship: Prairie View A&M 23, Jackson State 21
$ – Conference champion; x – Division champion/co-champions; y – Championship game participant; * – Ineligible for FCS postseason play due to failed academic requirements; Rankings from STATS Poll

The 2025 Grambling State Tigers football team represented Grambling State University as a member of the Southwestern Athletic Conference (SWAC) during the 2025 NCAA Division I FCS football season. The Tigers were coached by second-year head coach Mickey Joseph and played at Eddie G. Robinson Memorial Stadium in Grambling, Louisiana.

== Schedule ==
Date	Time	Opponent	Site	TV	Result	Attendance
August 30	7:00 p.m.	vs. Langston*	Independence Stadium; Shreveport, LA (Shreveport Kickoff Classic)	SWAC TV	W 55–7	18,435
September 6	2:30 p.m.	at No. 1 (FBS) Ohio State*	Ohio Stadium; Columbus, OH	BTN	L 0–70	100,624
September 13	6:00 p.m.	Kentucky State*	Eddie Robinson Stadium; Grambling, LA	SWAC TV	W 37–31 ^{OT}	2,500
September 20	6:00 p.m.	East Texas A&M*	Eddie Robinson Stadium; Grambling, LA	SWAC TV	W 31–28	4,210
September 27	6:00 p.m.	vs. Prairie View A&M	Cotton Bowl Stadium; Dallas, TX (State Fair Classic)	SWAC TV	L 13–28	56,210
October 11	6:00 p.m.	Texas Southern^{†}	Eddie Robinson Stadium; Grambling, LA	ESPN+	L 20–21	15,763
October 18	2:00 p.m.	at Arkansas–Pine Bluff	Simmons Bank Field; Pine Bluff, AR	SWAC TV	W 20–16	6,257
October 25	5:00 p.m.	vs. No. 12 Jackson State	Allegiant Stadium; Las Vegas, NV (Las Vegas HBCU Classic)	HBCU Go	W 26–24	29,655
November 1	2:00 p.m.	Alabama A&M	Eddie Robinson Stadium; Grambling, LA	SWAC TV	W 13–10	8,776
November 8	2:00 p.m.	Bethune–Cookman	Eddie Robinson Stadium; Grambling, LA	SWAC TV	W 31–23	6,237
November 15	2:00 p.m.	at Alcorn State	Casem-Spinks Stadium; Lorman, MS	SWAC TV	L 16–27	7,845
November 29	1:00 p.m.	vs. Southern	Caesars Superdome; New Orleans, LA (Bayou Classic)	NBC/Peacock	L 27–28	63,000
*Non-conference game; ^{†}Homecoming; Rankings from STATS Poll released prior to the game; All times are in Central time

== Game summaries ==
=== vs. Langston (NAIA) ===
Langston Lions (NAIA) (0-0) at Grambling State Tigers (0-0) – Game summary

Quarter	1	2	3	4	Total
Lions (NAIA)	0	0	0	7	7
Tigers	14	21	13	7	55

at Independence Stadium • Shreveport, LA

- Date: August 30
- Game time: 7:00 PM CDT
- Game weather: Cloudy • Temperature: 81 °F (27 °C)
- Game attendance: 11,000
- Referee: Jarvis Walker
- TV announcers (SWAC TV): Santoria Black (play-by-play) and Ken Moore (analyst)

Game information

First Quarter

- (5:51) GRAM – Andrew Crews 6-yard run, Theodore Caballero kick (Drive: 8 plays, 61 yards, 3:43; Grambling State 7–0)
- (2:30) GRAM – Tyson George 55-yard pass from Czavian Teasett, Theodore Caballero kick (Drive: 3 plays, 55 yards, 1:26; Grambling State 14–0)

Second Quarter

- (10:15) GRAM – Byron Eaton Jr. 1-yard run, Theodore Caballero kick (Drive: 2 plays, 1 yard, 0:32; Grambling State 21–0)
- (4:07) GRAM – Tre Bradford 38-yard run, Theodore Caballero kick (Drive: 2 plays, 43 yards, 0:46; Grambling State 28–0)
- (1:56) GRAM – Covadis Knighten 3-yard pass from Czavian Teasett, Theodore Caballero kick (Drive: 4 plays, 28 yards, 2:03; Grambling State 35–0)

Third Quarter

- (8:34) GRAM – Barron Miles Jr. 3-yard pass from Czavian Teasett, Theodore Caballero kick (Drive: 11 plays, 75 yards, 6:19; Grambling State 42–0)
- (3:25) GRAM – Andrew Frazier 11-yard pass from Ashton Frye (Drive: 5 plays, 32 yards, 2:48; Grambling State 48–0)

Fourth Quarter

- (12:54) GRAM – Tony Phillips 11-yard run, Josh McCormick kick (Drive: 7 plays, 57 yards, 3:44; Grambling State 55–0)
- (9:22) LAN – Dylan Wrobleski 21-yard pass from Aden Hooper, Octavio Resendiz kick (Drive: 9 plays, 75 yards, 3:32; Grambling State 55–7)

Statistics	LAN	GRAM
First downs	6	25
Total yards	97	474
Rushing yards	-32	220
Passing yards	129	254
Passing: Comp–Att–Int	14–32–1	26–33–0
Time of possession	22:56	37:04

Team	Category	Player	Statistics
Langston	Passing	Aden Hooper	8/15, 83 yards, TD
Langston	Rushing	True Booker	7 carries
Langston	Receiving	Dylan Wrobleski	9 receptions, 104 yards, TD
Grambling State	Passing	Czavian Teasett	20/25, 210 yards, 3 TD
Grambling State	Rushing	Tre Bradford	6 carries, 56 yards, TD
Grambling State	Receiving	Tyson George	3 receptions, 63 yards, TD

=== at No. 1 (FBS) Ohio State ===
Grambling State Tigers (1-0) at No. 1 (FBS) Ohio State Buckeyes (1-0) – Game summary

Quarter	1	2	3	4	Total
Tigers	0	0	0	0	0
No. 1 (FBS) Buckeyes	21	14	21	14	70

at Ohio Stadium • Columbus, OH

- Date: September 6
- Game time: 2:30 PM CDT
- Game weather: Cloudy • Temperature: 69 °F (21 °C) • Wind: W at 8 miles per hour (13 km/h)
- Game attendance: 100,624
- Referee: Andrew Speciale
- TV announcers (BTN): Jeff Levering (play-by-play), Jake Butt (analyst), and Brooke Fletcher (sideline reporter)

Game information

First Quarter

- (12:39) OSU – Will Kacmarek 47-yard pass from Julian Sayin, Jayden Fielding kick (Drive: 6 plays, 83 yards, 2:16; Ohio State 7–0)
- (8:54) OSU – Jeremiah Smith 87-yard pass from Julian Sayin, Jayden Fielding kick (Drive: 1 play, 87 yards, 0:12; Ohio State 14–0)
- (4:10) OSU – Carnell Tate 13-yard pass from Julian Sayin, Jayden Fielding kick (Drive: 7 plays, 65 yards, 3:19; Ohio State 21–0)

Second Quarter

- (11:38) OSU – Jeremiah Smith 9-yard pass from Julian Sayin, Jayden Fielding kick (Drive: 6 plays, 80 yards, 2:46; Ohio State 28–0)
- (0:57) OSU – CJ Donaldson Jr. 2-yard run, Jayden Fielding kick (Drive: 8 plays, 62 yards, 3:19; Ohio State 35–0)

Third Quarter

- (14:50) OSU – Riley Pettijohn 23-yard fumble recovery, Jayden Fielding kick (Ohio State 42–0)
- (8:24) OSU – Bo Jackson 11-yard run, Jackson Courville kick (Drive: 9 plays, 76 yards, 3:40; Ohio State 49–0)
- (6:16) OSU – Isaiah West 12-yard run, Jackson Courville kick (Drive: 3 plays, 41 yards, 1:15; Ohio State 56–0)

Fourth Quarter

- (14:55) OSU – Jelani Thurman 4-yard pass from Lincoln Kienholz, Jackson Courville kick (Drive: 8 plays, 53 yards, 4:24; Ohio State 63–0)
- (0:31) OSU – Sam Dixon 1-yard run, Jackson Courville kick (Drive: 9 plays, 84 yards, 4:46; Ohio State 70–0)

Statistics	GRAM	OSU
First downs	10	32
Plays–yards	55–166	66–651
Rushes–yards	33–94	38–274
Passing yards	72	377
Passing: comp–att–int	11–22–1	24–28–1
Turnovers	3	1
Time of possession	29:05	30:55

Team	Category	Player	Statistics
Grambling State	Passing	C'zavian Teasett	9/15, 55 yards, INT
Grambling State	Rushing	Andre Crews	5 carries, 38 yards
Grambling State	Receiving	Keith Jones Jr.	2 receptions, 19 yards
Ohio State	Passing	Julian Sayin	18/19, 306 yards, 4 TD, INT
Ohio State	Rushing	Bo Jackson	9 carries, 108 yards, TD
Ohio State	Receiving	Jeremiah Smith	5 receptions, 119 yards, 2 TD

=== Kentucky State (DII) ===
Kentucky State Thorobreds (DII) (1-1) at Grambling State Tigers (1-1) – Game summary

Quarter	1	2	3	4	OT	Total
Thorobreds (DII)	14	7	0	10	0	31
Tigers	0	17	7	7	6	37

at Eddie Robinson Stadium • Grambling, LA

- Date: September 13
- Game time: 6:00 p.m. CDT
- Game weather: Sunny • Temperature: 88 °F (31 °C) • Wind: SE at 4 miles per hour (6.4 km/h)
- Game attendance: 5,025
- Referee: Jarvis Walker
- TV announcers (SWAC TV): Santoria Black (play-by-play) and Ken Moore (analyst)

Game information

First Quarter

- (8:23) KYST – Denim Johnson 3-yard run, Leland Gantz kick (Drive: 9 plays, 69 yards, 5:18; Kentucky State 7–0)
- (2:21) KYST – Chad Elzy 6-yard run, Leland Gantz kick (Drive: 8 plays, 60 yards, 4:27; Kentucky State 14–0)

Second Quarter

- (12:18) GRAM – Josh McCormick 23-yard field goal (Drive: 12 plays, 66 yards, 4:57; Kentucky State 14–3)
- (8:39) GRAM – Keith Jones Jr. 12-yard pass from C'zavian Teasett, Josh McCormick kick (Drive: 4 plays, 55 yards, 1:15; Kentucky State 14–10)
- (2:13) KYST – Jon McCall 11-yard pass from Denim Johnson, Leland Gantz kick (Drive: 11 plays, 75 yards, 6:26; Kentucky State 21–10)
- (1:12) GRAM – C'zavian Teasett 13-yard run, Josh McCormick kick (Drive: 5 plays, 75 yards, 1:01; Kentucky State 21–17)

Third Quarter

- (3:51) GRAM – Keith Jones Jr. 36-yard pass from C'zavian Teasett, Josh McCormick kick (Drive: 10 plays, 80 yards, 5:32; Grambling State 24–21)

Fourth Quarter

- (7:18) KYST – Darius Cyprian 33-yard pass from Torrence Bardell, Leland Gantz kick (Drive: 1 play, 33 yards, 0:07; Kentucky State 28–24)
- (1:55) KYST – Leland Gantz 43-yard field goal (Drive: 9 plays, 45 yards, 5:22; Kentucky State 31–24)
- (0:10) GRAM – C'zavian Teasett 17-yard run, Josh McCormick kick (Drive: 8 plays, 75 yards, 1:39; Tied 31–31)

Overtime

- GRAM – Tyrell Raby 83-yard fumble recovery (Grambling State 37–31)

Statistics	KYST	GRAM
First downs	18	23
Total yards	356	458
Rushing yards	135	230
Passing yards	221	228
Passing: Comp–Att–Int	20–30–0	13–27–0
Time of possession	32:55	27:05

Team	Category	Player	Statistics
Kentucky State	Passing	Denim Johnson	15/24, 146 yards, TD
Kentucky State	Rushing	Jaylen Middleton	14 carries, 65 yards
Kentucky State	Receiving	Jon McCall	8 receptions, 81 yards, TD
Grambling State	Passing	C'zavian Teasett	13/27, 228 yards, 2 TD
Grambling State	Rushing	C'zavian Teasett	9 carries, 99 yards, 2 TD
Grambling State	Receiving	Keith Jones Jr.	3 receptions, 96 yards, 2 TD

=== East Texas A&M ===
East Texas A&M Lions (0-2) vs. Grambling State Tigers (2-1) – Game summary

Quarter	1	2	3	4	Total
Lions	0	14	7	7	28
Tigers	0	7	14	10	31

at Eddie Robinson Stadium • Grambling, LA

- Date: September 20
- Game time: 6:00 p.m.
- Game weather: Sunny • Temperature: 86 °F (30 °C) • Wind: S at 5 miles per hour (8.0 km/h)
- Game attendance: 4,210
- Referee: Charles Green
- TV announcers (SWAC TV): Butch Alsandor (play by play) and Jorge Vargas (analyst)

Game information

First Quarter

No scoring plays

Second Quarter

- (6:12) ETAM – EJ Oakmon 7-yard run, Ozlo Rigby kick (Drive: 9 plays, 78 yards, 4:24; East Texas A&M 7–0)
- (2:25) ETAM – Brycen Davis 3-yard pass from Eric Rodriguez, Ozlo Rigby kick (Drive: 6 plays, 27 yards, 2:48; East Texas A&M 14–0)
- (0:59) GRAM – Covadis Knighten 11-yard pass from C'zavian Teasett, Theodore Caballero kick (Drive: 3 plays, 37 yards, 0:26; East Texas A&M 14–7)

Third Quarter

- (11:10) GRAM – C'zavian Teasett 1-yard run, Theodore Caballero kick (Drive: 4 plays, 1 yard, 1:42; Tied 14–14)
- (7:38) ETAM – Jaden Proctor 26-yard pass from Eric Rodriguez, Ozlo Rigby kick (Drive: 6 plays, 65 yards, 3:32; East Texas A&M 21–14)
- (5:50) GRAM – Byron Eaton Jr. 54-yard run, Theodore Caballero kick (Drive: 4 plays, 68 yards, 1:41; Tied 21–21)

Fourth Quarter

- (13:04) ETAM – JaiSean McMillian 6-yard run, Ozlo Rigby kick (Drive: 10 plays, 86 yards, 5:17; East Texas A&M 28–21)
- (10:54) GRAM – Theodore Caballero 41-yard field goal (Drive: 6 plays, 51 yards, 2:10; East Texas A&M 28–24)
- (1:56) GRAM – Clyde McClendon Jr. 1-yard run, Theodore Caballero kick (Drive: 12 plays, 77 yards, 6:01; Grambling State 31–28)

Statistics	ETAM	GRAM
First downs	23	15
Total yards	352	321
Rushing yards	123	142
Passing yards	229	179
Passing: Comp–Att–Int	23–33–1	14–26–0
Time of possession	36:29	23:31

Team	Category	Player	Statistics
East Texas A&M	Passing	Eric Rodriguez	23/33, 229 yards, 2 TD, INT
East Texas A&M	Rushing	KJ Shankle	13 carries, 51 yards
East Texas A&M	Receiving	Tyler Daniels	3 receptions, 51 yards
Grambling State	Passing	C'zavian Teasett	14/26, 179 yards, TD
Grambling State	Rushing	Byron Eaton Jr.	6 carries, 69 yards, TD
Grambling State	Receiving	Tyson George	3 receptions, 59 yards

=== vs. Prairie View A&M (State Fair Classic) ===
Grambling State Tigers (3-1) vs. Prairie View A&M Panthers (2-2) – Game summary

Quarter	1	2	3	4	Total
Tigers	3	3	0	7	13
Panthers	7	7	7	7	28

at Cotton Bowl • Dallas, TX

- Date: September 27
- TV announcers (SWAC TV): Butch Alsandor (play by play) and Jorge Vargas (analyst)

Statistics	GRAM	PV
First downs		
Total yards		
Rushing yards		
Passing yards		
Passing: Comp–Att–Int		
Time of possession		

Team	Category	Player	Statistics
Grambling State	Passing		
Grambling State	Rushing		
Grambling State	Receiving		
Prairie View A&M	Passing		
Prairie View A&M	Rushing		
Prairie View A&M	Receiving		

=== Texas Southern ===
Texas Southern Tigers (2-3) vs. Grambling State Tigers (3-2) – Game summary

Quarter	1	2	3	4	Total
Texas Southern	-	-	-	-	0
Grambling State	-	-	-	-	0

at Eddie Robinson Stadium • Grambling, LA

- Date: October 11
- Game time: 6:00 PM CDT
- TV announcers (ESPN+): Jason Ross Jr. (play by play) and Tyoka Jackson (analyst)

Statistics	TXSO	GRAM
First downs		
Total yards		
Rushing yards		
Passing yards		
Passing: Comp–Att–Int		
Time of possession		

Team	Category	Player	Statistics
Texas Southern	Passing		
Texas Southern	Rushing		
Texas Southern	Receiving		
Grambling State	Passing		
Grambling State	Rushing		
Grambling State	Receiving		

=== at Arkansas–Pine Bluff ===
Grambling State Tigers (0-0) vs. Arkansas–Pine Bluff Golden Lions (0-0) – Game summary

Quarter	1	2	3	4	Total
Tigers	-	-	-	-	0
Golden Lions	-	-	-	-	0

at Simmons Bank Field • Pine Bluff, AR

- Date: October 18
- Game time: 2:00 PM CDT
- TV announcers (SWAC TV): LaRon Marbley (play by play) and Carlos James (analyst)

Statistics	GRAM	UAPB
First downs		
Total yards		
Rushing yards		
Passing yards		
Passing: Comp–Att–Int		
Time of possession		

Team	Category	Player	Statistics
Grambling State	Passing		
Grambling State	Rushing		
Grambling State	Receiving		
Arkansas–Pine Bluff	Passing		
Arkansas–Pine Bluff	Rushing		
Arkansas–Pine Bluff	Receiving		

=== vs. No. 12 Jackson State ===
Grambling State Tigers (4-3) vs. No. 12 Jackson State Tigers (5-1) – Game summary

Quarter	1	2	3	4	Total
Grambling State	-	-	-	-	0
No. 12 Jackson State	-	-	-	-	0

at Allegiant Stadium • Paradise, NV

- Date: October 25
- Game time: 3:00 PM PDT
- TV announcers (HBCU Go): James Hadnot (play by play), Jon Kelley (analyst) and Lawrencia Moten (sideline reporter)

Statistics	GRAM	JKST
First downs		
Total yards		
Rushing yards		
Passing yards		
Passing: Comp–Att–Int		
Time of possession		

Team	Category	Player	Statistics
Grambling State	Passing		
Grambling State	Rushing		
Grambling State	Receiving		
Jackson State	Passing		
Jackson State	Rushing		
Jackson State	Receiving		

=== Alabama A&M ===
Alabama A&M Bulldogs (4-4) vs. Grambling State Tigers (4-4) – Game summary

Quarter	1	2	3	4	Total
Bulldogs	-	-	-	-	0
Tigers	-	-	-	-	0

at Eddie Robinson Stadium • Grambling, LA

- Date: November 1
- TV announcers (SWAC TV): Santoria Black (play by play) and Ossie Clark (analyst)

Statistics	AAMU	GRAM
First downs		
Total yards		
Rushing yards		
Passing yards		
Passing: Comp–Att–Int		
Time of possession		

Team	Category	Player	Statistics
Alabama A&M	Passing		
Alabama A&M	Rushing		
Alabama A&M	Receiving		
Grambling State	Passing		
Grambling State	Rushing		
Grambling State	Receiving		

=== Bethune–Cookman ===
Bethune–Cookman Wildcats (5-4) vs. Grambling State Tigers (6-3) – Game summary

Quarter	1	2	3	4	Total
Wildcats	-	-	-	-	0
Tigers	-	-	-	-	0

at Eddie Robinson Stadium • Grambling, LA

- Date: November 8
- TV announcers (SWAC TV): Butch Alsandor (play by play) and Jorge Vargas (analyst)

Statistics	BCU	GRAM
First downs		
Total yards		
Rushing yards		
Passing yards		
Passing: Comp–Att–Int		
Time of possession		

Team	Category	Player	Statistics
Bethune–Cookman	Passing		
Bethune–Cookman	Rushing		
Bethune–Cookman	Receiving		
Grambling State	Passing		
Grambling State	Rushing		
Grambling State	Receiving		

=== at Alcorn State ===
Grambling State Tigers (0-0) vs. Alcorn State Braves (0-0) – Game summary

Quarter	1	2	3	4	Total
Tigers	-	-	-	-	0
Braves	-	-	-	-	0

at Casem-Spinks Stadium • Lorman, MS

- Date: November 15
- TV announcers (ESPN+): Santoria Black (play by play) and Ken Moore (analyst)

Statistics	GRAM	ALCN
First downs		
Total yards		
Rushing yards		
Passing yards		
Passing: Comp–Att–Int		
Time of possession		

Team	Category	Player	Statistics
Grambling State	Passing		
Grambling State	Rushing		
Grambling State	Receiving		
Alcorn State	Passing		
Alcorn State	Rushing		
Alcorn State	Receiving		

=== vs. Southern (Bayou Classic) ===
Grambling State Tigers (0-0) vs. Southern Jaguars (0-0) – Game summary

Quarter	1	2	3	4	Total
Tigers	-	-	-	-	0
Jaguars	-	-	-	-	0

at Caesars Superdome • New Orleans, LA

- Date: November 29
- Game time: 1:00 PM CST
- TV announcers (NBC): Chris Lewis (play by play), Anthony Herron (analyst) and Lewis Johnson (sideline reporter)

Statistics	GRAM	SOU
First downs		
Total yards		
Rushing yards		
Passing yards		
Passing: Comp–Att–Int		
Time of possession		

Team	Category	Player	Statistics
Grambling State	Passing		
Grambling State	Rushing		
Grambling State	Receiving		
Southern	Passing		
Southern	Rushing		
Southern	Receiving		
