= 2025 Jackson State Tigers football team =

American college football season

2025 Jackson State Tigers football

SWAC East Division co-champion

SWAC Championship Game, L 21–23 vs. Prairie View A&M
- Conference: Southwestern Athletic Conference
- West Division

Ranking
- FCS Coaches: No. 22
- Record: 9–3 (7–1 SWAC)
- Head coach: T. C. Taylor (3rd season)
- Co-offensive coordinators: Rip Kirk (1st season); Manny Ramirez (1st season)
- Offensive scheme: Spread
- Defensive coordinator: Aaron Jackson (1st season)
- Base defense: 4–2–5
- Home stadium: Mississippi Veterans Memorial Stadium

2025 Southwestern Athletic Conference football standings
	Conf.			Overall
Team	W		L	W		L
East Division
Jackson State xy	7	–	1	9	–	3
Alabama State x	7	–	1	10	–	2
Bethune–Cookman	5	–	3	6	–	6
Florida A&M	4	–	4	5	–	7
Alabama A&M	1	–	7	4	–	8
Mississippi Valley State*	1	–	7	2	–	10
West Division
Prairie View A&M xy$	7	–	1	10	–	4
Texas Southern	5	–	3	6	–	5
Alcorn State	4	–	4	5	–	7
Grambling State	4	–	4	7	–	5
Arkansas–Pine Bluff*	2	–	6	4	–	8
Southern	1	–	7	2	–	10
Championship: Prairie View A&M 23, Jackson State 21
$ – Conference champion; x – Division champion/co-champions; y – Championship game participant; * – Ineligible for FCS postseason play due to failed academic requirements; Rankings from STATS Poll

The 2025 Jackson State Tigers football team represented Jackson State University as a member of the Southwestern Athletic Conference (SWAC) during the 2025 NCAA Division I FCS football season. The Tigers were led by third-year head coach T. C. Taylor and played at the Mississippi Veterans Memorial Stadium in Jackson, Mississippi.

The Jackson State Tigers drew an average home attendance of 28,733, the highest of all NCAA Division I FCS football teams.

== Schedule ==
Date	Time	Opponent	Rank	Site	TV	Result	Attendance
August 30	2:00 p.m.	Hampton*	No. 17	Mississippi Veterans Memorial Stadium; Jackson, MS	HBCU Go	W 28–14	13,576
September 6	4:00 p.m.	at Southern Miss*	No. 15	M. M. Roberts Stadium; Hattiesburg, MS	ESPN+	L 20–38	32,011
September 13	2:00 p.m.	Tuskegee*	No. 19	Mississippi Veterans Memorial Stadium; Jackson, MS	SWAC TV	W 30–0	18,642
September 27	6:00 p.m.	at Southern	No. 19	A. W. Mumford Stadium; Baton Rouge, LA (rivalry)	ESPN+	W 38–13	27,487
October 4	4:00 p.m.	vs. Alabama A&M	No. 17	Ladd–Peebles Stadium; Mobile, AL	HBCU Go	W 57–24	14,517
October 11	2:30 p.m.	Alabama State	No. 15	Mississippi Veterans Memorial Stadium; Jackson, MS	ESPNU	W 38–34	44,000
October 25	5:00 p.m.	vs. Grambling State	No. 12	Allegiant Stadium; Las Vegas, NV (Las Vegas HBCU Classic)	HBCU Go	L 24–26	29,655
November 1	6:00 p.m.	at Florida A&M	No. 23	Bragg Memorial Stadium; Tallahassee, FL	ESPN+	W 41–16	13,104
November 8	2:00 p.m.	at Mississippi Valley State	No. 23	Rice–Totten Stadium; Itta Bena, MS	SWAC TV	W 42–3	8,927
November 15	12:00 p.m.	Bethune–Cookman	No. 22	Mississippi Veterans Memorial Stadium; Jackson, MS	theGrio	W 28–13	23,348
November 22	2:30 p.m.	Alcorn State	No. 20	Mississippi Veterans Memorial Stadium; Jackson, MS (Soul Bowl)	ESPN+	W 27–21	44,097
December 6	1:00 p.m.	Prairie View A&M	No. 20	Mississippi Veterans Memorial Stadium; Jackson, MS (SWAC Championship)	ESPN2	L 21–23	32,187
*Non-conference game; Rankings from STATS Poll released prior to the game; All times are in Central time

== Roster ==
2025 Jackson State Tigers football team roster
Players
Coaches
Offense

Pos.	#	Name	Class
RB	0	Travis Terrell Jr.	So
WR	1	Shemar Savage	GS
WR	2	Ja'Naylon Dupree	Sr
WR	3	Nate Rembert	Jr
WR	4	Tyquan Henderson	GS
WR	5	Kobe Paul	GS
WR	6	Joanes Fortilien	Jr
WR	7	Jameel Gardner Jr.	Jr
RB	8	Kenan Christon II	GS
RB	9	Desmond Moultrie	GS
RB	10	Donerio Davenport	Sr
QB	11	Jared Lockhart	Fr
QB	12	Parker Stofa	Fr
WR	13	Jabari Jones	Fr
RB	14	Bryson Moss	GS
QB	15	Jacobian Morgan	GS
WR	17	Errick Simmons	GS
QB	18	Ethan Terrell	Fr
RB	22	Nate Blount IV	Fr
RB	27	Ahmad Miller	So
RB	30	Emari Matthews	Jr
RB	33	Jeremiah Wilson Jr.	Fr
RB	35	Trevon Evans	Fr
TE	45	Kenneth Jiles Jr.	GS
OL	51	Alex Valbuena	Jr
OL	54	Ace Meadows	So
OL	55	Kale Armstrong	Fr
OL	56	Brian Williams Jr.	Fr
OL	58	Cameron James	GS
OL	59	Jamal Gowans	Fr
OL	60	Devin Love	Fr
OL	61	Cyson Burk	Fr
OL	62	Almetrius Smith Jr.	Sr
OL	65	Mason Barton	So
OL	66	Jackson King	Fr
OL	69	Dequarious White	So
OL	70	Ryan Anderson	Fr
OL	72	Isaiah Villanneuva	Jr
OL	74	D'Andre Townes-Blue	GS
OL	75	Xavion Davis	So
OL	77	Bruno Zandamela	Jr
OL	79	Quaveon Davis	Jr
TE	81	Jency Riley	GS
WR	82	Cameron Onyebuagu	Fr
TE	83	Sebastien Saint-Louis	So
WR	84	Amarion Brown	Fr
TE	85	Darren Bennett	Sr
TE	88	Marvin Landy	GS

Defense

Pos.	#	Name	Class
DL	0	Jeremiah Williams	Sr
DB	1	Khamauri Rogers	GS
DB	2	Levi Wyatt	Sr
LB	3	Ashton Taylor	Jr
DB	4	Mike Smith III	So
DB	5	Shamar Hawkins	Sr
DL	6	Quincy Ivory	Sr
LB	7	Reid Pulliam	Sr
EDGE	8	John Brown	GS
DB	9	B.J. Washington	Sr
LB	11	Carmelo Jones	So
DB	12	Anthony Enechukwu	GS
DL	14	Jaylan Ware	GS
DB	15	Kam Sallis	So
EDGE	16	Jace Ward	So
DB	17	KJ Chisholm	So
EDGE	18	Kanye Varner	Sr
DB	19	Frankie Dunn	GS
DB	23	Camden Hardy	Sr
DB	24	Jordan Helton	GS
LB	25	Kenzavius Lundy	Fr
DB	26	Josh Higgins	GS
LB	28	Keith Bass Jr.	Fr
LB	29	Kam Evans	Fr
LB	31	Michael Robinson Jr.	GS
LB	32	J'Cori Hargon	Jr
EDGE	40	Braxton Barney	So
DB	46	Eric Hughes	So
DB	47	Jaylin Acker	So
DB	48	Dazerick Patton	GS
DL	50	Tymon Wells	Sr
LB	53	Jamarion Davis	So
LB	57	Bryce Owens	So
DL	63	Kejuan Barbee	Sr
DL	90	Dimonyai Lacey	Sr
DL	91	Braylon Brown	Fr
DL	93	Zalan Barrett	Jr
DL	94	Stanley Cooks	So
DL	95	Kazarius Bowie	GS
DL	96	Zyon Gilmore	Jr
DL	99	Wayne Patterson	Fr

Special teams

Pos.	#	Name	Class
K/P	37	Donovan Warren	GS
K/P	38	Gerardo Baeza	GS
LS	43	Chris Levy	Fr
LS	44	Hunter Burns	GS
K	86	Simon Naylor	Fr
P	89	Kye Collins	Jr

Head coach

- T. C. Taylor

Coordinators/assistant coaches

- Otis Riddley (Associate head coach / Tight ends / General manager)
- Eric Gallon (Assistant head coach / Running backs)
- Aaron Jackson (Defensive line)
- Javancy Jones (Special Teams coordinator / Outside linebackers)
- Rip Kirk (Co-Offensive Coordinator / Quarterbacks)
- Mario Magana Jr. (Cornerbacks / Director of Player Personnel)
- Vincent Marshall (Passing Game Coordinator / Wide receivers)
- Torenzo Quinn (Defensive coordinator / Secondary)
- Manny Ramirez (Co-Offensive Coordinator / Offensive line)
- Justin Sanders (Linebackers)
- Esaias Guthrie (Defensive Analyst / Assistant safeties)

Legend

- (C) Team captain
- (S) Suspended
- (I) Ineligible
- Injured
- Redshirt

Roster
Last update: August 19, 2025

== Game summaries ==
=== Hampton ===
Hampton Pirates (0-0) at No. 17 Jackson State Tigers (0-0) – Game summary

Quarter	1	2	3	4	Total
Pirates	7	0	0	7	14
No. 17 Tigers	7	7	0	14	28

at Mississippi Veterans Memorial Stadium • Jackson, MS

- Date: August 30
- Game time: 2:00 PM CDT
- Game weather: Sunny
- Game attendance: 13,576
- Referee: Preston Clipper
- TV announcers (HBCU Go): James Hadnot (play-by-play), Jon Kelley (analyst) and Lawrencia Moten (sideline)

Game information

First Quarter

- (12:23) HU – Ja'Quan Snipes 3-yard run, Brett Starling kick (Drive: 5 plays, 75 yards, 2:37; Hampton 7–0)
- (7:48) JSU – Emari Matthews 2-yard run, Gerardo Baeza kick (Drive: 3 plays, 19 yards, 1:38; Tied 7–7)

Second Quarter

- (14:35) JSU – Donerio Davenport 6-yard run, Gerardo Baeza kick (Drive: 7 plays, 67 yards, 2:44; Jackson State 14–7)

Third Quarter

No scoring plays

Fourth Quarter

- (10:44) HU – MarShawn Ferguson Jr. 30-yard pass from Isaiah Freeman, Brett Starling kick (Drive: 3 plays, 55 yards, 0:50; Tied 14–14)
- (5:32) JSU – Ahmad Miller 2-yard run, Gerardo Baeza kick (Drive: 12 plays, 82 yards, 5:03; Jackson State 21–14)
- (4:00) JSU – Ahmad Miller 76-yard run, Gerardo Baeza kick (Drive: 1 play, 76 yards, 0:13; Jackson State 28–14)

Statistics	HAMP	JKST
First downs	20	19
Total yards	376	426
Rushing yards	175	283
Passing yards	201	143
Passing: Comp–Att–Int	21–29–1	15–30–0
Time of possession	33:33	26:27

Team	Category	Player	Statistics
Hampton	Passing	Isaiah Freeman	10/17, 117 yards, TD, INT
Hampton	Rushing	Isaiah Freeman	13 carries, 94 yards
Hampton	Receiving	MarShawn Ferguson Jr.	5 receptions, 59 yards, TD
Jackson State	Passing	JaCobian Morgan	15/30, 143 yards
Jackson State	Rushing	Ahmad Miller	10 carries, 172 yards, 2 TD
Jackson State	Receiving	Joanes Fortilien	5 receptions, 43 yards

=== at Southern Miss (FBS) ===
No. 15 Jackson State Tigers (1–0) at Southern Miss Golden Eagles (FBS) (0–1) – Game summary

Quarter	1	2	3	4	Total
No. 15 Tigers	3	7	0	10	20
Golden Eagles (FBS)	14	3	7	14	38

at M. M. Roberts Stadium • Hattiesburg, MS

- Date: September 6, 2025
- Game time: 4:00 PM CDT
- Game weather: Cloudy • Temperature: 87 °F (31 °C) • Wind: NW 7 mph
- Game attendance: 32,011
- Referee: Trennis Livingston
- TV announcers (ESPN+): Jason Baker (play-by-play) and Austin Davis (analyst)

Game information

First quarter

- USM – Zach Ruffin 30-yard punt return (Reed Harradine kick), 12:06. Golden Eagles 7–0.
- JKST – Gerardo Baeza 46-yard field goal, 4:45. Golden Eagles 7–3. Drive: 8 plays, 44 yards, 3:45.
- USM – Bralon Brown 8-yard pass from Braylon Braxton (Reed Harradine kick), 0:23. Golden Eagles 14–3. Drive: 12 plays, 87 yards, 4:15.

Second quarter

- JKST – Emari Matthews 21-yard run (Gerardo Baeza kick), 13:16. Golden Eagles 14–10. Drive: 5 plays, 75 yards, 2:07.
- USM – Reed Harradine 35-yard field goal, 10:44. Golden Eagles 17–10. Drive: 7 plays, 58 yards, 2:32.

Third quarter

- USM – Micah Davis 15-yard pass from Braylon Braxton (Reed Harradine kick), 5:29. Golden Eagles 24–10. Drive: 7 plays, 45 yards, 2:48.

Fourth quarter

- USM – Kadinn Morris 10-yard pass from Braylon Braxton (Reed Harradine kick), 14:54. Golden Eagles 31–10. Drive: 11 plays, 65 yards, 3:51.
- JKST – Gerardo Baeza 40-yard field goal, 13:24. Golden Eagles 31–13. Drive: 4 plays, 0 yards, 1:17.
- USM – Robert Briggs 15-yard run (Reed Harradine kick), 9:59. Golden Eagles 38–13. Drive: 7 plays, 75 yards, 3:25.
- JKST – Ahmad Miller 8-yard run (Gerardo Baeza kick), 5:32. Golden Eagles 38–20. Drive: 11 plays, 75 yards, 4:18.

Statistics	JKST	USM
First downs	19	25
Plays–yards	70–322	68–363
Rushes–yards	42–191	36–139
Passing yards	131	224
Passing: Comp–Att–Int	14–28–2	22–32–0
Turnovers	2	0
Time of possession	31:15	28:45

Team	Category	Player	Statistics
Jackson State	Passing	Jacobian Morgan	14/27, 131 yards, INT
Jackson State	Rushing	Travis Terrell Jr.	10 carries, 80 yards
Jackson State	Receiving	Nate Rembert	4 receptions, 64 yards
Southern Miss	Passing	Braylon Braxton	20/30, 214 yards, 3 TD
Southern Miss	Rushing	Jeffery Pittman	10 carries, 71 yards
Southern Miss	Receiving	Bralon Brown	3 receptions, 52 yards, TD

=== Tuskegee (DII) ===
Tuskegee Golden Tigers (DII) (2-0) at No. 19 Jackson State Tigers (1-1) – Game summary

Quarter	1	2	3	4	Total
Golden Tigers (DII)	0	0	0	0	0
No. 19 Tigers	7	14	9	0	30

at Mississippi Veterans Memorial Stadium • Jackson, MS

- Date: September 13
- Game time: 2:00 PM CDT
- Game weather: Sunny • Temperature: 92 °F (33 °C) • Wind: E at 2 miles per hour (3.2 km/h)
- Game attendance: 18,642
- Referee: Eric Bluntson
- TV announcers (SWAC TV): Mo Carter (play-by-play) and Tolly Carr (analyst)

Game information

First Quarter

- (11:53) JSU – Jared Lockhart 11-yard run, Gerardo Baeza kick (Drive: 5 plays, 52 yards, 2:01; Jackson State 7–0)

Second Quarter

- (14:07) JSU – Jared Lockhart 6-yard run, Gerardo Baeza kick (Drive: 8 plays, 77 yards, 2:51; Jackson State 14–0)
- (1:55) JSU – Jameel Gardner Jr. 21-yard pass from Jared Lockhart, Gerardo Baeza kick (Drive: 15 plays, 68 yards, 6:18; Jackson State 21–0)

Third Quarter

- (4:28) JSU – Reid Pulliam 0-yard safety (Jackson State 23–0)
- (0:08) JSU – Parker Stofa 1-yard run, Gerardo Baeza kick (Drive: 8 plays, 63 yards, 4:14; Jackson State 30–0)

Fourth Quarter

No scoring plays

Statistics	TUSK	JKST
First downs	7	26
Total yards	109	522
Rushing yards	24	266
Passing yards	85	256
Passing: Comp–Att–Int	11–20–0	16–23–1
Time of possession	23:22	36:38

Team	Category	Player	Statistics
Tuskegee	Passing	Raequan Beal	9/17, 93 yards
Tuskegee	Rushing	Johnny Morris	11 carries, 32 yards
Tuskegee	Receiving	EJ Hall	3 receptions, 39 yards
Jackson State	Passing	Jared Lockhart	15/21, 254 yards, TD, INT
Jackson State	Rushing	Ahmad Miller	8 carries, 68 yards
Jackson State	Receiving	Jameel Gardner Jr.	4 receptions, 85 yards, TD

=== at Southern (rivalry) ===
No. 19 Jackson State Tigers (2-1) at Southern Jaguars (1-3) – Game summary

Quarter	1	2	3	4	Total
No. 19 Tigers	7	10	7	14	38
Jaguars	3	10	0	0	13

at A. W. Mumford Stadium • Baton Rouge, LA

- Date: September 27
- Game time: 6:00 PM CDT
- TV announcers (ESPN+): Tiffany Greene (play-by-play) and Jay Walker (analyst)

Statistics	JKST	SOU
First downs		
Total yards		
Rushing yards		
Passing yards		
Passing: Comp–Att–Int		
Time of possession		

Team	Category	Player	Statistics
Jackson State	Passing		
Jackson State	Rushing		
Jackson State	Receiving		
Southern	Passing		
Southern	Rushing		
Southern	Receiving		

=== vs. Alabama A&M ===
No. 17 Jackson State Tigers (3-1) vs. Alabama A&M Bulldogs (3-2) – Game summary

Quarter	1	2	3	4	Total
No. 17 Tigers	10	23	10	14	57
Bulldogs	7	3	14	0	24

at Ladd–Peebles Stadium • Mobile, AL

- Date: October 4
- Game time: 4:00 PM CDT
- TV announcers (HBCU Go): James Hadnot (play-by-play), Jon Kelley (analyst) and Lawrencia Moten (sideline)

Statistics	JKST	AAMU
First downs		
Total yards		
Rushing yards		
Passing yards		
Passing: Comp–Att–Int		
Time of possession		

Team	Category	Player	Statistics
Jackson State	Passing		
Jackson State	Rushing		
Jackson State	Receiving		
Alabama A&M	Passing		
Alabama A&M	Rushing		
Alabama A&M	Receiving		

=== Alabama State ===
Alabama State Hornets (4-1) vs. No. 15 Jackson State Tigers (4-1) – Game summary

Quarter	1	2	3	4	Total
Hornets	-	-	-	-	0
No. 15 Tigers	-	-	-	-	0

at Mississippi Veterans Memorial Stadium • Jackson, MS

- Date: October 11
- Game time: 2:30 PM CDT
- TV announcers (ESPNU): Tiffany Greene (play-by-play) and Jay Walker (analyst)

Statistics	ALST	JKST
First downs		
Total yards		
Rushing yards		
Passing yards		
Passing: Comp–Att–Int		
Time of possession		

Team	Category	Player	Statistics
Alabama State	Passing		
Alabama State	Rushing		
Alabama State	Receiving		
Jackson State	Passing		
Jackson State	Rushing		
Jackson State	Receiving		

=== vs. Grambling State ===
Grambling State Tigers (4-3) vs. No. 12 Jackson State Tigers (5-1) – Game summary

Quarter	1	2	3	4	Total
Grambling State	-	-	-	-	0
No. 12 Jackson State	-	-	-	-	0

at Allegiant Stadium • Paradise, NV

- Date: October 25
- Game time: 3:00 PM PDT
- TV announcers (HBCU Go): James Hadnot (play by play), Jon Kelley (analyst) and Lawrencia Moten (sideline reporter)

Statistics	GRAM	JKST
First downs		
Total yards		
Rushing yards		
Passing yards		
Passing: Comp–Att–Int		
Time of possession		

Team	Category	Player	Statistics
Grambling State	Passing		
Grambling State	Rushing		
Grambling State	Receiving		
Jackson State	Passing		
Jackson State	Rushing		
Jackson State	Receiving		

=== at Florida A&M ===
No. 23 Jackson State Tigers (5-2) vs. Florida A&M Rattlers (3-4) – Game summary

Quarter	1	2	3	4	Total
No. 23 Tigers	-	-	-	-	0
Rattlers	-	-	-	-	0

at Bragg Memorial Stadium • Tallahassee, FL

- Date: November 1
- Game time: 7:00 PM EDT
- TV announcers (ESPN+): Tiffany Greene (play by play) and Forrest Conoly (analyst)

Statistics	JKST	FAMU
First downs		
Total yards		
Rushing yards		
Passing yards		
Passing: Comp–Att–Int		
Time of possession		

Team	Category	Player	Statistics
Jackson State	Passing		
Jackson State	Rushing		
Jackson State	Receiving		
Florida A&M	Passing		
Florida A&M	Rushing		
Florida A&M	Receiving		

=== at Mississippi Valley State ===
No. 23 Jackson State Tigers (6-2) vs. Mississippi Valley State Delta Devils (1-7) – Game summary

Quarter	1	2	3	4	Total
No. 23 Tigers	-	-	-	-	0
Delta Devils	-	-	-	-	0

at Rice–Totten Stadium • Itta Bena, MS

- Date: November 8
- Game time: 2:00 PM CST
- TV announcers (SWAC TV): Charles Bishop (play by play) and Charles Porter (analyst)

Statistics	JKST	MVSU
First downs		
Total yards		
Rushing yards		
Passing yards		
Passing: Comp–Att–Int		
Time of possession		

Team	Category	Player	Statistics
Jackson State	Passing		
Jackson State	Rushing		
Jackson State	Receiving		
Mississippi Valley State	Passing		
Mississippi Valley State	Rushing		
Mississippi Valley State	Receiving		

=== Bethune–Cookman ===
Bethune–Cookman Wildcats (5-5) vs. No. 22 Jackson State Tigers (7-2) – Game summary

Quarter	1	2	3	4	Total
Wildcats	-	-	-	-	0
No. 22 Tigers	-	-	-	-	0

at Mississippi Veterans Memorial Stadium • Jackson, MS

- Date: November 15
- Game time: 12:00 PM CST
- TV announcers (TheGrio): Derrin Horton (play by play), Steve Wyche (analyst) and Nia Symone (sideline reporter)

Statistics	BCU	JKST
First downs		
Total yards		
Rushing yards		
Passing yards		
Passing: Comp–Att–Int		
Time of possession		

Team	Category	Player	Statistics
Bethune–Cookman	Passing		
Bethune–Cookman	Rushing		
Bethune–Cookman	Receiving		
Jackson State	Passing		
Jackson State	Rushing		
Jackson State	Receiving		

=== Alcorn State (Soul Bowl) ===
Alcorn State Braves (5-6) vs. No. 20 Jackson State Tigers (8-2) – Game summary

Quarter	1	2	3	4	Total
Braves	-	-	-	-	0
No. 20 Tigers	-	-	-	-	0

at Mississippi Veterans Memorial Stadium • Jackson, MS

- Date: November 22
- Game time: 2:30 PM CST
- TV announcers (ESPN+): Jason Ross Jr. (play by play) and Tyoka Jackson (analyst)

Statistics	ALCN	JKST
First downs		
Total yards		
Rushing yards		
Passing yards		
Passing: Comp–Att–Int		
Time of possession		

Team	Category	Player	Statistics
Alcorn State	Passing		
Alcorn State	Rushing		
Alcorn State	Receiving		
Jackson State	Passing		
Jackson State	Rushing		
Jackson State	Receiving		

== Ranking movements ==
Ranking movements Legend: ██ Increase in ranking ██ Decrease in ranking RV = Received votes
	Week														
Poll	Pre	1	2	3	4	5	6	7	8	9	10	11	12	13	Final
STATS FCS	17	15	19	20	19	17	15	14	12	23	23	22	20	20	RV
Coaches	17	14	15	16	17	17	14	13	11	20	19	16	15	12	22
