= 2025 Alabama State Hornets football team =

American college football season

2025 Alabama State Hornets football
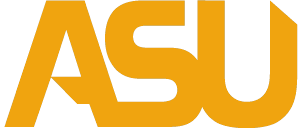

SWAC East Division co-champion
- Conference: Southwestern Athletic Conference
- East Division
- Record: 10–2 (7–1 SWAC)
- Head coach: Eddie Robinson Jr. (4th season)
- Offensive coordinator: Chris Barnette (2nd season)
- Co-defensive coordinators: Billy Gresham (1st season); Todd Middleton (1st season)
- Home stadium: ASU Stadium

2025 Southwestern Athletic Conference football standings
	Conf.			Overall
Team	W		L	W		L
East Division
Jackson State xy	7	–	1	9	–	3
Alabama State x	7	–	1	10	–	2
Bethune–Cookman	5	–	3	6	–	6
Florida A&M	4	–	4	5	–	7
Alabama A&M	1	–	7	4	–	8
Mississippi Valley State*	1	–	7	2	–	10
West Division
Prairie View A&M xy$	7	–	1	10	–	4
Texas Southern	5	–	3	6	–	5
Alcorn State	4	–	4	5	–	7
Grambling State	4	–	4	7	–	5
Arkansas–Pine Bluff*	2	–	6	4	–	8
Southern	1	–	7	2	–	10
Championship: Prairie View A&M 23, Jackson State 21
$ – Conference champion; x – Division champion/co-champions; y – Championship game participant; * – Ineligible for FCS postseason play due to failed academic requirements; Rankings from STATS Poll

The 2025 Alabama State Hornets football team represented Alabama State University as a member of the Southwestern Athletic Conference (SWAC) during the 2025 NCAA Division I FCS football season. The Hornets were led by fourth-year head coach Eddie Robinson and played at ASU Stadium in Montgomery, Alabama.

The Alabama State Hornets drew an average home attendance of 20,618, the 7th-highest of all NCAA Division I FCS football teams.

== Schedule ==
Date	Time	Opponent	Site	TV	Result	Attendance
August 28	7:30 p.m.	at UAB*	Protective Stadium; Birmingham, AL	ESPN+	L 42–52	26,294
September 6	6:00 p.m.	at Southern (Note: The game against Southern, a fellow member of the SWAC, is played as non-conference game and does not count in the league standings.)*	A. W. Mumford Stadium; Baton Rouge, LA	ESPN+	W 30–7	17,195
September 13	4:00 p.m.	Miles*	ASU Stadium; Montgomery, AL	TheGrio	W 37–9	18,101
September 27	2:00 p.m.	at Florida A&M	Bragg Memorial Stadium; Tallahassee, FL	HBCU Go	W 42–14	13,515
October 4	2:00 p.m.	Bethune–Cookman^{†}	ASU Stadium; Montgomery, AL	SWAC TV	W 52–35	24,736
October 11	2:30 p.m.	at No. 15 Jackson State	Mississippi Veterans Memorial Stadium; Jackson, MS	ESPNU	L 34–38	44,000
October 25	2:30 p.m.	vs. Alabama A&M	Legion Field; Birmingham, AL (Magic City Classic)	ESPN+	W 56–13	69,372
November 1	2:00 p.m.	at Prairie View A&M	Panther Stadium; Prairie View, TX	SWAC TV	W 31–28	5,962
November 8	2:00 p.m.	Texas Southern	ASU Stadium; Montgomery, AL	SWAC TV	W 42–24	17,625
November 15	4:00 p.m.	vs. Mississippi Valley State	Ladd–Peebles Stadium; Mobile, AL	SWAC TV	W 41–3	6,123
November 22	1:00 p.m.	Arkansas–Pine Bluff	ASU Stadium; Montgomery, AL	TheGrio	W 44–13	19,372
November 27	2:00 p.m.	Tuskegee*	ASU Stadium; Montgomery, AL (Turkey Day Classic)	SWAC TV	W 58–21	23,256
*Non-conference game; ^{†}Homecoming; Rankings from STATS Poll released prior to the game; All times are in Central time

== Game summaries ==
=== at UAB (FBS) ===
Alabama State Hornets (0–0) at UAB Blazers (FBS) (0–0) – Game summary

Quarter	1	2	3	4	Total
Hornets	7	14	7	14	42
Blazers (FBS)	10	7	21	14	52

at Protective Stadium • Birmingham, Alabama

- Date: August 28
- Game time: 7:30 PM CDT
- Game weather: Sunny • Temperature: 73 °F (23 °C) • Wind: W at 6 miles per hour (9.7 km/h)
- Game attendance: 26,294
- Referee: Tim Rich
- TV announcers (ESPN+): Doug Sherman (play-by-play) and Dave Steckel (analyst)

Game information

First quarter

- (11:39) UAB – Jonah Delange 42-yard field goal (Drive: 8 plays, 39 yards, 3:15; UAB 3–0)
- (10:57) ALST – Andrew Body 60-yard run, Andrew Abu-Akel kick (Drive: 2 plays, 75 yards, 0:42; Alabama State 7–3)
- (6:23) UAB – Iverson Hooks 8-yard pass from Jalen Kitna, Jonah Delange kick (Drive: 11 plays, 73 yards, 4:29; UAB 10–7)

Second quarter

- (14:56) ALST – Dylan Djete 14-yard pass from Andrew Body, Andrew Abu-Akel kick (Drive: 10 plays, 81 yards, 6:04; Alabama State 14–10)
- (14:02) UAB – Corri Milliner 49-yard pass from Jalen Kitna, Jonah Delange kick (Drive: 3 plays, 81 yards, 0:50; UAB 17–14)
- (0:05) ALST – Ajai Harrell 31-yard pass from Andrew Body, Andrew Abu-Akel kick (Drive: 16 plays, 96 yards, 8:27; Alabama State 21–17)

Third quarter

- (10:10) ALST – Asa Gregg 5-yard pass from Andrew Body, Andrew Abu-Akel kick (Drive: 10 plays, 68 yards, 4:45; Alabama State 28–17)
- (7:45) UAB – Jevon Jackson 3-yard run, run failed (Drive: 6 plays, 66 yards, 2:18; Alabama State 28–23)
- (4:10) UAB – Solomon Beebe 5-yard run, Jevon Jackson run (Drive: 4 plays, 33 yards, 1:52; UAB 31–28)
- (1:42) UAB – Jevon Jackson 46-yard run, Jonah Delange kick (Drive: 2 plays, 56 yards, 0:48; UAB 38–28)

Fourth quarter

- (13:09) ALST – Jamarie Hostzclaw 7-yard run, Andrew Abu-Akel kick (Drive: 6 plays, 68 yards, 3:27; UAB 38–35)
- (8:21) UAB – Isaiah Jacobs 5-yard run, Jonah Delange kick (Drive: 10 plays, 60 yards, 4:39; UAB 45–35)
- (4:18) ALST – Jalen Jones 69-yard pass from Andrew Body, Andrew Abu-Akel kick (Drive: 7 plays, 75 yards, 4:03; UAB 45–42)
- (1:19) UAB – Solomon Beebe 7-yard run, Jonah Delange kick (Drive: 7 plays, 67 yards, 2:57; UAB 52–42)

Statistics	ALST	UAB
First downs	26	24
Plays–yards	65–514	58–520
Rushes–yards	41–202	35–273
Passing yards	312	247
Passing: comp–att–int	18–24–0	18–23–0
Turnovers	1	0
Time of possession	34:14	25:46

Team	Category	Player	Statistics
Alabama State	Passing	Andrew Body	18/24, 312 yards, 4 TD
Alabama State	Rushing	Andrew Body	16 carries, 119 yards, TD
Alabama State	Receiving	Jalen Jones	6 receptions, 174 yards, TD
UAB	Passing	Jalen Kitna	18/23, 247 yards, 2 TD
UAB	Rushing	Jevon Jackson	17 carries, 166 yards, 2 TD
UAB	Receiving	Corri Milliner	5 receptions, 98 yards, TD

=== at Southern ===
Alabama State Hornets (0-1) vs. Southern Jaguars (1-1) – Game summary

Quarter	1	2	3	4	Total
Hornets	3	3	17	7	30
Jaguars	0	0	7	0	7

at A. W. Mumford Stadium • Baton Rouge, LA

- Date: September 6
- Game time: 6:00 PM CDT
- Game weather: Sunny
- Game attendance: 17,195
- Referee: Preston Clipper
- TV announcers (ESPN+): Tiffany Greene (play-by-play) and Jay Walker (analyst)

Statistics	ALST	SOU
First downs		
Total yards		
Rushing yards		
Passing yards		
Passing: Comp–Att–Int		
Time of possession		

Team	Category	Player	Statistics
Alabama State	Passing		
Alabama State	Rushing		
Alabama State	Receiving		
Southern	Passing		
Southern	Rushing		
Southern	Receiving		

=== Miles (DII) ===
Miles Golden Bears (DII) (0-2) vs. Alabama State Hornets (1-1) – Game summary

Quarter	1	2	3	4	Total
Golden Bears (DII)	0	3	6	0	9
Hornets	10	21	0	6	37

at ASU Stadium • Montgomery, AL

- Date: September 13
- Game time: 4:00 PM CDT
- Game weather: Sunny • Temperature: 84 °F (29 °C)
- Game attendance: 18,101
- Referee: Charles Green
- TV announcers (TheGrio): Derrin Horton (play-by-play), Steve Wyche (analyst) and Nia Symone (sideline)

Statistics	MIL	ALST
First downs		
Total yards		
Rushing yards		
Passing yards		
Passing: Comp–Att–Int		
Time of possession		

Team	Category	Player	Statistics
Miles	Passing		
Miles	Rushing		
Miles	Receiving		
Alabama State	Passing		
Alabama State	Rushing		
Alabama State	Receiving		

=== at Florida A&M ===
Alabama State Hornets (2-1) vs. Florida A&M Rattlers (1-2) – Game summary

Quarter	1	2	3	4	Total
Hornets	7	7	14	14	42
Rattlers	0	6	0	8	14

at Bragg Memorial Stadium • Tallahassee, FL

- Date: September 27
- Game time: 3:00 PM EDT
- Game weather: Sunny • Temperature: 85 °F (29 °C) • Wind: 10 miles per hour (16 km/h)
- Game attendance: 13,515
- Referee: Charles Green
- TV announcers (HBCU Go): James Hadnot (play-by-play), Jon Kelley (analyst), and Lawrencia Moten (sideline)

Statistics	ALST	FAMU
First downs		
Total yards		
Rushing yards		
Passing yards		
Passing: Comp–Att–Int		
Time of possession		

Team	Category	Player	Statistics
Alabama State	Passing		
Alabama State	Rushing		
Alabama State	Receiving		
Florida A&M	Passing		
Florida A&M	Rushing		
Florida A&M	Receiving		

=== Bethune–Cookman ===
Bethune–Cookman Wildcats (2-3) vs. Alabama State Hornets (3-1) – Game summary

Quarter	1	2	3	4	Total
Wildcats	7	7	7	14	35
Hornets	17	14	14	7	52

at ASU Stadium • Montgomery, AL

- Date: October 4
- Game time: 2:30 PM CDT
- Game weather: Cloudy • Temperature: 82 °F (28 °C) • Wind: E at 10 miles per hour (16 km/h)
- Game attendance: 24,736
- Referee: Ivan Daniels
- TV announcers (SWAC TV): Santoria Black (play-by-play), Ossie Clark (analyst), and Faith Daniels (sideline)

Statistics	BCU	ALST
First downs		
Total yards		
Rushing yards		
Passing yards		
Passing: Comp–Att–Int		
Time of possession		

Team	Category	Player	Statistics
Bethune–Cookman	Passing		
Bethune–Cookman	Rushing		
Bethune–Cookman	Receiving		
Alabama State	Passing		
Alabama State	Rushing		
Alabama State	Receiving		

=== at No. 15 Jackson State ===
Alabama State Hornets (4-1) vs. No. 15 Jackson State Tigers (4-1) – Game summary

Quarter	1	2	3	4	Total
Hornets	0	13	7	14	34
No. 15 Tigers	7	10	7	14	38

at Mississippi Veterans Memorial Stadium • Jackson, MS

- Date: October 11
- Game time: 2:30 PM CDT
- Game weather: Sunny
- Game attendance: 44,000
- Referee: Preston Clipper
- TV announcers (ESPNU): Tiffany Greene (play-by-play) and Jay Walker (analyst)

Statistics	ALST	JKST
First downs		
Total yards		
Rushing yards		
Passing yards		
Passing: Comp–Att–Int		
Time of possession		

Team	Category	Player	Statistics
Alabama State	Passing		
Alabama State	Rushing		
Alabama State	Receiving		
Jackson State	Passing		
Jackson State	Rushing		
Jackson State	Receiving		

=== vs. Alabama A&M (Magic City Classic) ===
Alabama A&M Bulldogs (4-3) vs. Alabama State Hornets (4-2) – Game summary

Quarter	1	2	3	4	Total
Bulldogs	6	0	7	0	13
Hornets	21	28	7	0	56

at Legion Field • Birmingham, AL

- Date: October 25
- Game time: 2:30 PM CDT
- Game weather: Sunny • Temperature: 75 °F (24 °C) • Wind: E at 9 miles per hour (14 km/h)
- Game attendance: 69,372
- Referee: Preston Clipper
- TV announcers (ESPN+): Tiffany Greene (play-by-play) and Jay Walker (analyst)

Statistics	AAMU	ALST
First downs		
Total yards		
Rushing yards		
Passing yards		
Passing: Comp–Att–Int		
Time of possession		

Team	Category	Player	Statistics
Alabama A&M	Passing		
Alabama A&M	Rushing		
Alabama A&M	Receiving		
Alabama State	Passing		
Alabama State	Rushing		
Alabama State	Receiving		

=== at Prairie View A&M ===
Alabama State Hornets (5-2) vs. Prairie View A&M Panthers (6-2) – Game summary

Quarter	1	2	3	4	Total
Hornets	-	-	-	-	0
Panthers	-	-	-	-	0

at Panther Stadium • Prairie View, TX

- Date: November 1
- Game time: 2:00 PM CDT
- TV announcers (SWAC TV): Butch Alsandor (play-by-play), Jorge Vargas (analyst), and Shaquira Martin (sideline)

Statistics	ALST	PV
First downs		
Total yards		
Rushing yards		
Passing yards		
Passing: Comp–Att–Int		
Time of possession		

Team	Category	Player	Statistics
Alabama State	Passing		
Alabama State	Rushing		
Alabama State	Receiving		
Prairie View A&M	Passing		
Prairie View A&M	Rushing		
Prairie View A&M	Receiving		

=== Texas Southern ===
Texas Southern Tigers (4-4) vs. Alabama State Hornets (6-2) – Game summary

Quarter	1	2	3	4	Total
Tigers	-	-	-	-	0
Hornets	-	-	-	-	0

at ASU Stadium • Montgomery, AL

- Date: November 8
- Game time: 2:00 PM CST
- TV announcers (SWAC TV): Santoria Black (play by play), Stan Becton (analyst) and Faith Daniels (sideline reporter)

Statistics	TXSO	ALST
First downs		
Total yards		
Rushing yards		
Passing yards		
Passing: Comp–Att–Int		
Time of possession		

Team	Category	Player	Statistics
Texas Southern	Passing		
Texas Southern	Rushing		
Texas Southern	Receiving		
Alabama State	Passing		
Alabama State	Rushing		
Alabama State	Receiving		

=== vs. Mississippi Valley State ===
Alabama State Hornets (0-0) vs. Mississippi Valley State Delta Devils (0-0) – Game summary

Quarter	1	2	3	4	Total
Hornets	-	-	-	-	0
Delta Devils	-	-	-	-	0

at Ladd–Peebles Stadium • Mobile, AL

- Date: November 15
- Game time: 4:00 PM CST
- TV announcers (SWAC TV): Charles Bishop (play by play) and Charles Porter (analyst)

Statistics	ALST	MVSU
First downs		
Total yards		
Rushing yards		
Passing yards		
Passing: Comp–Att–Int		
Time of possession		

Team	Category	Player	Statistics
Alabama State	Passing		
Alabama State	Rushing		
Alabama State	Receiving		
Mississippi Valley State	Passing		
Mississippi Valley State	Rushing		
Mississippi Valley State	Receiving		

=== Arkansas–Pine Bluff ===
Arkansas–Pine Bluff Golden Lions (0-0) vs. Alabama State Hornets (0-0) – Game summary

Quarter	1	2	3	4	Total
Golden Lions	-	-	-	-	0
Hornets	-	-	-	-	0

at ASU Stadium • Montgomery, AL

- Date: November 22
- Game time: 1:00 PM CST
- TV announcers (TheGrio): Derrin Horton (play by play), Steve Wyche (analyst) and Nia Symone (sideline reporter)

Statistics	UAPB	ALST
First downs		
Total yards		
Rushing yards		
Passing yards		
Passing: Comp–Att–Int		
Time of possession		

Team	Category	Player	Statistics
Arkansas–Pine Bluff	Passing		
Arkansas–Pine Bluff	Rushing		
Arkansas–Pine Bluff	Receiving		
Alabama State	Passing		
Alabama State	Rushing		
Alabama State	Receiving		

=== Tuskegee (DII, Turkey Day Classic) ===
Tuskegee Golden Tigers (DII) (0-0) vs. Alabama State Hornets (0-0) – Game summary

Quarter	1	2	3	4	Total
Golden Tigers (DII)	21	0	0	0	21
Hornets	14	24	14	6	58

at ASU Stadium • Montgomery, AL

- Date: November 27
- Game time: 2:00 PM CST
- Game weather: Sunny • Temperature: 56 °F (13 °C) • Wind: NW at 11 miles per hour (18 km/h)
- Game attendance: 23,256
- Referee: Nathan Pinkard
- TV announcers (SWAC TV): Mo Carter (play by play) and Tolly Carr (analyst)

Statistics	TUSK	ALST
First downs		
Total yards		
Rushing yards		
Passing yards		
Passing: Comp–Att–Int		
Time of possession		

Team	Category	Player	Statistics
Tuskegee	Passing		
Tuskegee	Rushing		
Tuskegee	Receiving		
Alabama State	Passing		
Alabama State	Rushing		
Alabama State	Receiving		
