= 2025 Texas Southern Tigers football team =

American college football season

2025 Texas Southern Tigers football
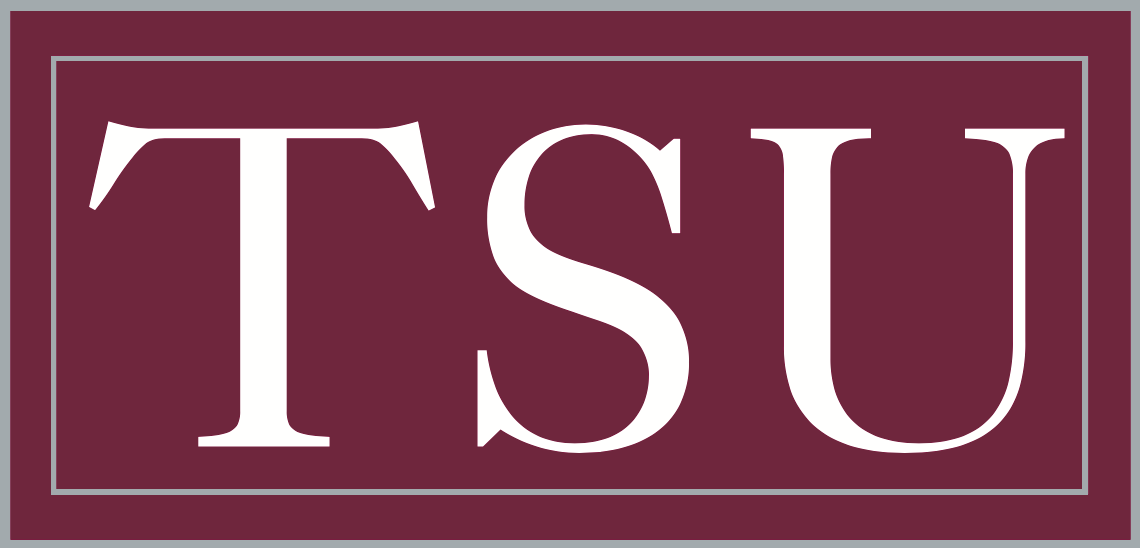
- Conference: Southwestern Athletic Conference
- West Division
- Record: 6–5 (5–3 SWAC)
- Head coach: Cris Dishman (2nd season)
- Offensive coordinator: Steven Smith (2nd season)
- Defensive coordinator: Billy Parker (2nd season)
- Home stadium: Shell Energy Stadium

2025 Southwestern Athletic Conference football standings
	Conf.			Overall
Team	W		L	W		L
East Division
Jackson State xy	7	–	1	9	–	3
Alabama State x	7	–	1	10	–	2
Bethune–Cookman	5	–	3	6	–	6
Florida A&M	4	–	4	5	–	7
Alabama A&M	1	–	7	4	–	8
Mississippi Valley State*	1	–	7	2	–	10
West Division
Prairie View A&M xy$	7	–	1	10	–	4
Texas Southern	5	–	3	6	–	5
Alcorn State	4	–	4	5	–	7
Grambling State	4	–	4	7	–	5
Arkansas–Pine Bluff*	2	–	6	4	–	8
Southern	1	–	7	2	–	10
Championship: Prairie View A&M 23, Jackson State 21
$ – Conference champion; x – Division champion/co-champions; y – Championship game participant; * – Ineligible for FCS postseason play due to failed academic requirements; Rankings from STATS Poll

The 2025 Texas Southern Tigers football team represented Texas Southern University as a member of the Southwestern Athletic Conference (SWAC) during the 2025 NCAA Division I FCS football season. The Tigers were led by second-year head coach Cris Dishman and played at the Shell Energy Stadium in Houston, Texas.

== Schedule ==
Date	Time	Opponent	Site	TV	Result	Attendance
August 30	7:00 p.m.	Prairie View A&M	Shell Energy Stadium; Houston, TX (Labor Day Classic)	SWAC TV	L 21–22	19,638
September 6	5:00 p.m.	at California*	California Memorial Stadium; Berkeley, CA	ACCNX/ESPN+	L 3–35	35,898
September 13	6:00 p.m.	No. 24 Lamar*	Shell Energy Stadium; Houston, TX	SWAC TV	L 7–31	6,247
September 27	4:00 p.m.	at Mississippi Valley State	Rice–Totten Stadium; Itta Bena, MS	SWAC TV	W 23–20	3,826
October 4	6:00 p.m.	Arkansas–Pine Bluff	Husky Stadium; Houston, TX	SWAC TV	W 51–7	4,007
October 11	6:00 p.m.	at Grambling State	Eddie G. Robinson Memorial Stadium; Grambling, LA	ESPN+	W 21–20	15,763
October 18	2:00 p.m.	VUL*	Alexander Durley Sports Complex; Houston, TX	SWAC TV	W 61–10	5,000
November 1	2:00 p.m.	Alcorn State	Shell Energy Stadium; Houston, TX	HBCU Go	L 14–33	3,983
November 8	2:00 p.m.	at Alabama State	ASU Stadium; Montgomery, AL	SWAC TV	L 24–42	17,625
November 15	2:00 p.m.	at Southern	A. W. Mumford Stadium; Baton Rouge, LA	SWAC TV	W 35–30	24,679
November 22	2:00 p.m.	Alabama A&M	Shell Energy Stadium; Houston, TX	HBCU Go	W 24–7	6,011
*Non-conference game; Rankings from STATS Poll released prior to the game; All times are in Central time

== Game summaries ==
=== Prairie View A&M (Labor Day Classic) ===
Prairie View A&M Panthers (0-0) at Texas Southern Tigers (0-0) – Game summary

Quarter	1	2	3	4	Total
Panthers	7	7	0	8	22
Tigers	7	7	0	7	21

at Shell Energy Stadium • Houston, TX

- Date: August 30
- Game time: 7:00 PM CDT
- Game attendance: 19,368
- Referee: Ivan Daniels
- TV announcers (SWAC TV): Butch Alsandor (play by play), Jorge Vargas (analyst) and Lauren Robertson (sideline reporter)

Game information

First quarter

- TXSO – Da'Veon Ford 10-yard run (Christian Avelar kick), 9:03. Tigers 7–0. Drive: 11 plays, 83 yards, 5:47.
- PV – Kheagian Heckaman 57-yard pass from Cameron Peters (Aiden Webb kick), 2:00. Tied 7–7. Drive: 6 plays, 85 yards, 6:46.

Second quarter

- PV – Cameron Franklin 5-yard run (Aiden Webb kick), 9:11. Panthers 14–7. Drive: 9 plays, 34 yards, 5:38.
- TXSO – Athean Renfro 20-yard run (Christian Avelar kick), 8:52. Tied 14–14. Drive: 1 play, 20 yards, 0:06.

Third quarter

No scoring plays.

Fourth quarter

- PV – Team Safety, 9:45. Panthers 16–14.
- TXSO – Roriyon Richardson 15-yard pass from KJ Cooper (Christian Avelar kick), 1:16. Tigers 21–16. Drive: 12 plays, 88 yards, 4:53.
- PV – Rodny Ojo 13-yard pass from Cameron Peters, 0:00. Panthers 22–21. Drive: 10 plays, 84 yards, 1:09.

Statistics	PV	TXSO
First downs	19	17
Total yards	425	258
Rushes–yards	30–130	30–126
Passing yards	295	132
Passing: Comp–Att–Int	22–38–1	11–16–0
Turnovers	1	0
Time of possession	38:10	21:50

Team	Category	Player	Statistics
Prairie View A&M	Passing	Cameron Peters	22/38, 295 yards, TD, INT
Prairie View A&M	Rushing	Chase Bingmon	9 carries, 50 yards
Prairie View A&M	Receiving	Kheagian Heckaman	2 receptions, 73 yards, TD
Texas Southern	Passing	KJ Cooper	11/16, 132 yards, TD
Texas Southern	Rushing	Athean Renfro	13 carries, 66 yards, TD
Texas Southern	Receiving	Roriyon Richardson	3 receptions, 57 yards, TD

=== at California (FBS) ===
Texas Southern Tigers (0-1) at California Golden Bears (FBS) (1-0) – Game summary

Quarter	1	2	3	4	Total
Tigers	0	0	0	3	3
Golden Bears (FBS)	3	8	14	10	35

at California Memorial Stadium • Berkeley, CA

- Date: September 6
- Game time: 3:00 PM PDT
- Game weather: Sunny
- Game attendance: 35,898
- Referee: Riley Johnson
- TV announcers (ACCNX/ESPN+): Chris Sylvester (play-by-play) and Ahman Green (analyst)

Game information

First quarter

- CAL – Abram Murray 44-yard field goal, 11:37. Golden Bears 3–0. Drive: 4 plays, 3 yards, 0:47.

Second quarter

- CAL – Jaron-Keawe Sagapolutele 1-yard run (Mason Mini run for two-point conversion), 1:19. Golden Bears 11–0. Drive: 12 plays, 86 yards, 4:54.

Third quarter

- CAL – Kendrick Raphael 1-yard run (Chase Meyer kick), 9:38. Golden Bears 18–0. Drive: 7 plays, 65 yards, 3:15.
- CAL – LJ Johnson Jr. 12-yard run (Chase Meyer kick), 5:27. Golden Bears 25–0. Drive: 6 plays, 32 yards, 2:30.

Fourth quarter

- TSU – Christian Avelar 39-yard field goal, 13:58. Golden Bears 25–3. Drive: 14 plays, 57 yards, 6:23.
- CAL – Chase Meyer 43-yard field goal, 10:18. Golden Bears 28–3. Drive: 8 plays, 38 yards, 3:33.
- CAL – Jayden Dixon-Veal 14-yard pass from Devin Brown (Chase Meyer kick), 3:09. Golden Bears 35–3. Drive: 11 plays, 90 yards, 5:32.

Statistics	TXSO	CAL
First downs	13	22
Total yards	192	467
Rushing yards	52	181
Passing yards	140	286
Passing: Comp–Att–Int	20–36–1	28–39–1
Turnovers	1	2
Time of possession	28:22	31:38

Team	Category	Player	Statistics
Texas Southern	Passing	KJ Cooper	19/35, 137 yards, INT
Texas Southern	Rushing	KJ Cooper	7 carries, 30 yards
Texas Southern	Receiving	Jalen Williams	6 receptions, 42 yards
California	Passing	Jaron-Keawe Sagapolutele	26/37, 259 yards, INT
California	Rushing	Kendrick Raphael	18 carries, 131 yards, TD
California	Receiving	Mark Hamper	5 receptions, 69 yards

=== No. 24 Lamar ===
No. 24 Lamar Cardinals (1-1) at Texas Southern Tigers (0-2) – Game summary

Quarter	1	2	3	4	Total
No. 24 Cardinals	-	-	-	-	0
Tigers	-	-	-	-	0

at Shell Energy Stadium • Houston, TX

- Date: September 13
- Game time: 6:00 PM CDT
- TV announcers (SWAC TV): Butch Alsandor (play-by-play) and Jorge Vargas (analyst)

Statistics	LAM	TXSO
First downs		
Total yards		
Rushing yards		
Passing yards		
Passing: Comp–Att–Int		
Time of possession		

Team	Category	Player	Statistics
Lamar	Passing		
Lamar	Rushing		
Lamar	Receiving		
Texas Southern	Passing		
Texas Southern	Rushing		
Texas Southern	Receiving		

=== at Mississippi Valley State ===
Texas Southern Tigers (0-3) vs. Mississippi Valley State Delta Devils (0-3) – Game summary

Quarter	1	2	3	4	Total
Tigers	0	7	7	9	23
Delta Devils	10	7	3	0	20

at Rice–Totten Stadium • Itta Bena, MS

- Date: September 27
- Game time: 4:00 PM CDT
- TV announcers (SWAC TV): Charles Bishop (play-by-play) and Charles Porter (analyst)

Statistics	TXSO	MVSU
First downs		
Total yards		
Rushing yards		
Passing yards		
Passing: Comp–Att–Int		
Time of possession		

Team	Category	Player	Statistics
Texas Southern	Passing		
Texas Southern	Rushing		
Texas Southern	Receiving		
Mississippi Valley State	Passing		
Mississippi Valley State	Rushing		
Mississippi Valley State	Receiving		

=== Arkansas–Pine Bluff ===
Arkansas–Pine Bluff Golden Lions (2-2) vs. Texas Southern Tigers (1-3) – Game summary

Quarter	1	2	3	4	Total
Golden Lions	0	0	0	7	7
Tigers	3	24	17	7	51

at Husky Stadium • Houston, TX

- Date: October 4
- Game time: 6:00 PM CDT
- TV announcers (SWAC TV): Butch Alsandor (play-by-play) and Jorge Vargas (analyst)

Statistics	UAPB	TXSO
First downs		
Total yards		
Rushing yards		
Passing yards		
Passing: Comp–Att–Int		
Time of possession		

Team	Category	Player	Statistics
Arkansas–Pine Bluff	Passing		
Arkansas–Pine Bluff	Rushing		
Arkansas–Pine Bluff	Receiving		
Texas Southern	Passing		
Texas Southern	Rushing		
Texas Southern	Receiving		

=== at Grambling State ===
Texas Southern Tigers (2-3) vs. Grambling State Tigers (3-2) – Game summary

Quarter	1	2	3	4	Total
Texas Southern	-	-	-	-	0
Grambling State	-	-	-	-	0

at Eddie Robinson Stadium • Grambling, LA

- Date: October 11
- Game time: 6:00 PM CDT
- TV announcers (ESPN+): Jason Ross Jr. (play by play) and Tyoka Jackson (analyst)

Statistics	TXSO	GRAM
First downs		
Total yards		
Rushing yards		
Passing yards		
Passing: Comp–Att–Int		
Time of possession		

Team	Category	Player	Statistics
Texas Southern	Passing		
Texas Southern	Rushing		
Texas Southern	Receiving		
Grambling State	Passing		
Grambling State	Rushing		
Grambling State	Receiving		

=== VUL (NCCAA) ===
VUL Dragons (NCCAA) (0-0) vs. Texas Southern Tigers (0-0) – Game summary

Quarter	1	2	3	4	Total
Dragons (NCCAA)	0	3	7	0	10
Tigers	17	20	14	10	61

at Alexander Durley Sports Complex • Houston, TX

- Date: October 18
- Game time: 2:00 PM CDT
- TV announcers (SWAC TV): Butch Alsandor (play by play) and Jorge Vargas (analyst)

Statistics	VUL	TXSO
First downs		
Total yards		
Rushing yards		
Passing yards		
Passing: Comp–Att–Int		
Time of possession		

Team	Category	Player	Statistics
VUL	Passing		
VUL	Rushing		
VUL	Receiving		
Texas Southern	Passing		
Texas Southern	Rushing		
Texas Southern	Receiving		

=== Alcorn State ===
Alcorn State Braves (2-6) vs. Texas Southern Tigers (4-3) – Game summary

Quarter	1	2	3	4	Total
Braves	-	-	-	-	0
Tigers	-	-	-	-	0

at Shell Energy Stadium • Houston, TX

- Date: November 1
- Game time: 2:00 PM CDT
- TV announcers (HBCU Go): James Hadnot (play by play), Jon Kelley (analyst) and Lawrencia Moten (sideline reporter)

Statistics	ALCN	TXSO
First downs		
Total yards		
Rushing yards		
Passing yards		
Passing: Comp–Att–Int		
Time of possession		

Team	Category	Player	Statistics
Alcorn State	Passing		
Alcorn State	Rushing		
Alcorn State	Receiving		
Texas Southern	Passing		
Texas Southern	Rushing		
Texas Southern	Receiving		

=== at Alabama State ===
Texas Southern Tigers (4-4) vs. Alabama State Hornets (6-2) – Game summary

Quarter	1	2	3	4	Total
Tigers	-	-	-	-	0
Hornets	-	-	-	-	0

at ASU Stadium • Montgomery, AL

- Date: November 8
- Game time: 2:00 PM CST
- TV announcers (SWAC TV): Santoria Black (play by play), Stan Becton (analyst) and Faith Daniels (sideline reporter)

Statistics	TXSO	ALST
First downs		
Total yards		
Rushing yards		
Passing yards		
Passing: Comp–Att–Int		
Time of possession		

Team	Category	Player	Statistics
Texas Southern	Passing		
Texas Southern	Rushing		
Texas Southern	Receiving		
Alabama State	Passing		
Alabama State	Rushing		
Alabama State	Receiving		

=== at Southern ===
Texas Southern Tigers (0-0) vs. Southern Jaguars (0-0) – Game summary

Quarter	1	2	3	4	Total
Tigers	-	-	-	-	0
Jaguars	-	-	-	-	0

at A. W. Mumford Stadium • Baton Rouge, LA

- Date: November 15
- Game time: 2:00 PM CST
- TV announcers (SWAC TV): Butch Alsandor (play by play) and Jorge Vargas (analyst)

Statistics	TXSO	SOU
First downs		
Total yards		
Rushing yards		
Passing yards		
Passing: Comp–Att–Int		
Time of possession		

Team	Category	Player	Statistics
Texas Southern	Passing		
Texas Southern	Rushing		
Texas Southern	Receiving		
Southern	Passing		
Southern	Rushing		
Southern	Receiving		

=== Alabama A&M ===
Alabama A&M Bulldogs (0-0) vs. Texas Southern Tigers (0-0) – Game summary

Quarter	1	2	3	4	Total
Bulldogs	-	-	-	-	0
Tigers	-	-	-	-	0

at Shell Energy Stadium • Houston, TX

- Date: November 22
- Game time: 2:00 PM CST
- TV announcers (HBCU Go): James Hadnot (play by play), Jon Kelley (analyst) and Lawrencia Moten (sideline reporter)

Statistics	AAMU	TXSO
First downs		
Total yards		
Rushing yards		
Passing yards		
Passing: Comp–Att–Int		
Time of possession		

Team	Category	Player	Statistics
Alabama A&M	Passing		
Alabama A&M	Rushing		
Alabama A&M	Receiving		
Texas Southern	Passing		
Texas Southern	Rushing		
Texas Southern	Receiving		
