= 2025 Arkansas–Pine Bluff Golden Lions football team =

American college football season

2025 Arkansas–Pine Bluff Golden Lions football
- Conference: Southwestern Athletic Conference
- West Division
- Record: 4–8 (2–6 SWAC)
- Head coach: Alonzo Hampton (3rd season)
- Offensive coordinator: Tony Hull (2nd season)
- Offensive scheme: Spread option
- Defensive coordinator: Jeff Burrow (1st season)
- Base defense: 4–2–5
- Home stadium: Simmons Bank Field

2025 Southwestern Athletic Conference football standings
	Conf.			Overall
Team	W		L	W		L
East Division
Jackson State xy	7	–	1	9	–	3
Alabama State x	7	–	1	10	–	2
Bethune–Cookman	5	–	3	6	–	6
Florida A&M	4	–	4	5	–	7
Alabama A&M	1	–	7	4	–	8
Mississippi Valley State*	1	–	7	2	–	10
West Division
Prairie View A&M xy$	7	–	1	10	–	4
Texas Southern	5	–	3	6	–	5
Alcorn State	4	–	4	5	–	7
Grambling State	4	–	4	7	–	5
Arkansas–Pine Bluff*	2	–	6	4	–	8
Southern	1	–	7	2	–	10
Championship: Prairie View A&M 23, Jackson State 21
$ – Conference champion; x – Division champion/co-champions; y – Championship game participant; * – Ineligible for FCS postseason play due to failed academic requirements; Rankings from STATS Poll

The 2025 Arkansas–Pine Bluff Golden Lions football team represented the University of Arkansas at Pine Bluff (UAPB) as a member of the Southwestern Athletic Conference (SWAC) during the 2025 NCAA Division I FCS football season. The Golden Lions were led by third-year head coach Alonzo Hampton and played home games at Simmons Bank Field in Pine Bluff, Arkansas.

The Golden Lions were ineligible for FCS postseason play due to an insufficient Academic Progress Rate.

== Schedule ==
Date	Time	Opponent	Site	TV	Result	Attendance
August 30	6:30 p.m.	at No. 23 (FBS) Texas Tech*	Jones AT&T Stadium; Lubbock, TX	ESPN+	L 7–67	60,229
September 6	6:00 p.m.	at Central Arkansas*	Estes Stadium; Conway, AR	ESPN+	L 17–41	9,279
September 13	5:00 p.m.	Lincoln (CA)*	Simmons Bank Field; Pine Bluff, AR	SWAC TV	W 34–8	7,542
September 27	6:00 p.m.	vs. Alcorn State	Simmons Bank Liberty Stadium; Memphis, TN (Southern Heritage Classic)	theGrio	W 24–20	21,442
October 4	6:00 p.m.	at Texas Southern	Husky Stadium; Houston, TX	SWAC TV	L 7–51	4,007
October 11	2:00 p.m.	Westgate Christian*^{†}	Simmons Bank Field; Pine Bluff, AR	SWAC TV	W 79–10	11,453
October 18	2:00 p.m.	Grambling State	Simmons Bank Field; Pine Bluff, AR	SWAC TV	L 16–20	6,257
October 25	2:00 p.m.	at Bethune–Cookman	Daytona Stadium; Daytona Beach, FL	SWAC TV	L 14–31	9,850
November 1	2:00 p.m.	Southern	Simmons Bank Field; Pine Bluff, AR	SWAC TV	W 40–21	6,245
November 8	2:00 p.m.	Florida A&M	Simmons Bank Field; Pine Bluff, AR	HBCU Go	L 28–32	6,582
November 15	2:00 p.m.	at Prairie View A&M	Panther Stadium; Prairie View, TX	SWAC TV	L 9–56	7,069
November 22	12:00 p.m.	at Alabama State	ASU Stadium; Montgomery, AL	theGrio	L 13–44	19,372
*Non-conference game; ^{†}Homecoming; Rankings from STATS Poll released prior to the game; All times are in Central time

== Game summaries ==
=== at No. 23 (FBS) Texas Tech ===
Arkansas–Pine Bluff Golden Lions (0–0) at No. 23 (FBS) Texas Tech Red Raiders (0–0) – Game summary

Quarter	1	2	3	4	Total
Golden Lions	0	0	0	7	7
No. (FBS) 23 Red Raiders	23	24	14	6	67

at Jones AT&T Stadium, Lubbock, Texas

- Date: August 30
- Game time: 6:30 p.m. CDT
- Game weather: Cloudy, 83 °F (28 °C)
- Game attendance: 60,229
- Referee: Dan Scanlan
- TV announcers (ESPN+): Ted Emrich and Jeff Woody
- Box score

Game information
First quarter
- TTU – Reggie Virgil 9-yard pass from Behren Morton (Stone Harrington kick), 11:44. Red Raiders 7–0. Drive: 4 plays, 39 yards, 1:07.
- TTU – Terrance Carter Jr. 21-yard pass from Behren Morton (Stone Harrington kick), 10:12. Red Raiders 14–0. Drive: 1 play, 21 yards, 0:07.
- TTU – Upton Bellenfant 29-yard field goal, 4:47. Red Raiders 17–0. Drive: 8 plays, 61 yards, 3:07.
- TTU – Terrance Carter Jr. 9-yard pass from Behren Morton (run failed), 2:15. Red Raiders 23–0. Drive: 6 plays, 28 yards, 2:14.

Second quarter

- TTU – Coy Eakin 41-yard pass from Behren Morton (Stone Harrington kick), 13:58. Red Raiders 30–0. Drive: 5 plays, 70 yards, 1:08.
- TTU – J'Koby Williams 5-yard run (Stone Harrington kick), 8:56. Red Raiders 37–0. Drive: 8 plays, 80 yards, 3:06.
- TTU – Stone Harrington 31-yard field goal, 4:49. Red Raiders 40–0. Drive: 7 plays, 43 yards, 2:12.
- TTU – Cameron Dickey 2-yard run (Ian Hershey kick), 1:21. Red Raiders 47–0. Drive: 4 plays, 51 yards, 0:54.

Third quarter

- TTU – Will Hammond 64-yard run (Upton Bellenfant kick), 6:28. Red Raiders 54–0. Drive: 5 plays, 80 yards, 1:23.
- TTU – Leyton Stone 9-yard pass from Will Hammond (Stone Harrington kick), 3:00. Red Raiders 61–0. Drive: 5 plays, 68 yards, 1:47.

Fourth quarter

- UAPB – Ellis Stewart 7-yard pass from Christian Peters (Trey Glymph kick), 6:16. Red Raiders 61–7. Drive: 12 plays, 75 yards, 11:44.
- TTU – Bryson Jones 13-yard pass from Mitch Griffis (kick failed), 3:20. Red Raiders 67–7. Drive: 7 plays, 85 yards, 2:41.

Statistics	UAPB	TTU
First downs	11	33
Plays–yards	59–175	61–608
Rushes–yards	26–53	29–294
Passing yards	122	314
Passing: comp–att–int	17–33–1	25–32–0
Turnovers	1	0
Time of possession	32:38	27:22

Team	Category	Player	Statistics
Arkansas–Pine Bluff	Passing	Christian Peters	17/33, 123 yards, TD, INT
Arkansas–Pine Bluff	Rushing	Za'Marion Webber	15 carries, 42 yards
Arkansas–Pine Bluff	Receiving	Kareem Burke	3 receptions, 33 yards
Texas Tech	Passing	Behren Morton	16/18, 201 yards, 4 TD
Texas Tech	Rushing	Cameron Dickey	12 carries, 90 yards, TD
Texas Tech	Receiving	Reggie Virgil	4 receptions, 56 yards, TD

The game was suspended at halftime due to a thunderstorm entering Lubbock. Once play resumed, the second half was played with two, eight-minute quarters.

=== at Central Arkansas ===
Arkansas–Pine Bluff Golden Lions (0–1) at Central Arkansas Bears (0–1) – Game summary

Quarter	1	2	3	4	Total
Golden Lions	7	3	0	7	17
Bears	6	14	7	14	41

at Estes Stadium, Conway, Arkansas

- Date: September 6
- Game time: 6:00 p.m. CDT
- Game weather: Sunny
- Game attendance: 9,279
- Referee: Matt Jones
- TV announcers (ESPN+): Dylan McLemore (play-by-play) and Wess Moore (analyst)

Statistics	UAPB	CARK
First downs		
Total yards		
Rushing yards		
Passing yards		
Turnovers		
Time of possession		

Team	Category	Player	Statistics
Arkansas–Pine Bluff	Passing		
Arkansas–Pine Bluff	Rushing		
Arkansas–Pine Bluff	Receiving		
Central Arkansas	Passing		
Central Arkansas	Rushing		
Central Arkansas	Receiving		

=== Lincoln (CA) ===
Lincoln Oaklanders (Ind) (0–2) at Arkansas–Pine Bluff Golden Lions (0–2) – Game summary

Quarter	1	2	3	4	Total
Oaklanders (Ind)	0	8	0	0	8
Golden Lions	13	0	7	14	34

at Simmons Bank Field, Pine Bluff, Arkansas

- Date: September 13
- Game time: 5:00 p.m. CDT
- Game weather: Sunny • Temperature: 96 °F (36 °C) • Wind: N at 3 miles per hour (4.8 km/h)
- Game attendance: 7,542
- TV announcers (SWAC TV): LaRon Marbley (play by play) and Brian Davis (analyst)

Statistics	LCLN	UAPB
First downs		
Total yards		
Rushing yards		
Passing yards		
Turnovers		
Time of possession		

Team	Category	Player	Statistics
Lincoln (CA)	Passing		
Lincoln (CA)	Rushing		
Lincoln (CA)	Receiving		
Arkansas–Pine Bluff	Passing		
Arkansas–Pine Bluff	Rushing		
Arkansas–Pine Bluff	Receiving		

=== vs. Alcorn State ===
36th Annual Southern Heritage Classic
Arkansas–Pine Bluff Golden Lions (1–2) vs. Alcorn State Braves (0–3) – Game summary

Quarter	1	2	3	4	Total
Braves	6	7	7	0	20
Golden Lions	3	14	0	7	24

at Simmons Bank Liberty Stadium, Memphis, Tennessee

- Date: September 27
- Game time: 6:00 p.m. CDT
- Game weather: Sunny • Temperature: 83 °F (28 °C) • Wind: N at 6 miles per hour (9.7 km/h)
- Game attendance: 21,442
- Referee: Greg Morgan
- TV announcers (theGrio): Tolly Carr (play-by-play), Steve Wyche (analyst) and Nia Symone (sideline)

Statistics	ALCN	UAPB
First downs		
Total yards		
Rushing yards		
Passing yards		
Turnovers		
Time of possession		

Team	Category	Player	Statistics
Alcorn State	Passing		
Alcorn State	Rushing		
Alcorn State	Receiving		
Arkansas–Pine Bluff	Passing		
Arkansas–Pine Bluff	Rushing		
Arkansas–Pine Bluff	Receiving		

=== at Texas Southern ===
Arkansas–Pine Bluff Golden Lions (2–2) at Texas Southern Tigers (1–3) – Game summary

Quarter	1	2	3	4	Total
Golden Lions	0	0	0	7	7
Tigers	3	24	17	7	51

at Husky Stadium, Houston, Texas

- Date: October 4
- Game time: 6:00 p.m. CDT
- Game weather: Sunny • Temperature: 87 °F (31 °C) • Wind: N at 14 miles per hour (23 km/h)
- Referee: Jarvis Walker
- TV announcers (SWAC TV): Butch Alsandor (play-by-play) and Jorge Vargas (analyst)

Statistics	UAPB	TXSO
First downs		
Total yards		
Rushing yards		
Passing yards		
Turnovers		
Time of possession		

Team	Category	Player	Statistics
Arkansas–Pine Bluff	Passing		
Arkansas–Pine Bluff	Rushing		
Arkansas–Pine Bluff	Receiving		
Texas Southern	Passing		
Texas Southern	Rushing		
Texas Southern	Receiving		

=== Westgate Christian ===
Westgate Christian Ravens at Arkansas–Pine Bluff Golden Lions – Game summary

Quarter	1	2	3	4	Total
Ravens	7	3	0	0	10
Golden Lions	35	16	21	7	79

at Simmons Bank Field, Pine Bluff, Arkansas

- Date: October 11
- Game time: 2:00 p.m. CDT
- Game weather: Sunny • Temperature: 82 °F (28 °C) • Wind: NE at 5 miles per hour (8.0 km/h)
- Game attendance: 11,453
- TV announcers (SWAC TV): LaRon Marbley (play-by-play) and Carlos James (analyst)

Statistics	WGCU	UAPB
First downs		
Total yards		
Rushing yards		
Passing yards		
Turnovers		
Time of possession		

Team	Category	Player	Statistics
Westgate Christian	Passing		
Westgate Christian	Rushing		
Westgate Christian	Receiving		
Arkansas–Pine Bluff	Passing		
Arkansas–Pine Bluff	Rushing		
Arkansas–Pine Bluff	Receiving		

=== Grambling State ===
Grambling State Tigers (3–3) at Arkansas–Pine Bluff Golden Lions (3–3) – Game summary

Quarter	1	2	3	4	Total
Tigers	0	7	7	6	20
Golden Lions	7	0	0	9	16

at Simmons Bank Field, Pine Bluff, Arkansas

- Date: October 18
- Game time: 2:00 p.m. CDT
- Game weather: Cloudy • Temperature: 85 °F (29 °C) • Wind: S at 10 miles per hour (16 km/h)
- Game attendance: 6,257
- TV announcers (SWAC TV): LaRon Marbley (play-by-play) and Carlos James (analyst)

Statistics	GRAM	UAPB
First downs		
Total yards		
Rushing yards		
Passing yards		
Turnovers		
Time of possession		

Team	Category	Player	Statistics
Grambling State	Passing		
Grambling State	Rushing		
Grambling State	Receiving		
Arkansas–Pine Bluff	Passing		
Arkansas–Pine Bluff	Rushing		
Arkansas–Pine Bluff	Receiving		

=== at Bethune–Cookman ===
Arkansas–Pine Bluff Golden Lions (3–4) at Bethune–Cookman Wildcats (3–4) – Game summary

Quarter	1	2	3	4	Total
Golden Lions	0	7	7	0	14
Wildcats	7	7	14	3	31

at Daytona Stadium, Daytona Beach, Florida

- Date: October 25
- Game time: 2:00 p.m. CDT
- Game weather: Sunny • Temperature: 80 °F (27 °C) • Wind: E at 14 miles per hour (23 km/h)
- Game attendance: 9,850
- Referee: Ivan Daniels
- TV announcers (SWAC TV): Kenny Schierlinger (play-by-play) and Messod Bendayan (analyst)

Statistics	UAPB	BCU
First downs		
Total yards		
Rushing yards		
Passing yards		
Turnovers		
Time of possession		

Team	Category	Player	Statistics
Arkansas–Pine Bluff	Passing		
Arkansas–Pine Bluff	Rushing		
Arkansas–Pine Bluff	Receiving		
Bethune–Cookman	Passing		
Bethune–Cookman	Rushing		
Bethune–Cookman	Receiving		

=== Southern ===
Southern Jaguars (1–7) at Arkansas–Pine Bluff Golden Lions (3–5) – Game summary

Quarter	1	2	3	4	Total
Jaguars	0	7	7	7	21
Golden Lions	7	17	14	2	40

at Simmons Bank Field, Pine Bluff, Arkansas

- Date: November 1
- Game time: 2:00 p.m. CDT
- TV announcers (SWAC TV): LaRon Marbley (play by play) and Carlos James (analyst)

Statistics	SOU	UAPB
First downs		
Total yards		
Rushing yards		
Passing yards		
Turnovers		
Time of possession		

Team	Category	Player	Statistics
Southern	Passing		
Southern	Rushing		
Southern	Receiving		
Arkansas–Pine Bluff	Passing		
Arkansas–Pine Bluff	Rushing		
Arkansas–Pine Bluff	Receiving		

=== Florida A&M ===
Florida A&M Rattlers (3–5) at Arkansas–Pine Bluff Golden Lions (4–5) – Game summary

Quarter	1	2	Total
Rattlers			0
Golden Lions			0

at Simmons Bank Field, Pine Bluff, Arkansas

- Date: November 8
- Game time: 2:00 p.m. CDT
- TV announcers (HBCU Go): James Hadnot (play by play), Steve Wyche (analyst) and Lawrencia Moten (sideline reporter)

Statistics	FAMU	UAPB
First downs		
Total yards		
Rushing yards		
Passing yards		
Turnovers		
Time of possession		

Team	Category	Player	Statistics
Florida A&M	Passing		
Florida A&M	Rushing		
Florida A&M	Receiving		
Arkansas–Pine Bluff	Passing		
Arkansas–Pine Bluff	Rushing		
Arkansas–Pine Bluff	Receiving		

=== at Prairie View A&M ===
Arkansas–Pine Bluff Golden Lions at Prairie View A&M Panthers – Game summary

Quarter	1	2	Total
Golden Lions			0
Panthers			0

at Panther Stadium, Prairie View, TX

- Date: November 15
- TV announcers (SWAC TV): Jay Holloway (play by play) and Ossie Clark (analyst)

Statistics	UAPB	PV
First downs		
Total yards		
Rushing yards		
Passing yards		
Turnovers		
Time of possession		

Team	Category	Player	Statistics
Arkansas–Pine Bluff	Passing		
Arkansas–Pine Bluff	Rushing		
Arkansas–Pine Bluff	Receiving		
Prairie View A&M	Passing		
Prairie View A&M	Rushing		
Prairie View A&M	Receiving		

=== at Alabama State ===
Arkansas–Pine Bluff Golden Lions at Alabama State Hornets – Game summary

Quarter	1	2	Total
Golden Lions			0
Hornets			0

at ASU Stadium, Montgomery, AL

- Date: November 22
- Game time: 12:00 p.m. CDT
- TV announcers (TheGrio): Derrin Horton (play by play), Steve Wyche (analyst) and Nia Symone (sideline reporter)

Statistics	UAPB	ALST
First downs		
Total yards		
Rushing yards		
Passing yards		
Turnovers		
Time of possession		

Team	Category	Player	Statistics
Arkansas–Pine Bluff	Passing		
Arkansas–Pine Bluff	Rushing		
Arkansas–Pine Bluff	Receiving		
Alabama State	Passing		
Alabama State	Rushing		
Alabama State	Receiving		
