= 2025 Florida A&M Rattlers football team =

American college football season

2025 Florida A&M Rattlers football
- Conference: Southwestern Athletic Conference
- East Division
- Record: 5–7 (4–4 SWAC)
- Head coach: James Colzie III (2nd season)
- Co-offensive coordinators: Henry Burris (2nd season); Cedric Williams (1st season)
- Offensive scheme: Spread
- Defensive coordinator: Kenwick Thompson (1st season)
- Base defense: 3–4
- Home stadium: Bragg Memorial Stadium

2025 Southwestern Athletic Conference football standings
	Conf.			Overall
Team	W		L	W		L
East Division
Jackson State xy	7	–	1	9	–	3
Alabama State x	7	–	1	10	–	2
Bethune–Cookman	5	–	3	6	–	6
Florida A&M	4	–	4	5	–	7
Alabama A&M	1	–	7	4	–	8
Mississippi Valley State*	1	–	7	2	–	10
West Division
Prairie View A&M xy$	7	–	1	10	–	4
Texas Southern	5	–	3	6	–	5
Alcorn State	4	–	4	5	–	7
Grambling State	4	–	4	7	–	5
Arkansas–Pine Bluff*	2	–	6	4	–	8
Southern	1	–	7	2	–	10
Championship: Prairie View A&M 23, Jackson State 21
$ – Conference champion; x – Division champion/co-champions; y – Championship game participant; * – Ineligible for FCS postseason play due to failed academic requirements; Rankings from STATS Poll

The 2025 Florida A&M Rattlers football team represented Florida A&M University as a member of the Southwestern Athletic Conference (SWAC) during the 2025 NCAA Division I FCS football season. The Rattlers were led by second-year head coach James Colzie III and played home games at Bragg Memorial Stadium in Tallahassee, Florida.

The Florida A&M Rattlers drew an average home attendance of 14,093, the 12th-highest of all NCAA Division I FCS football teams.

== Schedule ==
Date	Time	Opponent	Site	TV	Result	Attendance
August 30	4:00 p.m.	vs. Howard*	Hard Rock Stadium; Miami Gardens, FL (Orange Blossom Classic)	ESPNU	L 9–10	22,455
September 6	6:00 p.m.	at Florida Atlantic*	Flagler Credit Union Stadium; Boca Raton, FL	ESPN+	L 14–56	21,029
September 13	7:00 p.m.	Albany State*	Bragg Memorial Stadium; Tallahassee, FL	SWAC TV	W 33–25	14,370
September 27	3:00 p.m.	Alabama State	Bragg Memorial Stadium; Tallahassee, FL	HBCU Go	L 14–42	13,515
October 11	3:00 p.m.	North Carolina Central*	Bragg Memorial Stadium; Tallahassee, FL	HBCU Go	L 7–45	10,012
October 18	4:00 p.m.	Alcorn State	Bragg Memorial Stadium; Tallahassee, FL	ESPN+	W 33–28	
October 25	5:00 p.m.	at Southern	A. W. Mumford Stadium; Baton Rouge, LA	SWAC TV	W 43–35	17,180
November 1	7:00 p.m.	No. 23 Jackson State	Bragg Memorial Stadium; Tallahassee, FL	ESPN+	L 16–41	13,104
November 8	3:00 p.m.	at Arkansas–Pine Bluff	Simmons Bank Field; Pine Bluff, AR	HBCU Go	W 31–28	6,582
November 15	3:00 p.m.	at Alabama A&M	Louis Crews Stadium; Huntsville, AL	SWAC TV	W 26–23	14,677
November 22	3:30 p.m.	vs. Bethune–Cookman	Camping World Stadium; Orlando, FL (Florida Classic)	ESPN+	L 34–38	55,528
November 29 (Note: Florida A&M's neutral game against Mississippi Valley State was originally scheduled to be played on October 4 at the Mercedes-Benz Stadium in Atlanta, Georgia, but the game was moved to November 29, 2025 and will be played as an away game.)	3:00 p.m.	at Mississippi Valley State	Rice–Totten Stadium; Itta Bena, MS	SWAC TV	L 31–35	2,105
*Non-conference game; Rankings from STATS Poll released prior to the game; All times are in Eastern time

== Game summaries ==
=== vs. Howard (Orange Blossom Classic) ===
Howard Bison (0-0) vs. Florida A&M Rattlers (0-0) – Game summary

Quarter	1	2	3	4	Total
Bison	0	7	0	3	10
Rattlers	0	3	0	6	9

at Hard Rock Stadium • Miami Gardens, Florida

- Date: August 30
- Game time: 4:00 PM EDT
- Game weather: Cloudy • Temperature: 84 °F (29 °C) • Wind: E at 6 miles per hour (9.7 km/h)
- Game attendance: 22,455
- Referee: Eric Bluntson
- TV announcers (ESPNU): Tiffany Greene (play-by-play) and Jay Walker (analyst)
- Box score, Recap

Game information

First Quarter

- No scoring plays

Second Quarter

- HOW – C. J. Neely 2-yard 2-yard pass from Tyriq Starks (Matt Conord kick), 10:31. Bison 7–0. Drive: 10 plays, 53 yards, 4:49.
- FAMU – Daniel Porto 37-yard field goal, 2:03. Bison 7–3. Drive: 7 plays, 34 yards, 2:35.

Third Quarter

- No scoring plays

Fourth Quarter

- FAMU – Daniel Porto 33-yard field goal, 7:46. Bison 7–6. Drive: 12 plays, 29 yards, 7:37.
- FAMU – Daniel Porto 18-yard field goal, 1:49. Rattlers 9–7. Drive: 11 plays, 61 yards, 4:13.
- HOW – Matt Conord 43-yard field goal, 0:00. Bison 10–9. Drive: 10 plays, 49 yards, 1:49.

Statistics	HOW	FAMU
First downs	12	15
Total yards	195	272
Rushing yards	50	89
Passing yards	145	183
Passing: Comp–Att–Int	17–29–1	17–33–0
Time of possession	26:24	33:36

Team	Category	Player	Statistics
Howard	Passing	Tyriq Starks	17/28, 145 yards, TD, INT
Howard	Rushing	Tyriq Starks	12 rushes, 30 yards
Howard	Receiving	K. D. Mosley	3 receptions, 33 yards
Florida A&M	Passing	R. J. Johnson III	17/32, 183 yards
Florida A&M	Rushing	Levontai Summersett	9 rushes, 37 yards
Florida A&M	Receiving	Jalen Rogers	4 receptions, 51 yards

=== at Florida Atlantic (FBS) ===
Florida A&M Rattlers (0–1) at Florida Atlantic Owls (FBS) (0–1) – Game summary

Quarter	1	2	3	4	Total
Rattlers	0	0	7	7	14
Owls (FBS)	22	17	0	17	56

at Flagler Credit Union Stadium • Boca Raton, Florida

- Date: September 6
- Game time: 6:00 p.m. EDT
- Game weather: Cloudy • Temperature: 88 °F (31 °C) • Wind: S at 6 miles per hour (9.7 km/h)
- Game attendance: 21,029
- Referee: Reid Jackson
- TV announcers (ESPN+): AJ Ricketts (play-by-play) and Patrick Murray (analyst)

Game information

First quarter

- (11:15) FAU – Dominique Henry 24-yard pass from Caden Veltkamp, Jackson Lee pass (Drive: 7 plays, 76 yards, 2:36; Florida Atlantic 8–0)
- (7:09) FAU – Lawrence Johnson 0-yard blocked punt return, Garrison Smith kick (Florida Atlantic 15–0)
- (2:37) FAU – Asaad Waseem 12-yard pass from Caden Veltkamp, Garrison Smith kick (Drive: 8 plays, 67 yards, 2:36; Florida Atlantic 22–0)

Second quarter

- (10:17) FAU – Jayshon Platt 14-yard pass from Caden Veltkamp, Garrison Smith kick (Drive: 9 plays, 64 yards, 4:28; Florida Atlantic 29–0)
- (7:26) FAU – Dominique Henry 3-yard pass from Caden Veltkamp, Garrison Smith kick (Drive: 6 plays, 54 yards, 1:57; Florida Atlantic 36–0)
- (3:18) FAU – Garrison Smith 29-yard field goal (Drive: 10 plays, 55 yards, 3:13; Florida Atlantic 39–0)

Third quarter

- (8:57) FAMU – Jamar Taylor 27-yard pass from RJ Johnson III, Daniel Porto kick (Drive: 7 plays, 85 yards, 3:29; Florida Atlantic 39–7)

Fourth quarter

- (12:22) FAU – Asaad Waseem 0-yard fumble recovery, Garrison Smith kick (Drive: 12 plays, 86 yards, 3:48; Florida Atlantic 46–7)
- (10:23) FAMU – Jordan Edwards 65-yard pass from RJ Johnson III, Daniel Porto kick (Drive: 4 plays, 75 yards, 1:59; Florida Atlantic 46–14)
- (7:09) FAU – Kadon Shields-Dutton 1-yard run, Garrison Smith kick (Drive: 8 plays, 68 yards, 3:06; Florida Atlantic 53–14)
- (3:53) FAU – Garrison Smith 48-yard field goal (Drive: 6 plays, 36 yards, 1:29; Florida Atlantic 56–14)

Statistics	FAMU	FAU
First downs	16	34
Plays–yards	64–297	79–553
Rushes–yards	29–70	34–193
Passing yards	227	360
Passing: comp–att–int	19–35–0	29–45–0
Turnovers	0	0
Time of possession	30:15	29:45

Team	Category	Player	Statistics
Florida A&M	Passing	RJ Johnson III	18/28, 222 yards, 2 TD
Florida A&M	Rushing	Thad Franklin Jr.	11 carries, 58 yards
Florida A&M	Receiving	Jordan Edwards	2 receptions, 72 yards, TD
Florida Atlantic	Passing	Caden Veltkamp	27/39, 309 yards, 5 TD
Florida Atlantic	Rushing	Gemari Sands	10 carries, 83 yards
Florida Atlantic	Receiving	Easton Messer	4 receptions, 62 yards

=== Albany State (DII) ===
Albany State Golden Rams (DII) (2-0) at Florida A&M Rattlers (0-2) – Game summary

Quarter	1	2	3	4	Total
Golden Rams (DII)	6	8	3	8	25
Rattlers	3	7	16	7	33

at Bragg Memorial Stadium • Tallahassee, FL

- Date: September 13
- Game time: 7:00 PM EDT
- Game weather: Sunny
- Game attendance: 14,370
- TV announcers (SWAC TV): Jared Oliver (play by play) and Stan Becton (analyst)

Game information

First Quarter

- (9:32) ALBS – Tiant Wyche 1-yard run (Drive: 11 plays, 77 yards, 5:23; Albany State 6–0)
- (7:03) FAMU – Daniel Porto 48-yard field goal (Drive: 6 plays, 42 yards, 2:25; Albany State 6–3)

Second Quarter

- (12:21) ALBS – Aljhanod Thomas 10-yard run, Xavier Herndon (Drive: 4 plays, 59 yards, 0:59; Albany State 14–3)
- (5:13) FAMU – Thad Franklin Jr. 4-yard run, Daniel Porto kick (Drive: 13 plays, 67 yards, 7:00; Albany State 14–10)

Third Quarter

- (14:42) FAMU – Kenari Wilcher 71-yard pass from RJ Johnson III, Daniel Porto kick (Drive: 1 play, 71 yards, 0:11; Florida A&M 17–14)
- (12:03) FAMU – Jamal Hailey 12-yard pass from RJ Johnson III (Drive: 5 plays, 36 yards, 2:31; Florida A&M 23–14)
- (8:01) ALBS – Kyle Wright 38-yard field goal (Drive: 9 plays, 39 yards, 4:02; Florida A&M 23–17)
- (5:00) FAMU – Daniel Porto 23-yard field goal (Drive: 10 plays, 69 yards, 3:01; Florida A&M 26–17)

Fourth Quarter

- (7:24) FAMU – Thad Franklin Jr. 5-yard run, Daniel Porto kick (Drive: 18 plays, 99 yards, 10:35; Florida A&M 33–17)
- (4:24) ALBS – Jamill Williams 25-yard pass from Isaiah Knowles, Javion Jackson pass (Drive: 8 plays, 65 yards, 2:48; Florida A&M 33–25)

Statistics	ALBS	FAMU
First downs	21	26
Total yards	321	462
Rushing yards	120	91
Passing yards	201	371
Passing: Comp–Att–Int	17–31–0	26–36–1
Time of possession	25:02	34:58

Team	Category	Player	Statistics
Albany State	Passing	Isaiah Knowles	17/31, 201 yards, TD
Albany State	Rushing	Aljhanod Thomas	9 carries, 52 yards, TD
Albany State	Receiving	Jamill Williams	5 receptions, 74 yards, TD
Florida A&M	Passing	RJ Johnson III	17/22, 272 yards, 2 TD
Florida A&M	Rushing	Thad Franklin Jr.	15 carries, 76 yards, 2 TD
Florida A&M	Receiving	Kenari Wilcher	5 receptions, 121 yards, TD

=== Alabama State ===
Alabama State Hornets (2-1) at Florida A&M Rattlers (1-2) – Game summary

Quarter	1	2	3	4	Total
Hornets	7	7	14	14	42
Rattlers	0	6	0	8	14

at Bragg Memorial Stadium • Tallahassee, FL

- Date: September 27
- Game time: 3:00 PM EDT
- TV announcers (HBCU Go): James Hadnot (play by play), Jon Kelley (analyst) and Lawrencia Moten (sideline reporter)

Statistics	ALST	FAMU
First downs		
Total yards		
Rushing yards		
Passing yards		
Passing: Comp–Att–Int		
Time of possession		

Team	Category	Player	Statistics
Alabama State	Passing		
Alabama State	Rushing		
Alabama State	Receiving		
Florida A&M	Passing		
Florida A&M	Rushing		
Florida A&M	Receiving		

=== North Carolina Central ===
North Carolina Central Eagles (4-2) vs. Florida A&M Rattlers (1-3) – Game summary

Quarter	1	2	3	4	Total
Eagles	7	21	7	10	45
Rattlers	0	0	7	0	7

at Bragg Memorial Stadium • Tallahassee, FL

- Date: October 11
- Game time: 3:00 PM EDT
- TV announcers (HBCU Go): James Hadnot (play by play), Jon Kelley (analyst) and Nicole Hutchison (sideline reporter)

Statistics	NCCU	FAMU
First downs		
Total yards		
Rushing yards		
Passing yards		
Passing: Comp–Att–Int		
Time of possession		

Team	Category	Player	Statistics
North Carolina Central	Passing		
North Carolina Central	Rushing		
North Carolina Central	Receiving		
Florida A&M	Passing		
Florida A&M	Rushing		
Florida A&M	Receiving		

=== Alcorn State ===
Alcorn State Braves (1-5) vs. Florida A&M Rattlers (1-4) – Game summary

Quarter	1	2	3	4	Total
Braves	-	-	-	-	0
Rattlers	-	-	-	-	0

at Bragg Memorial Stadium • Tallahassee, FL

- Date: October 18
- Game time: 4:00 PM EDT
- TV announcers (ESPN+): Tiffany Greene (play by play) and Jay Walker (analyst)

Statistics	ALCN	FAMU
First downs		
Total yards		
Rushing yards		
Passing yards		
Passing: Comp–Att–Int		
Time of possession		

Team	Category	Player	Statistics
Alcorn State	Passing		
Alcorn State	Rushing		
Alcorn State	Receiving		
Florida A&M	Passing		
Florida A&M	Rushing		
Florida A&M	Receiving		

=== at Southern ===
Florida A&M Rattlers (2-4) vs. Southern Jaguars (1-6) – Game summary

Quarter	1	2	3	4	Total
Rattlers	-	-	-	-	0
Jaguars	-	-	-	-	0

at A. W. Mumford Stadium • Baton Rouge, LA

- Date: October 25
- Game time: 4:00 PM CDT
- TV announcers (SWAC TV): Mo Carter (play by play) and Jorge Vargas (analyst)

Statistics	FAMU	SOU
First downs		
Total yards		
Rushing yards		
Passing yards		
Passing: Comp–Att–Int		
Time of possession		

Team	Category	Player	Statistics
Florida A&M	Passing		
Florida A&M	Rushing		
Florida A&M	Receiving		
Southern	Passing		
Southern	Rushing		
Southern	Receiving		

=== No. 23 Jackson State ===
No. 23 Jackson State Tigers (5-2) vs. Florida A&M Rattlers (3-4) – Game summary

Quarter	1	2	3	4	Total
No. 23 Tigers	-	-	-	-	0
Rattlers	-	-	-	-	0

at Bragg Memorial Stadium • Tallahassee, FL

- Date: November 1
- Game time: 7:00 PM EDT
- TV announcers (ESPN+): Tiffany Greene (play by play) and Forrest Conoly (analyst)

Statistics	JKST	FAMU
First downs		
Total yards		
Rushing yards		
Passing yards		
Passing: Comp–Att–Int		
Time of possession		

Team	Category	Player	Statistics
Jackson State	Passing		
Jackson State	Rushing		
Jackson State	Receiving		
Florida A&M	Passing		
Florida A&M	Rushing		
Florida A&M	Receiving		

=== at Arkansas–Pine Bluff ===
Florida A&M Rattlers (3-5) vs. Arkansas–Pine Bluff Golden Lions (4-5) – Game summary

Quarter	1	2	3	4	Total
Rattlers	-	-	-	-	0
Golden Lions	-	-	-	-	0

at Simmons Bank Field • Pine Bluff, AR

- Date: November 8
- Game time: 2:00 PM CST
- TV announcers (HBCU Go): James Hadnot (play by play), Steve Wyche (analyst) and Lawrencia Moten (sideline reporter)

Statistics	FAMU	UAPB
First downs		
Total yards		
Rushing yards		
Passing yards		
Passing: Comp–Att–Int		
Time of possession		

Team	Category	Player	Statistics
Florida A&M	Passing		
Florida A&M	Rushing		
Florida A&M	Receiving		
Arkansas–Pine Bluff	Passing		
Arkansas–Pine Bluff	Rushing		
Arkansas–Pine Bluff	Receiving		

=== at Alabama A&M ===
Florida A&M Rattlers (0-0) vs. Alabama A&M Bulldogs (0-0) – Game summary

Quarter	1	2	3	4	Total
Rattlers	-	-	-	-	0
Bulldogs	-	-	-	-	0

at Louis Crews Stadium • Huntsville, AL

- Date: November 15
- Game time: 2:00 PM CST
- TV announcers (ESPN+): Mo Carter (play by play) and Stan Becton (analyst)

Statistics	FAMU	AAMU
First downs		
Total yards		
Rushing yards		
Passing yards		
Passing: Comp–Att–Int		
Time of possession		

Team	Category	Player	Statistics
Florida A&M	Passing		
Florida A&M	Rushing		
Florida A&M	Receiving		
Alabama A&M	Passing		
Alabama A&M	Rushing		
Alabama A&M	Receiving		

=== vs. Bethune–Cookman (Florida Classic) ===
Florida A&M Rattlers (0-0) vs. Bethune–Cookman Wildcats (0-0) – Game summary

Quarter	1	2	3	4	Total
Rattlers	-	-	-	-	0
Wildcats	-	-	-	-	0

at Camping World Stadium • Orlando, FL

- Date: November 22
- Game time: 3:30 PM EST
- TV announcers (ESPN+): Tiffany Greene (play by play) and Jay Walker (analyst)

Statistics	FAMU	BCU
First downs		
Total yards		
Rushing yards		
Passing yards		
Passing: Comp–Att–Int		
Time of possession		

Team	Category	Player	Statistics
Florida A&M	Passing		
Florida A&M	Rushing		
Florida A&M	Receiving		
Bethune–Cookman	Passing		
Bethune–Cookman	Rushing		
Bethune–Cookman	Receiving		

=== at Mississippi Valley State ===
Florida A&M Rattlers (0-0) vs. Mississippi Valley State Delta Devils (0-0) – Game summary

Quarter	1	2	3	4	Total
Rattlers	-	-	-	-	0
Delta Devils	-	-	-	-	0

at Rice-Totten Stadium • Itta Bena, MS

- Date: November 29
- Game time: 3:00 PM EDT
- TV announcers (SWAC TV): James Verrett (play by play) and Charles Porter (analyst)

Statistics	FAMU	MVSU
First downs		
Total yards		
Rushing yards		
Passing yards		
Passing: Comp–Att–Int		
Time of possession		

Team	Category	Player	Statistics
Florida A&M	Passing		
Florida A&M	Rushing		
Florida A&M	Receiving		
Mississippi Valley State	Passing		
Mississippi Valley State	Rushing		
Mississippi Valley State	Receiving		
