= 2025 Southern Jaguars football team =

American college football season

2025 Southern Jaguars football
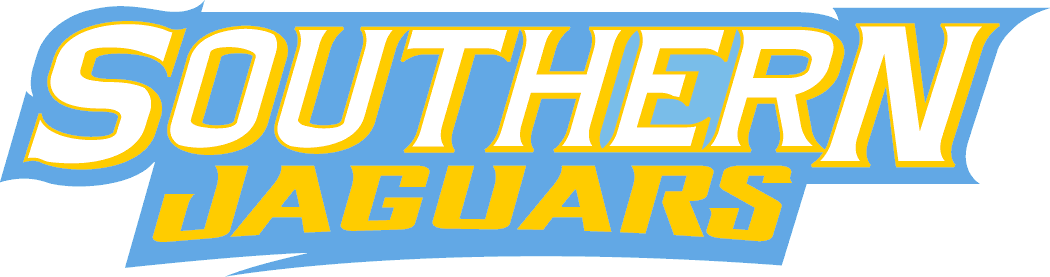
- Conference: Southwestern Athletic Conference
- West Division
- Record: 2–10 (1–7 SWAC)
- Head coach: Terrence Graves (2nd season; first 7 games); Fred McNair (interim; remainder of season)
- Offensive coordinator: Mark Frederick (2nd season)
- Defensive coordinator: Henry Miller (2nd season)
- Home stadium: A. W. Mumford Stadium

2025 Southwestern Athletic Conference football standings
	Conf.			Overall
Team	W		L	W		L
East Division
Jackson State xy	7	–	1	9	–	3
Alabama State x	7	–	1	10	–	2
Bethune–Cookman	5	–	3	6	–	6
Florida A&M	4	–	4	5	–	7
Alabama A&M	1	–	7	4	–	8
Mississippi Valley State*	1	–	7	2	–	10
West Division
Prairie View A&M xy$	7	–	1	10	–	4
Texas Southern	5	–	3	6	–	5
Alcorn State	4	–	4	5	–	7
Grambling State	4	–	4	7	–	5
Arkansas–Pine Bluff*	2	–	6	4	–	8
Southern	1	–	7	2	–	10
Championship: Prairie View A&M 23, Jackson State 21
$ – Conference champion; x – Division champion/co-champions; y – Championship game participant; * – Ineligible for FCS postseason play due to failed academic requirements; Rankings from STATS Poll

The 2025 Southern Jaguars football team represented Southern University as a member of the Southwestern Athletic Conference (SWAC) during the 2025 NCAA Division I FCS football season and played at the A. W. Mumford Stadium in Baton Rouge, Louisiana.

The Jaguars were led by second-year head coach Terrence Graves for the first seven games of the season until he was fired on October 20, 2025. Quarterbacks coach Fred McNair, formerly the head coach at conference foe Alcorn State, was named interim head coach for the rest of the season.

== Schedule ==
Date	Time	Opponent	Site	TV	Result	Attendance
August 23	6:30 p.m.	vs. North Carolina Central*	Center Parc Stadium; Atlanta, GA (MEAC/SWAC Challenge)	ABC/ESPN+	L 14–31	16,191
August 30	4:00 p.m.	at Mississippi Valley State (Note: The games against Alabama State and Mississippi Valley State, fellow members of the SWAC, are non-conference games and do not count in the league standings.)*	Rice–Totten Stadium; Itta Bena, MS	SWAC TV	W 34–29	3,748
September 6	6:00 p.m.	Alabama State*	A. W. Mumford Stadium; Baton Rouge, LA	ESPN+	L 7–30	17,195
September 13	9:00 p.m.	at Fresno State*	Valley Children's Stadium; Fresno, CA	KGPE	L 7–56	37,210
September 27	6:00 p.m.	No. 19 Jackson State	A. W. Mumford Stadium; Baton Rouge, LA (rivalry)	ESPN+	L 13–38	27,487
October 11	2:00 p.m.	at Bethune–Cookman	Daytona Stadium; Daytona Beach, FL	SWAC TV	L 14–46	5,257
October 18	4:00 p.m.	Prairie View A&M^{†}	A. W. Mumford Stadium; Baton Rouge, LA	HBCU Go	L 3–24	23,715
October 25	4:00 p.m.	Florida A&M	A. W. Mumford Stadium; Baton Rouge, LA	SWAC TV	L 35–43	17,180
November 1	2:00 p.m.	at Arkansas–Pine Bluff	Simmons Bank Field; Pine Bluff, AR	SWAC TV	L 21–40	6,245
November 8	3:00 p.m.	at Alcorn State	Casem-Spinks Stadium; Lorman, MS	ESPN+	L 17–35	14,458
November 15	2:00 p.m.	Texas Southern	A. W. Mumford Stadium; Baton Rouge, LA	SWAC TV	L 30–35	24,679
November 29	1:00 p.m.	vs. Grambling State	Caesars Superdome; New Orleans, LA (Bayou Classic)	NBC/Peacock	W 28–27	63,000
*Non-conference game; ^{†}Homecoming; Rankings from STATS Poll released prior to the game; All times are in Central time

== Game summaries ==
=== vs. North Carolina Central (MEAC/SWAC Challenge) ===
Game One – North Carolina Central Eagles (0-0) vs. Southern Jaguars (0-0) – Game summary

Quarter	1	2	3	4	Total
Eagles	7	10	14	0	31
Jaguars	7	7	0	0	14

at Center Parc Stadium • Atlanta, GA

- Date: August 23
- Game time: 7:30 PM EDT
- Game attendance: 16,191
- Referee: Y.N. Meyers
- TV announcers (ABC): Tiffany Greene (play-by-play), Jay Walker (analyst) and Quint Kessenich (sideline reporter)

Game information

First quarter

- NCCU – Arthur Rodgers Jr. 1-yard run (Kaleb Robison kick), 7:59. Eagles 7–0. Drive: 13 plays, 80 yards, 7:01.
- SOU – Cam'Ron McCoy 69-yard run (Nathan Zimmer kick), 6:26. Tied 7–7. Drive: 3 plays, 80 yards, 1:33.

Second quarter

- NCCU – Kaleb Robison 24-yard field goal, 3:24. Eagles 10–7. Drive: 12 plays, 75 yards, 6:01.
- SOU – Trey Holly 80-yard run (Nathan Zimmer kick), 1:57. Jaguars 14–10. Drive: 3 plays, 88 yards, 1:27.
- NCCU – Chris Mosley 49-yard run (Kaleb Robison kick), 1:40. Eagles 17–14. Drive: 1 play, 49 yards, 0:17.

Third quarter

- NCCU – Kyle Morgan 3-yard pass from Walker Harris (Kaleb Robison kick), 10:59. Eagles 24–14. Drive: 6 plays, 34 yards, 2:33.
- NCCU – Aleni Mageo 6-yard run (Kaleb Robison kick), 4:50. Eagles 31–14. Drive: 6 plays, 55 yards, 3:12.

Fourth quarter

No scoring plays.

Statistics	NCCU	SOU
First downs	21	15
Total yards	409	337
Rushes–yards	36–223	30–249
Passing yards	186	88
Passing: Comp–Att–Int	22–27–0	13–19–0
Turnovers	1	1
Time of possession	35:06	24:54

Team	Category	Player	Statistics
North Carolina Central	Passing	Walker Harris	22/27, 186 yards, TD
North Carolina Central	Rushing	Chris Mosley	17 carries, 182 yards, TD
North Carolina Central	Receiving	Mehki Wall	2 receptions, 41 yards
Southern	Passing	Cam'Ron McCoy	9/14, 70 yards
Southern	Rushing	Trey Holly	10 carries, 119 yards, TD
Southern	Receiving	Cam Jefferson	3 receptions, 23 yards

=== at Mississippi Valley State ===
Southern Jaguars (0-1) at Mississippi Valley State Delta Devils (0-0) – Game summary

Quarter	1	2	3	4	Total
Jaguars	-	-	-	-	0
Delta Devils	-	-	-	-	0

at Rice–Totten Stadium • Itta Bena, MS

- Date: August 30
- Game time: 4:00 PM CDT
- TV announcers (SWAC TV): Mo Carter (play by play) and Reggie Flood (analyst)

Statistics	SOU	MVSU
First downs		
Total yards		
Rushing yards		
Passing yards		
Passing: Comp–Att–Int		
Time of possession		

Team	Category	Player	Statistics
Southern	Passing		
Southern	Rushing		
Southern	Receiving		
Mississippi Valley State	Passing		
Mississippi Valley State	Rushing		
Mississippi Valley State	Receiving		

=== Alabama State ===
Alabama State Hornets (0-1) vs. Southern Jaguars (1-1) – Game summary

Quarter	1	2	3	4	Total
Hornets	3	3	17	7	30
Jaguars	0	0	7	0	7

at A. W. Mumford Stadium • Baton Rouge, LA

- Date: September 6
- Game time: 6:00 PM CDT
- TV announcers (ESPN+): Tiffany Greene (play-by-play) and Jay Walker (analyst)

Statistics	ALST	SOU
First downs		
Total yards		
Rushing yards		
Passing yards		
Passing: Comp–Att–Int		
Time of possession		

Team	Category	Player	Statistics
Alabama State	Passing		
Alabama State	Rushing		
Alabama State	Receiving		
Southern	Passing		
Southern	Rushing		
Southern	Receiving		

=== at Fresno State (FBS) ===
Southern Jaguars (1-2) at Fresno State Bulldogs (FBS) (2-1) – Game summary

Quarter	1	2	3	4	Total
Jaguars	0	7	0	0	7
Bulldogs (FBS)	14	21	7	14	56

at Valley Children's Stadium • Fresno, CA

- Date: September 13
- Game time: 9:00 PM CDT
- Game weather: Sunny
- Game attendance: 37,210
- Referee: Brad Carrell
- TV announcers (KGPE): Matt Norville (play-by-play), Cam Worrell (analyst) and Taylor Martinez (sideline)

Game information

First quarter

- (11:53) FRES – Harold Duvall 25-yard pass from E.J. Warner, Dylan Lynch kick (Drive: 6 plays, 65 yards, 3:07; Fresno State 7–0)
- (2:54) FRES – Jordan Brown 6-yard pass from E.J. Warner, Dylan Lynch kick (Drive: 11 plays, 45 yards, 6:06; Fresno State 14–0)

Second quarter

- (10:58) FRES – Rayshon Luke 19-yard pass from E.J. Warner, Dylan Lynch kick (Drive: 4 plays, 41 yards, 1:55; Fresno State 21–0)
- (5:41) SOU – Trey Holly 1-yard run, Nathan Zimmer kick (Drive: 9 plays, 85 yards, 5:28; Fresno State 21–7)
- (5:28) FRES – Bryson Donelson 57-yard run, Dylan Lynch kick (Drive: 1 play, 57 yards, 0:03; Fresno State 28–7)
- (0:21) FRES – Richie Anderson III 22-yard pass from E.J. Warner, Dylan Lynch kick (Drive: 8 plays, 66 yards, 0:11; Fresno State 35–7)

Third quarter

- (3:06) FRES – Rayshon Luke 19-yard run, Dylan Lynch kick (Drive: 7 plays, 44 yards, 2:47; Fresno State 42–7)

Fourth quarter

- (10:10) FRES – Jonathan Arceneaux 3-yard run, Dylan Lynch kick (Drive: 10 plays, 64 yards, 5:29; Fresno State 49–7)
- (5:42) FRES – Elijah Gilliam 5-yard run, Dylan Lynch kick (Drive: 8 plays, 54 yards, 3:16; Fresno State 56–7)

Statistics	SOU	FRES
First downs	7	31
Plays–yards	45–142	71–507
Rushes–yards	27–11	41–225
Passing yards	131	282
Passing: Comp–Att–Int	10–18–0	25–30–0
Turnovers	0	1
Time of possession	25:14	34:46

Team	Category	Player	Statistics
Southern	Passing	Ashton Strother	9/14, 127 yards
Southern	Rushing	Jason Gabriel	9 carries, 13 yards
Southern	Receiving	Malachi Jackson	2 receptions, 55 yards
Fresno State	Passing	E. J. Warner	20/24, 240 yards, 4 TD
Fresno State	Rushing	Bryson Donelson	9 carries, 90 yards, TD
Fresno State	Receiving	Rayshon Luke	7 receptions, 79 yards, TD

=== No. 19 Jackson State (rivalry) ===
No. 19 Jackson State Tigers (2-1) vs. Southern Jaguars (1-3) – Game summary

Quarter	1	2	3	4	Total
No. 19 Tigers	7	10	7	14	38
Jaguars	3	10	0	0	13

at A. W. Mumford Stadium • Baton Rouge, LA

- Date: September 27
- Game time: 6:00 PM CDT
- TV announcers (ESPN+): Tiffany Greene (play-by-play) and Jay Walker (analyst)

Statistics	JKST	SOU
First downs		
Total yards		
Rushing yards		
Passing yards		
Passing: Comp–Att–Int		
Time of possession		

Team	Category	Player	Statistics
Jackson State	Passing		
Jackson State	Rushing		
Jackson State	Receiving		
Southern	Passing		
Southern	Rushing		
Southern	Receiving		

=== at Bethune–Cookman ===
Southern Jaguars (1-4) vs. Bethune–Cookman Wildcats (2-4) – Game summary

Quarter	1	2	3	4	Total
Jaguars	-	-	-	-	0
Wildcats	-	-	-	-	0

at Daytona Stadium • Daytona Beach, FL

- Date: October 11
- Game time: 3:00 PM EDT
- TV announcers (SWAC TV): Kenny Schierlinger (play by play) and Messod Bendayan (analyst)

Statistics	SOU	BCU
First downs		
Total yards		
Rushing yards		
Passing yards		
Passing: Comp–Att–Int		
Time of possession		

Team	Category	Player	Statistics
Southern	Passing		
Southern	Rushing		
Southern	Receiving		
Bethune–Cookman	Passing		
Bethune–Cookman	Rushing		
Bethune–Cookman	Receiving		

=== Prairie View A&M ===
Prairie View A&M Panthers (4-2) vs. Southern Jaguars (1-5) – Game summary

Quarter	1	2	3	4	Total
Panthers	-	-	-	-	0
Jaguars	-	-	-	-	0

at A. W. Mumford Stadium • Baton Rouge, LA

- Date: October 18
- Game time: 4:00 PM CDT
- TV announcers (HBCU Go): James Hadnot (play by play), Jon Kelley (analyst) and Nicole Hutchison (sideline reporter)

Statistics	PV	SOU
First downs		
Total yards		
Rushing yards		
Passing yards		
Passing: Comp–Att–Int		
Time of possession		

Team	Category	Player	Statistics
Prairie View A&M	Passing		
Prairie View A&M	Rushing		
Prairie View A&M	Receiving		
Southern	Passing		
Southern	Rushing		
Southern	Receiving		

=== Florida A&M ===
Florida A&M Rattlers (2-4) vs. Southern Jaguars (1-6) – Game summary

Quarter	1	2	3	4	Total
Rattlers	-	-	-	-	0
Jaguars	-	-	-	-	0

at A. W. Mumford Stadium • Baton Rouge, LA

- Date: October 25
- Game time: 4:00 PM CDT
- TV announcers (SWAC TV): Mo Carter (play by play) and Jorge Vargas (analyst)

Statistics	FAMU	SOU
First downs		
Total yards		
Rushing yards		
Passing yards		
Passing: Comp–Att–Int		
Time of possession		

Team	Category	Player	Statistics
Florida A&M	Passing		
Florida A&M	Rushing		
Florida A&M	Receiving		
Southern	Passing		
Southern	Rushing		
Southern	Receiving		

=== at Arkansas–Pine Bluff ===
Southern Jaguars (1-7) vs. Arkansas–Pine Bluff Golden Lions (3-5) – Game summary

Quarter	1	2	3	4	Total
Jaguars	-	-	-	-	0
Golden Lions	-	-	-	-	0

at Simmons Bank Field • Pine Bluff, AR

- Date: November 1
- Game time: 2:00 PM CDT
- TV announcers (SWAC TV): LaRon Marbley (play by play) and Carlos James (analyst)

Statistics	SOU	UAPB
First downs		
Total yards		
Rushing yards		
Passing yards		
Passing: Comp–Att–Int		
Time of possession		

Team	Category	Player	Statistics
Southern	Passing		
Southern	Rushing		
Southern	Receiving		
Arkansas–Pine Bluff	Passing		
Arkansas–Pine Bluff	Rushing		
Arkansas–Pine Bluff	Receiving		

=== at Alcorn State ===
Southern Jaguars (1-8) vs. Alcorn State Braves (3-6) – Game summary

Quarter	1	2	3	4	Total
Jaguars	-	-	-	-	0
Braves	-	-	-	-	0

at Casem-Spinks Stadium • Lorman, MS

- Date: November 8
- Game time: 3:00 PM CST
- TV announcers (ESPN+): Jason Ross Jr. (play by play) and Tyoka Jackson (analyst)

Statistics	SOU	ALCN
First downs		
Total yards		
Rushing yards		
Passing yards		
Passing: Comp–Att–Int		
Time of possession		

Team	Category	Player	Statistics
Southern	Passing		
Southern	Rushing		
Southern	Receiving		
Alcorn State	Passing		
Alcorn State	Rushing		
Alcorn State	Receiving		

=== Texas Southern ===
Texas Southern Tigers (0-0) vs. Southern Jaguars (0-0) – Game summary

Quarter	1	2	3	4	Total
Tigers	-	-	-	-	0
Jaguars	-	-	-	-	0

at A. W. Mumford Stadium • Baton Rouge, LA

- Date: November 15
- Game time: 2:00 PM CST
- TV announcers (SWAC TV): Butch Alsandor (play by play) and Jorge Vargas (analyst)

Statistics	TXSO	SOU
First downs		
Total yards		
Rushing yards		
Passing yards		
Passing: Comp–Att–Int		
Time of possession		

Team	Category	Player	Statistics
Texas Southern	Passing		
Texas Southern	Rushing		
Texas Southern	Receiving		
Southern	Passing		
Southern	Rushing		
Southern	Receiving		

=== vs. Grambling State (Bayou Classic) ===
Grambling State Tigers (0-0) vs. Southern Jaguars (0-0) – Game summary

Quarter	1	2	3	4	Total
Tigers	-	-	-	-	0
Jaguars	-	-	-	-	0

at Caesars Superdome • New Orleans, LA

- Date: November 29
- Game time: 1:00 PM CST
- TV announcers (NBC): Chris Lewis (play by play), Anthony Herron (analyst) and Lewis Johnson (sideline reporter)

Statistics	GRAM	SOU
First downs		
Total yards		
Rushing yards		
Passing yards		
Passing: Comp–Att–Int		
Time of possession		

Team	Category	Player	Statistics
Grambling State	Passing		
Grambling State	Rushing		
Grambling State	Receiving		
Southern	Passing		
Southern	Rushing		
Southern	Receiving		
