= 2025 Alcorn State Braves football team =

American college football season

2025 Alcorn State Braves football
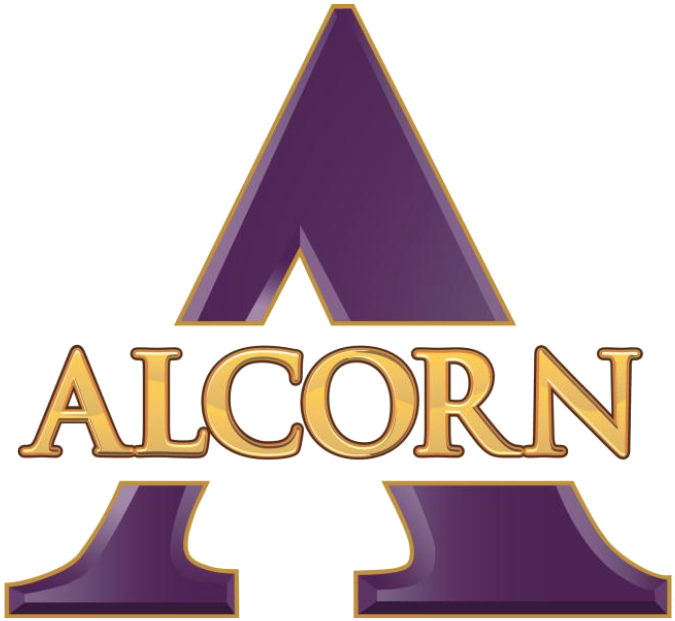
- Conference: Southwestern Athletic Conference
- West Division
- Record: 5–7 (4–4 SWAC)
- Head coach: Cedric Thomas (2nd season)
- Offensive coordinator: Jermaine Gales (2nd season)
- Defensive coordinator: Deion Roberson (2nd season)
- Home stadium: Casem-Spinks Stadium

2025 Southwestern Athletic Conference football standings
	Conf.			Overall
Team	W		L	W		L
East Division
Jackson State xy	7	–	1	9	–	3
Alabama State x	7	–	1	10	–	2
Bethune–Cookman	5	–	3	6	–	6
Florida A&M	4	–	4	5	–	7
Alabama A&M	1	–	7	4	–	8
Mississippi Valley State*	1	–	7	2	–	10
West Division
Prairie View A&M xy$	7	–	1	10	–	4
Texas Southern	5	–	3	6	–	5
Alcorn State	4	–	4	5	–	7
Grambling State	4	–	4	7	–	5
Arkansas–Pine Bluff*	2	–	6	4	–	8
Southern	1	–	7	2	–	10
Championship: Prairie View A&M 23, Jackson State 21
$ – Conference champion; x – Division champion/co-champions; y – Championship game participant; * – Ineligible for FCS postseason play due to failed academic requirements; Rankings from STATS Poll

The 2025 Alcorn State Braves football team represented Alcorn State University as a member of the Southwestern Athletic Conference (SWAC) during the 2025 NCAA Division I FCS football season. The Braves were led by second-year head coach Cedric Thomas and played at the Casem-Spinks Stadium in Lorman, Mississippi.

== Schedule ==
Date	Time	Opponent	Site	TV	Result	Attendance
August 28	7:00 p.m.	at Northwestern State*	Harry Turpin Stadium; Natchitoches, LA	ESPN+	L 10–20	9,434
September 6	6:00 p.m.	at Alabama A&M (Note: The game against Alabama A&M, a fellow member of the SWAC, is a non-conference game and does not count in the league standings.)*	Louis Crews Stadium; Huntsville, AL	HBCU Go	L 31–41	15,147
September 13	5:00 p.m.	at Mississippi State*	Davis Wade Stadium; Starkville, MS	SECN+/ESPN+	L 0–63	49,158
September 27	6:00 p.m.	vs. Arkansas–Pine Bluff	Simmons Bank Liberty Stadium; Memphis, TN (Southern Heritage Classic)	theGrio	L 20–24	21,442
October 4	3:00 p.m.	Prairie View A&M	Casem-Spinks Stadium; Lorman, MS	SWAC TV	L 12–13	4,322
October 11	2:00 p.m.	Lincoln (CA)*^{†}	Casem-Spinks Stadium; Lorman, MS	SWAC TV	W 42–0	7,201
October 18	3:00 p.m.	at Florida A&M	Bragg Memorial Stadium; Tallahassee, FL	ESPN+	L 28–33	
October 25	2:00 p.m.	Mississippi Valley State	Casem-Spinks Stadium; Lorman, MS	SWAC TV	W 32–10	4,795
November 1	2:00 p.m.	at Texas Southern	Shell Energy Stadium; Houston, TX	HBCU Go	W 33–14	3,983
November 8	3:00 p.m.	Southern	Casem-Spinks Stadium; Lorman, MS	ESPN+	W 35–17	14,458
November 15	2:00 p.m.	Grambling State	Casem-Spinks Stadium; Lorman, MS	SWAC TV	W 27–16	7,845
November 22	2:30 p.m.	at No. 20 Jackson State	Mississippi Veterans Memorial Stadium; Jackson, MS (Soul Bowl)	ESPN+	L 21–27	44,097
*Non-conference game; ^{†}Homecoming; Rankings from STATS Poll released prior to the game; All times are in Central time

== Game summaries ==
=== at Northwestern State ===
Alcorn State Braves (0-0) at Northwestern State Demons (0-0) – Game summary

Quarter	1	2	3	4	Total
Braves	0	0	10	0	10
Demons	13	0	0	7	20

at Harry Turpin Stadium, Natchitoches, Louisiana

- Date: August 28
- Game time: 7:00 PM CDT
- Game weather: Cloudy • Temperature: 89 °F (32 °C) • Wind: SE at 0 miles per hour (0 km/h)
- Game attendance: 9,434
- Referee: Gil Rora
- TV announcers (ESPN+): Patrick Netherton (play-by-play), Gary Reasons (analyst) and Jason Pugh (sideline)

Game information

First quarter

- NWST – Ty Moore 15-yard pass from Abram Johnston (Grayson Lytton kick BLOCKED), 13:53. Demons 6–0. Drive: 3 plays, 66 yards, 1:07.
- NWST – Ty Moore 8-yard punt return (Grayson Lytton kick), 7:44. Demons 13–0.

Second quarter

No scoring plays.

Third quarter

- ALCN – Orlandus McLaurin 72-yard interception return (Grandin Willcox kick), 2:25. Demons 13–7.
- ALCN – Grandin Willcox 51-yard field goal, 0:34. Demons 13–10. Drive: 4 plays, -8 yards, 0:56.

Fourth quarter

- NWST – Ryan Tyler 1-yard run (Grayson Lytton kick), 9:06. Demons 20–10. Drive: 12 plays, 68 yards, 6:17.

Statistics	ALCN	NWST
First downs	18	12
Total yards	301	270
Rushing yards	119	185
Passing yards	182	85
Turnovers	3	2
Time of possession	30:03	29:57

Team	Category	Player	Statistics
Alcorn State	Passing	Jaylon Tolbert	19/44, 182 yards, 2 INT
Alcorn State	Rushing	Reggie Davis	15 carries, 65 yards
Alcorn State	Receiving	Elijah Griffin	2 receptions, 58 yards
Northwestern State	Passing	Abram Johnston	9/18, 85 yards, TD, INT
Northwestern State	Rushing	Abram Johnston	17 carries, 69 yards
Northwestern State	Receiving	Kody Finley	1 reception, 26 yards

=== at Alabama A&M ===
Alcorn State Braves (0-1) at Alabama A&M Bulldogs (0-1) – Game summary

Quarter	1	2	3	4	Total
Braves	14	3	7	7	31
Bulldogs	21	7	7	6	41

at Louis Crews Stadium • Huntsville, AL

- Date: September 6
- Game time: 6:00 PM CDT
- Game weather: Cloudy • Temperature: 71 °F (22 °C) • Wind: NW at 9 miles per hour (14 km/h)
- Game attendance: 15,147
- Referee: Y.N. Meyers III
- TV announcers (HBCU Go): Charlie Neal (play-by-play), Jon Kelley (analyst) and Lawrencia Moten (sideline)

Game information

First Quarter

- (12:21) AAMU – Jordan Chambers-Smith 19-yard pass from Cornelious Brown, Victor Barbosa kick (Drive: 2 plays, 21 yards, 0:47; Alabama A&M 7–0)
- (9:40) ALCN – Reggie Davis 2-yard run, Grandin Willcox kick (Drive: 7 plays, 65 yards, 2:41; Tied 7–7)
- (6:52) AAMU – Daveon Walker 18-yard pass from Cornelious Brown, Victor Barbosa kick (Drive: 7 plays, 75 yards, 2:48; Alabama A&M 14–7)
- (6:12) ALCN – Jacorian Sewell 80-yard run, Grandin Willcox kick (Drive: 2 plays, 80 yards, 0:40; Tied 14–14)
- (2:43) AAMU – Cornelious Brown 7-yard run, Victor Barbosa kick (Drive: 9 plays, 77 yards, 3:23; Alabama A&M 21–14)

Second Quarter

- (8:22) AAMU – Cornelious Brown 8-yard run, Victor Barbosa kick (Drive: 8 plays, 78 yards, 2:24; Alabama A&M 28–14)
- (1:09) ALCN – Grandin Willcox 40-yard field goal (Drive: 7 plays, 48 yards, 2:46; Alabama A&M 28–17)

Third Quarter

- (9:44) AAMU – Travaunta Abner 1-yard pass from Cornelious Brown, Victor Barbosa kick (Drive: 10 plays, 69 yards, 3:30; Alabama A&M 35–17)
- (7:49) ALCN – Reggie Davis 20-yard run, Grandin Willcox kick (Drive: 4 plays, 49 yards, 1:48; Alabama A&M 35–24)

Fourth Quarter

- (10:30) ALCN – Jarvis Rush 18-yard pass from Jaylon Tolbert, Grandin Willcox kick (Drive: 15 plays, 80 yards, 7:37; Alabama A&M 35–31)
- (0:19) AAMU – Maurice Edwards 1-yard run (Drive: 5 plays, 23 yards, 2:27; Alabama A&M 41–31)

Statistics	ALCN	AAMU
First downs	20	23
Total yards	354	452
Rushing yards	186	192
Passing yards	168	260
Passing: Comp–Att–Int	23–33–0	25–34–0
Time of possession	30:55	29:05

Team	Category	Player	Statistics
Alcorn State	Passing	Jaylon Tolbert	23/33, 168 yards, TD
Alcorn State	Rushing	Jacorian Sewell	12 carries, 115 yards, TD
Alcorn State	Receiving	Jarvis Rush	7 receptions, 53 yards, TD
Alabama A&M	Passing	Cornelious Brown	25/34, 260 yards, 3 TD
Alabama A&M	Rushing	Maurice Edwards	21 carries, 80 yards, TD
Alabama A&M	Receiving	Daveon Walker	6 receptions, 78 yards, TD

=== at Mississippi State (FBS) ===
Alcorn State Braves (0-2) at Mississippi State Bulldogs (FBS) (2-0) – Game summary

Quarter	1	2	3	4	Total
Braves	0	0	0	0	0
Bulldogs (FBS)	28	14	7	14	63

at Davis Wade Stadium • Starkville, MS

- Date: September 13
- Game time: 5:00 PM CDT
- Game weather: Sunny • Temperature: 89 °F (32 °C) • Wind: NE at 4 miles per hour (6.4 km/h)
- Game attendance: 49,158
- Referee: Steven Robinson
- TV announcers (SECN+/ESPN+): Richard Cross (play-by-play), Charles Arbuckle (analyst) and Stephanie Otey (sideline)

Game information

First quarter

- MSST – Jordan Mosley 75-yard pass from Blake Shapen (Kyle Ferrie kick), 14:43. Bulldogs 7–0. Drive: 2 plays, 75 yards, 0:17.
- MSST – Fluff Bothwell 3-yard run (Kyle Ferrie kick), 9:15. Bulldogs 14–0. Drive: 6 plays, 29 yards, 2:25.
- MSST – Brenen Thompson 42-yard pass from Kamario Taylor (Kyle Ferrie kick), 8:02. Bulldogs 21–0. Drive: 2 plays, 76 yards, 0:34.
- MSST – Blake Shapen 6-yard run (Kyle Ferrie kick), 5:12. Bulldogs 28–0. Drive: 3 plays, 27 yards, 0:58.

Second quarter

- MSST – Anthony Evans III 22-yard pass from Blake Shapen (Kyle Ferrie kick), 7:20. Bulldogs 35–0. Drive: 5 plays, 29 yards, 2:07.
- MSST – Fluff Bothwell 25-yard run (Kyle Ferrie kick), 3:50. Bulldogs 42–0. Drive: 7 plays, 44 yards, 2:03.

Third quarter

- MSST – Xavier Gayten 25-yard run (Kyle Ferrie kick), 5:53. Bulldogs 49–0. Drive: 5 plays, 63 yards, 2:10.

Fourth quarter

- MSST – Luke Kromenhoek 3-yard run (Marlon Hauck kick), 9:55. Bulldogs 56–0. Drive: 1 play, 3 yards, 5:05.
- MSST – Seth Davis 23-yard run (Marlon Hauck kick), 3:30. Bulldogs 63–0. Drive: 7 plays, 54 yards, 3:59.

Statistics	ALCN	MSST
First downs	9	23
Total yards	161	514
Rushing yards	68	282
Passing yards	93	232
Passing: Comp–Att–Int	13–21–1	13–18–1
Time of possession	43:07	16:53

Team	Category	Player	Statistics
Alcorn State	Passing	Jaylon Tolbert	11/18, 80 yards, INT
Alcorn State	Rushing	Jacorian Sewell	8 carries, 21 yards
Alcorn State	Receiving	Damien Jones	4 receptions, 21 yards
Mississippi State	Passing	Blake Shapen	10/14, 173 yards, 2 TD, INT
Mississippi State	Rushing	Fluff Bothwell	12 carries, 93 yards, 2 TD
Mississippi State	Receiving	Anthony Evans III	4 receptions, 66 yards, TD

=== vs. Arkansas–Pine Bluff (Southern Heritage Classic) ===
Arkansas–Pine Bluff Golden Lions (1-2) vs. Alcorn State Braves (0-3) – Game summary

Quarter	1	2	3	4	Total
Braves	6	7	7	0	20
Golden Lions	3	14	0	7	24

at Simmons Bank Liberty Stadium • Memphis, TN

- Date: September 27
- Game time: 6:00 PM CDT
- Game weather: Sunny • Temperature: 83 °F (28 °C) • Wind: N at 6 miles per hour (9.7 km/h)
- Game attendance: 21,442
- Referee: Greg Morgan
- TV announcers (theGrio): Tolly Carr (play-by-play), Steve Wyche (analyst), and Nia Symone (sideline)

Statistics	ALCN	UAPB
First downs		
Total yards		
Rushing yards		
Passing yards		
Turnovers		
Time of possession		

Team	Category	Player	Statistics
Alcorn State	Passing		
Alcorn State	Rushing		
Alcorn State	Receiving		
Arkansas–Pine Bluff	Passing		
Arkansas–Pine Bluff	Rushing		
Arkansas–Pine Bluff	Receiving		

=== Prairie View A&M ===
Prairie View A&M Panthers (3-2) vs. Alcorn State Braves (0-4) – Game summary

Quarter	1	2	3	4	Total
Panthers	3	7	0	3	13
Braves	3	3	6	0	12

at Casem-Spinks Stadium • Lorman, MS

- Date: October 4
- Game time: 3:00 PM CDT
- Game weather: Sunny
- Game attendance: 4,322
- Referee: Y.N. Meyers III
- TV announcers (SWAC TV): Charles Bishop (play-by-play) and Charles Porter (analyst)

Statistics	PV	ALCN
First downs		
Total yards		
Rushing yards		
Passing yards		
Passing: Comp–Att–Int		
Time of possession		

Team	Category	Player	Statistics
Prairie View A&M	Passing		
Prairie View A&M	Rushing		
Prairie View A&M	Receiving		
Alcorn State	Passing		
Alcorn State	Rushing		
Alcorn State	Receiving		

=== Lincoln (CA) (Ind) ===
Lincoln Oaklanders (Ind) (0-4) vs. Alcorn State Braves (0-5) – Game summary

Quarter	1	2	3	4	Total
Oaklanders (Ind)	0	0	0	0	0
Braves	14	7	21	0	42

at Casem-Spinks Stadium • Lorman, MS

- Date: October 11
- Game time: 2:00 PM CDT
- Game weather: Sunny • Temperature: 77 °F (25 °C)
- Game attendance: 7,201
- Referee: Nathan Pinkard
- TV announcers (SWAC TV): Santoria Black (play-by-play) and Reggie Flood (analyst)

Statistics	LCLN	ALCN
First downs		
Total yards		
Rushing yards		
Passing yards		
Passing: Comp–Att–Int		
Time of possession		

Team	Category	Player	Statistics
Lincoln (CA)	Passing		
Lincoln (CA)	Rushing		
Lincoln (CA)	Receiving		
Alcorn State	Passing		
Alcorn State	Rushing		
Alcorn State	Receiving		

=== at Florida A&M ===
Alcorn State Braves (1-5) vs. Florida A&M Rattlers (1-4) – Game summary

Quarter	1	2	3	4	Total
Braves	0	14	0	14	28
Rattlers	6	3	8	16	33

at Bragg Memorial Stadium • Tallahassee, FL

- Date: October 18
- Game time: 4:00 PM EDT
- Game weather: Sunny
- Game attendance: 19,465
- Referee: Charles Green
- TV announcers (ESPN+): Tiffany Greene (play-by-play) and Jay Walker (analyst)

Statistics	ALCN	FAMU
First downs		
Total yards		
Rushing yards		
Passing yards		
Passing: Comp–Att–Int		
Time of possession		

Team	Category	Player	Statistics
Alcorn State	Passing		
Alcorn State	Rushing		
Alcorn State	Receiving		
Florida A&M	Passing		
Florida A&M	Rushing		
Florida A&M	Receiving		

=== Mississippi Valley State ===
Mississippi Valley State Delta Devils (1-5) vs. Alcorn State Braves (1-6) – Game summary

Quarter	1	2	3	4	Total
Delta Devils	0	0	7	3	10
Braves	9	13	10	0	32

at Casem-Spinks Stadium • Lorman, MS

- Date: October 25
- Game time: 2:00 PM CDT
- Game weather: Rain • Temperature: 72 °F (22 °C) • Wind: NW at 10 miles per hour (16 km/h)-->
- Game attendance: 4,795
- Referee: Jarvis Walker
- TV announcers (SWAC TV): Santoria Black (play-by-play) and Ken Moore (analyst)

Statistics	MVSU	ALCN
First downs		
Total yards		
Rushing yards		
Passing yards		
Passing: Comp–Att–Int		
Time of possession		

Team	Category	Player	Statistics
Mississippi Valley State	Passing		
Mississippi Valley State	Rushing		
Mississippi Valley State	Receiving		
Alcorn State	Passing		
Alcorn State	Rushing		
Alcorn State	Receiving		

=== at Texas Southern ===
Alcorn State Braves (2-6) vs. Texas Southern Tigers (4-3) – Game summary

Quarter	1	2	3	4	Total
Braves	-	-	-	-	0
Tigers	-	-	-	-	0

at Shell Energy Stadium • Houston, TX

- Date: November 1
- Game time: 2:00 PM CDT
- TV announcers (HBCU Go): James Hadnot (play-by-play), Jon Kelley (analyst) and Lawrencia Moton (sideline)

Statistics	ALCN	TXSO
First downs		
Total yards		
Rushing yards		
Passing yards		
Passing: Comp–Att–Int		
Time of possession		

Team	Category	Player	Statistics
Alcorn State	Passing		
Alcorn State	Rushing		
Alcorn State	Receiving		
Texas Southern	Passing		
Texas Southern	Rushing		
Texas Southern	Receiving		

=== Southern ===
Southern Jaguars (1-8) vs. Alcorn State Braves (3-6) – Game summary

Quarter	1	2	3	4	Total
Jaguars	-	-	-	-	0
Braves	-	-	-	-	0

at Casem-Spinks Stadium • Lorman, MS

- Date: November 8
- Game time: 3:00 PM CST
- TV announcers (ESPN+): Jason Ross Jr. (play by play) and Tyoka Jackson (analyst)

Statistics	SOU	ALCN
First downs		
Total yards		
Rushing yards		
Passing yards		
Passing: Comp–Att–Int		
Time of possession		

Team	Category	Player	Statistics
Southern	Passing		
Southern	Rushing		
Southern	Receiving		
Alcorn State	Passing		
Alcorn State	Rushing		
Alcorn State	Receiving		

=== Grambling State ===
Grambling State Tigers (0-0) vs. Alcorn State Braves (0-0) – Game summary

Quarter	1	2	3	4	Total
Tigers	-	-	-	-	0
Braves	-	-	-	-	0

at Casem-Spinks Stadium • Lorman, MS

- Date: November 15
- Game time: 2:00 PM CST
- TV announcers (ESPN+): Santoria Black (play by play) and Ken Moore (analyst)

Statistics	GRAM	ALCN
First downs		
Total yards		
Rushing yards		
Passing yards		
Passing: Comp–Att–Int		
Time of possession		

Team	Category	Player	Statistics
Grambling State	Passing		
Grambling State	Rushing		
Grambling State	Receiving		
Alcorn State	Passing		
Alcorn State	Rushing		
Alcorn State	Receiving		

=== at No. 20 Jackson State (Soul Bowl) ===
Alcorn State Braves (5-6) vs. No. 20 Jackson State Tigers (8-2) – Game summary

Quarter	1	2	3	4	Total
Braves	-	-	-	-	0
No. 20 Tigers	-	-	-	-	0

at Mississippi Veterans Memorial Stadium • Jackson, MS

- Date: November 22
- Game time: 2:30 PM CST
- TV announcers (ESPN+): Jason Ross Jr. (play by play) and Tyoka Jackson (analyst)

Statistics	ALCN	JKST
First downs		
Total yards		
Rushing yards		
Passing yards		
Passing: Comp–Att–Int		
Time of possession		

Team	Category	Player	Statistics
Alcorn State	Passing		
Alcorn State	Rushing		
Alcorn State	Receiving		
Jackson State	Passing		
Jackson State	Rushing		
Jackson State	Receiving		
