= 2025 Alabama A&M Bulldogs football team =

American college football season

2025 Alabama A&M Bulldogs football
- Conference: Southwestern Athletic Conference
- East Division
- Record: 4–8 (1–7 SWAC)
- Head coach: Sam Shade (1st season)
- Offensive coordinator: Dennis Alexander (1st season)
- Defensive coordinator: Chris Shelling (1st season)
- Home stadium: Louis Crews Stadium

2025 Southwestern Athletic Conference football standings
	Conf.			Overall
Team	W		L	W		L
East Division
Jackson State xy	7	–	1	9	–	3
Alabama State x	7	–	1	10	–	2
Bethune–Cookman	5	–	3	6	–	6
Florida A&M	4	–	4	5	–	7
Alabama A&M	1	–	7	4	–	8
Mississippi Valley State*	1	–	7	2	–	10
West Division
Prairie View A&M xy$	7	–	1	10	–	4
Texas Southern	5	–	3	6	–	5
Alcorn State	4	–	4	5	–	7
Grambling State	4	–	4	7	–	5
Arkansas–Pine Bluff*	2	–	6	4	–	8
Southern	1	–	7	2	–	10
Championship: Prairie View A&M 23, Jackson State 21
$ – Conference champion; x – Division champion/co-champions; y – Championship game participant; * – Ineligible for FCS postseason play due to failed academic requirements; Rankings from STATS Poll

The 2025 Alabama A&M Bulldogs football team represented Alabama A&M University as a member of the Southwestern Athletic Conference (SWAC) during the 2025 NCAA Division I FCS football season. The Bulldogs were led by first-year head coach Sam Shade and played at Louis Crews Stadium in Huntsville, Alabama.

The Alabama A&M Bulldogs drew an average home attendance of 14,111, the 11th-highest of all NCAA Division I FCS football teams.

== Schedule ==
Date	Time	Opponent	Site	TV	Result	Attendance
August 30	3:15 p.m.	at Arkansas*	Donald W. Reynolds Razorback Stadium; Fayetteville, AR	SECN	L 7–52	70,827
September 6	6:00 p.m.	Alcorn State*	Louis Crews Stadium; Huntsville, AL (Louis Crews Classic)	HBCU Go	W 41–31	15,147
September 13	3:30 p.m.	at Tennessee State*	Nissan Stadium; Nashville, TN (The Legacy Series)	ESPN+	W 23–21	10,208
September 20	6:00 p.m.	Lane*	Louis Crews Stadium; Huntsville, AL	SWAC TV	W 49–7	9,733
September 27	2:00 p.m.	at Bethune–Cookman	Daytona Stadium; Daytona Beach, FL	SWAC TV	L 34–41	5,630
October 4	4:00 p.m.	No. 17 Jackson State	Ladd–Peebles Stadium; Mobile, AL (Gulf Coast Challenge)	HBCU Go	L 24–57	14,517
October 11	2:00 p.m.	Mississippi Valley State^{†}	Louis Crews Stadium; Huntsville, AL	SWAC TV	W 45–25	19,871
October 25	2:30 p.m.	vs. Alabama State	Legion Field; Birmingham, AL (Magic City Classic)	ESPN+	L 13–56	69,372
November 1	2:00 p.m.	at Grambling State	Eddie G. Robinson Memorial Stadium; Grambling, LA	SWAC TV	L 10–13	8,776
November 8	2:00 p.m.	Prairie View A&M	Louis Crews Stadium; Huntsville, AL	SWAC TV	L 5–48	1,126
November 15	2:00 p.m.	Florida A&M	Louis Crews Stadium; Huntsville, AL (Senior Day)	SWAC TV	L 23–26	14,677
November 22	2:00 p.m.	at Texas Southern	Shell Energy Stadium; Houston, TX	HBCU Go	L 7–24	6,011
*Non-conference game; ^{†}Homecoming; Rankings from STATS Poll released prior to the game; All times are in Central time

== Game summaries ==
=== at Arkansas (FBS) ===
Alabama A&M Bulldogs (0–0) at Arkansas Razorbacks (FBS) (0–0) – Game summary

Quarter	1	2	3	4	Total
Bulldogs	7	0	0	0	7
Razorbacks (FBS)	10	21	14	7	52

at Donald W. Reynolds Razorback Stadium • Fayetteville, Arkansas

- Date: August 30
- Game time: 3:15 p.m. CDT
- Game weather: Sunny • Temperature: 81 °F (27 °C) • Wind: SE at 6 miles per hour (9.7 km/h)
- Game attendance: 70,827
- Referee: Steve Marlowe
- TV announcers (SECN): Dave Neal (play-by-play), Fozzy Whittaker (analyst), and Morgan Uber (sideline reporter)

Game information

First quarter

- (10:03) ARK – CJ Brown 16-yard pass from Taylen Green, Scott Starzyk kick (Drive: 9 plays, 73 yards, 4:51; Arkansas 7–0)
- (6:28) AAMU – Maurice Edwards IV 6-yard run, Victor Barbosa kick (Drive: 7 plays, 75 yards, 3:35; Tied 7–7)
- (3:37) ARK – Scott Starzyk 53-yard field goal (Drive: 6 plays, 33 yards, 2:45; Arkansas 10–7)

Second quarter

- (13:41) ARK – Raylen Sharpe 35-yard pass from Taylen Green, Scott Starzyk kick (Drive: 9 plays, 75 yards, 2:55; Arkansas 17–7)
- (2:12) ARK – Jalen Brown 5-yard pass from Taylen Green, Scott Starzyk kick (Drive: 6 plays, 65 yards, 2:20; Arkansas 24–7)
- (0:06) ARK – O'Mega Blake 6-yard pass from Taylen Green, Scott Starzyk kick (Drive: 6 plays, 59 yards, 0:59; Arkansas 31–7)

Third quarter

- (11:07) ARK – CJ Brown 14-yard pass from Taylen Green, Scott Starzyk kick (Drive: 6 plays, 66 yards, 3:08; Arkansas 38–7)
- (2:53) ARK – Andreas Paaske 5-yard pass from Taylen Green, Scott Starzyk kick (Drive: 12 plays, 65 yards, 6:08; Arkansas 45–7)

Fourth quarter

- (13:51) ARK – Mike Washington Jr. 27-yard pass from KJ Jackson, Scott Starzyk kick (Drive: 3 plays, 61 yards, 0:54; Arkansas 52–7)

Statistics	AAMU	ARK
First downs	12	29
Plays–yards	55–235	76–552
Rushes–yards	26–69	40–194
Passing yards	166	358
Passing: comp–att–int	15–29–0	26–36–0
Turnovers	2	0
Time of possession	26:21	33:39

Team	Category	Player	Statistics
Alabama A&M	Passing	Cornelius Brown IV	9/19, 130 yards
Alabama A&M	Rushing	Kaden Dixon	5 carries, 37 yards
Alabama A&M	Receiving	Travaunta Abner	3 receptions, 49 yards
Arkansas	Passing	Taylen Green	24/31, 322 yards, 6 TD
Arkansas	Rushing	Mike Washington Jr.	9 carries, 79 yards
Arkansas	Receiving	O'Mega Blake	7 receptions, 121 yards, TD

=== Alcorn State ===
Alcorn State Braves (0-1) at Alabama A&M Bulldogs (0-1) – Game summary

Quarter	1	2	3	4	Total
Braves	14	3	7	7	31
Bulldogs	21	7	7	6	41

at Louis Crews Stadium • Huntsville, AL

- Date: September 6
- Game time: 6:00 PM CDT
- Game weather: Cloudy • Temperature: 71 °F (22 °C) • Wind: NW at 9 miles per hour (14 km/h)
- Game attendance: 15,147
- Referee: Y.N. Meyers III
- TV announcers (HBCU Go): Charlie Neal (play-by-play), Jon Kelley (analyst) and Lawrencia Moten (sideline)

Game information

First Quarter

- (12:21) AAMU – Jordan Chambers-Smith 19-yard pass from Cornelious Brown, Victor Barbosa kick (Drive: 2 plays, 21 yards, 0:47; Alabama A&M 7–0)
- (9:40) ALCN – Reggie Davis 2-yard run, Grandin Willcox kick (Drive: 7 plays, 65 yards, 2:41; Tied 7–7)
- (6:52) AAMU – Daveon Walker 18-yard pass from Cornelious Brown, Victor Barbosa kick (Drive: 7 plays, 75 yards, 2:48; Alabama A&M 14–7)
- (6:12) ALCN – Jacorian Sewell 80-yard run, Grandin Willcox kick (Drive: 2 plays, 80 yards, 0:40; Tied 14–14)
- (2:43) AAMU – Cornelious Brown 7-yard run, Victor Barbosa kick (Drive: 9 plays, 77 yards, 3:23; Alabama A&M 21–14)

Second Quarter

- (8:22) AAMU – Cornelious Brown 8-yard run, Victor Barbosa kick (Drive: 8 plays, 78 yards, 2:24; Alabama A&M 28–14)
- (1:09) ALCN – Grandin Willcox 40-yard field goal (Drive: 7 plays, 48 yards, 2:46; Alabama A&M 28–17)

Third Quarter

- (9:44) AAMU – Travaunta Abner 1-yard pass from Cornelious Brown, Victor Barbosa kick (Drive: 10 plays, 69 yards, 3:30; Alabama A&M 35–17)
- (7:49) ALCN – Reggie Davis 20-yard run, Grandin Willcox kick (Drive: 4 plays, 49 yards, 1:48; Alabama A&M 35–24)

Fourth Quarter

- (10:30) ALCN – Jarvis Rush 18-yard pass from Jaylon Tolbert, Grandin Willcox kick (Drive: 15 plays, 80 yards, 7:37; Alabama A&M 35–31)
- (0:19) AAMU – Maurice Edwards 1-yard run (Drive: 5 plays, 23 yards, 2:27; Alabama A&M 41–31)

Statistics	ALCN	AAMU
First downs	20	23
Total yards	354	452
Rushing yards	186	192
Passing yards	168	260
Passing: Comp–Att–Int	23–33–0	25–34–0
Time of possession	30:55	29:05

Team	Category	Player	Statistics
Alcorn State	Passing	Jaylon Tolbert	23/33, 168 yards, TD
Alcorn State	Rushing	Jacorian Sewell	12 carries, 115 yards, TD
Alcorn State	Receiving	Jarvis Rush	7 receptions, 53 yards, TD
Alabama A&M	Passing	Cornelious Brown	25/34, 260 yards, 3 TD
Alabama A&M	Rushing	Maurice Edwards	21 carries, 80 yards, TD
Alabama A&M	Receiving	Daveon Walker	6 receptions, 78 yards, TD

=== at Tennessee State ===
Alabama A&M Bulldogs (1-1) vs. Tennessee State Tigers (1-1) – Game summary

Quarter	1	2	3	4	Total
Bulldogs	3	10	10	0	23
Tigers	0	21	0	0	21

at Nissan Stadium • Nashville, TN

- Date: September 13
- Game time: 3:30 PM CDT
- Game weather: Sunny • Temperature: 87 °F (31 °C)
- Game attendance: 10,208
- Referee: Gabriel Tomlin
- TV announcers (ESPN+): Dan Laing (play-by-play) and Dean Cokinos (analyst)

Game information

First Quarter

- (8:25) AAMU – Victor Barbosa 26-yard field goal (Drive: 9 plays, 62 yards, 3:23; Alabama A&M 3–0)

Second Quarter

- (13:51) AAMU – Myles Parker 5-yard pass from Cornelious Brown, Victor Barbosa kick (Drive: 8 plays, 98 yards, 2:39; Alabama A&M 10–0)
- (10:07) TNST – Kendric Rhymes 5-yard run, Freddy Perez kick (Drive: 6 plays, 75 yards, 3:44; Alabama A&M 10–7)
- (4:29) TNST – Zack Simmons-Brown 27-yard run, Freddy Perez kick (Drive: 9 plays, 68 yards, 4:41; Tennessee State 14–10)
- (1:39) AAMU – Victor Barbosa 26-yard field goal (Drive: 10 plays, 67 yards, 2:50; Tennessee State 14–13)
- (0:11) TNST – Kendric Rhymes 22-yard pass from Byron McNair, Freddy Perez kick (Drive: 6 plays, 49 yards, 1:19; Tennessee State 21–13)

Third Quarter

- (8:49) AAMU – Daveon Walker 30-yard pass from Cornelious Brown, Victor Barbosa kick (Drive: 8 plays, 84 yards, 2:45; Tennessee State 21–20)
- (0:51) AAMU – Victor Barbosa 45-yard field goal (Drive: 9 plays, 56 yards, 4:02; Alabama A&M 23–21)

Fourth Quarter

No scoring plays

Statistics	AAMU	TNST
First downs	19	21
Total yards	422	336
Rushing yards	67	179
Passing yards	355	157
Passing: Comp–Att–Int	23–35–0	17–27–1
Time of possession	24:16	35:44

Team	Category	Player	Statistics
Alabama A&M	Passing	Cornelious Brown	21/33, 329 yards, 2 TD
Alabama A&M	Rushing	Maurice Edwards	10 carries, 38 yards
Alabama A&M	Receiving	Travaunta Abner	6 receptions, 104 yards
Tennessee State	Passing	Byron McNair	17/27, 157 yards, TD, INT
Tennessee State	Rushing	Kendric Rhymes	24 carries, 111 yards, TD
Tennessee State	Receiving	Kendric Rhymes	7 receptions, 64 yards, TD

=== Lane (DII) ===
Lane Dragons (DII) (0–2) at Alabama A&M Bulldogs (2–1) – Game summary

Quarter	1	2	3	4	Total
Dragons (DII)	0	0	0	7	7
Bulldogs	7	21	21	0	49

at Louis Crews Stadium • Huntsville, AL

- Date: September 20
- Game time: 6:00 PM CDT
- Game weather: Sunny • Temperature: 87 °F (31 °C) • Wind: NE at 3 miles per hour (4.8 km/h)
- Game attendance: 9,733
- Referee: Ivan Daniels
- TV announcers (SWAC TV): Mo Carter (play-by-play) and Tolly Carr (analyst)

Game information

First Quarter

- (3:15) AAMU – 0-yard safety (Alabama A&M 2–0)
- (1:08) AAMU – Victor Barbosa 47-yard field goal (Drive: 6 plays, 11 yards, 2:00; Alabama A&M 5–0)
- (1:01) AAMU – Xzavier Booker 0-yard safety (Alabama A&M 7–0)

Second Quarter

- (14:13) AAMU – Ryan Morrow 12-yard run, Victor Barbosa kick (Drive: 5 plays, 40 yards, 1:42; Alabama A&M 14–0)
- (5:39) AAMU – Kolton Nero 10-yard run, Victor Barbosa kick (Drive: 9 plays, 63 yards, 3:15; Alabama A&M 21–0)
- (1:55) AAMU – Travaunta Abner 18-yard pass from Eric Handley, Victor Barbosa kick (Drive: 4 plays, 70 yards, 1:20; Alabama A&M 28–0)

Third Quarter

- (12:53) AAMU – Daveon Walker 10-yard pass from Eric Handley, Victor Barbosa kick (Drive: 4 plays, 47 yards, 1:58; Alabama A&M 35–0)
- (8:18) AAMU – Isaiah Nwokenkwo 21-yard run, Victor Barbosa kick (Drive: 6 plays, 27 yards, 2:50; Alabama A&M 42–0)
- (2:00) AAMU – Kolton Nero 28-yard run, Victor Barbosa kick (Drive: 3 plays, 40 yards, 1:38; Alabama A&M 49–0)

Fourth Quarter

- (5:45) LANE – John White 37-yard interception, Carter Dugan kick (Alabama A&M 49–7)

Statistics	LANE	AAMU
First downs	11	21
Total yards	155	397
Rushing yards	82	192
Passing yards	73	205
Passing: Comp–Att–Int	8–20–2	15–30–3
Time of possession	32:06	27:54

Team	Category	Player	Statistics
Lane	Passing	Nick Billoups	5/13, 56 yards, INT
Lane	Rushing	Marcell Cutright	3 carries, 35 yards
Lane	Receiving	Oliver Van Dyke	3 receptions, 30 yards
Alabama A&M	Passing	Eric Handley	15/28, 205 yards, 2 TD, 2 INT
Alabama A&M	Rushing	Kolton Nero	7 carries, 69 yards, 2 TD
Alabama A&M	Receiving	Travaunta Abner	4 receptions, 70 yards, TD

=== at Bethune–Cookman ===
Alabama A&M Bulldogs (3-1) vs. Bethune–Cookman Wildcats (1-3) – Game summary

Quarter	1	2	3	4	Total
Bulldogs	10	7	14	3	34
Wildcats	7	20	7	7	41

at Daytona Stadium • Daytona Beach, FL

- Date: September 27
- Game time: 3:00 PM EDT
- Game weather: Sunny, 86 degrees
- Game attendance: 5,630
- Referee: Preston Clipper
- TV announcers (SWAC TV): Kenny Schierlinger (play-by-play) and Davion Belk (analyst)

Statistics	AAMU	BCU
First downs		
Total yards		
Rushing yards		
Passing yards		
Passing: Comp–Att–Int		
Time of possession		

Team	Category	Player	Statistics
Alabama A&M	Passing		
Alabama A&M	Rushing		
Alabama A&M	Receiving		
Bethune–Cookman	Passing		
Bethune–Cookman	Rushing		
Bethune–Cookman	Receiving		

=== vs. No. 17 Jackson State ===
No. 17 Jackson State Tigers (3-1) vs. Alabama A&M Bulldogs (3-2) – Game summary

Quarter	1	2	3	4	Total
No. 17 Tigers	10	23	10	14	57
Bulldogs	7	3	14	0	24

at Ladd–Peebles Stadium • Mobile, AL

- Date: October 4
- Game time: 4:00 PM CDT
- Game weather: Cloudy • Temperature: 80 °F (27 °C) • Wind: E at 9 miles per hour (14 km/h)
- Game attendance: 14,517
- Referee: Charles Green
- TV announcers (HBCU Go): James Hadnot (play-by-play), Jon Kelley (analyst) and Lawrencia Moten (sideline)

Statistics	JKST	AAMU
First downs		
Total yards		
Rushing yards		
Passing yards		
Passing: Comp–Att–Int		
Time of possession		

Team	Category	Player	Statistics
Jackson State	Passing		
Jackson State	Rushing		
Jackson State	Receiving		
Alabama A&M	Passing		
Alabama A&M	Rushing		
Alabama A&M	Receiving		

=== Mississippi Valley State ===
Mississippi Valley State Delta Devils (0-4) vs. Alabama A&M Bulldogs (3-3) – Game summary

Quarter	1	2	3	4	Total
Delta Devils	9	7	3	6	25
Bulldogs	7	10	21	7	45

at Louis Crews Stadium • Huntsville, AL

- Date: October 11
- Game time: 2:00 PM CDT
- Game weather: Sunny
- Game attendance: 19,871
- Referee: Jarvis Walker
- TV announcers (SWAC TV): Mo Carter (play-by-play), Stan Becton (analyst) and Shavonne Herndon (sideline reporter)

Statistics	MVSU	AAMU
First downs		
Total yards		
Rushing yards		
Passing yards		
Passing: Comp–Att–Int		
Time of possession		

Team	Category	Player	Statistics
Mississippi Valley State	Passing		
Mississippi Valley State	Rushing		
Mississippi Valley State	Receiving		
Alabama A&M	Passing		
Alabama A&M	Rushing		
Alabama A&M	Receiving		

=== vs. Alabama State (Magic City Classic) ===
Alabama A&M Bulldogs (4-3) vs. Alabama State Hornets (4-2) – Game summary

Quarter	1	2	3	4	Total
Bulldogs	6	0	7	0	13
Hornets	21	28	7	0	56

at Legion Field • Birmingham, AL

- Date: October 25
- Game time: 2:30 PM CDT
- Game weather: Sunny • Temperature: 75 °F (24 °C) • Wind: E at 9 miles per hour (14 km/h)
- Game attendance: 69,372
- Referee: Preston Clipper
- TV announcers (ESPN+): Tiffany Greene (play-by-play) and Jay Walker (analyst)

Statistics	AAMU	ALST
First downs		
Total yards		
Rushing yards		
Passing yards		
Passing: Comp–Att–Int		
Time of possession		

Team	Category	Player	Statistics
Alabama A&M	Passing		
Alabama A&M	Rushing		
Alabama A&M	Receiving		
Alabama State	Passing		
Alabama State	Rushing		
Alabama State	Receiving		

=== at Grambling State ===
Alabama A&M Bulldogs (4-4) vs. Grambling State Tigers (4-4) – Game summary

Quarter	1	2	3	4	Total
Bulldogs	-	-	-	-	0
Tigers	-	-	-	-	0

at Eddie Robinson Stadium • Grambling, LA

- Date: November 1
- Game time: 2:00 PM CDT
- TV announcers (SWAC TV): Santoria Black (play-by-play) and Ossie Clark (analyst)

Statistics	AAMU	GRAM
First downs		
Total yards		
Rushing yards		
Passing yards		
Passing: Comp–Att–Int		
Time of possession		

Team	Category	Player	Statistics
Alabama A&M	Passing		
Alabama A&M	Rushing		
Alabama A&M	Receiving		
Grambling State	Passing		
Grambling State	Rushing		
Grambling State	Receiving		

=== Prairie View A&M ===
Prairie View A&M Panthers (6-3) vs. Alabama A&M Bulldogs (4-5) – Game summary

Quarter	1	2	3	4	Total
Panthers	-	-	-	-	0
Bulldogs	-	-	-	-	0

at Louis Crews Stadium • Huntsville, AL

- Date: November 8
- Game time: 2:00 PM CST
- TV announcers (SWAC TV): Mo Carter (play-by-play) and Reggie Flood (analyst)

Statistics	PV	AAMU
First downs		
Total yards		
Rushing yards		
Passing yards		
Passing: Comp–Att–Int		
Time of possession		

Team	Category	Player	Statistics
Prairie View A&M	Passing		
Prairie View A&M	Rushing		
Prairie View A&M	Receiving		
Alabama A&M	Passing		
Alabama A&M	Rushing		
Alabama A&M	Receiving		

=== Florida A&M ===
Florida A&M Rattlers (0-0) vs. Alabama A&M Bulldogs (0-0) – Game summary

Quarter	1	2	3	4	Total
Rattlers	-	-	-	-	0
Bulldogs	-	-	-	-	0

at Louis Crews Stadium • Huntsville, AL

- Date: November 15
- Game time: 2:00 PM CST
- TV announcers (ESPN+): Mo Carter (play by play) and Stan Becton (analyst)

Statistics	FAMU	AAMU
First downs		
Total yards		
Rushing yards		
Passing yards		
Passing: Comp–Att–Int		
Time of possession		

Team	Category	Player	Statistics
Florida A&M	Passing		
Florida A&M	Rushing		
Florida A&M	Receiving		
Alabama A&M	Passing		
Alabama A&M	Rushing		
Alabama A&M	Receiving		

=== at Texas Southern ===
Alabama A&M Bulldogs (0-0) vs. Texas Southern Tigers (0-0) – Game summary

Quarter	1	2	3	4	Total
Bulldogs	-	-	-	-	0
Tigers	-	-	-	-	0

at Shell Energy Stadium • Houston, TX

- Date: November 22
- Game time: 2:00 PM CST
- TV announcers (HBCU Go): James Hadnot (play by play), Jon Kelley (analyst) and Lawrencia Moten (sideline reporter)

Statistics	AAMU	TXSO
First downs		
Total yards		
Rushing yards		
Passing yards		
Passing: Comp–Att–Int		
Time of possession		

Team	Category	Player	Statistics
Alabama A&M	Passing		
Alabama A&M	Rushing		
Alabama A&M	Receiving		
Texas Southern	Passing		
Texas Southern	Rushing		
Texas Southern	Receiving		
