= Andrew Body =

American football player

No. 1 – Alabama State Hornets
- Position: Quarterback
- Class: Redshirt Senior

Personal information
- Listed height: 6 ft 1 in (1.85 m)
- Listed weight: 210 lb (95 kg)

Career information
- High school: Roy Miller (Corpus Christi, Texas)
- College: Texas Southern (2021–2023); Alabama State (2024–present)
- Stats at ESPN

Andrew Body is an American football quarterback for the Alabama State Hornets. He previously played for the Texas Southern Tigers.

== Early life ==
Body began playing football at the age of five and eventually played for Roy Miller High School in Corpus Christi, Texas. He totaled 13,151 passing yards across his entire high school career. In his senior year, Body led the team to the state quarterfinals for the first time since 1963, and finished the season with 4,389 passing yards and 1,506 rushing yards.

== College career ==
=== Texas Southern ===
Body signed with Texas Southern in February 2021. He played 10 games in the 2021 season, throwing for 2,017 yards, ten touchdowns, and four interceptions. Body also led the team in rushing yards, with 642 yards and five touchdowns.

Body netted 1,286 passing yards with eight touchdowns across the first eight games of the 2022 season. He missed most of 2023 following an injury the previous year. Body stated that he was healthy by the end of the season, but chose to redshirt anyway.

=== Alabama State ===
Body transferred to Alabama State in 2024, where he was expected to be the starting quarterback. However, he suffered a season-ending shoulder injury early in the season after leading the conference in rushing yards during the first week. He returned in 2025 and played as the starting quarterback until receiving an arm injury in November. He missed the final four games of the season, but was named as the SWAC offensive player of the year. Body threw for a total of 1,770 yards and 20 touchdowns in 2025.

Body initially entered the transfer portal and received offers from several schools, but ultimately stayed with Alabama State.
