= 2020 Jackson State Tigers football team =

American college football season

2020 Jackson State Tigers football
- Conference: Southwestern Athletic Conference
- East Division
- Record: 4–3 (3–2 SWAC)
- Head coach: Deion Sanders (1st season)
- Offensive coordinator: Michael Pollock (1st season)
- Co-offensive coordinator: Jason Phillips (1st season)
- Offensive scheme: Run and shoot
- Defensive coordinator: Dennis Thurman (1st season)
- Base defense: 3–4
- Home stadium: Mississippi Veterans Memorial Stadium

2020 Southwestern Athletic Conference football standings
	Conf.			Overall
Team	W		L	W		L
East Division
No. 24 Alabama A&M x$	3	–	0	5	–	0
Alabama State	3	–	2	3	–	3
Jackson State	3	–	2	4	–	3
Mississippi Valley State	1	–	3	1	–	3
West Division
Arkansas–Pine Bluff x	4	–	0	4	–	1
Southern	4	–	1	5	–	1
Prairie View A&M*	2	–	1	2	–	1
Texas Southern	1	–	2	1	–	2
Grambling State	0	–	4	0	–	4
Championship: Alabama A&M 40, Arkansas–Pine Bluff 33
$ – Conference champion; x – Division champion/co-champions; Note: The SWAC played a spring conference-only schedule (February–May 2021) due to COVID-19 pandemic. Alcorn State opted out of the spring season; all of their scheduled games were counted as forfeit wins for their opponents. * – Ineligible for FCS postseason play due to NCAA sanctions.; Rankings from STATS Poll

The 2020 Jackson State Tigers football team represented Jackson State University in the 2020–21 NCAA Division I FCS football season. The Tigers were led by Pro Football Hall of Famer and first-year head coach Deion Sanders and played their home games at Mississippi Veterans Memorial Stadium in Jackson, Mississippi as members of the East Division of the Southwestern Athletic Conference (SWAC).

On July 20, 2020, the Southwestern Athletic Conference announced that it would not play fall sports due to the COVID-19 pandemic, which includes the football program. The conference ultimately moved its football schedule to the 2021 spring semester.

== Schedule ==
Due to the SWAC's postponement of the 2020 football season to spring 2021, games against Florida A&M, Langston, Southern Miss, and Tennessee State were canceled. The SWAC released updated spring schedules on August 17.

Date	Time	Opponent	Site	TV	Result	Attendance
February 21	1:00 p.m.	Edward Waters*	Mississippi Veterans Memorial Stadium; Jackson, MS	ESPN3	W 53–0	11,000
March 6	12:00 p.m.	at Grambling State	Eddie Robinson Stadium; Grambling, LA	ESPN3	W 33–28	6,340
March 14	2:00 p.m.	Mississippi Valley State	Mississippi Veterans Memorial Stadium; Jackson, MS	ESPN2	W 43–7	22,000
March 20	3:00 p.m.	at Alabama State	New ASU Stadium; Montgomery, AL	ESPN2	L 28–35	5,908
April 3	4:00 p.m.	Southern*	Mississippi Veterans Memorial Stadium; Jackson, MS (Boombox Classic)	ESPN	L 14–34	22,000
April 10	2:00 p.m.	Alabama A&M	Mississippi Veterans Memorial Stadium; Jackson, MS	ESPN	L 43–52	20,051
April 17		at Alcorn State	Casem-Spinks Stadium; Lorman, MS (Soul Bowl)		W 2–0 (forfeit)	
*Non-conference game; All times are in Central time

== Staff ==
Name	Position	Consecutive season at Jackson State in current position
Deion Sanders	Head Coach	1st
Otis Riddley	Director of player personnel	1st
Michael Pollock	Co-offensive coordinator/quarterbacks	1st
Jason Phillips	Co-offensive coordinator/wide receivers coach	1st
Dennis Thurman	Defensive coordinator	1st
Alan Ricard	Special teams coordinator	1st
T.C. Taylor	Tight ends coach	2nd
Mike Markuson	Offensive line coach	1st
Gary Harrell	Running Backs Coach	1st
Jeff Weeks	Defensive line coach	1st
Andre' Hart	Linebackers Coach	1st
Kevin Mathis	Defensive backs coach	1st

== Game summaries ==
=== Edward Waters ===
Edward Waters at Jackson State

Team	1	2	3	4	Total
EWU Tigers	0	0	0	0	0
• JSU Tigers	10	21	6	16	53

- Date: February 21, 2021
- Location: Mississippi Veterans Memorial Stadium
  Jackson, MS
- Game start: 1:00 p.m. CST
- Elapsed time: 3:20
- Game attendance: 11,000
- Game weather: 52 °F (11 °C) • Weather: Sunny • Wind: SSE 18 MPH
- TV announcers (ESPN3): Santoria Black (play-by-play) and Deuce McAllister (analyst)

Scoring summary
1	11:36	JSU	Warren Newman 6-yard pass from Jalon Jones (Glenn Misiak kick) (6 plays, 40 yards, 2:15)	JSU 7–0
1	04:35	JSU	Glenn Misiak 23-yard field goal (11 plays, 50 yards, 5:17)	JSU 10–0
2	14:09	JSU	Kymani Clarke 8-yard rush (Glenn Misiak kick)br/>(9 play, 62 yards, 3:41)	JSU 17–0
2	01:07	JSU	Jalon Jones 6-yard rush (Glenn Misiak kick) (2 plays, 30 yards, 0:46)	JSU 24–0
2	00:11	JSU	Daylen Baldwin 10-yard pass from Jalon Jones (Glenn Misiak kick) (4 plays, 44 yards, 0:44)	JSU 31–0
3	11:55	JSU	Kymani Clarke 10-yard rush (Jalon Jones two-point conversion pass attempt failed) (7 plays, 47 yards, 2:56)	JSU 37–0
4	13:26	JSU	Greg Williams 1-yard rush (Glenn Misiak PAT failed) (5 plays, 30 yards, 1:34)	JSU 43–0
4	09:25	JSU	Noah Anderson 24-yard field goal (4 plays, 1 yard, 1:36)	JSU 46–0
4	09:20	JSU	Christian Allen 24-yard pass from Quincy Casey (Noah Anderson kick) (1 play, 24 yards, 0:05)	JSU 53–0

Statistics	Edward Waters	Jackson State
First downs	8	27
Total yards	104	435
Rushing yards	21	183
Passing yards	83	252
Turnovers	0	0
Time of possession	28:35	31:25

Team	Category	Player	Statistics
Edward Waters	Passing	Roshard Branch	9/21, 83 yards
Edward Waters	Rushing	De'Shaun Hugee	6 carries, 10 yards
Edward Waters	Receiving	Samuel Thompson	3 receptions, 28 yards
Jackson State	Passing	Jalon Jones	17/19, 163 yards, 2 TDs
Jackson State	Rushing	Kymani Clarke	18 carries, 92 yards, 2 TDs
Jackson State	Receiving	Warren Newman	8 receptions, 76 yards, 1 TD

=== At Grambling State ===
Jackson State at Grambling State

Team	1	2	3	4	Total
• JSU Tigers	7	20	0	6	33
GRAM Tigers	14	0	7	7	28

- Date: March 6, 2021
- Location: Eddie Robinson Stadium
  Grambling, LA
- Game start: 12:00 p.m. CST
- Elapsed time: 3:58
- Game attendance: 6,340
- Game weather: 60 °F (16 °C)
- TV announcers (ESPN3): Tiffany Greene (play-by-play) and Jay Walker (analyst)

Scoring summary
1	11:34	JSU	Corey Reed Jr. 13-yard pass from Jalon Jones (Noah Anderson kick) (3 plays, 10 yards, 1:17)	JSU 7–0
1	08:04	GRAM	Geremy Hickbottom 2-yard rush (Garrett Urban kick) (9 plays, 61 yards, 3:23)	TIE 7–7
1	04:07	GRAM	Keilon Elder 1-yard rush (Garrett Urban kick)br/>(7 play, 51 yards, 2:30)	GRAM 14–7
2	10:48	JSU	Jalon Jones 4-yard rush (Noah Anderson PAT failed) (9 plays, 67 yards, 4:02)	GRAM 14–13
2	09:05	JSU	Daylen Baldwin 64-yard pass from Jalon Jones (Glenn Misiak kick) (2 plays, 68 yards, 0:44)	JSU 20–14
2	05:00	JSU	Tyson Alexander 33-yard rush (Glenn Misiak kick) (5 plays, 62 yards, 1:39)	JSU 27–14
3	08:50	GRAM	Darrell Clark 15-yard pass from Geremy Hickbottom (Garrett Urban kick) (11 plays, 67 yards, 4:00)	JSU 27–21
4	13:55	GRAM	Keilon Elder 2-yard rush (Garrett Urban kick) (16 plays, 80 yard, 5:45)	GRAM 28–27
4	12:35	JSU	Warren Newman 20-yard pass from Jalon Jones (Noah Anderson PAT failed) (4 plays, 50 yards, 1:13)	JSU 33–28

Statistics	Jackson State	Grambling State
First downs	21	29
Total yards	473	422
Rushing yards	293	182
Passing yards	180	240
Turnovers	2	1
Time of possession	28:06	31:54

Team	Category	Player	Statistics
Jackson State	Passing	Jalon Jones	12/18, 180 yards, 3 TDs
Jackson State	Rushing	Tyson Alexander	17 carries, 184 yards, 1 TD
Jackson State	Receiving	Daylen Baldwin	4 receptions, 95 yards, 1 TD
Grambling State	Passing	Geremy Hickbottom	24/35, 237 yards, 1 TD
Grambling State	Rushing	Geremy Hickbottom	16 carries, 81 yards, 1 TD
Grambling State	Receiving	Dorrell James	6 receptions, 87 yards

=== Mississippi Valley State ===
Mississippi Valley State at Jackson State

Team	1	2	3	4	Total
Delta Devils	0	0	0	7	7
• Tigers	7	23	0	13	43

- Date: March 14, 2021
- Location: Mississippi Veterans Memorial Stadium
  Jackson, MS
- Game start: 2:00 p.m. CST
- Elapsed time: 3 hours and 34 minutes
- Game attendance: 22,000
- Game weather: 79 °F (26 °C) • Weather: Cloudy • Wind: N 11 MPH
- Television network: ESPN2

Scoring summary
1	08:17	JSU	Jalon Jones 19-yard rush (Glenn Misiak kick) (13 plays, 95 yards, 5:14)	JSU 7–0
2	14:00	JSU	Daylen Baldwin 30-yard pass from Jalon Jones (Glenn Misiak PAT failed) (9 plays, 79 yards, 3:30)	JSU 13–0
2	09:55	JSU	Daylen Baldwin 38-yard pass from Jalon Jones (Jalon Jones two-point conversion pass to Kyland Richey)br/>(3 play, 62 yards, 0:53)	JSU 21–0
2	07:47	JSU	Daylen Baldwin 20-yard pass form Jalon Jones (two-point conversion rush failed) (2 plays, 20 yards, 0:17)	JSU 27–0
2	04:40	JSU	Noah Anderson 29-yard field goal (5 plays, 29 yards, 2:22)	JSU 30–0
4	04:20	MVSU	Jalani Eason 11-yard rush (Orlando Fernandez kick) (3 plays, 24 yards, 1:30)	JSU 30–7
4	01:34	JSU	Quincy Casey 2-yard rush (Glenn Misiak kick) (8 plays, 58 yards, 2:44)	JSU 37–7
4	00:25	JSU	Jaumonie Crain 26-yard fumble returned (Glenn Misiak PAT failed) (1 play, -9 yards, 0:10)	JSU 43–7

Statistics	Mississippi Valley State	Jackson State
First downs	15	21
Total yards	271	456
Rushing yards	147	153
Passing yards	124	303
Turnovers	4	2
Time of possession	34:08	25:52

Team	Category	Player	Statistics
Mississippi Valley State	Passing	Jalani Eason	17/34, 117 yards, 1 INT
Mississippi Valley State	Rushing	Darius Williams	9 carries, 65 yards
Mississippi Valley State	Receiving	Jarius Clayton	5 receptions, 35 yards
Jackson State	Passing	Jalon Jones	14/27, 250 yards, 3 TDs
Jackson State	Rushing	Tyson Alexander	6 carries, 136 yards, 3 TDs
Jackson State	Receiving	Daylen Baldwin	6 receptions, 136 yards, 3 TDs

=== At Alabama State ===
Jackson State at Alabama State

Team	1	2	3	4	Total
Tigers	0	6	15	7	28
• Hornets	0	14	0	21	35

- Date: March 20, 2021
- Location: New ASU Stadium
  Montgomery, AL
- Game start: 3:07 p.m. CDT
- Elapsed time: 3 hours and 51 minutes
- Game attendance: 5,908
- Game weather: 61 °F (16 °C) • Weather: Partly Cloudy • Wind: NE 7 MPH
- Referee: Tony Ross
- Television network: ESPN2

Scoring summary
2	10:01	JSU	Glenn Misiak 31-yard field goal (7 plays, 14 yards, 1:46)	JSU 3–0
2	06:57	ALST	Jeremiah Hixon 35-yard pass from Ryan Nettles (Hunter Hanson kick) (6 plays, 78 yards, 2:59)	ALST 7–3
2	04:37	JSU	Glenn Misiak 22-yard field goal (6 plays, 20 yards, 1:54)	ALST 7–6
2	08:21	ALST	Jahod Booker 8-yard pass from Ryan Nettles (Hunter Hanson kick) (12 plays, 89 yards, 4:00)	ALST 14–6
3	08:26	JSU	Team Safety (2 plays, -1 yards, 1:04)	ALST 14–8
3	04:48	JSU	Corey Reed Jr. 17-yard pass from Jalon Jones (Glenn Misiak kick) (8 plays, 50 yards, 3:38)	JSU 15–14
3	04:04	JSU	Jalon Jones 3-yard rush (two-point conversion pass attempt failed) (3 plays, 4 yards, 0:23)	JSU 21–14
4	10:50	ALST	Ezra Gray 4-yard rush (Hunter Hanson kick) (10 plays, 95 yards, 3:58)	TIE 21–21
4	06:53	ALST	Ezra Gray 49-yard rush (Hunter Hanson kick) (6 plays, 86 yards, 2:43)	ALST 28–21
4	01:42	JSU	Jalon Jones 2-yard rush (Glenn Misiak kick) (14 plays, 67 yards, 5:04)	TIE 28–28
4	01:29	ALST	Ezra Gray 50-yard rush (Hunter Hanson kick) (1 play, 50 yards, 0:09)	ALST 35–28

Statistics	Jackson State	Alabama State
First downs	24	21
Total yards	350	466
Rushing yards	170	209
Passing yards	180	257
Turnovers	2	3
Time of possession	29:56	30:04

Team	Category	Player	Statistics
Jackson State	Passing	Jalon Jones	19/50, 180 yards, 1 TD, 2 INTs
Jackson State	Rushing	Jalon Jones	22 carries, 94 yards, 2 TDs
Jackson State	Receiving	Corey Reed Jr.	8 receptions, 99 yards, 1 TD
Alabama State	Passing	Ryan Nettles	27/42, 257 yards, 2 TDs, 2 INTs
Alabama State	Rushing	Ezra Gray	23 carries, 195 yards, 3 TDs
Alabama State	Receiving	Michael Jefferson	8 receptions, 76 yards

=== Southern ===
Southern at Jackson State

Team	1	2	3	4	Total
• Jaguars	7	10	10	7	34
Tigers	0	7	0	7	14

- Date: April 3, 2021
- Location: Mississippi Veterans Memorial Stadium
  Jackson, MS
- Game start: 4:00 p.m. CDT
- Elapsed time: 3 hours and 7 minutes
- Game attendance: 22,000
- Game weather: 68 °F (20 °C) • Weather: Sunny • Wind: 3 MPH
- Television network: ESPN

Scoring summary
1	10:01	SOU	Devon Benn 1-yard rush (Cesar Barajas kick) (11 plays, 70 yards, 4:59)	SOU 7–0
2	12:43	SOU	Cesar Barajas 30-yard field goal (11 plays, 51 yards, 4:54)	SOU 10–0
2	06:48	JSU	Daylen Baldwin 75-yard pass from Jalon Jones (Glenn Misiak kick)br/>(1 play, 75 yards, 0:11)	SOU 10–7
2	00:08	SOU	Corey Williams 20-yard pass from John Lampley (Cesar Barajas kick) (5 plays, 54 yards, 0:37)	SOU 17–7
3	11:07	SOU	Cesar Barajas 49-yard field goal (7 plays, 28 yards, 3:00)	SOU 20–7
3	04:21	SOU	Devon Benn 20-yard rush (Cesar Barajas kick) (9 plays, 93 yards, 4:09)	SOU 27–7
4	14:55	JSU	Corey Reed Jr. 18-yard pass from Jalon Jones (Glenn Misiak kick) (13 plays, 82 yards, 4:26)	SOU 27–14
4	11:35	SOU	Ladarius Skelton 2-yard rush (Cesar Barajas kick) (1 play, 2 yards, 0:04)	SOU 34–14

Statistics	Southern	Jackson State
First downs	26	16
Total yards	474	309
Rushing yards	294	66
Passing yards	180	243
Turnovers	2	1
Time of possession	42:49	17:11

Team	Category	Player	Statistics
Southern	Passing	John Lampley	9/14, 116 yards, 1 TD
Southern	Rushing	Jerodd Sims	17 carries, 79 yards
Southern	Receiving	Ethan Howard	4 receptions, 54 yards
Jackson State	Passing	Jalon Jones	17/29, 243 yards, 2 TDs, 1 INT
Jackson State	Rushing	Tyson Alexander	8 carries, 38 yards
Jackson State	Receiving	Daylen Baldwin	3 receptions, 91 yards, 1 TD

=== Alabama A&M ===
Alabama A&M at Jackson State

Team	1	2	3	4	Total
• Bulldogs	7	21	10	14	52
Tigers	7	14	7	15	43

- Date: April 10, 2021
- Location: Mississippi Veterans Memorial Stadium
  Jackson, MS
- Game start: 2:00 p.m. CDT
- Elapsed time: 3 hours and 37 minutes
- Game attendance: 20,051
- Game weather: 75 °F (24 °C) • Weather: Mostly Clear • Wind: WSW 13 MPH
- Television network: ESPN

Scoring summary
1	11:50	AAMU	Abdul-Fatai Ibrahim 9-yard pass from Aqeel Glass (Spencer Corey kick) (9 plays, 74 yards, 3:10)	AAMU 7–0
1	02:33	JSU	Warren Newman 6-yard rush (Glenn Misiak kick) (8 plays, 66 yards, 3:29)	TIE 7–7
2	13:37	JSU	Santee Marshall 54-yard rush (Glenn Misiak kick)br/>(3 play, 65 yards, 1:10)	JSU 14–7
2	12:14	AAMU	Gary Quarles 43-yard pass from Aqeel Glass (Spencer Corey kick) (4 plays, 65 yards, 1:23)	TIE 14–14
2	08:04	AAMU	Aqeel Glass 5-yard rush (Spencer Corey kick) (6 plays, 48 yards, 2:46)	AAMU 21–14
2	04:32	JSU	Warren Newman 17-yard pass from Quincy Casey (Glenn Misiak kick) (8 plays, 53 yards, 3:21)	TIE 21–21
2	03:45	AAMU	Zabrian Moore 61-yard pass from Aqeel Glass (Spencer Corey kick) (2 plays, 80 yards, 0:38)	AAMU 28–21
3	12:04	AAMU	Odieu Hilaire 11-yard pass from Aqeel Glass (Spencer Corey kick) (4 plays, 70 yards, 1:22)	AAMU 35–21
3	09:49	JSU	Daylen Baldwin 24-yard pass from Quincy Casey (Glenn Misiak kick) (5 plays, 61 yards, 2:08)	AAMU 35–28
3	03:41	AAMU	Spencer Corey 34-yard field goal (8 plays, 33 yards, 3:02)	AAMU 38–28
4	14:29	AAMU	Abdul-Fatai Ibrahim 25-yard pass from Aqeel Glass (Spencer Corey kick) (7 plays, 75 yards, 2:25)	AAMU 45–28
4	06:59	JSU	Warren Newman 7-yard pass from Quincy Casey (Glenn Misiak kick) (11 plays, 79 yards, 3:51)	AAMU 45–35
4	02:49	AAMU	Anthony Howard 4-yard pass from Aqeel Glass (Spencer Corey kick) (10 plays, 75 yards, 4:10)	AAMU 52–35
4	01:29	JSU	Warren Newman 7-yard pass from Quincy Casey (Quincy Casey two-point conversion pass to Corey Reed Jr.) (5 plays, 67 yards, 1:13)	AAMU 52–43

Statistics	Alabama A&M	Jackson State
First downs	28	26
Total yards	533	463
Rushing yards	93	140
Passing yards	440	323
Turnovers	0	0
Time of possession	29:12	30:48

Team	Category	Player	Statistics
Alabama A&M	Passing	Aqeel Glass	27/40, 440 yards, 6 TDs
Alabama A&M	Rushing	Gary Quarles	16 carries, 86 yards
Alabama A&M	Receiving	Zabrian Moore	4 receptions, 114 yards, 1 TD
Jackson State	Passing	Quincy Casey	30/47, 323 yards, 4 TDs
Jackson State	Rushing	Santee Marshall	19 carries, 126 yards, 1 TD
Jackson State	Receiving	Daylen Baldwin	6 receptions, 135 yards, 1 TD
