= 2020 Southern Jaguars football team =

American college football season

2020 Southern Jaguars football
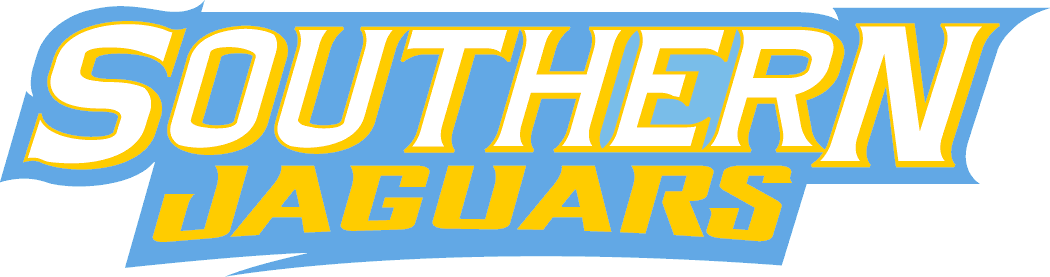
- Conference: Southwestern Athletic Conference
- West Division

Ranking
- FCS Coaches: No. 19
- Record: 5–1 (4–1 SWAC)
- Head coach: Dawson Odums (8th season)
- Home stadium: Ace W. Mumford Stadium

2020 Southwestern Athletic Conference football standings
| | Conf. | | | Overall |
| Team | W | | L | W | | L |
|---|---|---|---|---|---|---|
East Division
| No. 24 Alabama A&M x$ | 3 | – | 0 | 5 | – | 0 |
| Alabama State | 3 | – | 2 | 3 | – | 3 |
| Jackson State | 3 | – | 2 | 4 | – | 3 |
| Mississippi Valley State | 1 | – | 3 | 1 | – | 3 |
West Division
| Arkansas–Pine Bluff x | 4 | – | 0 | 4 | – | 1 |
| Southern | 4 | – | 1 | 5 | – | 1 |
| Prairie View A&M* | 2 | – | 1 | 2 | – | 1 |
| Texas Southern | 1 | – | 2 | 1 | – | 2 |
| Grambling State | 0 | – | 4 | 0 | – | 4 |
Championship: Alabama A&M 40, Arkansas–Pine Bluff 33
$ – Conference champion; x – Division champion/co-champions; Note: The SWAC played a spring conference-only schedule (February–May 2021) due to COVID-19 pandemic. Alcorn State opted out of the spring season; all of their scheduled games were counted as forfeit wins for their opponents. * – Ineligible for FCS postseason play due to NCAA sanctions.; Rankings from STATS Poll

The 2020 Southern Jaguars football team represented Southern University in the 2020–21 NCAA Division I FCS football season. The Jaguars were led by eighth-year head coach Dawson Odums and played their home games at Ace W. Mumford Stadium in Baton Rouge, Louisiana as members of the West Division of the Southwestern Athletic Conference (SWAC).

On July 20, 2020, the Southwestern Athletic Conference announced that it would not play fall sports due to the COVID-19 pandemic, which included the football program. The conference is formalizing plans to conduct a competitive schedule for football during the 2021 spring semester.

== Preseason ==
=== Recruiting class ===
College recruiting information (2020)
| Name | Hometown | School | Height | Weight | 40^{‡} | Commit date |
|---|---|---|---|---|---|---|
| Antonio Smith; Offensive Tackle | Ocala, FL | Van Guard HS | 6 ft 3 in (1.91 m) | 305 lb (138 kg) | - | Feb 5, 2020 |
| Antonio Smith; Offensive Tackle | Recruit ratings: Scout: Rivals: 247Sports: ESPN: | | | | | |
| Andre Jones; Defensive End | Ocala, FL | Van Guard HS | 6 ft 4 in (1.93 m) | 197 lb (89 kg) | - | Feb 5, 2020 |
| Andre Jones; Defensive End | Recruit ratings: Scout: Rivals: 247Sports: ESPN: | | | | | |
| Luke Rose; Free Safety | Citra, FL | North Marion HS | 6 ft 2 in (1.88 m) | 180 lb (82 kg) | - | Feb 5, 2020 |
| Luke Rose; Free Safety | Recruit ratings: Scout: Rivals: 247Sports: ESPN: | | | | | |
| Ethan Howard; Tight End | Cecilia, LA | Cecilia HS | 6 ft 4 in (1.93 m) | 225 lb (102 kg) | - | Feb 5, 2020 |
| Ethan Howard; Tight End | Recruit ratings: Scout: Rivals: 247Sports: ESPN: | | | | | |
| Carline Davis; Free Safety | Marrero, LA | Higgins HS | 5 ft 10 in (1.78 m) | 165 lb (75 kg) | - | Feb 5, 2020 |
| Carline Davis; Free Safety | Recruit ratings: Scout: Rivals: 247Sports: ESPN: | | | | | |
| Tikey Reese; Defensive Tackle | Monroe, LA | Neville HS | 6 ft 2 in (1.88 m) | 270 lb (120 kg) | - | Feb 5, 2020 |
| Tikey Reese; Defensive Tackle | Recruit ratings: Scout: Rivals: 247Sports: ESPN: | | | | | |
| Marquis Martin; Defensive End | New Orleans, LA | John Curtis HS | 6 ft 2 in (1.88 m) | 240 lb (110 kg) | - | Feb 5, 2020 |
| Marquis Martin; Defensive End | Recruit ratings: Scout: Rivals: 247Sports: ESPN: | | | | | |
| Tyquez Hampton; Wide Receiver | El Paso, TX | Chapin HS; El Dorado HS; Utah; Coffeyville CC | 6 ft 3 in (1.91 m) | 208 lb (94 kg) | - | Dec 19, 2019 |
| Tyquez Hampton; Wide Receiver | Recruit ratings: Scout: Rivals: 247Sports: ESPN: | | | | | |
| Amauchechukwu Nnaji–Collins; Defensive End | Destrehan, LA | Miami ASA | 6 ft 4 in (1.93 m) | 220 lb (100 kg) | - | Dec 19, 2019 |
| Amauchechukwu Nnaji–Collins; Defensive End | Recruit ratings: Scout: Rivals: 247Sports: ESPN: | | | | | |
| Shamar Zaragoza; Wide Receiver | Miami, FL | Miami Central HS | 6 ft 0 in (1.83 m) | 170 lb (77 kg) | - | Dec 19, 2019 |
| Shamar Zaragoza; Wide Receiver | Recruit ratings: Scout: Rivals: 247Sports: ESPN: | | | | | |
| Derrick Williams; Linebacker | Miami, FL | Miami Central HS | 6 ft 0 in (1.83 m) | 215 lb (98 kg) | - | Dec 19, 2019 |
| Derrick Williams; Linebacker | Recruit ratings: Scout: Rivals: 247Sports: ESPN: | | | | | |
| Letrelle Johnson; Nose Tackle | Hattiesburg, MS | Hattiesburg HS; Southwest Mississippi CC | 6 ft 1 in (1.85 m) | 290 lb (130 kg) | - | Dec 19, 2019 |
| Letrelle Johnson; Nose Tackle | Recruit ratings: Scout: Rivals: 247Sports: ESPN: | | | | | |
| Dakota Masters; Long Snapper | Seminary, MS | Seminary HS; Jones CC | 5 ft 10 in (1.78 m) | 196 lb (89 kg) | - | Dec 19, 2019 |
| Dakota Masters; Long Snapper | Recruit ratings: Scout: Rivals: 247Sports: ESPN: | | | | | |
| Ronell Burbank; Defensive Tackle | New Orleans, LA | Edna Karr HS; McNeese State; Mississippi Gulf Coast CC | 6 ft 2 in (1.88 m) | 185 lb (84 kg) | - | Dec 19, 2019 |
| Ronell Burbank; Defensive Tackle | Recruit ratings: Scout: Rivals: 247Sports: ESPN: | | | | | |
| Rahem Shorter; Linebacker | Pattison, MS | Port Gibson HS; Jones CC | 6 ft 0 in (1.83 m) | 196 lb (89 kg) | - | Dec 19, 2019 |
| Rahem Shorter; Linebacker | Recruit ratings: Scout: Rivals: 247Sports: ESPN: | | | | | |
| Jadyn Landrum; Linebacker | Grand Prairie, TX | Bowie HS | 6 ft 0 in (1.83 m) | 220 lb (100 kg) | - | Dec 19, 2019 |
| Jadyn Landrum; Linebacker | Recruit ratings: Scout: Rivals: 247Sports: ESPN: | | | | | |

=== Preseason polls ===
The SWAC will release their polls in July 2020.

West Division
| Predicted finish | Team | Votes |
|---|---|---|
| 1 | | |
| 2 | | |
| 3 | | |
| 4 | | |
| 5 | | |

East Division
| Predicted finish | Team | Votes |
|---|---|---|
| 1 | | |
| 2 | | |
| 3 | | |
| 4 | | |
| 5 | | |

=== Preseason all–SWAC teams ===
Offense

Defense

== Schedule ==
The 2020 schedule originally consisted of 5 home, 3 away, and 3 neutral site games in the regular season. The Tigers will travel to SWAC foes Alabama A&M, Alabama State, and Prairie View A&M. The Tigers will play host to SWAC foes Jackson State, Alcorn State, and Arkansas–Pine Bluff. The Tigers will play two neutral site conference games—the Dallas State Fair Showdown against Texas Southern at the Cotton Bowl in Dallas, TX and the Bayou Classic against Grambling State at the Mercedes-Benz Superdome in New Orleans, LA.

Due to the SWAC's postponement of the 2020 football season to spring 2021, games against Florida A&M, Florida Memorial, Morehouse, and Tennessee State were canceled.

Southern's revised schedule, released by the conference on August 17, will feature six games; 2 home, 3 away, and 1 at a neutral site.

| Date | Time | Opponent | Site | TV | Result | Attendance |
|---|---|---|---|---|---|---|
| February 26 | 6:00 p.m. | at Alabama State | New ASU Stadium; Montgomery, AL | ESPN3 | W 24–21 | 5,654 |
| March 6 | 1:30 p.m. | Arkansas–Pine Bluff | A. W. Mumford Stadium; Baton Rouge, LA | ESPN3 | L 30–33 | 0 |
| March 20 | 7:30 p.m. | at Texas Southern | BBVA Stadium; Houston, TX | AT&TSN | W 51–23 | 0 |
| March 27 | | Alcorn State | A. W. Mumford Stadium; Baton Rouge, LA | | W 2–0 (forfeit) | |
| April 3 | 4:00 p.m. | at Jackson State | Mississippi Veterans Memorial Stadium; Jackson, MS (Boombox Classic) | ESPN | W 34–14 | 22,000 |
| April 17 | 1:30 p.m. | vs. Grambling State | Independence Stadium; Shreveport, LA (Bayou Classic) | NBCSN | W 49–7 | 11,312 |
Rankings from STATS Poll released prior to the game; All times are in Central time

Schedule source:

== Game summaries ==
=== At Alabama State ===
Southern at Alabama State

| Team | 1 | 2 | 3 | 4 | Total |
|---|---|---|---|---|---|
| • Jaguars | 7 | 0 | 7 | 10 | 24 |
| Hornets | 0 | 7 | 14 | 0 | 21 |

- Date: February 26, 2021
- Location: New ASU Stadium
  Montgomery, AL
- Game start: 6:04 p.m. CST
- Elapsed time: 3 hours and 26 minutes
- Game attendance: 5,654
- Game weather: 74 °F (23 °C) • Weather: Mostly Cloudy • Wind: N 8 MPH
- Referee: Gary Leeper
- Television network: ESPN3

Scoring summary
| 1 | 11:17 | SOU | Chase Foster 14-yard interception returned (Cesar Barajas kick) (3 plays, 0 yards, 1:26) | SOU 7–0 |
| 2 | 01:08 | ALST | Jeremiah Hixon 32-yard pass from Ryan Nettles (Hunter Hanson kick) (8 plays, 60 yards, 3:48) | TIE 7–7 |
| 3 | 11:45 | SOU | Ladarius Skelton 8-yard rush (Cesar Barajas kick)br/>(7 play, 45 yards, 3:15) | SOU 14–7 |
| 3 | 08:21 | ALST | Michael Jefferson 14-yard pass from Ryan Nettles (Hunter Hanson kick) (8 plays, 70 yards, 3:24) | TIE 14–14 |
| 3 | 00:15 | ALST | Jacory Merritt 1-yard rush (Hunter Hanson kick) (3 plays, 5 yards, 1:22) | ALST 21–14 |
| 4 | 14:20 | SOU | Gregory Perkins 59-yard pass from Ladarius Skelton (Cesar Barajas kick) (3 plays, 74 yards, 0:55) | TIE 21–21 |
| 4 | 12:20 | SOU | Cesar Barajas 41-yard field goal (4 plays, 1 yard, 0:52) | SOU 24–21 |

| Statistics | Southern | Alabama State |
|---|---|---|
| First downs | 12 | 22 |
| Total yards | 274 | 274 |
| Rushing yards | 139 | 125 |
| Passing yards | 135 | 149 |
| Turnovers | 3 | 3 |
| Time of possession | 23:44 | 36:16 |

| Team | Category | Player | Statistics |
|---|---|---|---|
| Southern | Passing | Ladarius Skelton | 10/22, 135 yards, 1 TD |
| Southern | Rushing | Ladarius Skelton | 10 carries, 72 yards, 1 TD |
| Southern | Receiving | Gregory Perkins | 1 reception, 59 yards, 1 TD |
| Alabama State | Passing | Ryan Nettles | 16/27, 149 yards, 2 TDs, 1 INT |
| Alabama State | Rushing | Ezra Gray | 14 carries, 73 yards |
| Alabama State | Receiving | Michael Jefferson | 5 receptions, 47 yards, 1 TD |

=== Arkansas–Pine Bluff ===
Arkansas–Pine Bluff at Southern

| Team | 1 | 2 | 3 | 4 | Total |
|---|---|---|---|---|---|
| • Golden Lions | 3 | 23 | 7 | 0 | 33 |
| Jaguars | 7 | 7 | 3 | 13 | 30 |

- Date: March 6, 2021
- Location: Ace W. Mumford Stadium
  Baton Rouge, LA
- Game start: 1:36 p.m. CST
- Elapsed time: 3 hours and 33 minutes
- Game attendance: 0
- Game weather: 66 °F (19 °C) • Weather: Sunny • Wind: N 12 MPH
- Referee: Y. N. Meyers
- Television network: ESPN3

Scoring summary
| 1 | 12:20 | UAPB | Zach Piwniczka 35-yard field goal (8 plays, 37 yards, 2:30) | UAPB 3–0 |
| 1 | 01:07 | SOU | Jarod Sims 23-yard rush (Cesar Barajas kick) (15 plays, 98 yards, 6:53) | SOU 7–3 |
| 2 | 12:42 | UAPB | Skyler Perry 31-yard rush (Zach Piwniczka kick)br/>(3 play, 46 yards, 0:43) | UAPB 10–7 |
| 2 | 08:02 | SOU | Marquis McClain 13-yard pass from John Lampley (Cesar Barajas kick) (10 plays, 75 yards, 4:40) | SOU 14–10 |
| 2 | 05:19 | UAPB | Team Safety (0 plays, 0 yards, 0:00) | SOU 14–12 |
| 2 | 02:38 | UAPB | Josh Wilkes 14-yard pass from Skyler Perry (Zach Piwniczka kick) (7 plays, 60 yards, 2:41) | UAPB 19–14 |
| 2 | 00:02 | UAPB | Harry Ballard III 2-yard pass from Skyler Perry (Zach Piwniczka kick) (8 plays, 76 yards, 1:50) | UAPB 26–14 |
| 3 | 07:08 | UABP | Skyler Perry 2-yard rush (Zach Piwniczka kick) (12 play, 70 yards, 5:19) | UAPB 33–14 |
| 3 | 00:56 | SOU | Cesar Barajas 36-yard field goal (4 plays, 4 yards, 1:26) | UAPB 33–17 |
| 4 | 14:09 | SOU | Jamel Byrd 17-yard punt returned (two-point conversion pass attempt failed) (0 plays, 0 yards, 0:00) | UAPB 33–23 |
| 4 | 07:12 | SOU | Jarod Sims 9-yard pass from John Lampley (Cesar Barajas kick) (9 plays, 80 yards, 3:03) | UAPB 33–30 |

| Statistics | Arkansas–Pine Bluff | Southern |
|---|---|---|
| First downs | 20 | 23 |
| Total yards | 411 | 426 |
| Rushing yards | 188 | 134 |
| Passing yards | 223 | 292 |
| Turnovers | 0 | 4 |
| Time of possession | 30:26 | 29:34 |

| Team | Category | Player | Statistics |
|---|---|---|---|
| Arkansas–Pine Bluff | Passing | Skyler Perry | 22/37, 223 yards, 2 TDs |
| Arkansas–Pine Bluff | Rushing | Skyler Perry | 8 carries, 58 yards, 2 TDs |
| Arkansas–Pine Bluff | Receiving | Tyrin Ralph | 7 receptions, 86 yards |
| Southern | Passing | John Lampley | 20/33, 238 yards, 2 TDs, 3 INTs |
| Southern | Rushing | Jarod Sims | 11 carries, 55 yards, 1 TD |
| Southern | Receiving | Brandon Hinton | 3 receptions, 60 yards |

=== At Texas Southern ===
Southern at Texas Southern

| Team | 1 | 2 | 3 | 4 | Total |
|---|---|---|---|---|---|
| • Jaguars | 9 | 14 | 14 | 14 | 51 |
| Tigers | 7 | 7 | 0 | 9 | 23 |

- Date: March 20, 2021
- Location: BBVA Stadium
  Houston, TX
- Game start: 7:30 p.m. CDT
- Elapsed time: 3 hours and 15 minutes
- Game attendance: 0
- Game weather: 66 °F (19 °C) • Weather: Clear • Wind: ENE 11 MPH
- Referee: Scott Johnson
- Television network: AT&T SportsNet

Scoring summary
| 1 | 09:14 | SOU | Ethan Howard 38-yard pass from Ladarius Skelton (Cesar Barajas kick) (8 plays, 70 yards, 3:21) | SOU 7–0 |
| 1 | 08:00 | SOU | Team Safety (3 plays, -19 yards, 1:08) | SOU 9–0 |
| 1 | 00:26 | TXSO | Jacorey Howard 3-yard rush (Richard Garcia III kick)br/>(14 play, 87 yards, 4:57) | SOU 9–7 |
| 2 | 13:32 | SOU | Jerodd Sims 22-yard pass from John Lampley (Cesar Barajas kick) (5 plays, 73 yards, 1:43) | SOU 16–7 |
| 2 | 02:28 | TXSO | Ke'Lenn Davis 54-yard pass from Jalen Brown (Richard Garcia III kick) (5 plays, 76 yards, 1:02) | SOU 16–14 |
| 2 | 02:13 | SOU | Shykee Thomas 98-yard kickoff returned (Cesar Barajas kick) (0 plays, 0 yards, 0:00) | SOU 23–14 |
| 3 | 10:44 | SOU | Jerodd Sims 14-yard rush (Cesar Barajas kick) (7 plays, 73 yards, 4:13) | SOU 30–14 |
| 3 | 03:51 | SOU | Ethan Howard 18-yard pass from Ladarius Skelton (Cesar Barajas kick) (6 plays, 71 yards, 3:12) | SOU 37–14 |
| 4 | 12:41 | TXSO | LaDarius Owens 5-yard rush (two-point conversion pass attempt failed) (7 plays, 76 yards, 2:12) | SOU 37–20 |
| 4 | 10:16 | SOU | Jerodd Sims 5-yard rush (Cesar Barajas kick) (5 plays, 54 yards, 2:17) | SOU 44–20 |
| 4 | 07:01 | SOU | Brandon Hinton 6-yard pass from John Lampley (Cesar Barajas kick) (4 plays, 28 yards, 2:11) | SOU 51–20 |
| 4 | 04:18 | TXSO | Richard Garcia III 34-yard field goal (9 plays, 42 yards, 2:39) | SOU 51–23 |

| Statistics | Southern | Texas Southern |
|---|---|---|
| First downs | 24 | 22 |
| Total yards | 460 | 383 |
| Rushing yards | 258 | 102 |
| Passing yards | 202 | 281 |
| Turnovers | 1 | 2 |
| Time of possession | 32:51 | 27:09 |

| Team | Category | Player | Statistics |
|---|---|---|---|
| Southern | Passing | Ladarius Skelton | 11/18, 174 yards, 2 TDs, 1 INT |
| Southern | Rushing | Ladarius Skelton | 14 carries, 71 yards |
| Southern | Receiving | Ethan Howard | 2 receptions, 56 yards, 2 TDs |
| Texas Southern | Passing | Jalen Brown | 21/37, 281 yards, 1 TD, 1 INT |
| Texas Southern | Rushing | Jacorey Howard | 14 carries, 59 yards, 1 TD |
| Texas Southern | Receiving | Ke'Lenn Davis | 3 receptions, 85 yards, 1 TD |

=== At Jackson State ===
Southern at Jackson State

| Team | 1 | 2 | 3 | 4 | Total |
|---|---|---|---|---|---|
| • Jaguars | 7 | 10 | 10 | 7 | 34 |
| Tigers | 0 | 7 | 0 | 7 | 14 |

- Date: April 3, 2021
- Location: Mississippi Veterans Memorial Stadium
  Jackson, MS
- Game start: 4:00 p.m. CDT
- Elapsed time: 3 hours and 7 minutes
- Game attendance: 22,000
- Game weather: 68 °F (20 °C) • Weather: Sunny • Wind: 3 MPH
- Television network: ESPN

Scoring summary
| 1 | 10:01 | SOU | Devon Benn 1-yard rush (Cesar Barajas kick) (11 plays, 70 yards, 4:59) | SOU 7–0 |
| 2 | 12:43 | SOU | Cesar Barajas 30-yard field goal (11 plays, 51 yards, 4:54) | SOU 10–0 |
| 2 | 06:48 | JSU | Daylen Baldwin 75-yard pass from Jalon Jones (Glenn Misiak kick)br/>(1 play, 75 yards, 0:11) | SOU 10–7 |
| 2 | 00:08 | SOU | Corey Williams 20-yard pass from John Lampley (Cesar Barajas kick) (5 plays, 54 yards, 0:37) | SOU 17–7 |
| 3 | 11:07 | SOU | Cesar Barajas 49-yard field goal (7 plays, 28 yards, 3:00) | SOU 20–7 |
| 3 | 04:21 | SOU | Devon Benn 20-yard rush (Cesar Barajas kick) (9 plays, 93 yards, 4:09) | SOU 27–7 |
| 4 | 14:55 | JSU | Corey Reed Jr. 18-yard pass from Jalon Jones (Glenn Misiak kick) (13 plays, 82 yards, 4:26) | SOU 27–14 |
| 4 | 11:35 | SOU | Ladarius Skelton 2-yard rush (Cesar Barajas kick) (1 play, 2 yards, 0:04) | SOU 34–14 |

| Statistics | Southern | Jackson State |
|---|---|---|
| First downs | 26 | 16 |
| Total yards | 474 | 309 |
| Rushing yards | 294 | 66 |
| Passing yards | 180 | 243 |
| Turnovers | 2 | 1 |
| Time of possession | 42:49 | 17:11 |

| Team | Category | Player | Statistics |
|---|---|---|---|
| Southern | Passing | John Lampley | 9/14, 116 yards, 1 TD |
| Southern | Rushing | Jerodd Sims | 17 carries, 79 yards |
| Southern | Receiving | Ethan Howard | 4 receptions, 54 yards |
| Jackson State | Passing | Jalon Jones | 17/29, 243 yards, 2 TDs, 1 INT |
| Jackson State | Rushing | Tyson Alexander | 8 carries, 38 yards |
| Jackson State | Receiving | Daylen Baldwin | 3 receptions, 91 yards, 1 TD |

=== Vs. Grambling State ===
Grambling State vs. Southern

| Team | 1 | 2 | 3 | 4 | Total |
|---|---|---|---|---|---|
| Tigers | 0 | 0 | 7 | 0 | 7 |
| • Jaguars | 14 | 14 | 14 | 7 | 49 |

- Date: April 17, 2021
- Location: Independence Stadium
  Shreveport, LA
- Game start: 1:30 p.m. CDT
- Elapsed time: 3 hours and 24 minutes
- Game attendance: 11,312
- Game weather: 61 °F (16 °C) • Weather: Cloudy • Wind: NNW 11 MPH
- Referee: Y. N. Meyers
- Television network: NBC Sports Network

Scoring summary
| 1 | 08:48 | SOU | Ladarius Skelton 3-yard rush (Cesar Barajas kick) (12 plays, 75 yards, 4:46) | SOU 7–0 |
| 1 | 03:01 | SOU | Craig Nelson 4-yard rush (Cesar Barajas kick) (10 plays, 57 yards, 4:55) | SOU 14–0 |
| 2 | 11:24 | SOU | Travis Tucker 22-yard pass from John Lampley (Cesar Barajas kick)br/>(8 plays, 82 yards, 3:29) | SOU 21–0 |
| 2 | 00:11 | SOU | Jerodd Sims 1-yard rush (Cesar Barajas kick) (5 plays, 78 yards, 3:11) | SOU 28–0 |
| 3 | 11:40 | SOU | Ladarius Skelton 3-yard rush (Cesar Barajas kick) (6 plays, 69 yards, 3:11) | SOU 35–0 |
| 3 | 09:01 | GRAM | Raylon Richardson 13-yard pass from Elijah Walker (Garrett Urban kick) (7 plays, 75 yards, 2:39) | SOU 35–7 |
| 3 | 03:22 | SOU | Marquis McClain 5-yard rush (Cesar Barajas kick) (9 plays, 68 yards, 5:33) | SOU 42–7 |
| 4 | 13:46 | SOU | Glendon McDaniels 5-yard rush (Cesar Barajas kick) (3 plays, 50 yards, 1:01) | SOU 49–7 |

| Statistics | Grambling State | Southern |
|---|---|---|
| First downs | 13 | 19 |
| Total yards | 208 | 520 |
| Rushing yards | 143 | 232 |
| Passing yards | 65 | 288 |
| Turnovers | 0 | 0 |
| Time of possession | 25:51 | 34:09 |

| Team | Category | Player | Statistics |
|---|---|---|---|
| Grambling State | Passing | Elijah Walker | 9/14, 65 yards, 1 TD |
| Grambling State | Rushing | Lyndemian Brooks | 9 carries, 71 yards |
| Grambling State | Receiving | Raylon Richardson | 3 receptions, 51 yards, 1 TD |
| Southern | Passing | John Lampley | 8/11, 143 yards, 1 TDs |
| Southern | Rushing | Ladarius Skelton | 7 carries, 76 yards, 2 TDs |
| Southern | Receiving | Ethan Howard | 5 receptions, 80 yards |
