= 2020 Alabama State Hornets football team =

American college football season

2020 Alabama State Hornets football
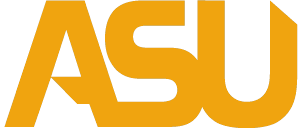
- Conference: Southwestern Athletic Conference
- East Division
- Record: 3–3 (3–2 SWAC)
- Head coach: Donald Hill-Eley (3rd season)
- Offensive coordinator: Joe Blackwell (2nd season)
- Defensive coordinator: Travis Pearson (2nd season)
- Home stadium: New ASU Stadium

2020 Southwestern Athletic Conference football standings
	Conf.			Overall
Team	W		L	W		L
East Division
No. 24 Alabama A&M x$	3	–	0	5	–	0
Alabama State	3	–	2	3	–	3
Jackson State	3	–	2	4	–	3
Mississippi Valley State	1	–	3	1	–	3
West Division
Arkansas–Pine Bluff x	4	–	0	4	–	1
Southern	4	–	1	5	–	1
Prairie View A&M*	2	–	1	2	–	1
Texas Southern	1	–	2	1	–	2
Grambling State	0	–	4	0	–	4
Championship: Alabama A&M 40, Arkansas–Pine Bluff 33
$ – Conference champion; x – Division champion/co-champions; Note: The SWAC played a spring conference-only schedule (February–May 2021) due to COVID-19 pandemic. Alcorn State opted out of the spring season; all of their scheduled games were counted as forfeit wins for their opponents. * – Ineligible for FCS postseason play due to NCAA sanctions.; Rankings from STATS Poll

The 2020 Alabama State Hornets football team represented Alabama State University as a member of the East Division of the Southwestern Athletic Conference (SWAC) during 2020–21 NCAA Division I FCS football season. Led by third-year head coach Donald Hill-Eley, the Hornets compiled an overall record of 3–3 with a mark of 3–2 in conference play, tying for second place in the SWAC's East Division. Alabama State played home games at New ASU Stadium in Montgomery, Alabama.

On July 20, 2020, the SWAC announced that it would not play fall sports due to the COVID-19 pandemic. The conference then formalized plans to conduct a schedule for football during the 2021 spring semester.

== Schedule ==
Due to the SWAC's postponement of the 2020 football season to spring 2021, games against Kennesaw State, Tuskegee, and Texas Tech were canceled. The SWAC released updated spring schedules on August 17.

Date	Time	Opponent	Site	TV	Result	Attendance
February 26	6:00 p.m.	Southern	New ASU Stadium; Montgomery, AL	ESPN3	L 21–24	5,654
March 6		at Alcorn State	Casem-Spinks Stadium; Lorman, MS		W 2–0 (forfeit)	
March 20	3:00 p.m.	Jackson State	New ASU Stadium; Montgomery, AL	ESPN2	W 35–28	5,908
April 3	1:00 p.m.	South Carolina State*	New ASU Stadium; Montgomery, AL		L 7–14	4,387
April 10	2:00 p.m.	Mississippi Valley State	New ASU Stadium; Montgomery, AL		W 42–17	12,345
April 17	6:30 p.m.	vs. Alabama A&M	Legion Field; Birmingham, AL (Magic City Classic)	ESPNU	L 14–38	16,500
*Non-conference game; All times are in Central time

== Game summaries ==
=== Southern ===
Southern at Alabama State

Team	1	2	3	4	Total
• Jaguars	7	0	7	10	24
Hornets	0	7	14	0	21

- Date: February 26, 2021
- Location: New ASU Stadium
  Montgomery, AL
- Game start: 6:04 p.m. CST
- Elapsed time: 3 hours and 26 minutes
- Game attendance: 5,654
- Game weather: 74 °F (23 °C) • Weather: Mostly Cloudy • Wind: N 8 MPH
- Referee: Gary Leeper
- Television network: ESPN3

Scoring summary
1	11:17	SOU	Chase Foster 14-yard interception returned (Cesar Barajas kick) (3 plays, 0 yards, 1:26)	SOU 7–0
2	01:08	ALST	Jeremiah Hixon 32-yard pass from Ryan Nettles (Hunter Hanson kick) (8 plays, 60 yards, 3:48)	TIE 7–7
3	11:45	SOU	Ladarius Skelton 8-yard rush (Cesar Barajas kick)br/>(7 play, 45 yards, 3:15)	SOU 14–7
3	08:21	ALST	Michael Jefferson 14-yard pass from Ryan Nettles (Hunter Hanson kick) (8 plays, 70 yards, 3:24)	TIE 14–14
3	00:15	ALST	Jacory Merritt 1-yard rush (Hunter Hanson kick) (3 plays, 5 yards, 1:22)	ALST 21–14
4	14:20	SOU	Gregory Perkins 59-yard pass from Ladarius Skelton (Cesar Barajas kick) (3 plays, 74 yards, 0:55)	TIE 21–21
4	12:20	SOU	Cesar Barajas 41-yard field goal (4 plays, 1 yard, 0:52)	SOU 24–21

Statistics	Southern	Alabama State
First downs	12	22
Total yards	274	274
Rushing yards	139	125
Passing yards	135	149
Turnovers	3	3
Time of possession	23:44	36:16

Team	Category	Player	Statistics
Southern	Passing	Ladarius Skelton	10/22, 135 yards, 1 TD
Southern	Rushing	Ladarius Skelton	10 carries, 72 yards, 1 TD
Southern	Receiving	Gregory Perkins	1 reception, 59 yards, 1 TD
Alabama State	Passing	Ryan Nettles	16/27, 149 yards, 2 TDs, 1 INT
Alabama State	Rushing	Ezra Gray	14 carries, 73 yards
Alabama State	Receiving	Michael Jefferson	5 receptions, 47 yards, 1 TD

=== Jackson State ===
Jackson State at Alabama State

Team	1	2	3	4	Total
Tigers	0	6	15	7	28
• Hornets	0	14	0	21	35

- Date: March 20, 2021
- Location: New ASU Stadium
  Montgomery, AL
- Game start: 3:07 p.m. CDT
- Elapsed time: 3 hours and 51 minutes
- Game attendance: 5,908
- Game weather: 61 °F (16 °C) • Weather: Partly Cloudy • Wind: NE 7 MPH
- Referee: Tony Ross
- Television network: ESPN2

Scoring summary
2	10:01	JSU	Glenn Misiak 31-yard field goal (7 plays, 14 yards, 1:46)	JSU 3–0
2	06:57	ALST	Jeremiah Hixon 35-yard pass from Ryan Nettles (Hunter Hanson kick) (6 plays, 78 yards, 2:59)	ALST 7–3
2	04:37	JSU	Glenn Misiak 22-yard field goal (6 plays, 20 yards, 1:54)	ALST 7–6
2	08:21	ALST	Jahod Booker 8-yard pass from Ryan Nettles (Hunter Hanson kick) (12 plays, 89 yards, 4:00)	ALST 14–6
3	08:26	JSU	Team Safety (2 plays, -1 yards, 1:04)	ALST 14–8
3	04:48	JSU	Corey Reed Jr. 17-yard pass from Jalon Jones (Glenn Misiak kick) (8 plays, 50 yards, 3:38)	JSU 15–14
3	04:04	JSU	Jalon Jones 3-yard rush (two-point conversion pass attempt failed) (3 plays, 4 yards, 0:23)	JSU 21–14
4	10:50	ALST	Ezra Gray 4-yard rush (Hunter Hanson kick) (10 plays, 95 yards, 3:58)	TIE 21–21
4	06:53	ALST	Ezra Gray 49-yard rush (Hunter Hanson kick) (6 plays, 86 yards, 2:43)	ALST 28–21
4	01:42	JSU	Jalon Jones 2-yard rush (Glenn Misiak kick) (14 plays, 67 yards, 5:04)	TIE 28–28
4	01:29	ALST	Ezra Gray 50-yard rush (Hunter Hanson kick) (1 play, 50 yards, 0:09)	ALST 35–28

Statistics	Jackson State	Alabama State
First downs	24	21
Total yards	350	466
Rushing yards	170	209
Passing yards	180	257
Turnovers	2	3
Time of possession	29:56	30:04

Team	Category	Player	Statistics
Jackson State	Passing	Jalon Jones	19/50, 180 yards, 1 TD, 2 INTs
Jackson State	Rushing	Jalon Jones	22 carries, 94 yards, 2 TDs
Jackson State	Receiving	Corey Reed Jr.	8 receptions, 99 yards, 1 TD
Alabama State	Passing	Ryan Nettles	27/42, 257 yards, 2 TDs, 2 INTs
Alabama State	Rushing	Ezra Gray	23 carries, 195 yards, 3 TDs
Alabama State	Receiving	Michael Jefferson	8 receptions, 76 yards

=== South Carolina State ===
South Carolina State at Alabama State

Team	1	2	3	4	Total
• Bulldogs	7	0	0	7	14
Hornets	0	0	0	7	7

- Date: April 3, 2021
- Location: New ASU Stadium
  Montgomery, AL
- Game start: 2:02 p.m. CDT
- Elapsed time: 3 hours and 7 minutes
- Game attendance: 4,387
- Game weather: 65 °F (18 °C) • Weather: Sunny • Wind: SE 4 MPH
- Referee: Y. N. Myers

Scoring summary
1	11:44	SCSU	Alex James 12-yard rush (Dillom Bredson kick) (7 plays, 65 yards, 3:16)	SCSU 7–0
4	03:05	ALST	Wallace Corker 9-yard pass from Ryan Nettles (Hunter Hanson kick) (4 plays, 11 yards, 1:20)	TIE 7–7
4	01:17	SCSU	Shaquan Davis 17-yard pass from Corey Fields (Jacory Benson kick) (7 plays, 59 yards, 1:45)	SCSU 14–7

Statistics	South Carolina State	Alabama State
First downs	14	17
Total yards	222	288
Rushing yards	131	97
Passing yards	91	191
Turnovers	2	3
Time of possession	33:43	26:17

Team	Category	Player	Statistics
South Carolina State	Passing	Corey Fields	4/9, 47 yards, 1 TD, 2 INTs
South Carolina State	Rushing	Alex James	12 carries, 55 yards, 1 TD
South Carolina State	Receiving	Shaquan Davis	3 receptions, 45 yards, 1 TD
Alabama State	Passing	Ryan Nettles	20/37, 191 yards, 1 TD, 1 INT
Alabama State	Rushing	Ryan Nettles	6 carries, 37 yards
Alabama State	Receiving	Michael Jefferson	5 receptions, 61 yards

=== Mississippi Valley State ===
Mississippi Valley State at Alabama State

Team	1	2	3	4	Total
Delta Devils	10	0	7	0	17
• Hornets	7	7	7	21	42

- Date: April 10, 2021
- Location: New ASU Stadium
  Montgomery, AL
- Game start: 2:00 p.m. CDT
- Elapsed time: 3 hours and 31 minutes
- Game attendance: 12,345
- Game weather: 69 °F (21 °C) • Weather: Showers • Wind: SSW 10 MPH
- Referee: Y. N. Myers

Scoring summary
1	10:53	MVSU	Orlando Fernandez 26-yard field goal (10 plays, 66 yards, 4:07)	MVSU 3–0
1	05:46	ALST	Myles Crawley 3-yard rush (Hunter Hanson kick) (3 plays, 14 yards, 1:07)	ALST 7–3
1	00:10	MVSU	Jalani Eason 24-yard rush (Orlando Fernandez kick) (6 plays, 54 yards, 2:55)	MVSU 10–7
2	14:32	ALST	Wallace Corker 59-yard pass from Ryan Nettles (Hunter Hanson kick) (3 plays, 77 yards, 0:32)	ALST 14–10
3	04:59	ALST	Jeremiah Hixon 15-yard pass from Ryan Nettles (Hunter Hanson kick) (4 plays, 80 yards, 1:57)	ALST 21–10
3	01:45	MVSU	Malik Myers 7-yard pass from Jalani Eason (Orlando Fernandez kick) (9 plays, 75 yards, 3:14)	ALST 21–17
4	12:59	ALST	Ryan Nettles 14-yard rush (Hunter Hanson kick) (2 plays, 22 yards, 0:27)	ALST 28–17
4	09:13	ALST	Jahod Booker 14-yard pass from Ryan Nettles (Hunter Hanson kick) (5 plays, 71 yards, 1:43)	ALST 35–17
4	01:00	ALST	Robert Rivers 1-yard rush (Hunter Hanson kick) (5 plays, 22 yards, 2:40)	ALST 42–17

Statistics	Mississippi Valley State	Alabama State
First downs	17	22
Total yards	315	466
Rushing yards	169	156
Passing yards	146	310
Turnovers	4	2
Time of possession	32:03	27:57

Team	Category	Player	Statistics
Mississippi Valley State	Passing	Jalani Eason	16/28, 135 yards, 1 TD, 1 INT
Mississippi Valley State	Rushing	Jalani Eason	20 carries, 121 yards, 1 TD
Mississippi Valley State	Receiving	Darius Williams	2 receptions, 49 yards
Alabama State	Passing	Ryan Nettles	20/34, 305 yards, 3 TDs, 1 INT
Alabama State	Rushing	Ryan Nettles	7 carries, 66 yards, 1 TD
Alabama State	Receiving	Jeremiah Hixon	5 receptions, 93 yards, 1 TD

=== Vs. Alabama State ===
Alabama State vs. Alabama A&M

Team	1	2	3	4	Total
Hornets	7	7	0	0	14
• Bulldogs	7	10	14	7	38

- Date: April 17, 2021
- Location: Legion Field
  Birmingham, AL
- Game start: 6:30 p.m. CDT
- Elapsed time: 3 hours and 45 minutes
- Game attendance: 16,500
- Game weather: 71 °F (22 °C) • Weather: Light Clouds
- Television network: ESPNU

Scoring summary
1	08:30	ALST	Jacory Merritt 1-yard rush (Hunter Hanson kick) (11 plays, 95 yards, 0:00)	ALST 7–0
1	03:14	AAMU	Gary Quarles 7-yard rush (Spencer Corey kick) (9 plays, 78 yards, 0:00)	TIE 7–7
2	07:30	ALST	Michael Jefferson 9-yard pass from Chris Scott (Hunter Hanson kick)br/>(11 plays, 58 yards, 5:40)	ALST 14–7
2	06:42	AAMU	Gary Quarles 15-yard rush (Spencer Corey kick) (5 plays, 85 yards, 0:42)	TIE 14–14
2	00:00	AAMU	Spencer Corey 46-yard field goal (1 play, 0 yards, 0:04)	AAMU 17–14
3	12:13	AAMU	Zabrian Moore 44-yard pass from Aqeel Glass (Spencer Corey kick) (9 plays, 78 yards, 2:47)	AAMU 24–14
3	03:17	AAMU	Zabrian Moore 38-yard pass from Aqeel Glass (Spencer Corey kick) (10 plays, 99 yards, 4:28)	AAMU 31–14
4	12:31	AAMU	Odieu Hilaire 2-yard pass from Aqeel Glass (Spencer Corey kick) (9 plays, 52 yards, 3:32)	AAMU 38–14

Statistics	Alabama State	Alabama A&M
First downs	20	24
Total yards	285	484
Rushing yards	181	112
Passing yards	104	372
Turnovers	0	0
Time of possession	31:12	28:48

Team	Category	Player	Statistics
Alabama State	Passing	Chris Scott	13/28, 89 yards, 1 TD
Alabama State	Rushing	Ezra Gray	19 carries, 101 yards
Alabama State	Receiving	Jahod Booker	5 receptions, 58 yards
Alabama A&M	Passing	Aqeel Glass	25/40, 372 yards, 3 TDs
Alabama A&M	Rushing	Aqeel Glass	5 carries, 45 yards
Alabama A&M	Receiving	Zabrian Moore	4 receptions, 138 yards, 2 TDs
