= Hornet Stadium =

Hornet Stadium may refer to either of two U.S. college football stadiums, both of which are on the campuses of universities whose athletic nickname is "Hornets":

- Hornet Stadium (Montgomery), on the campus of Alabama State University
- Hornet Stadium (Sacramento), on the campus of California State University, Sacramento (more commonly called "Sacramento State")
