= 2021 SWAC Championship Game =

2021 SWAC Championship Game can refer to:

- 2021 SWAC Championship Game (May), part of the 2020–21 FCS season, between the Arkansas–Pine Bluff Golden Lions and Alabama A&M Bulldogs
- 2021 SWAC Championship Game (December), part of the 2021 FCS season, between the Prairie View A&M Panthers and Jackson State Tigers
