= ASU Stadium =

ASU Stadium may refer to:

- ASU Stadium (Alabama), a football stadium in Montgomery, Alabama on the campus of Alabama State University
- ASU Stadium, now known as Centennial Bank Stadium, a football stadium in Jonesboro, Arkansas on the campus of Arkansas State University
