= 2020 Mississippi Valley State Delta Devils football team =

American college football season

2020 Mississippi Valley State Delta Devils football
- Conference: Southwestern Athletic Conference
- East Division
- Record: 1–3 (1–3 SWAC)
- Head coach: Vincent Dancy (3rd season)
- Offensive coordinator: Jared Powers (2nd season)
- Defensive coordinator: Derek Welch (3rd season)
- Home stadium: Rice–Totten Stadium

2020 Southwestern Athletic Conference football standings
	Conf.			Overall
Team	W		L	W		L
East Division
No. 24 Alabama A&M x$	3	–	0	5	–	0
Alabama State	3	–	2	3	–	3
Jackson State	3	–	2	4	–	3
Mississippi Valley State	1	–	3	1	–	3
West Division
Arkansas–Pine Bluff x	4	–	0	4	–	1
Southern	4	–	1	5	–	1
Prairie View A&M*	2	–	1	2	–	1
Texas Southern	1	–	2	1	–	2
Grambling State	0	–	4	0	–	4
Championship: Alabama A&M 40, Arkansas–Pine Bluff 33
$ – Conference champion; x – Division champion/co-champions; Note: The SWAC played a spring conference-only schedule (February–May 2021) due to COVID-19 pandemic. Alcorn State opted out of the spring season; all of their scheduled games were counted as forfeit wins for their opponents. * – Ineligible for FCS postseason play due to NCAA sanctions.; Rankings from STATS Poll

The 2020 Mississippi Valley State Delta Devils football team represented Mississippi Valley State University as a member of the East Division of the Southwestern Athletic Conference (SWAC) during the 2020–21 NCAA Division I FCS football season. Led by third-year head coach Vincent Dancy, the Delta Devils compiled an overall record of 1–3 with an identical mark conference play, placing last out of fourt teams in the SWAC's East Division. Mississippi Valley State played home games at Rice–Totten Stadium in Itta Bena, Mississippi.

On July 20, 2020, the Southwestern Athletic Conference announced that it would not play fall sports due to the COVID-19 pandemic, which includes the football program. The conference is formalizing plans to conduct a competitive schedule for football during the 2021 spring semester.

== Schedule ==
Due to the SWAC's postponement of the 2020 football season to spring 2021, games against Nicholls, Sam Houston State, and Virginia–Lynchburg were canceled. The SWAC released updated spring schedules on August 17.

Date	Time	Opponent	Site	TV	Result
March 14	2:00 p.m.	at Jackson State	Mississippi Veterans Memorial Stadium; Jackson, MS	ESPN2	L 7–43
March 20		Alcorn State	Rice–Totten Stadium; Itta Bena, MS		W 2–0 (forfeit)
April 3	3:00 p.m.	Arkansas–Pine Bluff	Rice–Totten Stadium; Itta Bena, MS	ESPN3	L 17–24
April 10	2:00 p.m.	at Alabama State	New ASU Stadium; Montgomery, AL		L 17–42
All times are in Central time

== Game summaries ==
=== At Jackson State ===
Mississippi Valley State at Jackson State

Team	1	2	3	4	Total
Delta Devils	0	0	0	7	7
• Tigers	7	23	0	13	43

- Date: March 14, 2021
- Location: Mississippi Veterans Memorial Stadium
  Jackson, MS
- Game start: 2:00 p.m. CST
- Elapsed time: 3 hours and 34 minutes
- Game attendance: 22,000
- Game weather: 79 °F (26 °C) • Weather: Cloudy • Wind: N 11 MPH
- Television network: ESPN2

Scoring summary
1	08:17	JSU	Jalon Jones 19-yard rush (Glenn Misiak kick) (13 plays, 95 yards, 5:14)	JSU 7–0
2	14:00	JSU	Daylen Baldwin 30-yard pass from Jalon Jones (Glenn Misiak PAT failed) (9 plays, 79 yards, 3:30)	JSU 13–0
2	09:55	JSU	Daylen Baldwin 38-yard pass from Jalon Jones (Jalon Jones two-point conversion pass to Kyland Richey)br/>(3 play, 62 yards, 0:53)	JSU 21–0
2	07:47	JSU	Daylen Baldwin 20-yard pass form Jalon Jones (two-point conversion rush failed) (2 plays, 20 yards, 0:17)	JSU 27–0
2	04:40	JSU	Noah Anderson 29-yard field goal (5 plays, 29 yards, 2:22)	JSU 30–0
4	04:20	MVSU	Jalani Eason 11-yard rush (Orlando Fernandez kick) (3 plays, 24 yards, 1:30)	JSU 30–7
4	01:34	JSU	Quincy Casey 2-yard rush (Glenn Misiak kick) (8 plays, 58 yards, 2:44)	JSU 37–7
4	00:25	JSU	Jaumonie Crain 26-yard fumble returned (Glenn Misiak PAT failed) (1 play, -9 yards, 0:10)	JSU 43–7

Over/under
JSU −17.5	55

Statistics	Mississippi Valley State	Jackson State
First downs	15	21
Total yards	271	456
Rushing yards	147	153
Passing yards	124	303
Turnovers	4	2
Time of possession	34:08	25:52

Team	Category	Player	Statistics
Mississippi Valley State	Passing	Jalani Eason	17/34, 117 yards, 1 INT
Mississippi Valley State	Rushing	Darius Williams	9 carries, 65 yards
Mississippi Valley State	Receiving	Jarius Clayton	5 receptions, 35 yards
Jackson State	Passing	Jalon Jones	14/27, 250 yards, 3 TDs
Jackson State	Rushing	Tyson Alexander	6 carries, 136 yards, 3 TDs
Jackson State	Receiving	Daylen Baldwin	6 receptions, 136 yards, 3 TDs

=== Arkansas–Pine Bluff ===
Arkansas–Pine Bluff at Mississippi Valley State

Team	1	2	3	4	Total
• Golden Lions	0	17	0	7	24
Delta Devils	3	0	7	7	17

- Date: April 3, 2021
- Location: Rice–Totten Stadium
  Itta Bena, MS
- Game start: 3:00 p.m. CDT
- Elapsed time: 3 hours and 11 minutes
- Game attendance: 0
- Game weather: 66 °F (19 °C) • Weather: Clear • Wind: S 5 MPH

Scoring summary
1	10:00	MVSU	Orlando Fernandez 46-yard field goal (6 plays, 39 yards, 3:08)	MVSU 3–0
2	14:56	UAPB	DeJuan Miller 8-yard pass from Skyler Perry (Zach Piwniczka kick) (4 plays, 41 yards, 1:20)	UAPB 7–3
2	12:54	UAPB	Josh Wilkes 4-yard pass from Skyler Perry (Zach Piwniczka kick)br/>(7 play, 48 yards, 2:02)	UAPB 14–3
2	00:02	UAPB	Zach Piwniczka 17-yard field goal (12 plays, 58 yards, 4:18)	UAPB 17–3
3	11:57	MVSU	Caleb Johnson 4-yard rush (Orlando Fernandez kick) (7 plays, 76 yards, 2:54)	UAPB 17–10
4	07:55	MVSU	Caleb Johnson 50-yard rush (Orlando Fernandez kick) (1 play, 50 yards, 0:08)	TIE 17–17
4	01:54	UAPB	Tyrin Ralph 77-yard punt returned (Zach Piwniczka kick) (0 plays, 0 yards, 0:00)	UAPB 24–17

Over/under
UAPB −18.0	58

Statistics	Arkansas–Pine Bluff	Mississippi Valley State
First downs	16	13
Total yards	334	248
Rushing yards	82	144
Passing yards	252	104
Turnovers	0	1
Time of possession	29:49	30:11

Team	Category	Player	Statistics
Arkansas–Pine Bluff	Passing	Skyler Perry	23/42, 235 yards, 2 TDs, 1 INT
Arkansas–Pine Bluff	Rushing	Mattias Clark	18 carries, 75 yards
Arkansas–Pine Bluff	Receiving	Harry Ballard III	5 receptions, 70 yards
Mississippi Valley State	Passing	Jalani Eason	14/24, 104 yards
Mississippi Valley State	Rushing	Caleb Johnson	13 carries, 70 yards, 2 TDs
Mississippi Valley State	Receiving	Malik Myers	4 receptions, 56 yards

=== At Alabama State ===
Mississippi Valley State at Alabama State

Team	1	2	3	4	Total
Delta Devils	10	0	7	0	17
• Hornets	7	7	7	21	42

- Date: April 10, 2021
- Location: New ASU Stadium
  Montgomery, AL
- Game start: 2:00 p.m. CDT
- Elapsed time: 3 hours and 31 minutes
- Game attendance: 12,345
- Game weather: 69 °F (21 °C) • Weather: Showers • Wind: SSW 10 MPH
- Referee: Y. N. Myers

Scoring summary
1	10:53	MVSU	Orlando Fernandez 26-yard field goal (10 plays, 66 yards, 4:07)	MVSU 3–0
1	05:46	ALST	Myles Crawley 3-yard rush (Hunter Hanson kick) (3 plays, 14 yards, 1:07)	ALST 7–3
1	00:10	MVSU	Jalani Eason 24-yard rush (Orlando Fernandez kick) (6 plays, 54 yards, 2:55)	MVSU 10–7
2	14:32	ALST	Wallace Corker 59-yard pass from Ryan Nettles (Hunter Hanson kick) (3 plays, 77 yards, 0:32)	ALST 14–10
3	04:59	ALST	Jeremiah Hixon 15-yard pass from Ryan Nettles (Hunter Hanson kick) (4 plays, 80 yards, 1:57)	ALST 21–10
3	01:45	MVSU	Malik Myers 7-yard pass from Jalani Eason (Orlando Fernandez kick) (9 plays, 75 yards, 3:14)	ALST 21–17
4	12:59	ALST	Ryan Nettles 14-yard rush (Hunter Hanson kick) (2 plays, 22 yards, 0:27)	ALST 28–17
4	09:13	ALST	Jahod Booker 14-yard pass from Ryan Nettles (Hunter Hanson kick) (5 plays, 71 yards, 1:43)	ALST 35–17
4	01:00	ALST	Robert Rivers 1-yard rush (Hunter Hanson kick) (5 plays, 22 yards, 2:40)	ALST 42–17

Over/under
ALST –14.5	40

Statistics	Mississippi Valley State	Alabama State
First downs	17	22
Total yards	315	466
Rushing yards	169	156
Passing yards	146	310
Turnovers	4	2
Time of possession	32:03	27:57

Team	Category	Player	Statistics
Mississippi Valley State	Passing	Jalani Eason	16/28, 135 yards, 1 TD, 1 INT
Mississippi Valley State	Rushing	Jalani Eason	20 carries, 121 yards, 1 TD
Mississippi Valley State	Receiving	Darius Williams	2 receptions, 49 yards
Alabama State	Passing	Ryan Nettles	20/34, 305 yards, 3 TDs, 1 INT
Alabama State	Rushing	Ryan Nettles	7 carries, 66 yards, 1 TD
Alabama State	Receiving	Jeremiah Hixon	5 receptions, 93 yards, 1 TD
