= 2020 Texas Southern Tigers football team =

American college football season

2020 Texas Southern Tigers football
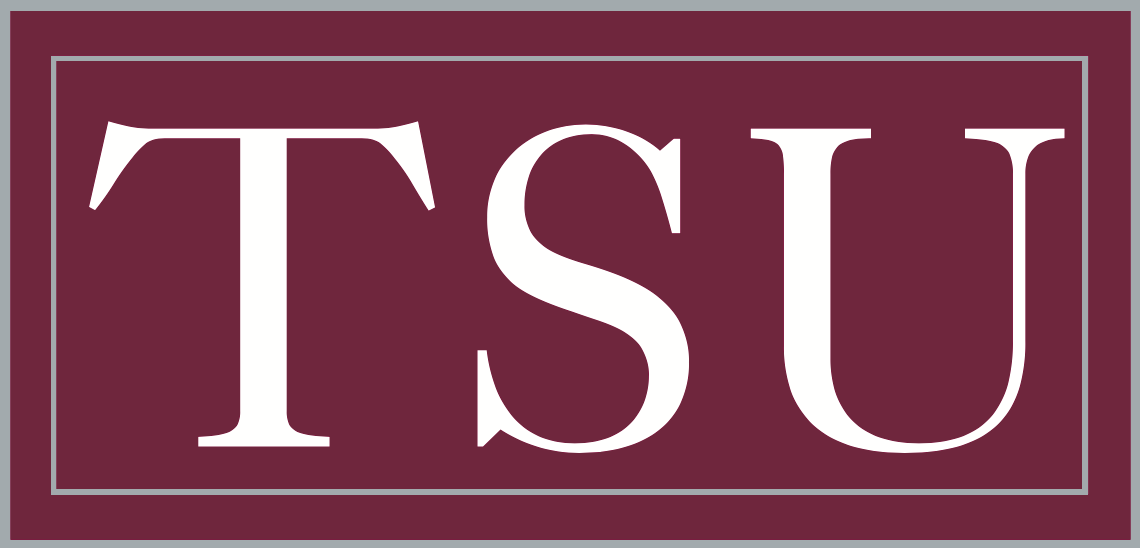
- Conference: Southwestern Athletic Conference
- West Division
- Record: 1–2 (1–2 SWAC)
- Head coach: Clarence McKinney (2nd season)
- Offensive coordinator: David Marsh (2nd season)
- Defensive coordinator: Jeffery Caesar (2nd season)
- Home stadium: BBVA Stadium

2020 Southwestern Athletic Conference football standings
	Conf.			Overall
Team	W		L	W		L
East Division
No. 24 Alabama A&M x$	3	–	0	5	–	0
Alabama State	3	–	2	3	–	3
Jackson State	3	–	2	4	–	3
Mississippi Valley State	1	–	3	1	–	3
West Division
Arkansas–Pine Bluff x	4	–	0	4	–	1
Southern	4	–	1	5	–	1
Prairie View A&M*	2	–	1	2	–	1
Texas Southern	1	–	2	1	–	2
Grambling State	0	–	4	0	–	4
Championship: Alabama A&M 40, Arkansas–Pine Bluff 33
$ – Conference champion; x – Division champion/co-champions; Note: The SWAC played a spring conference-only schedule (February–May 2021) due to COVID-19 pandemic. Alcorn State opted out of the spring season; all of their scheduled games were counted as forfeit wins for their opponents. * – Ineligible for FCS postseason play due to NCAA sanctions.; Rankings from STATS Poll

The 2020 Texas Southern Tigers football team represented Texas Southern University a member of the West Division of the Southwestern Athletic Conference (SWAC) during 2020–21 NCAA Division I FCS football season. Led second-year head coach Clarence McKinney, the Tigers compiled an overall record of 1–2 with an identical mark in conference play, placing fourth teams in the SWAC's West Division. Texas Southern played home games at BBVA Stadium in Houston.

On July 20, 2020, the SWAC announced that it would not play fall sports due to the COVID-19 pandemic.

== Preseason ==
=== Recruiting class ===
College recruiting information (2019)
Name	Hometown	School	Height	Weight	40^{‡}	Commit date
C'ing Blanton; Wide Receiver	Fort Worth, TX	Southwest HS	6 ft 2 in (1.88 m)	185 lb (84 kg)	-	Dec 18, 2019
C'ing Blanton; Wide Receiver	Recruit ratings: Scout: Rivals: 247Sports: ESPN:					
Jalen Brown; Quarterback	Austin, TX	Cedar Ridge HS	6 ft 2 in (1.88 m)	220 lb (100 kg)	-	Dec 18, 2019
Jalen Brown; Quarterback	Recruit ratings: Scout: Rivals: 247Sports: ESPN:					
Michael Buchanan Jr. Linebacker	Houston, TX	Wheatley HS	6 ft 1 in (1.85 m)	210 lb (95 kg)	-	Feb 5, 2020
Michael Buchanan Jr. Linebacker	Recruit ratings: Scout: Rivals: 247Sports: ESPN:					
Lance Clark; Defensive Back	Houston, TX	Furr HS	6 ft 0 in (1.83 m)	170 lb (77 kg)	-	Feb 5, 2020
Lance Clark; Defensive Back	Recruit ratings: Scout: Rivals: 247Sports: ESPN:					
Tzion Dixon; Linebacker	Chino, CA	Don Lugo HS; East Los Angeles College	6 ft 3 in (1.91 m)	230 lb (100 kg)	-	Dec 18, 2019
Tzion Dixon; Linebacker	Recruit ratings: Scout: Rivals: 247Sports: ESPN:					
Isaac Garcia; Long Snapper	Fort Worth, TX	Paschal HS	6 ft 1 in (1.85 m)	200 lb (91 kg)	-	Feb 5, 2020
Isaac Garcia; Long Snapper	Recruit ratings: Scout: Rivals: 247Sports: ESPN:					
Xavier "Trey" Goynes; Cornerback	Crowley, TX	Crowley HS	6 ft 0 in (1.83 m)	180 lb (82 kg)	-	Dec 18, 2019
Xavier "Trey" Goynes; Cornerback	Recruit ratings: Scout: Rivals: 247Sports: ESPN:					
Isaiah Hamilton; Cornerback	Channelview, TX	Channelview HS	6 ft 0 in (1.83 m)	171 lb (78 kg)	-	Dec 18, 2019
Isaiah Hamilton; Cornerback	Recruit ratings: Scout: Rivals: 247Sports: ESPN:					
Terence Jackson; Offensive Line	Beaumont, TX	United HS	6 ft 5 in (1.96 m)	260 lb (120 kg)	-	Dec 18, 2019
Terence Jackson; Offensive Line	Recruit ratings: Scout: Rivals: 247Sports: ESPN:					
Jyrin Johnson; Tight End	Gonzales, LA	East Ascension HS	6 ft 4 in (1.93 m)	200 lb (91 kg)	-	Dec 18, 2019
Jyrin Johnson; Tight End	Recruit ratings: Scout: Rivals: 247Sports: ESPN:					
Terry Petry; Cornerback	Missouri City, TX	Ridge Point HS; Missouri; Blinn College	5 ft 10 in (1.78 m)	175 lb (79 kg)	-	Dec 18, 2019
Terry Petry; Cornerback	Recruit ratings: Scout: Rivals: 247Sports: ESPN:					
Gabe Smith; Defensive End	Austin, TX	Lyndon B. Johnson HS	6 ft 3 in (1.91 m)	225 lb (102 kg)	-	Dec 18, 2019
Gabe Smith; Defensive End	Recruit ratings: Scout: Rivals: 247Sports: ESPN:					
Mehdi Torrence; Offensive Line	Houston, TX	Clear Brooks HS	6 ft 5 in (1.96 m)	330 lb (150 kg)	-	Dec 18, 2019
Mehdi Torrence; Offensive Line	Recruit ratings: Scout: Rivals: 247Sports: ESPN:					
Javius Williams; Linebacker	Dallas, TX	Skyline HS	6 ft 0 in (1.83 m)	195 lb (88 kg)	-	Dec 18, 2019
Javius Williams; Linebacker	Recruit ratings: Scout: Rivals: 247Sports: ESPN:					

== Schedule ==
Texas Southern's original 2020 schedule consisted of five home games, five away games, and one neutral site game. The Tigers were to travel to SWAC foes Prairie View A&M, Jackson State, Arkansas–Pine Bluff, and Alabama State. The Tigers were to host to SWAC opponents Houston Baptist, Alabama A&M, Grambling State, and Mississippi Valley State. Texas Southern were to travel to Arlington, Texas to compete against conference foe Southern in a neutral matchup at AT&T Stadium.

Due to the SWAC's postponement of the 2020 football season to spring 2021, games against Houston Baptist, New Mexico State, and Texas–Permian Basin were canceled. The SWAC released updated spring schedules on August 17.

Date	Time	Opponent	Site	TV	Result	Attendance
March 6	7:00 p.m.	at Prairie View A&M	Panther Stadium at Blackshear Field; Prairie View, TX (Labor Day Classic)	ESPN3	L 19–20	0
March 20	7:30 p.m.	Southern	BBVA Stadium; Houston, TX	AT&TSN	L 23–51	0
April 10		at Alcorn State	Jack Spinks Stadium; Lorman, MS		W 2–0 (forfeit)	
All times are in Central time

== Game summaries ==
=== At Prairie View A&M ===
Texas Southern at Prairie View A&M

Team	1	2	3	4	Total
Tigers	0	7	9	3	19
• Panthers	10	3	0	7	20

- Date: March 6, 2021
- Location: Panther Stadium at Blackshear Field
  Prairie View, TX
- Game start: 7:06 p.m. CDT
- Elapsed time: 3 hours and 39 minutes
- Game attendance: 3,750
- Game weather: 57 °F (14 °C) • Weather: Clear
- Referee: Marty Adams
- Television network: ESPN3

Scoring summary
1	07:25	PVAMU	Luis Reyes 31-yard field goal (9 plays, 42 yards, 3:48)	PVAMU 3–0
1	02:45	PVAMU	Ahmad Antoine 3-yard rush (Luis Reyes kick) (5 plays, 55 yards, 3:14)	PVAMU 10–0
2	01:03	PVAMU	Luis Reyes 23-yard field goal (6 plays, 66 yards, 1:55)	PVAMU 13–0
2	00:01	TXSO	Jonathan Giles 2-yard pass from Thaddeus Peyton (Richard Garcia III kick) (5 plays, 52 yards, 0:55)	PVAMU 13–7
3	09:10	TXSO	Team Safety (0 plays, 0 yards, 0:00)	PVAMU 13–9
3	06:28	TXSO	Osby Mitchell 4-yard pass from Thaddeus Peyton (Richard Garcia III kick) (7 plays, 72 yards, 2:37)	PVAMU 16–13
4	11:34	TXSO	Richard Garcia III 38-yard field goal (10 plays, 34 yards, 4:14)	TXSO 19–13
4	01:40	PVAMU	Kristian Mosley 4-yard rush (Luis Reyes kick) (11 plays, 79 yards, 3:11)	PVAMU 20–19

Over/under
PVAMU −20.5	57

Statistics	Texas Southern	Prairie View A&M
First downs	17	18
Total yards	327	320
Rushing yards	148	82
Passing yards	179	238
Turnovers	2	1
Time of possession	31:23	28:37

Team	Category	Player	Statistics
Texas Southern	Passing	Thaddeus Peyton	16/21, 137 yards, 2 TDs
Texas Southern	Rushing	LaDarius Owens	20 carries, 119 yards
Texas Southern	Receiving	Ke'Lenn Davis	4 receptions, 43 yards
Prairie View A&M	Passing	TJ Starks	10/21, 157 yards, 1 INT
Prairie View A&M	Rushing	TJ Starks	6 carries, 27 yards
Prairie View A&M	Receiving	Kalen Riles	3 receptions, 56 yards

=== Southern ===
Southern at Texas Southern

Team	1	2	3	4	Total
• Jaguars	9	14	14	14	51
Tigers	7	7	0	9	23

- Date: March 20, 2021
- Location: BBVA Stadium
  Houston, TX
- Game start: 7:30 p.m. CDT
- Elapsed time: 3 hours and 15 minutes
- Game attendance: 0
- Game weather: 66 °F (19 °C) • Weather: Clear • Wind: ENE 11 MPH
- Referee: Scott Johnson
- Television network: AT&T SportsNet

Scoring summary
1	09:14	SOU	Ethan Howard 38-yard pass from Ladarius Skelton (Cesar Barajas kick) (8 plays, 70 yards, 3:21)	SOU 7–0
1	08:00	SOU	Team Safety (3 plays, -19 yards, 1:08)	SOU 9–0
1	00:26	TXSO	Jacorey Howard 3-yard rush (Richard Garcia III kick)br/>(14 play, 87 yards, 4:57)	SOU 9–7
2	13:32	SOU	Jerodd Sims 22-yard pass from John Lampley (Cesar Barajas kick) (5 plays, 73 yards, 1:43)	SOU 16–7
2	02:28	TXSO	Ke'Lenn Davis 54-yard pass from Jalen Brown (Richard Garcia III kick) (5 plays, 76 yards, 1:02)	SOU 16–14
2	02:13	SOU	Shykee Thomas 98-yard kickoff returned (Cesar Barajas kick) (0 plays, 0 yards, 0:00)	SOU 23–14
3	10:44	SOU	Jerodd Sims 14-yard rush (Cesar Barajas kick) (7 plays, 73 yards, 4:13)	SOU 30–14
3	03:51	SOU	Ethan Howard 18-yard pass from Ladarius Skelton (Cesar Barajas kick) (6 plays, 71 yards, 3:12)	SOU 37–14
4	12:41	TXSO	LaDarius Owens 5-yard rush (two-point conversion pass attempt failed) (7 plays, 76 yards, 2:12)	SOU 37–20
4	10:16	SOU	Jerodd Sims 5-yard rush (Cesar Barajas kick) (5 plays, 54 yards, 2:17)	SOU 44–20
4	07:01	SOU	Brandon Hinton 6-yard pass from John Lampley (Cesar Barajas kick) (4 plays, 28 yards, 2:11)	SOU 51–20
4	04:18	TXSO	Richard Garcia III 34-yard field goal (9 plays, 42 yards, 2:39)	SOU 51–23

Over/under
SOU −11.5	57

Statistics	Southern	Texas Southern
First downs	24	22
Total yards	460	383
Rushing yards	258	102
Passing yards	202	281
Turnovers	1	2
Time of possession	32:51	27:09

Team	Category	Player	Statistics
Southern	Passing	Ladarius Skelton	11/18, 174 yards, 2 TDs, 1 INT
Southern	Rushing	Ladarius Skelton	14 carries, 71 yards
Southern	Receiving	Ethan Howard	2 receptions, 56 yards, 2 TDs
Texas Southern	Passing	Jalen Brown	21/37, 281 yards, 1 TD, 1 INT
Texas Southern	Rushing	Jacorey Howard	14 carries, 59 yards, 1 TD
Texas Southern	Receiving	Ke'Lenn Davis	3 receptions, 85 yards, 1 TD
