= 2020 Arkansas–Pine Bluff Golden Lions football team =

American college football season

2020 Arkansas–Pine Bluff Golden Lions football

SWAC West Division champion

SWAC Championship Game, L 33–40 vs. Alabama A&M
- Conference: Southwestern Athletic Conference
- West Division

Ranking
- STATS: No. 24
- FCS Coaches: No. 25
- Record: 4–1 (4–0 SWAC)
- Head coach: Doc Gamble (1st season)
- Offensive coordinator: Jermaine Gales (3rd season)
- Defensive coordinator: Jonathan Bradley (2nd season)
- Home stadium: Simmons Bank Field

2020 Southwestern Athletic Conference football standings
	Conf.			Overall
Team	W		L	W		L
East Division
No. 24 Alabama A&M x$	3	–	0	5	–	0
Alabama State	3	–	2	3	–	3
Jackson State	3	–	2	4	–	3
Mississippi Valley State	1	–	3	1	–	3
West Division
Arkansas–Pine Bluff x	4	–	0	4	–	1
Southern	4	–	1	5	–	1
Prairie View A&M*	2	–	1	2	–	1
Texas Southern	1	–	2	1	–	2
Grambling State	0	–	4	0	–	4
Championship: Alabama A&M 40, Arkansas–Pine Bluff 33
$ – Conference champion; x – Division champion/co-champions; Note: The SWAC played a spring conference-only schedule (February–May 2021) due to COVID-19 pandemic. Alcorn State opted out of the spring season; all of their scheduled games were counted as forfeit wins for their opponents. * – Ineligible for FCS postseason play due to NCAA sanctions.; Rankings from STATS Poll

The 2020 Arkansas–Pine Bluff Golden Lions football team represented the University of Arkansas at Pine Bluff in the 2020–21 NCAA Division I FCS football season. The Golden Lions were led by first-year head coach Doc Gamble and played their home games at Simmons Bank Field in Pine Bluff, Arkansas as members of the West Division of the Southwestern Athletic Conference (SWAC).

On July 20, 2020, the Southwestern Athletic Conference announced that it would not play fall sports due to the COVID-19 pandemic, which includes the football program. The conference is formalizing plans to conduct a competitive schedule for football during the 2021 spring semester.

== Schedule ==
Due to the SWAC's postponement of the 2020 football season to spring 2021, games against Bethune–Cookman, Miami (OH), and Troy were canceled. The SWAC released updated spring schedules on August 17.

Date	Time	Opponent	Rank	Site	TV	Result	Attendance
March 6	1:30 p.m.	at Southern		A. W. Mumford Stadium; Baton Rouge, LA	ESPN3	W 33–30	0
March 20	12:00 p.m.	at Grambling State		Eddie Robinson Stadium; Grambling, LA		W 48–21	5,105
April 3	3:00 p.m.	at Mississippi Valley State		Rice–Totten Stadium; Itta Bena, MS	ESPN3	W 24–17	0
April 17	3:00 p.m.	Prairie View A&M		Simmons Bank Field; Pine Bluff, AR		W 36–31	3,000
May 1	2:00 p.m.	vs. Alabama A&M	No. 24	Mississippi Veterans Memorial Stadium; Jackson, MS (SWAC Championship)	ESPN2	L 33–40	17,248
Rankings from STATS; All times are in Central time

== Game summaries ==
=== At Southern ===
Arkansas–Pine Bluff at Southern

Team	1	2	3	4	Total
• Golden Lions	3	23	7	0	33
Jaguars	7	7	3	13	30

- Date: March 6, 2021
- Location: Ace W. Mumford Stadium
  Baton Rouge, LA
- Game start: 1:36 p.m. CST
- Elapsed time: 3 hours and 33 minutes
- Game attendance: 0
- Game weather: 66 °F (19 °C) • Weather: Sunny • Wind: N 12 MPH
- Referee: Y. N. Meyers
- Television network: ESPN3

Scoring summary
1	12:20	UAPB	Zach Piwniczka 35-yard field goal (8 plays, 37 yards, 2:30)	UAPB 3–0
1	01:07	SOU	Jarod Sims 23-yard rush (Cesar Barajas kick) (15 plays, 98 yards, 6:53)	SOU 7–3
2	12:42	UAPB	Skyler Perry 31-yard rush (Zach Piwniczka kick)br/>(3 play, 46 yards, 0:43)	UAPB 10–7
2	08:02	SOU	Marquis McClain 13-yard pass from John Lampley (Cesar Barajas kick) (10 plays, 75 yards, 4:40)	SOU 14–10
2	05:19	UAPB	Team Safety (0 plays, 0 yards, 0:00)	SOU 14–12
2	02:38	UAPB	Josh Wilkes 14-yard pass from Skyler Perry (Zach Piwniczka kick) (7 plays, 60 yards, 2:41)	UAPB 19–14
2	00:02	UAPB	Harry Ballard III 2-yard pass from Skyler Perry (Zach Piwniczka kick) (8 plays, 76 yards, 1:50)	UAPB 26–14
3	07:08	UABP	Skyler Perry 2-yard rush (Zach Piwniczka kick) (12 play, 70 yards, 5:19)	UAPB 33–14
3	00:56	SOU	Cesar Barajas 36-yard field goal (4 plays, 4 yards, 1:26)	UAPB 33–17
4	14:09	SOU	Jamel Byrd 17-yard punt returned (two-point conversion pass attempt failed) (0 plays, 0 yards, 0:00)	UAPB 33–23
4	07:12	SOU	Jarod Sims 9-yard pass from John Lampley (Cesar Barajas kick) (9 plays, 80 yards, 3:03)	UAPB 33–30

Over/under
SOU −11.0	56

Statistics	Arkansas–Pine Bluff	Southern
First downs	20	23
Total yards	411	426
Rushing yards	188	134
Passing yards	223	292
Turnovers	0	4
Time of possession	30:26	29:34

Team	Category	Player	Statistics
Arkansas–Pine Bluff	Passing	Skyler Perry	22/37, 223 yards, 2 TDs
Arkansas–Pine Bluff	Rushing	Skyler Perry	8 carries, 58 yards, 2 TDs
Arkansas–Pine Bluff	Receiving	Tyrin Ralph	7 receptions, 86 yards
Southern	Passing	John Lampley	20/33, 238 yards, 2 TDs, 3 INTs
Southern	Rushing	Jarod Sims	11 carries, 55 yards, 1 TD
Southern	Receiving	Brandon Hinton	3 receptions, 60 yards

=== At Grambling State ===
Arkansas–Pine Bluff at Grambling State

Team	1	2	3	4	Total
• Golden Lions	7	7	28	6	48
Tigers	0	7	7	7	21

- Date: March 20, 2021
- Location: Eddie Robinson Stadium
  Grambling, LA
- Game start: 12:00 p.m. CDT
- Elapsed time: 3 hours and 15 minutes
- Game attendance: 5,105
- Game weather: 54 °F (12 °C)
- Referee: Gary Leeper

Scoring summary
1	12:14	UAPB	Jalon Thigpen 35-yard interception returned (Zach Piwniczka kick) (0 plays, 0 yards, 0:00)	UAPB 7–0
2	04:18	GRAM	CJ Russell 4-yard rush (Garrett Urban kick) (7 plays, 75 yards, 1:57)	TIE 7–7
2	03:34	UAPB	Harry Ballard III 58-yard pass from Skyler Perry (Zach Piwniczka kick)br/>(2 play, 60 yards, 0:38)	UAPB 14–7
3	13:58	UAPB	Josh Wilkes 60-yard pass from Skyler Perry (Zach Piwniczka kick) (3 plays, 60 yards, 1:02)	UAPB 21–7
3	09:29	UAPB	Mattias Clark 4-yard rush (Zach Piwniczka kick) (10 plays, 61 yards, 3:24)	UAPB 28–7
3	07:23	GRAM	Kobe' Ross 39-yard pass from Elijah Walker (Garrett Urban kick) (7 plays, 73 yards, 1:59)	UAPB 28–14
3	03:09	UAPB	Terrill McCray III 7-yard blocked punt returned (Zach Piwniczka kick) (0 plays, 0 yards, 0:00)	UAPB 35–14
3	00:48	UABP	Jeremy Brown 28-yard pass from Skyler Perry (Zach Piwniczka kick) (2 play, 36 yards, 0:52)	UAPB 42–14
4	12:00	UAPB	Jeremy Brown 31-yard pass from Skyler Perry (Zach Pwiniczka kick) (10 plays, 70 yards, 1:50)	UAPB 48–14
4	09:04	GRAM	Kash Foley 77-yard pass from Keilon Elder (Garrett Urban kick) (2 plays, 77 yards, 0:58)	UAPB 48–21

Over/under
GRAM −6.0	53

Statistics	Arkansas–Pine Bluff	Grambling State
First downs	18	16
Total yards	402	368
Rushing yards	56	87
Passing yards	346	281
Turnovers	1	1
Time of possession	27:53	32:07

Team	Category	Player	Statistics
Arkansas–Pine Bluff	Passing	Skyler Perry	18/30, 346 yards, 4 TDs, 1 INT
Arkansas–Pine Bluff	Rushing	Omar Allen Jr.	11 carries, 42 yards
Arkansas–Pine Bluff	Receiving	Josh Wilkes	6 receptions, 131 yards, 1 TD
Grambling State	Passing	Elijah Walker	13/26, 174 yards, 1 TD, 1 INT
Grambling State	Rushing	Keilon Elder	11 carries, 65 yards
Grambling State	Receiving	Kash Foley	5 receptions, 111 yards, 1 TD

=== At Mississippi Valley State ===
Arkansas–Pine Bluff at Mississippi Valley State

Team	1	2	3	4	Total
• Golden Lions	0	17	0	7	24
Delta Devils	3	0	7	7	17

- Date: April 3, 2021
- Location: Rice–Totten Stadium
  Itta Bena, MS
- Game start: 3:00 p.m. CDT
- Elapsed time: 3 hours and 11 minutes
- Game attendance: 0
- Game weather: 66 °F (19 °C) • Weather: Clear • Wind: S 5 MPH

Scoring summary
1	10:00	MVSU	Orlando Fernandez 46-yard field goal (6 plays, 39 yards, 3:08)	MVSU 3–0
2	14:56	UAPB	DeJuan Miller 8-yard pass from Skyler Perry (Zach Piwniczka kick) (4 plays, 41 yards, 1:20)	UAPB 7–3
2	12:54	UAPB	Josh Wilkes 4-yard pass from Skyler Perry (Zach Piwniczka kick)br/>(7 play, 48 yards, 2:02)	UAPB 14–3
2	00:02	UAPB	Zach Piwniczka 17-yard field goal (12 plays, 58 yards, 4:18)	UAPB 17–3
3	11:57	MVSU	Caleb Johnson 4-yard rush (Orlando Fernandez kick) (7 plays, 76 yards, 2:54)	UAPB 17–10
4	07:55	MVSU	Caleb Johnson 50-yard rush (Orlando Fernandez kick) (1 play, 50 yards, 0:08)	TIE 17–17
4	01:54	UAPB	Tyrin Ralph 77-yard punt returned (Zach Piwniczka kick) (0 plays, 0 yards, 0:00)	UAPB 24–17

Over/under
UAPB −18.0	58

Statistics	Arkansas–Pine Bluff	Mississippi Valley State
First downs	16	13
Total yards	334	248
Rushing yards	82	144
Passing yards	252	104
Turnovers	0	1
Time of possession	29:49	30:11

Team	Category	Player	Statistics
Arkansas–Pine Bluff	Passing	Skyler Perry	23/42, 235 yards, 2 TDs, 1 INT
Arkansas–Pine Bluff	Rushing	Mattias Clark	18 carries, 75 yards
Arkansas–Pine Bluff	Receiving	Harry Ballard III	5 receptions, 70 yards
Mississippi Valley State	Passing	Jalani Eason	14/24, 104 yards
Mississippi Valley State	Rushing	Caleb Johnson	13 carries, 70 yards, 2 TDs
Mississippi Valley State	Receiving	Malik Myers	4 receptions, 56 yards

=== Prairie View A&M ===
Prairie View A&M at Arkansas–Pine Bluff

Team	1	2	3	4	Total
Panthers	14	7	3	7	31
• Golden Lions	7	20	3	6	36

- Date: April 17, 2021
- Location: Simmons Bank Field
  Pine Bluff, AR
- Game start: 3:00 p.m. CDT
- Elapsed time: 3 hours and 45 minutes
- Game attendance: 3,000
- Game weather: 79 °F (26 °C) • Weather: Clear

Scoring summary
1	12:08	PVAMU	Khristopher Simmons 28-yard pass from Trazon Connley (Carlos Villagomez kick) (5 plays, 73 yards, 2:44)	PVAMU 7–0
1	08:40	UAPB	Harry Ballard III 34-yard pass from Skyler Perry (Zach Piwniczka kick) (7 plays, 75 yards, 2:42)	TIE 7–7
1	02:23	PVAMU	Tony Mullins 3-yard rush (Carlos Villagomez kick)br/>(2 play, 47 yards, 0:23)	PVAMU 14–7
2	13:21	UAPB	Skyler Perry 1-yard rush (Zach Piwniczka kick) (10 plays, 67 yards, 4:02)	TIE 14–14
2	10:42	UAPB	Josh Wilkes 5-yard pass from Skyler Perry (Zach Piwniczka PAT blocked) (3 plays, 2 yards, 1:15)	UAPB 20–14
2	08:52	PVAMU	Travis O'Connor 18-yard pass from Trazon Connley (Carlos Villagomez kick) (7 plays, 75 yards, 1:50)	PVAMU 21–20
2	06:36	UAPB	Tyrin Ralph 31-yard pass from Skyler Perry (Zach Piwniczka kick) (6 plays, 60 yards, 2:16)	UAPB 27–21
3	12:37	UAPB	Zach Piwniczka 42-yard field goal (4 plays, 4 yards, 0:41)	UAPB 30–21
3	07:02	PVAMU	Carlos Villagomez 25-yard field goal (6 plays, 38 yards, 2:15)	UAPB 30–24
4	12:14	UAPB	Josh Wilkes 3-yard pass from Skyler Perry (two-point pass conversion attempt failed) (11 plays, 61 yards, 5:11)	UAPB 36–24
4	07:06	PVAMU	Kalen Riles 7-yard pass from Trazon Connley (Carlos Villagomez kick) (9 plays, 75 yards, 3:55)	UAPB 36–31

Over/under
UAPB −1.0	52

Statistics	Prairie View A&M	Arkansas–Pine Bluff
First downs	24	18
Total yards	410	346
Rushing yards	70	145
Passing yards	340	201
Turnovers	5	4
Time of possession	29:45	30:15

Team	Category	Player	Statistics
Prairie View A&M	Passing	Trazon Connley	24/49, 341 yards, 3 TDs, 3 INTs
Prairie View A&M	Rushing	Trazon Connley	13 carries, 67 yards
Prairie View A&M	Receiving	Tony Mullins	10 receptions, 114 yards
Arkansas–Pine Bluff	Passing	Skyler Perry	16/33, 201 yards, 4 TDs, 1 INT
Arkansas–Pine Bluff	Rushing	Skyler Perry	12 carries, 45 yards, 1 TD
Arkansas–Pine Bluff	Receiving	Tyrin Ralph	7 receptions, 100 yards, 1 TD

=== Vs. Alabama A&M ===
Arkansas–Pine Bluff vs. Alabama A&M

Team	1	2	3	4	Total
No. 24 Golden Lions	14	12	0	7	33
• Bulldogs	10	8	14	8	40

- Date: May 1, 2021
- Location: Mississippi Veterans Memorial Stadium
  Jackson, MS
- Game start: 2:06 p.m. CDT
- Elapsed time: 3 hours and 45 minutes
- Game attendance: 17,248
- Game weather: 79 °F (26 °C) • Weather: Partly Cloudy • Wind: SE 8 MPH
- Referee: Marty Adams
- Television network: ESPN2

Scoring summary
1	13:29	AAMU	Spencer Corey 29-yard field goal (7 plays, 67 yards, 1:31)	AAMU 3–0
1	10:24	UAPB	Mattias Clark 4-yard rush (Zach Piwniczka kick) (7 plays, 46 yards, 3:05)	UAPB 7–3
1	07:38	AAMU	Zabrian Moore 30-yard pass from Aqeel Glass (Spencer Corey kick)br/>(8 play, 75 yards, 2:46)	AAMU 10–7
1	07:26	UAPB	Tyrin Ralph 81-yard kickoff returned (Zach Piwniczka kick) (0 plays, 0 yards, 0:12)	UAPB 14–10
2	11:07	AAMU	Gary Quarles 3-yard rush (Spencer Corey PAT blocked) (9 plays, 43 yards, 3:41)	AAMU 16–14
2	07:04	UAPB	DeJuan Miller 5-yard pass from Taylor Holston (Zach Piwniczka PAT blocked) (9 plays, 71 yards, 4:03)	UAPB 20–16
2	07:04	AAMU	Ja'Marian Green Defensive PAT conversion (9 plays, 71 yards, 4:03)	UAPB 20–18
2	05:17	UAPB	Kolby Watts 33-yard fumble returned (3 plays, 3 yards, 1:47)	UAPB 26–18
3	08:00	AAMU	Anthony Howard 7-yard pass from Aqeel Glass (Spencer Corey kick) (12 plays, 79 yards, 4:55)	UAPB 26–25
3	01:24	AAMU	Gary Quarles 3-yard rush (Spencer Corey kick) (8 plays, 80 yards, 3:15)	AAMU 32–26
4	07:16	AAMU	Zabrian Moore 13-yard pass from Aqeel Glass (Aqeel Glass two-point conversion pass to Terrell Gardner) (7 plays, 66 yards, 2:40)	AAMU 40–26
4	02:30	UAPB	Josh Wilkes 11-yard pass from Skylar Perry (Zach Piwniczka kick) (11 plays, 72 yards, 2:41)	AAMU 40–33

Over/under
AAMU −3.5	61

Statistics	Arkansas–Pine Bluff	Alabama A&M
First downs	18	30
Total yards	324	368
Rushing yards	88	97
Passing yards	236	271
Turnovers	4	2
Time of possession	26:06	33:54

Team	Category	Player	Statistics
Arkansas–Pine Bluff	Passing	Skyler Perry	23/36, 231 yards, 1 TD, 3 INTs
Arkansas–Pine Bluff	Rushing	Skyler Perry	16 carries, 71 yards
Arkansas–Pine Bluff	Receiving	DeJuan Miller	6 receptions, 69 yards, 1 TD
Alabama A&M	Passing	Aqeel Glass	24/45, 271 yards, 3 TDs, 1 INT
Alabama A&M	Rushing	Gary Quarles	23 carries, 69 yards, 2 TDs
Alabama A&M	Receiving	Zabrian Moore	5 receptions, 111 yards, 2 TDs
