= 2020 Alabama A&M Bulldogs football team =

American college football season

2020 Alabama A&M Bulldogs football

Black college national champion SWAC champion SWAC East Division champion

SWAC Championship Game, W 40–33 vs. Arkansas–Pine Bluff
- Conference: Southwestern Athletic Conference
- East Division

Ranking
- STATS: No. 24
- FCS Coaches: No. 19
- Record: 5–0 (3–0 SWAC)
- Head coach: Connell Maynor (3rd season)
- Offensive coordinator: Duane Taylor (3rd season)
- Defensive coordinator: Granville Eastman (2nd season)
- Home stadium: Louis Crews Stadium

2020 Southwestern Athletic Conference football standings
	Conf.			Overall
Team	W		L	W		L
East Division
No. 24 Alabama A&M x$	3	–	0	5	–	0
Alabama State	3	–	2	3	–	3
Jackson State	3	–	2	4	–	3
Mississippi Valley State	1	–	3	1	–	3
West Division
Arkansas–Pine Bluff x	4	–	0	4	–	1
Southern	4	–	1	5	–	1
Prairie View A&M*	2	–	1	2	–	1
Texas Southern	1	–	2	1	–	2
Grambling State	0	–	4	0	–	4
Championship: Alabama A&M 40, Arkansas–Pine Bluff 33
$ – Conference champion; x – Division champion/co-champions; Note: The SWAC played a spring conference-only schedule (February–May 2021) due to COVID-19 pandemic. Alcorn State opted out of the spring season; all of their scheduled games were counted as forfeit wins for their opponents. * – Ineligible for FCS postseason play due to NCAA sanctions.; Rankings from STATS Poll

The 2020 Alabama A&M Bulldogs football team represented Alabama Agricultural and Mechanical University in the 2020–21 NCAA Division I FCS football season. The Bulldogs were led by third-year head coach Connell Maynor and played their home games at Louis Crews Stadium in Huntsville, Alabama as members of the East Division of the Southwestern Athletic Conference. On July 20, 2020, the Southwestern Athletic Conference announced that it would not play fall sports due to the COVID-19 pandemic.

On May 3, 2021, A&M was voted HBCU National Champions by the BOXTOROW Coaches and Media Polls, after finishing the season undefeated. Their selections marks the first time in history the Bulldogs finished the season ranked as the #1 team in black college football. A&M ended ranked #19 in the 2020–21 Division I FCS Coaches Poll, head coach Maynor was a finalist for the Eddie Robinson Award for the top coach in FCS, and QB Aqeel Glass was a finalist for Walter Payton Award for best FCS player.

== Schedule ==
Due to the SWAC's postponement of the 2020 football season to spring 2021, games against Mississippi State, Stephen F. Austin, and UAB were canceled. The SWAC released updated spring schedules on August 17. Initially, A&M's spring schedule featured 6 games, 3 away, 2 home and the Magic City Classic. The Bulldogs won their first game via forfeit after Alcorn opted out of their spring season. Additionally, games against Mississippi Valley State and Prairie View A&M were postponed and later canceled due to COVID cases in their respective programs. On March 3, the Bulldogs added a non-conference game against South Carolina State. Their last scheduled home contest against Grambling State was also canceled without a makeup game schedule. Alabama A&M lost its final opportunity to host a game at Louis Crews Stadium when the SWAC moved its championship game to a neutral site due to confusion over tiebreakers as a result of COVID related cancellations.

Date	Time	Opponent	Site	TV	Result	Attendance
February 27		Alcorn State	Louis Crews Stadium; Huntsville, AL		W 2–0 (forfeit)	
March 6	12:30 p.m.	at South Carolina State*	Oliver C. Dawson Stadium; Orangeburg, SC	ESPN3	W 31–7	4,841
April 10	2:00 p.m.	at Jackson State	Mississippi Veterans Memorial Stadium; Jackson, MS	ESPN	W 52–43	20,051
April 17	6:30 p.m.	vs. Alabama State	Legion Field; Birmingham, AL (Magic City Classic)	ESPNU	W 38–14	16,500
May 1	2:00 p.m.	vs. No. 24 Arkansas–Pine Bluff	Mississippi Veterans Memorial Stadium; Jackson, MS (SWAC Championship)	ESPN2	W 40–33	17,248
*Non-conference game; Rankings from STATS; All times are in Central time

== Game summaries ==
=== At South Carolina State ===
Alabama A&M at South Carolina State

Team	1	2	3	4	Total
• AAMU Bulldogs	0	14	14	3	31
SCSU Bulldogs	0	0	0	7	7

- Date: March 6, 2021
- Location: Oliver C. Dawson Stadium
  Orangeburg, SC
- Game start: 1:30 p.m. CST
- Elapsed time: 3 hours and 9 minutes
- Game attendance: 4,841
- Game weather: 50 °F (10 °C) • Weather: Partly Cloudy
- Referee: Roy Bernard
- Television network: ESPN3

Scoring summary
2	09:08	AAMU	Abdul-Fatai Ibrahim 16-yard pass from Aqeel Glass (Spencer Corey kick) (4 plays, 55 yards, 1:01)	AAMU 7–0
2	00:21	AAMU	Odieu Hiliare 18-yard pass from Aqeel Glass (Spencer Corey kick) (3 plays, 3 yards, 0:51)	AAMU 14–0
3	13:22	AAMU	Dami Adekunjo 65-yard pass from Aqeel Glass (Spencer Corey kick)br/>(1 play, 65 yards, 0:17)	AAMU 21–0
3	04:43	AAMU	Brian Jenkins Jr. 20-yard pass from Aqeel Glass (Spencer Corey kick) (3 plays, 20 yards, 1:47)	AAMU 28–0
4	13:36	SCSU	Alex James 23-yard rush (Jarrod Jones kick) (3 plays, 5 yards, 1:56)	AAMU 28–7
4	07:52	AAMU	Spencer Corey 37-yard field goal (9 plays, 80 yards, 3:54)	AAMU 31–7

Over/under
SCSU −10.0	53

Statistics	Alabama A&M	South Carolina State
First downs	20	14
Total yards	433	297
Rushing yards	161	165
Passing yards	272	132
Turnovers	3	5
Time of possession	32:11	27:49

Team	Category	Player	Statistics
Alabama A&M	Passing	Aqeel Glass	15/33, 272 yards, 4 TDs, 3 INTs
Alabama A&M	Rushing	Gary Quarles	21 carries, 87 yards
Alabama A&M	Receiving	Abdul-Fatai Ibrahim	6 receptions, 81 yards, 1 TD
South Carolina State	Passing	Corey Fields	10/22, 132 yards, 2 INTs
South Carolina State	Rushing	Kendrall Flowers	13 carries, 115 yards
South Carolina State	Receiving	Shaquan Davis	2 receptions, 51 yards

=== At Jackson State ===
Alabama A&M at Jackson State

Team	1	2	3	4	Total
• Bulldogs	7	21	10	14	52
Tigers	7	14	7	15	43

- Date: April 10, 2021
- Location: Mississippi Veterans Memorial Stadium
  Jackson, MS
- Game start: 2:00 p.m. CDT
- Elapsed time: 3 hours and 37 minutes
- Game attendance: 20,051
- Game weather: 75 °F (24 °C) • Weather: Mostly Clear • Wind: WSW 13 MPH
- Television network: ESPN

Scoring summary
1	11:50	AAMU	Abdul-Fatai Ibrahim 9-yard pass from Aqeel Glass (Spencer Corey kick) (9 plays, 74 yards, 3:10)	AAMU 7–0
1	02:33	JSU	Warren Newman 6-yard rush (Glenn Misiak kick) (8 plays, 66 yards, 3:29)	TIE 7–7
2	13:37	JSU	Santee Marshall 54-yard rush (Glenn Misiak kick)br/>(3 play, 65 yards, 1:10)	JSU 14–7
2	12:14	AAMU	Gary Quarles 43-yard pass from Aqeel Glass (Spencer Corey kick) (4 plays, 65 yards, 1:23)	TIE 14–14
2	08:04	AAMU	Aqeel Glass 5-yard rush (Spencer Corey kick) (6 plays, 48 yards, 2:46)	AAMU 21–14
2	04:32	JSU	Warren Newman 17-yard pass from Quincy Casey (Glenn Misiak kick) (8 plays, 53 yards, 3:21)	TIE 21–21
2	03:45	AAMU	Zabrian Moore 61-yard pass from Aqeel Glass (Spencer Corey kick) (2 plays, 80 yards, 0:38)	AAMU 28–21
3	12:04	AAMU	Odieu Hilaire 11-yard pass from Aqeel Glass (Spencer Corey kick) (4 plays, 70 yards, 1:22)	AAMU 35–21
3	09:49	JSU	Daylen Baldwin 24-yard pass from Quincy Casey (Glenn Misiak kick) (5 plays, 61 yards, 2:08)	AAMU 35–28
3	03:41	AAMU	Spencer Corey 34-yard field goal (8 plays, 33 yards, 3:02)	AAMU 38–28
4	14:29	AAMU	Abdul-Fatai Ibrahim 25-yard pass from Aqeel Glass (Spencer Corey kick) (7 plays, 75 yards, 2:25)	AAMU 45–28
4	06:59	JSU	Warren Newman 7-yard pass from Quincy Casey (Glenn Misiak kick) (11 plays, 79 yards, 3:51)	AAMU 45–35
4	02:49	AAMU	Anthony Howard 4-yard pass from Aqeel Glass (Spencer Corey kick) (10 plays, 75 yards, 4:10)	AAMU 52–35
4	01:29	JSU	Warren Newman 7-yard pass from Quincy Casey (Quincy Casey two-point conversion pass to Corey Reed Jr.) (5 plays, 67 yards, 1:13)	AAMU 52–43

Over/under
SCSU −10.0	53

Statistics	Alabama A&M	Jackson State
First downs	28	26
Total yards	533	463
Rushing yards	93	140
Passing yards	440	323
Turnovers	0	0
Time of possession	29:12	30:48

Team	Category	Player	Statistics
Alabama A&M	Passing	Aqeel Glass	27/40, 440 yards, 6 TDs
Alabama A&M	Rushing	Gary Quarles	16 carries, 86 yards
Alabama A&M	Receiving	Zabrian Moore	4 receptions, 114 yards, 1 TD
Jackson State	Passing	Quincy Casey	30/47, 323 yards, 4 TDs
Jackson State	Rushing	Santee Marshall	19 carries, 126 yards, 1 TD
Jackson State	Receiving	Daylen Baldwin	6 receptions, 135 yards, 1 TD

=== Vs. Alabama State ===
Alabama State vs. Alabama A&M

Team	1	2	3	4	Total
Hornets	7	7	0	0	14
• Bulldogs	7	10	14	7	38

- Date: April 17, 2021
- Location: Legion Field
  Birmingham, AL
- Game start: 6:30 p.m. CDT
- Elapsed time: 3 hours and 45 minutes
- Game attendance: 16,500
- Game weather: 71 °F (22 °C) • Weather: Light Clouds
- Television network: ESPNU

Scoring summary
1	08:30	ALST	Jacory Merritt 1-yard rush (Hunter Hanson kick) (11 plays, 95 yards, 0:00)	ALST 7–0
1	03:14	AAMU	Gary Quarles 7-yard rush (Spencer Corey kick) (9 plays, 78 yards, 0:00)	TIE 7–7
2	07:30	ALST	Michael Jefferson 9-yard pass from Chris Scott (Hunter Hanson kick)br/>(11 plays, 58 yards, 5:40)	ALST 14–7
2	06:42	AAMU	Gary Quarles 15-yard rush (Spencer Corey kick) (5 plays, 85 yards, 0:42)	TIE 14–14
2	00:00	AAMU	Spencer Corey 46-yard field goal (1 play, 0 yards, 0:04)	AAMU 17–14
3	12:13	AAMU	Zabrian Moore 44-yard pass from Aqeel Glass (Spencer Corey kick) (9 plays, 78 yards, 2:47)	AAMU 24–14
3	03:17	AAMU	Zabrian Moore 38-yard pass from Aqeel Glass (Spencer Corey kick) (10 plays, 99 yards, 4:28)	AAMU 31–14
4	12:31	AAMU	Odieu Hilaire 2-yard pass from Aqeel Glass (Spencer Corey kick) (9 plays, 52 yards, 3:32)	AAMU 38–14

Over/under
AAMU −4.5	52

Statistics	Alabama State	Alabama A&M
First downs	20	24
Total yards	285	484
Rushing yards	181	112
Passing yards	104	372
Turnovers	0	0
Time of possession	31:12	28:48

Team	Category	Player	Statistics
Alabama State	Passing	Chris Scott	13/28, 89 yards, 1 TD
Alabama State	Rushing	Ezra Gray	19 carries, 101 yards
Alabama State	Receiving	Jahod Booker	5 receptions, 58 yards
Alabama A&M	Passing	Aqeel Glass	25/40, 372 yards, 3 TDs
Alabama A&M	Rushing	Aqeel Glass	5 carries, 45 yards
Alabama A&M	Receiving	Zabrian Moore	4 receptions, 138 yards, 2 TDs

=== Vs. Arkansas–Pine Bluff ===
Arkansas–Pine Bluff vs. Alabama A&M

Team	1	2	3	4	Total
No. 24 Golden Lions	14	12	0	7	33
• Bulldogs	10	8	14	8	40

- Date: May 1, 2021
- Location: Mississippi Veterans Memorial Stadium
  Jackson, MS
- Game start: 2:06 p.m. CDT
- Elapsed time: 3 hours and 45 minutes
- Game attendance: 17,248
- Game weather: 79 °F (26 °C) • Weather: Partly Cloudy • Wind: SE 8 MPH
- Referee: Marty Adams
- Television network: ESPN2

Scoring summary
1	13:29	AAMU	Spencer Corey 29-yard field goal (7 plays, 67 yards, 1:31)	AAMU 3–0
1	10:24	UAPB	Mattias Clark 4-yard rush (Zach Piwniczka kick) (7 plays, 46 yards, 3:05)	UAPB 7–3
1	07:38	AAMU	Zabrian Moore 30-yard pass from Aqeel Glass (Spencer Corey kick)br/>(8 play, 75 yards, 2:46)	AAMU 10–7
1	07:26	UAPB	Tyrin Ralph 81-yard kickoff returned (Zach Piwniczka kick) (0 plays, 0 yards, 0:12)	UAPB 14–10
2	11:07	AAMU	Gary Quarles 3-yard rush (Spencer Corey PAT blocked) (9 plays, 43 yards, 3:41)	AAMU 16–14
2	07:04	UAPB	DeJuan Miller 5-yard pass from Taylor Holston (Zach Piwniczka PAT blocked) (9 plays, 71 yards, 4:03)	UAPB 20–16
2	07:04	AAMU	Ja'Marian Green Defensive PAT conversion (9 plays, 71 yards, 4:03)	UAPB 20–18
2	05:17	UAPB	Kolby Watts 33-yard fumble returned (3 plays, 3 yards, 1:47)	UAPB 26–18
3	08:00	AAMU	Anthony Howard 7-yard pass from Aqeel Glass (Spencer Corey kick) (12 plays, 79 yards, 4:55)	UAPB 26–25
3	01:24	AAMU	Gary Quarles 3-yard rush (Spencer Corey kick) (8 plays, 80 yards, 3:15)	AAMU 32–26
4	07:16	AAMU	Zabrian Moore 13-yard pass from Aqeel Glass (Aqeel Glass two-point conversion pass to Terrell Gardner) (7 plays, 66 yards, 2:40)	AAMU 40–26
4	02:30	UAPB	Josh Wilkes 11-yard pass from Skylar Perry (Zach Piwniczka kick) (11 plays, 72 yards, 2:41)	AAMU 40–33

Over/under
AAMU −3.5	61

Statistics	Arkansas–Pine Bluff	Alabama A&M
First downs	18	30
Total yards	324	368
Rushing yards	88	97
Passing yards	236	271
Turnovers	4	2
Time of possession	26:06	33:54

Team	Category	Player	Statistics
Arkansas–Pine Bluff	Passing	Skyler Perry	23/36, 231 yards, 1 TD, 3 INTs
Arkansas–Pine Bluff	Rushing	Skyler Perry	16 carries, 71 yards
Arkansas–Pine Bluff	Receiving	DeJuan Miller	6 receptions, 69 yards, 1 TD
Alabama A&M	Passing	Aqeel Glass	24/45, 271 yards, 3 TDs, 1 INT
Alabama A&M	Rushing	Gary Quarles	23 carries, 69 yards, 2 TDs
Alabama A&M	Receiving	Zabrian Moore	5 receptions, 111 yards, 2 TDs

== Postseason honors ==
=== Deacon Jones Trophy/Black College Football Player of the Year ===
- QB Aqeel Glass

=== BOXTOROW HBCU Player of the Year ===
- QB Aqeel Glass

=== BOXTOROW HBCU All-American First-Team ===
- QB Aqeel Glass
- OL Jonathan Williams
- WR Abdul-Fatai Ibrahim
- DL Marcus Cushnie

=== BOXTOROW HBCU All-American Honorable Mention ===
- RB Gary Quarles
- WR Zabrian Moore

=== SWAC Player of the Year ===
- QB Aqeel Glass

=== All-SWAC First Team ===
- QB Aqeel Glass
- OL Dexter Fuqua
- WR Abdul-Fatai Ibrahim
- DL Marcus Cushnie

=== All-SWAC Second Team ===
- RB Gary Quarles
- OL Antearius Harrington
- OL Jonathan Williams
- WR Zabrian Moore
- LB Armoni Holloway
- DB Amari Holloway
- K Spencer Corey
