= 2020 Prairie View A&M Panthers football team =

American college football season

2020 Prairie View A&M Panthers football
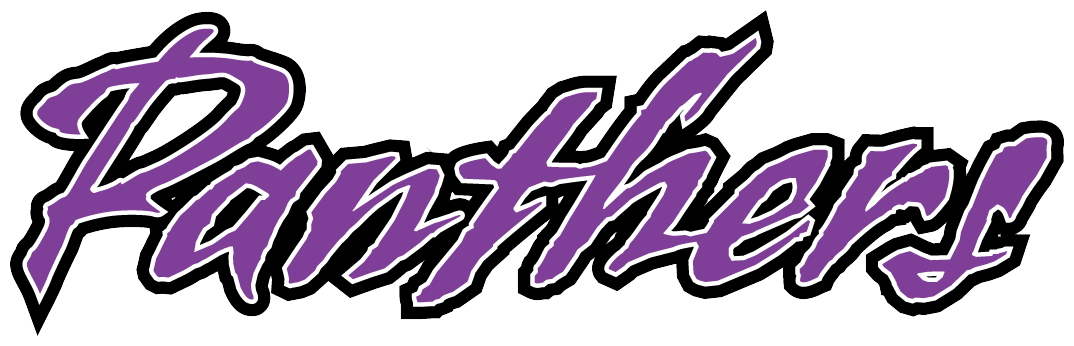
- Conference: Southwestern Athletic Conference
- West Division
- Record: 2–1 (2–1 SWAC)
- Head coach: Eric Dooley (3rd season)
- Home stadium: Panther Stadium at Blackshear Field

2020 Southwestern Athletic Conference football standings
	Conf.			Overall
Team	W		L	W		L
East Division
No. 24 Alabama A&M x$	3	–	0	5	–	0
Alabama State	3	–	2	3	–	3
Jackson State	3	–	2	4	–	3
Mississippi Valley State	1	–	3	1	–	3
West Division
Arkansas–Pine Bluff x	4	–	0	4	–	1
Southern	4	–	1	5	–	1
Prairie View A&M*	2	–	1	2	–	1
Texas Southern	1	–	2	1	–	2
Grambling State	0	–	4	0	–	4
Championship: Alabama A&M 40, Arkansas–Pine Bluff 33
$ – Conference champion; x – Division champion/co-champions; Note: The SWAC played a spring conference-only schedule (February–May 2021) due to COVID-19 pandemic. Alcorn State opted out of the spring season; all of their scheduled games were counted as forfeit wins for their opponents. * – Ineligible for FCS postseason play due to NCAA sanctions.; Rankings from STATS Poll

The 2020 Prairie View A&M Panthers football team represented Prairie View A&M University in the 2020 NCAA Division I FCS football season. The Panthers were led by third-year head coach Eric Dooley, who played their home games at Panther Stadium at Blackshear Field in Prairie View, Texas as members of the West Division of the Southwestern Athletic Conference (SWAC).

On July 20, 2020, the Southwestern Athletic Conference announced that it would not play fall sports due to the COVID-19 pandemic, which includes the football program. The conference formalized plans to conduct a competitive schedule for football during the 2021 spring semester.

== Schedule ==
Due to the SWAC's postponement of the 2020 football season to spring 2021, games against Louisiana Tech, Northwestern State, and TCU were canceled. The SWAC released updated spring schedules on August 17.

Date	Time	Opponent	Site	TV	Result	Attendance
March 6	7:00 p.m.	Texas Southern	Panther Stadium at Blackshear Field; Prairie View, TX (Labor Day Classic)	ESPN3	W 20–19	3,750
March 13	3:00 p.m.	vs. Grambling State	Globe Life Park; Arlington, TX (State Fair Classic)		W 17–10	10,500
April 17	3:00 p.m.	at Arkansas–Pine Bluff	Simmons Bank Field; Pine Bluff, AR		L 31–36	3,000
Rankings from STATS Poll released prior to the game; All times are in Central time

== Game summaries ==
=== Texas Southern ===
Texas Southern at Prairie View A&M

Team	1	2	3	4	Total
Tigers	0	7	9	3	19
• Panthers	10	3	0	7	20

- Date: March 6, 2021
- Location: Panther Stadium at Blackshear Field
  Prairie View, TX
- Game start: 7:06 p.m. CDT
- Elapsed time: 3 hours and 39 minutes
- Game attendance: 3,750
- Game weather: 57 °F (14 °C) • Weather: Clear
- Referee: Marty Adams
- Television network: ESPN3

Scoring summary
1	07:25	PVAMU	Luis Reyes 31-yard field goal (9 plays, 42 yards, 3:48)	PVAMU 3–0
1	02:45	PVAMU	Ahmad Antoine 3-yard rush (Luis Reyes kick) (5 plays, 55 yards, 3:14)	PVAMU 10–0
2	01:03	PVAMU	Luis Reyes 23-yard field goal (6 plays, 66 yards, 1:55)	PVAMU 13–0
2	00:01	TXSO	Jonathan Giles 2-yard pass from Thaddeus Peyton (Richard Garcia III kick) (5 plays, 52 yards, 0:55)	PVAMU 13–7
3	09:10	TXSO	Team Safety (0 plays, 0 yards, 0:00)	PVAMU 13–9
3	06:28	TXSO	Osby Mitchell 4-yard pass from Thaddeus Peyton (Richard Garcia III kick) (7 plays, 72 yards, 2:37)	PVAMU 16–13
4	11:34	TXSO	Richard Garcia III 38-yard field goal (10 plays, 34 yards, 4:14)	TXSO 19–13
4	01:40	PVAMU	Kristian Mosley 4-yard rush (Luis Reyes kick) (11 plays, 79 yards, 3:11)	PVAMU 20–19

Statistics	Texas Southern	Prairie View A&M
First downs	17	18
Total yards	327	320
Rushing yards	148	82
Passing yards	179	238
Turnovers	2	1
Time of possession	31:23	28:37

Team	Category	Player	Statistics
Texas Southern	Passing	Thaddeus Peyton	16/21, 137 yards, 2 TDs
Texas Southern	Rushing	LaDarius Owens	20 carries, 119 yards
Texas Southern	Receiving	Ke'Lenn Davis	4 receptions, 43 yards
Prairie View A&M	Passing	TJ Starks	10/21, 157 yards, 1 INT
Prairie View A&M	Rushing	TJ Starks	6 carries, 27 yards
Prairie View A&M	Receiving	Kalen Riles	3 receptions, 56 yards

=== Vs. Grambling State ===
Prairie View A&M vs. Grambling State

Team	1	2	3	4	Total
• Panthers	3	7	7	0	17
Tigers	0	0	10	0	10

- Date: March 13, 2021
- Location: Globe Life Park
  Arlington, TX
- Game start: 3:00 p.m. CST
- Elapsed time: 3 hours and 20 minutes
- Game attendance: 10,500
- Game weather: 75 °F (24 °C) • Weather: Light Rain
- Referee: Tony Ross

Scoring summary
1	05:10	PVAMU	Luis Reyes 36-yard field goal (19 plays, 59 yards, 6:50)	PVAMU 3–0
2	14:31	PVAMU	TJ Starks 6-yard rush (Luis Reyes kick) (9 plays, 67 yards, 3:29)	PVAMU 10–0
3	10:27	GRAM	Garrett Urban 46-yard field goal (12 plays, 64 yards, 4:24)	PVAMU 10–3
3	08:21	PVAMU	Chris Johnson 60-yard pass from Trazon Connley (Luis Reyes kick) (5 plays, 69 yards, 2:06)	PVAMU 17–3
3	00:58	GRAM	Lyndemian Brooks 1-yard rush (Garrett Urban kick) (3 plays, 41 yards, 0:56)	PVAMU 17–10

Statistics	Prairie View A&M	Grambling State
First downs	18	17
Total yards	370	308
Rushing yards	153	105
Passing yards	217	203
Turnovers	2	1
Time of possession	43:05	28:46

Team	Category	Player	Statistics
Prairie View A&M	Passing	Trazon Connley	8/12, 152 yards, 1 TD
Prairie View A&M	Rushing	Kristian Mosley	18 carries, 74 yards
Prairie View A&M	Receiving	Chris Johnson	3 receptions, 108 yards, 1 TD
Grambling State	Passing	Geremy Hickbottom	11/16, 113 yards, 2 INTs
Grambling State	Rushing	Lyndemian Brooks	11 carries, 61 yards
Grambling State	Receiving	Darrell Clark	6 receptions, 91 yards

=== At Arkansas–Pine Bluff ===
Prairie View A&M at Arkansas–Pine Bluff

Team	1	2	3	4	Total
Panthers	14	7	3	7	31
• Golden Lions	7	20	3	6	36

- Date: April 17, 2021
- Location: Simmons Bank Field
  Pine Bluff, AR
- Game start: 3:00 p.m. CDT
- Elapsed time: 3 hours and 45 minutes
- Game attendance: 3,000
- Game weather: 79 °F (26 °C) • Weather: Clear

Scoring summary
1	12:08	PVAMU	Khristopher Simmons 28-yard pass from Trazon Connley (Carlos Villagomez kick) (5 plays, 73 yards, 2:44)	PVAMU 7–0
1	08:40	UAPB	Harry Ballard III 34-yard pass from Skyler Perry (Zach Piwniczka kick) (7 plays, 75 yards, 2:42)	TIE 7–7
1	02:23	PVAMU	Tony Mullins 3-yard rush (Carlos Villagomez kick)br/>(2 play, 47 yards, 0:23)	PVAMU 14–7
2	13:21	UAPB	Skyler Perry 1-yard rush (Zach Piwniczka kick) (10 plays, 67 yards, 4:02)	TIE 14–14
2	10:42	UAPB	Josh Wilkes 5-yard pass from Skyler Perry (Zach Piwniczka PAT blocked) (3 plays, 2 yards, 1:15)	UAPB 20–14
2	08:52	PVAMU	Travis O'Connor 18-yard pass from Trazon Connley (Carlos Villagomez kick) (7 plays, 75 yards, 1:50)	PVAMU 21–20
2	06:36	UAPB	Tyrin Ralph 31-yard pass from Skyler Perry (Zach Piwniczka kick) (6 plays, 60 yards, 2:16)	UAPB 27–21
3	12:37	UAPB	Zach Piwniczka 42-yard field goal (4 plays, 4 yards, 0:41)	UAPB 30–21
3	07:02	PVAMU	Carlos Villagomez 25-yard field goal (6 plays, 38 yards, 2:15)	UAPB 30–24
4	12:14	UAPB	Josh Wilkes 3-yard pass from Skyler Perry (two-point pass conversion attempt failed) (11 plays, 61 yards, 5:11)	UAPB 36–24
4	07:06	PVAMU	Kalen Riles 7-yard pass from Trazon Connley (Carlos Villagomez kick) (9 plays, 75 yards, 3:55)	UAPB 36–31

Statistics	Prairie View A&M	Arkansas–Pine Bluff
First downs	24	18
Total yards	410	346
Rushing yards	70	145
Passing yards	340	201
Turnovers	5	4
Time of possession	29:45	30:15

Team	Category	Player	Statistics
Prairie View A&M	Passing	Trazon Connley	24/49, 341 yards, 3 TDs, 3 INTs
Prairie View A&M	Rushing	Trazon Connley	13 carries, 67 yards
Prairie View A&M	Receiving	Tony Mullins	10 receptions, 114 yards
Arkansas–Pine Bluff	Passing	Skyler Perry	16/33, 201 yards, 4 TDs, 1 INT
Arkansas–Pine Bluff	Rushing	Skyler Perry	12 carries, 45 yards, 1 TD
Arkansas–Pine Bluff	Receiving	Tyrin Ralph	7 receptions, 100 yards, 1 TD
