= Vincent Dancy =

American football coach (born 1984)

Current position
- Title: Defensive ends coach
- Team: Mississippi State
- Conference: SEC

Biographical details
- Born: March 10, 1984 (age 42)
- Education: Jackson State University (2006)

Playing career
- 2002–2005: Jackson State
- Positions: Linebacker, safety

Coaching career (HC unless noted)
- 2009–2011: Jackson State (GA)
- 2012–2013: Jackson State (S)
- 2014: Paine (DC)
- 2015–2017: Mississippi Valley State (DC)
- 2018–2022: Mississippi Valley State
- 2023: Colorado (DQC)
- 2024: Colorado (DE)
- 2025–present: Mississippi State (DE)

Head coaching record
- Overall: 10–38

Vincent Dancy (born March 10, 1984) is an American college football coach. He is the currently the defensive ends coach for Mississippi State University. He was the head football coach for Mississippi Valley State University from 2018 to 2022. He also coached for Jackson State—his alma mater—and Paine.

== Early years ==
Dancy was a standout at Noxubee County High School and played college football at Jackson State, where he was an All-Southwestern Athletic Conference (SWAC) performer.

== Coaching career ==
Dancy was the defensive coordinator for one season at Paine College before joining Rick Comegy's staff at Mississippi Valley State University in 2015.

Dancy was named the interim head coach at Mississippi Valley State on November 20, 2017, when the university announced they would not renew Comegy's contract. On January 2, 2018, the "interim" tag was removed from Dancy's name, and he was named the head football coach at Mississippi Valley State.

== Head coaching record ==
| Year | Team | Overall | Conference | Standing | Bowl/playoffs |
|---|---|---|---|---|---|
Mississippi Valley State (Southwestern Athletic Conference) (2018–2022)
| 2018 | Mississippi Valley State | 1–10 | 1–6 | 5th (East) | |
| 2019 | Mississippi Valley State | 2–9 | 1–6 | 5th (East) | |
| 2020–21 | Mississippi Valley State | 1–3 | 1–3 | 4th (East) | |
| 2021 | Mississippi Valley State | 4–7 | 3–5 | T–4th (East) | |
| 2022 | Mississippi Valley State | 2–9 | 2–6 | T–5th (East) | |
| Mississippi Valley State: | | 10–38 | 8–26 | | |
| Total: | | 10–38 | | | |
