= 2021 SWAC Football Championship Game (May) =

- Conference Championship
Arkansas–Pine Bluff Golden Lions	Alabama A&M Bulldogs
(4–0)	(3–0)
33	40
Head coach: Doc Gamble	Head coach: Connell Maynor
	1	2	3	4	Total
Arkansas–Pine Bluff	14	12	0	7	33
Alabama A&M	10	8	14	8	40
- Date: May 1, 2021
- Season: 2020
- Stadium: Mississippi Veterans Memorial Stadium
- Location: Jackson, Mississippi
- Referee: Marty Adams
- Attendance: 17,248

United States TV coverage
- Network: ESPN2
- Announcers: Tiffany Greene (play by play), Jay Walker (color)

2020 Southwestern Athletic Conference football standings
	Conf.			Overall
Team	W		L	W		L
East Division
No. 24 Alabama A&M x$	3	–	0	5	–	0
Alabama State	3	–	2	3	–	3
Jackson State	3	–	2	4	–	3
Mississippi Valley State	1	–	3	1	–	3
West Division
Arkansas–Pine Bluff x	4	–	0	4	–	1
Southern	4	–	1	5	–	1
Prairie View A&M*	2	–	1	2	–	1
Texas Southern	1	–	2	1	–	2
Grambling State	0	–	4	0	–	4
Championship: Alabama A&M 40, Arkansas–Pine Bluff 33
$ – Conference champion; x – Division champion/co-champions; Note: The SWAC played a spring conference-only schedule (February–May 2021) due to COVID-19 pandemic. Alcorn State opted out of the spring season; all of their scheduled games were counted as forfeit wins for their opponents. * – Ineligible for FCS postseason play due to NCAA sanctions.; Rankings from STATS Poll

The Spring 2021 SWAC Championship Game was a college football game played on Saturday, May 1, 2021, at Mississippi Veterans Memorial Stadium in Jackson, Mississippi. It was the 22nd SWAC Championship Game and determined the 2020 champion of the Southwestern Athletic Conference (SWAC). Sponsored by wireless service provider Cricket, the game was officially known as the Spring 2021 Cricket SWAC Football Championship.

While prior editions of the SWAC Championship Game had been played in December, this edition was delayed into May due to impact of the COVID-19 pandemic on the 2020–21 NCAA Division I FCS football season.

== Teams ==
=== Alabama A&M Bulldogs ===
Alabama A&M entered the championship game 3-0. Alabama A&M had won the championship game once prior in 2006.

=== Arkansas–Pine Bluff ===
Arkansas–Pine Bluff entered the championship game 4-0. Arkansas-Pine Bluff had won the championship game once prior in 2012.

== Game summary ==
Spring 2021 SWAC Championship Game

Quarter	1	2	3	4	Total
UAPB	14	12	0	7	33
Alabama A&M	10	8	14	8	40

at Mississippi Veterans Memorial Stadium, Jackson, MS

- Date: Saturday, May 1, 2021
- Game time: 3 p.m. EST
- Game weather: Partly Cloudy • Temperature: 79 °F (26 °C) • Wind: SE 8 mph
- Game attendance: 17,248
- Referee: Marty Adams
- TV: ESPN2

Game information

First quarter

- (13:29) AAMU – Spencer Corey 29-yard field goal (Drive: 7 plays, 67 yards, 1:31; AAMU 3–0)
- (10:24) UAPB – Mattias Clark 4-yard rush (Zach Piwniczka kick) (Drive: 7 plays, 46 yards, 3:05; UAPB 7–3)
- (7:38) AAMU – Zabrian Moore 30-yard pass from Aqeel Glass (Spencer Corey kick) (Drive: 8 plays, 75 yards, 2:46; AAMU 10–7)
- (7:26) UAPB – Tyrin Ralph 81-yard kickoff returned (Zach Piwniczka kick) (Drive: 0 plays, 0 yards, 0:12; UAPB 14–10)

Second quarter

- (11:07) AAMU – Gary Quarles 3-yard rush (Spencer Corey PAT blocked) (Drive: 9 plays, 43 yards, 3:41; AAMU 16–14)
- (7:04) UAPB – DeJuan Miller 5-yard pass from Taylor Holston (Zach Piwniczka PAT blocked) (Drive: 9 plays, 71 yards, 4:03; UAPB 20–16)
- (7:04) AAMU – Ja'Marian Green Defensive PAT conversion (Drive: 9 plays, 71 yards, 4:03; UAPB 20–18)
- (5:17) UAPB – Kolby Watts 33-yard fumble returned (Drive: 3 plays, 3 yards, 1:47; UAPB 26–18)

Third quarter

- (8:00) AAMU – Anthony Howard 7-yard pass from Aqeel Glass (Spencer Corey kick) (Drive: 12 plays, 79 yards, 4:55; UAPB 26–25)
- (1:24) AAMU – Gary Quarles 3-yard rush (Spencer Corey kick) (Drive: 8 plays, 80 yards, 3:15; AAMU 32–26)

Fourth quarter

- (7:16) AAMU – Zabrian Moore 13-yard pass from Aqeel Glass (Aqeel Glass two-point conversion pass to Terrell Gardner) (Drive: 7 plays, 56 yards, 2:40; AAMU 40–26)
- (2:30) UAPB - Josh Wilkes 11-yard pass from Skylar Perry (Zach Piwniczka kick) (AAMU 40–33)
