= Michael Jefferson (American football) =

American football player (born 1999)

Profile
- Position: Wide receiver

Personal information
- Born: December 21, 1999 (age 26); Mobile, Alabama, U.S.
- Listed height: 6 ft 4 in (1.93 m)
- Listed weight: 205 lb (93 kg)

Career information
- High school: Murphy (AL)
- College: Alabama State (2018–2020); Louisiana (2021–2022)
- NFL draft: 2023: undrafted

Awards and highlights
- Third-team All-Sun Belt (2022)

Michael Jefferson (born December 21, 1999) is an American football wide receiver. He played college football at Alabama State and Louisiana.

== Early life ==
Jefferson was born in Mobile, Alabama, on December 21, 1999. He attended Murphy High School and posted 35 receptions for 628 yards and ten touchdowns as a senior, and overall recorded 52 catches for 968 yards and 14 scores at the school. He did not receive a star rating from the major recruiting services, but committed to play college football for the FCS Alabama State Hornets, among the only teams to give him an offer.

== College career ==
As a true freshman at Alabama State in 2018, Jefferson posted 12 receptions for 115 yards and four touchdowns, leading the team in the latter category. The following year, he posted 49 receptions for 767 yards and 12 touchdowns; his touchdown total tied a team record. In the COVID-19-shortened 2020 season, Jefferson tallied a team-leading 24 catches for 234 yards and two touchdowns. After the year, he transferred to Louisiana.

In his first year at Louisiana, Jefferson recorded a team-leading 481 receiving yards despite only placing sixth on the team with 18 catches, scoring four touchdowns on the season and being named honorable mention all-conference. In the 2022 season, he posted 51 catches for 810 yards and seven scores.

== Professional career ==
Pre-draft measurables
Height	Weight	Arm length	Hand span	40-yard dash	10-yard split	20-yard split	20-yard shuttle	Three-cone drill	Vertical jump	Broad jump	Bench press
6 ft 3 3/4 in (1.92 m)	199 lb (90 kg)	32 1/2 in (0.83 m)	9 5/8 in (0.24 m)	4.56 s	1.52 s	2.60 s	4.43 s	6.94 s	37.0 in (0.94 m)	11 ft 1 in (3.38 m)	16 reps

Jefferson had been projected as a potential middle-round selection in the 2023 NFL draft. On April 11, 2023, he was severely injured in a car crash that killed another driver and needed multiple surgeries. He was released from the hospital on April 19 and is slated to miss the entire season as a result of the crash.

On September 14, 2023, the San Francisco 49ers hosted Jefferson for a workout. The next day, Jefferson was hosted for a visit with the Seattle Seahawks.
