= ASU Stadium (Alabama) =

Football stadium in Montgomery, Alabama, US

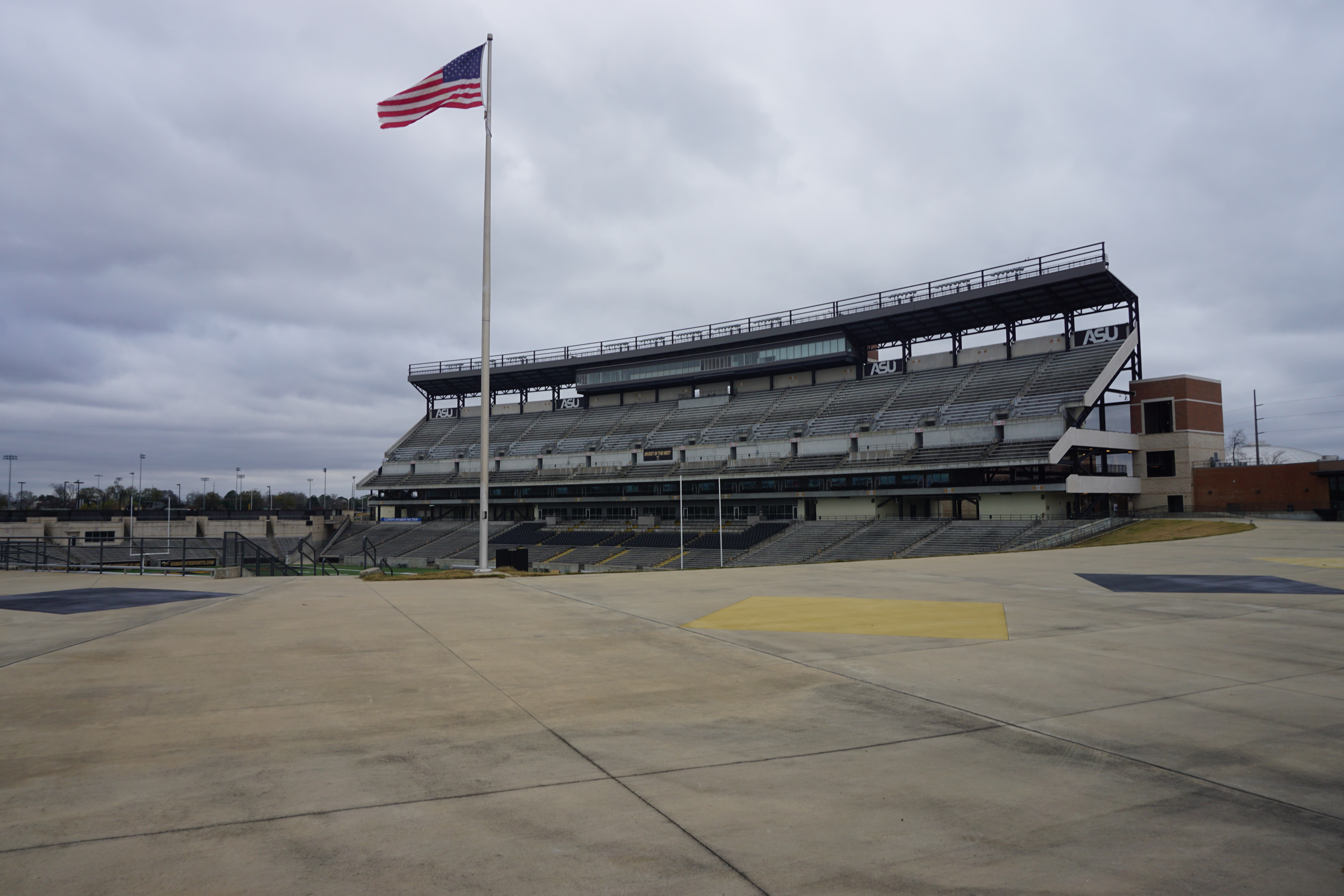
- ASU Stadium
- Interactive map of ASU Stadium
- Location: Montgomery, Alabama
- Coordinates: 32°21′50″N 86°17′26″W
- Owner: Alabama State University
- Operator: Alabama State University
- Capacity: 26,500
- Surface: AstroTurf

Construction
- Groundbreaking: February 4, 2011
- Opened: November 22, 2012
- Cost: $62 million
- Architects: Brown Chambless Architects; Convergence Design
- Project manager: TCU Consulting Services
- Structural engineer: Blackburn Daniels O'Barr
- Services engineers: CRS Engineering, Inc.
- General contractors: Rabren General Contractors, Inc.

Tenant
- Alabama State Hornets (NCAA) 2012–present

ASU Stadium is an American football stadium in Montgomery, Alabama, on the campus of Alabama State University that serves as the home field for the Alabama State Hornets football team. The stadium opened in 2012 and replaced the Cramton Bowl as the home of ASU football. ASU Stadium's inaugural game was played November 22, 2012, when it hosted the 89th Turkey Day Classic in which the Hornets hosted the Tuskegee Golden Tigers. The game, won by Tuskegee 27–25, was a sell-out and was televised nationally on ESPNU.

The stadium's current capacity sits at 26,500 but the facility is designed to allow for future expansion that can increase the capacity to 55,000.

== Other uses ==
The stadium also holds a restaurant and retail space which allows other uses throughout the year. The stadium itself hosts other events such as band competitions.

== Attendance records ==
Rank	Attendance	Date	Game Result
1	28,332	October 8, 2022	Alabama State 12, Jackson State 26
2	27,828	September 7, 2019	Alabama State 38, Tuskegee 31
3	27,500	November 22, 2012	Alabama State 25, Tuskegee 27
4	26,222	September 1, 2018	Alabama State 26, Tuskegee 20^{OT}
5	25,442	September 2, 2017	Alabama State 6, Tuskegee 14
6	23,687	November 12, 2022	Alabama State 14, Florida A&M 21
7	22,911	November 24, 2023	Alabama State 41, Tuskegee 3
8	20,726	September 2, 2023	Alabama State 14, Southern 10
9	20,703	August 31, 2013	Alabama State 22, Jacksonville State 24
10	18,972	November 24, 2016	Alabama State 53, Miles 20

== See also ==
- List of NCAA Division I FCS football stadiums
