= 2022 Celebration Bowl =

Postseason college football bowl game

2022 Cricket Celebration Bowl
- 7th Celebration Bowl
Jackson State Tigers	North Carolina Central Eagles
(12–0)	(9–2)
SWAC	MEAC
34	41
Head coach: Deion Sanders	Head coach: Trei Oliver
Coaches / STATS; 5 / 10	Coaches / STATS; 21 / NR
	1	2	3	4	OT	Total
Jackson State	7	14	0	13	0	34
North Carolina Central	10	7	9	8	7	41
- Date: December 17, 2022
- Season: 2022
- Stadium: Mercedes-Benz Stadium
- Location: Atlanta, Georgia
- MVP: Davius Richard (QB, NC Central) & Khalil Baker (DB, NC Central)
- Favorite: Jackson State by 14
- Referee: Billy Williams (MAC)
- Attendance: 49,670

United States TV coverage
- Network: ABC
- Announcers: Tiffany Greene (play-by-play), Jay Walker (analyst), and Tiffany Blackmon (sideline)

International TV coverage
- Network: ESPN Deportes and ESPN Brazil
- Announcers: ESPN Brazil: Thiago Alves (play-by-play) and Deivis Chiodini (analyst)

The 2022 Celebration Bowl was a college football bowl game played on December 17, 2022, at Mercedes-Benz Stadium in Atlanta, Georgia. The seventh annual Celebration Bowl, the game featured the Jackson State Tigers, champions of the Southwestern Athletic Conference (SWAC) and the North Carolina Central Eagles, champions of the Mid-Eastern Athletic Conference (MEAC). The SWAC and MEAC are the two prominent NCAA Division I conferences of historically black colleges and universities (HBCUs).

The game began at 12:07 p.m. EST and aired on ABC. It was the only Football Championship Subdivision (FCS) contest of the 2022–23 bowl games. Sponsored by wireless service provider Cricket Wireless, it was officially known as the Cricket Celebration Bowl.

== Teams ==
The Celebration Bowl featured the Jackson State Tigers, champions of the Southwestern Athletic Conference and North Carolina Central Eagles, champions of the Mid-Eastern Athletic Conference (MEAC). This was North Carolina Central's second Celebration Bowl appearance following their one-point loss to Grambling State in 2016. The Celebration Bowl is viewed by some as the de facto black college football national championship game, though not unanimously; North Carolina Central claims one black college football national championship: in 2006, as a member of the Central Intercollegiate Athletic Association. Jackson State claims four, most recently in 2021 despite their loss in the Celebration Bowl to South Carolina State, which was also their only previous Celebration Bowl appearance.

This was the fourth meeting between Jackson State and North Carolina Central; Jackson State entered leading the series 3–0. The teams had last played in 1987, when the Tigers defeated the Eagles 10–9.

=== Jackson State ===
In their third season under head coach Deion Sanders, the Jackson State Tigers began the year with a dominant win over Florida A&M in the Orange Blossom Classic, played at Hard Rock Stadium. Their second game was also a neutral site contest, as they defeated Tennessee State in the Southern Heritage Classic by thirteen points. The Tigers played their home opener the following week, against Grambling State, and defeated Mississippi Valley State at home to lead into a bye week. Now ranked in the top 10 by the STATS FCS Poll, the Tigers continued their good form in a pair of road contests, first defeating Alabama State by fourteen points and then beating Bethune–Cookman by forty. Jackson State's homecoming game followed, as the Tigers hosted the Campbell Fighting Camels from the Big South Conference, and won by eight. The following weekend, on October 29, Jackson State played host to College GameDay for the first time as the Tigers defeated Southern in a shutout, 35–0. That game was their final home contest of the season, as the followed it up with a road win at Texas Southern, a neutral-site contest in Mobile, Alabama, against Alabama A&M, and another road win over Alcorn State to cap their undefeated regular season. This undefeated season also guaranteed them a bid to the SWAC Football Championship Game, where they defeated Southern for a second time to win their second consecutive SWAC championship. The Tigers entered the game with a 12–0 record, and an 8–0 mark in conference play, and ranked No. 10 by the STATS Poll and No. 5 by the Coaches' Poll.

On December 3, 2022, following the conclusion of the SWAC championship game, it was announced that Sanders would accept the head coaching position at Colorado. He arrived in Boulder to take the job the following day, but clarified that he would remain with Jackson State through the end of the season, making the Celebration Bowl his last game at Jackson State.

=== North Carolina Central ===
In their third season under head coach Trei Oliver, the North Carolina Central (NCCU) Eagles began their 2022 campaign with a neutral site rivalry game against North Carolina A&T, which they won, marking their first win over the Aggies since 2016. NCCU's home opener played to a shutout victory over Winston-Salem State, an NCAA Division II school which is also an HBCU. NCCU pulled an upset the next week, defeating No. 25 New Hampshire on the road and taking their spot at No. 25 in the rankings the following week. After a sound defeat of Virginia–Lynchburg the following week, NCCU suffered their first defeat of the season at Campbell in their fifth game. Following a bye week, they opened conference play with a 39-point defeat of Morgan State, but were defeated on the road the following week by defending Celebration Bowl champions South Carolina State. NCCU returned to winning ways with a victory over Delaware State, and won their homecoming game against Howard. The Eagles clinched the MEAC Championship and their bid to the Celebration Bowl on November 12, 2022, after defeating Norfolk State, 48–14. They finished their regular season on with an away victory against Tennessee Tech by virtue of a field goal as time expired. NCCU entered the game with an overall record of 9–2 and a MEAC record of 4–1. They were ranked No. 21 in the Coaches' Poll but were unranked in the STATS Poll prior to the game.

== Game summary ==
The Celebration Bowl was televised by ESPN, with a commentary team of Tiffany Greene, Jay Walker, and Tiffany Blackmon. The ESPN Radio broadcast of the game featured commentators Anish Shroff, Max Starks, and Harry Lyles Jr. The game was officiated by a Mid-American Conference crew led by referee Billy Williams and umpire Tony Day. The game was played indoors at Mercedes-Benz Stadium in Atlanta, Georgia.

=== Scoring summary ===
2022 Cricket Celebration Bowl

Quarter	1	2	3	4	OT	Total
No. 10 Jackson State	7	14	0	13	0	34
North Carolina Central	10	7	9	8	7	41

at Mercedes-Benz Stadium • Atlanta, Georgia

- Date: Saturday, December 17, 2022
- Game time: 12:00 p.m. EST
- Game weather: n/a (game played indoors)
- Game attendance: 49,670
- Referee: Billy Williams
- TV announcers (ABC): Tiffany Greene (play-by-play), Jay Walker (analyst), and Tiffany Blackmon (sideline)
- Box score

Scoring summary

Quarter	Time	Drive			Team	Scoring information	Score	
Quarter	Time	Plays	Yards	TOP	Team	Scoring information	Jackson State	North Carolina Central
1	11:37	7	60	3:23	NC Central	32-yard field goal by Adrian Olivo	0	3
1	7:27	4	67	2:12	NC Central	Davius Richard 4-yard touchdown run, Adrian Olivo kick good	0	10
1	6:28	4	64	0:52	Jackson State	D.J. Stevens 24-yard touchdown reception from Shedeur Sanders, Alejandro Mata kick good	7	10
2	10:41	3	96	1:08	Jackson State	Kevin Coleman Jr. 85-yard touchdown reception from Shedeur Sanders, Alejandro Mata kick good	14	10
2	3:51	11	75	6:50	NC Central	J'Mari Taylor 10-yard touchdown run, Adrian Olivo kick good	14	17
2	0:30	9	85	3:11	Jackson State	Shedeur Sanders 7-yard touchdown run, Alejandro Mata kick good	21	17
3	5:45	12	87	7:21	NC Central	Quentin McCall 12-yard touchdown reception from Davius Richard, Adrian Olivo kick failed (wide right)	21	23
3	0:23	6	61	3:44	NC Central	21-yard field goal by Adrian Olivo	21	26
4	11:25	10	55	3:51	Jackson State	Travis Hunter 18-yard touchdown reception from Shedeur Sanders, 2-point pass failed	27	26
4	4:31	11	73	6:48	NC Central	Latrell Collier 7-yard touchdown run, 2-point pass good	27	34
4	0:00	15	81	4:31	Jackson State	Travis Hunter 19-yard touchdown reception from Shedeur Sanders, Alejandro Mata kick good	34	34
OT		4	25		NC Central	Davius Richard 1-yard touchdown run, Adrian Olivo kick good	34	41
"TOP" = time of possession. For other American football terms, see Glossary of American football.							34	41

== Statistics ==
Team statistical comparison
Statistic	Jackson State	North Carolina Central
First downs	23	23
First downs rushing	5	13
First downs passing	16	8
First downs penalty	2	2
Third down efficiency	5–12	4–11
Fourth down efficiency	2–3	2–2
Total plays–net yards	66–417	65–482
Rushing attempts–net yards	24–78	44–276
Yards per rush	3.3	6.3
Yards passing	349	208
Pass completions–attempts	30–41	16–21
Interceptions thrown	0	0
Punt returns–total yards	0–0	2–3
Kickoff returns–total yards	7–135	1–25
Punts–average yardage	4–40.5	3–38.3
Fumbles–lost	2–1	1–0
Penalties–yards	6–45	8–70
Time of possession	21:51	38:09

Jackson State statistics
Tigers passing
	C–A	Yds	TD–INT
Shedeur Sanders	27–35	329	4–0
TEAM	0–1	0	0–0
Tigers rushing
	Car	Yds	TD
Sy'veon Wilkerson	13	48	0
JD Martin	1	17	0
Shedeur Sanders	9	−1	1
Tigers receiving
	Rec	Yds	TD
Kevin Coleman Jr.	7	137	1
Shane Hooks	7	70	0
Travis Hunter	4	47	2
DJ Stevens	2	34	1
Dallas Daniels	2	20	0
JD Martin	1	10	0
Rico Powers	1	9	0
Sy'veon Wilkerson	1	3	0
Santee Marshall	2	−1	0

North Carolina Central statistics
Eagles passing
	C–A	Yds	TD–INT
Davius Richard	15–20	175	1–0
E.J. Hicks	1–1	31	0–0
Eagles rushing
	Car	Yds	TD
Davius Richard	20	94	1
Latrell Collier	17	79	1
Kyle Morgan	1	43	0
J'Mari Taylor	4	38	1
Eagles receiving
	Rec	Yds	TD
E.J. Hicks	3	84	0
Latrell Collier	5	40	0
Davius Richard	1	31	0
Quentin McCall	3	26	1
Devin Smith	3	13	0
Twan Flip Jr.	1	12	0

== See also ==
- 2022 Peach Bowl, contested at the same venue on December 31
