= 2022 SWAC Football Championship Game =

College football game

- Conference Championship
Southern Jaguars	Jackson State Tigers
(7–4)	(11–0)
24	43
Head coach: Eric Dooley	Head coach: Deion Sanders
	STATS 10
	1	2	3	4	Total
Southern	0	10	14	0	24
Jackson State	26	7	10	0	43
- Date: December 3, 2022
- Season: 2022
- Stadium: Mississippi Veterans Memorial Stadium
- Location: Jackson, Mississippi
- Favorite: Jackson by 17.5

United States TV coverage
- Network: ESPN2
- Announcers: Tiffany Greene, Jay Walker and Jalyn Johnson

2022 Southwestern Athletic Conference football standings
	Conf.			Overall
Team	W		L	W		L
East Division
No. 16 Jackson State xy$	8	–	0	12	–	1
Florida A&M	7	–	1	9	–	2
Alabama State	4	–	4	6	–	5
Alabama A&M	4	–	4	4	–	7
Bethune–Cookman	2	–	6	2	–	9
Mississippi Valley State	2	–	6	2	–	9
West Division
Southern xy	5	–	3	7	–	5
Prairie View A&M x	5	–	3	6	–	5
Alcorn State	4	–	4	5	–	6
Texas Southern	4	–	4	5	–	6
Grambling State	2	–	6	3	–	8
Arkansas–Pine Bluff	1	–	7	3	–	8
Championship: Jackson State 43, Southern 24
$ – Conference champion; x – Division champion/co-champions; y – Championship game participant; Rankings from STATS Poll

The 2022 SWAC Championship Game was a college football game played on December 3, 2022, at Mississippi Veterans Memorial Stadium in Jackson, Mississippi. It was the 24th edition of the SWAC Championship Game and determined the champion of the Southwestern Athletic Conference (SWAC) for the 2022 season. The game began at 3:00 p.m. CST on ESPN2. The game featured the Jackson State Tigers, the East Division champions, and the Southern Jaguars, the West Division champions. Sponsored by wireless service provider Cricket and by beverage corporation PepsiCo, the game was officially known as the 2022 Cricket SWAC Football Championship presented by Pepsi. The winner of the game received a bid to the Celebration Bowl to face the champions of the Mid-Eastern Athletic Conference (MEAC), the North Carolina Central Eagles.

== Teams ==
=== Jackson State ===
Jackson State clinched a spot in the game following its defeat of Alabama A&M on November 12. The win also ensured they would host the game.

=== Southern ===
Southern clinched a spot by defeating Grambing State in the Bayou Classic on November 26.
