= Bubba McDowell =

American football player and coach (born 1966)

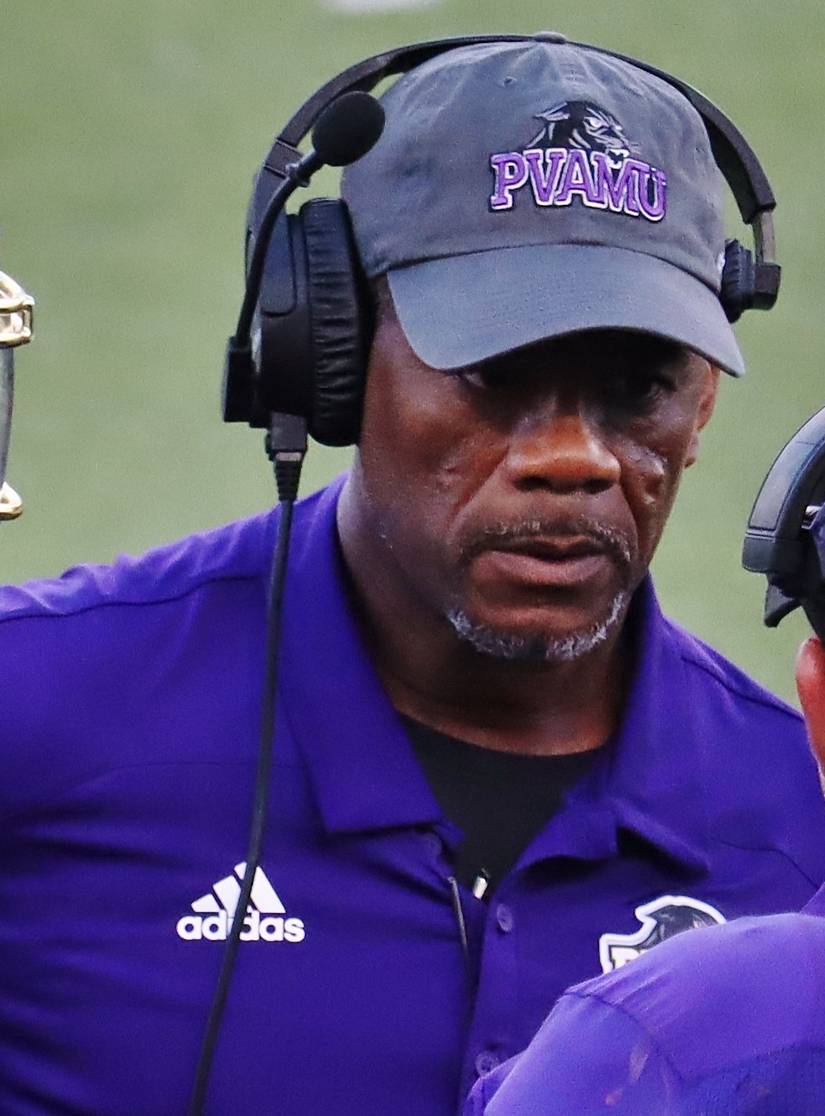
- McDowell with Prairie View A&M in 2022

Personal information
- Born: November 4, 1966 (age 60); Fort Gaines, Georgia, U.S.
- Listed height: 6 ft 1 in (1.85 m)
- Listed weight: 206 lb (93 kg)

Career information
- High school: Merritt Island (Merritt Island, Florida)
- College: Miami (FL)
- NFL draft: 1989: 3rd round, 77th overall pick

Career history

Playing
- Houston Oilers (1989–1994); Carolina Panthers (1995)

Coaching
- Prairie View A&M (2012–2018) Defensive backs coach; Prairie View A&M (2019–2021) Assistant head coach; Prairie View A&M (2022–2024) Head coach

Awards and highlights
- As player: Second-team All-Pro (1991); First Team All-South Independent (1988); National champion (1987); As head coach: 2 SWAC West Division (2022, 2023)

Career NFL statistics
- Total tackles: 486
- Sacks: 5
- Interceptions: 17
- Forced fumbles: 10
- Fumble recoveries: 6
- Stats at Pro Football Reference

Leonard "Bubba" McDowell (born November 4, 1966) is an American football coach and former player. He played professionally as a safety for seven seasons in the National Football League (NFL) with the Houston Oilers and Carolina Panthers. McDowell played college football at the University of Miami. McDowell was drafted by the Oilers in the third round of the 1989 NFL draft.

== Coaching career ==
After the departure of Eric Dooley, McDowell was named the head coach of the Prairie View A&M Panthers football team on January 4, 2022. On November 24, 2024, university athletic director Anton Goff announced that McDowell's contract would not be renewed.

== Head coaching record ==
Year	Team	Overall	Conference	Standing	Bowl/playoffs
Prairie View A&M Panthers (Southwestern Athletic Conference) (2022–2024)
2022	Prairie View A&M	6–5	5–3	T–1st (West)	
2023	Prairie View A&M	6–6	6–2	T–1st (West)	
2024	Prairie View A&M	5–7	3–5	4th (West)	
Prairie View A&M:		17–18	14–10		
Total:		17–18			
National championship Conference title Conference division title or championship game berth
