= 2022 Alcorn State Braves football team =

American college football season

2022 Alcorn State Braves football
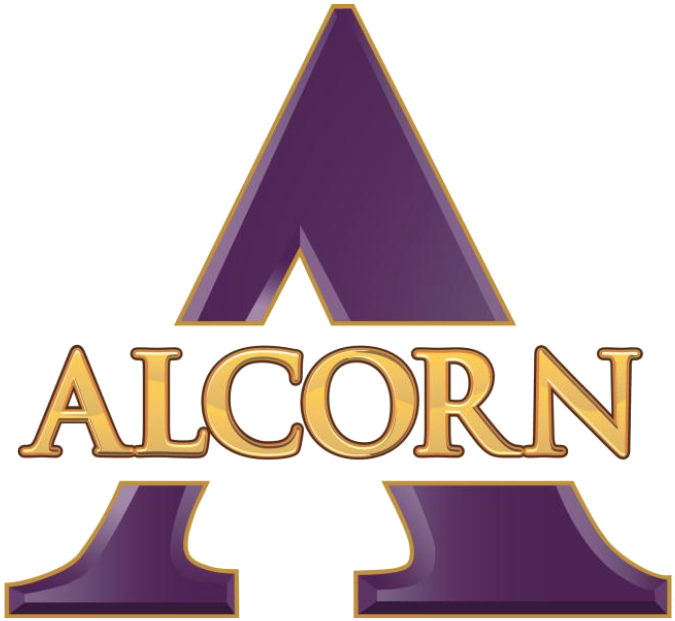
- Conference: Southwestern Athletic Conference
- West Division
- Record: 5–6 (4–4 SWAC)
- Head coach: Fred McNair (6th season)
- Offensive coordinator: Elliott Wratten (3rd season)
- Defensive coordinator: Cedric Thomas (1st season)
- Home stadium: Casem-Spinks Stadium

2022 Southwestern Athletic Conference football standings
	Conf.			Overall
Team	W		L	W		L
East Division
No. 16 Jackson State xy$	8	–	0	12	–	1
Florida A&M	7	–	1	9	–	2
Alabama State	4	–	4	6	–	5
Alabama A&M	4	–	4	4	–	7
Bethune–Cookman	2	–	6	2	–	9
Mississippi Valley State	2	–	6	2	–	9
West Division
Southern xy	5	–	3	7	–	5
Prairie View A&M x	5	–	3	6	–	5
Alcorn State	4	–	4	5	–	6
Texas Southern	4	–	4	5	–	6
Grambling State	2	–	6	3	–	8
Arkansas–Pine Bluff	1	–	7	3	–	8
Championship: Jackson State 43, Southern 24
$ – Conference champion; x – Division champion/co-champions; y – Championship game participant; Rankings from STATS Poll

The 2022 Alcorn State Braves football team represented Alcorn State University as a member of the Southwestern Athletic Conference (SWAC) during the 2022 NCAA Division I FCS football season. They were led by head coach Fred McNair, who was coaching his sixth season with the program. The Braves played their home games at Casem-Spinks Stadium in Lorman, Mississippi.

== Schedule ==
Alcorn State finalized their 2022 schedule on March 22, 2022.

Date	Time	Opponent	Site	TV	Result	Attendance
September 3	6:00 p.m.	No. 10 Stephen F. Austin*	Casem-Spinks Stadium; Lorman, MS		L 27–31	6,872
September 10	6:00 p.m.	at Tulane*	Yulman Stadium; New Orleans, LA	ESPN+	L 0–52	14,501
September 17	7:00 p.m.	at McNeese State*	Cowboy Stadium; Lake Charles, LA		W 30–19	11,425
September 24	6:00 p.m.	Arkansas–Pine Bluff	Casem-Spinks Stadium; Lorman, MS	HBCU Go	W 38–21	15,671
October 8	6:00 p.m.	at Mississippi Valley State	Rice–Totten Stadium; Itta Bena, MS	YouTube	W 30–7	6,700
October 15	6:00 p.m.	at Southern	A. W. Mumford Stadium; Baton Rouge, LA	ESPN+	L 17–21	26,900
October 22	2:00 p.m.	Texas Southern	Casem-Spinks Stadium; Lorman, MS	ESPN+	L 27–34	20,645
October 29	2:00 p.m.	at Grambling State	Eddie Robinson Stadium; Grambling, LA	ESPN+	L 6–35	
November 5	2:00 p.m.	at Prairie View A&M	Panther Stadium at Blackshear Field; Prairie View, TX	ESPNU	W 23–16 ^{OT}	6,562
November 12	2:00 p.m.	Bethune–Cookman	Casem-Spinks Stadium; Lorman, MS	HBCU Go	W 17–14	
November 19	2:00 p.m.	No. 10 Jackson State	Casem-Spinks Stadium; Lorman, MS (Soul Bowl)	ESPN+	L 13–24	31,017
*Non-conference game; Rankings from STATS Poll released prior to the game; All times are in Central time

== Game summaries ==
=== No. 10 Stephen F. Austin ===
	1	2	3	4	Total
Lumberjacks	3	7	14	7	31
Braves	7	17	0	3	27

=== at Tulane ===
Alcorn State Braves (0–1) vs Tulane Green Wave (1–0) – Game summary

Quarter	1	2	3	4	Total
Braves	0	0	0	0	0
Green Wave	17	14	14	7	52

at Yulman Stadium • New Orleans, LA

- Date: September 10, 2022
- Game time: 6:00 p.m.
- Game weather: Partly cloudy, 73 °F (23 °C)
- Game attendance: 14,501
- Referee: Nate Black
- TV announcers (ESPN+): Jack Benjamin (play-by-play), Brian Kinchen (analyst)

Game information

First quarter

- (7:59) TUL – Kriston Esnard 26-yard field goal (Drive: 12 plays, 64 yards, 5:15; Tulane 3–0)
- (6:18) TUL – Shaadie Clayton-Johnson 6-yard run, Kriston Esnard kick (Drive: 3 plays, 27 yards, 1:11; Tulane 10–0)
- (3:10) TUL – Lawrence Keys III 7-yard run, Kriston Esnard kick (Drive: 3 plays, 52 yards, 1:02; Tulane 17–0)

Second quarter

- (13:38) TUL – Jha'Quan Jackson 16-yard pass from Michael Pratt, Kriston Esnard kick (Drive: 5 plays, 49 yards, 2:26; Tulane 24–0)
- (2:46) TUL – Tyrick James 25-yard pass from Michael Pratt, Kriston Esnard kick (Drive: 8 plays, 77 yards, 3:20; Tulane 31–0)

Third quarter

- (13:13) TUL – Shae Wyatt 72-yard pass from Michael Pratt, Kriston Esnard kick (Drive: 1 play, 72 yards, 0:00; Tulane 38–0)
- (8:58) TUL – Dea Dea McDougle 16-yard run, Kriston Esnard kick (Drive: 4 plays, 33 yards, 1:52; Tulane 45–0)

Fourth quarter

- (8:08) TUL – Justin Ibieta 3-yard run, Graham Dable kick (Drive: 13 plays, 86 yards, 5:48; Tulane 52–0)

Statistics	ALCN	TUL
First downs	4	30
Total yards	109	558
Rushes/yards	32–60	44–159
Passing yards	49	399
Passing: Comp–Att–Int	5–14–1	25–31–0
Time of possession	24:49	35:11

Team	Category	Player	Statistics
Alcorn State	Passing	Markevion Quinn	2/4, 34 yards
Alcorn State	Rushing	Javonta Leatherwood	8 carries, 30 yards
Alcorn State	Receiving	C. J. Bolar	1 reception, 19 yards
Tulane	Passing	Michael Pratt	17/21, 318 yards, 3 TD
Tulane	Rushing	Iverson Celestine	11 carries, 43 yards
Tulane	Receiving	Shae Wyatt	5 receptions, 130 yards, TD

=== at McNeese ===
Alcorn State Braves (0–2) vs. McNeese State Cowboys (0–2)

Quarter	1	2	3	4	Total
Braves	0	21	3	6	30
Cowboys	0	3	14	2	19

at Cowboy Stadium • Lake Charles, LA

- Date: September 17th
- Game time: 7:00 P.M CST
- Game attendance: 18,629
- Referee: Ed Ardito
- TV: ESPN3

=== Arkansas–Pine Bluff ===
	1	2	3	4	Total
Golden Lions	7	7	7	0	21
Braves	7	3	14	14	38

=== at Mississippi Valley State ===
	1	2	3	4	Total
Braves	7	7	0	16	30
Delta Devils	0	7	0	0	7

=== at Southern ===
	1	2	3	4	Total
Braves	0	14	0	3	17
Jaguars	7	14	0	0	21

=== Texas Southern ===
	1	2	3	4	Total
Tigers	7	7	10	10	34
Braves	6	7	7	7	27

=== at Grambling State ===
	1	2	3	4	Total
Braves	0	0	6	0	6
Tigers	14	14	0	7	35

=== at Prairie View A&M ===
	1	2	3	4	OT	Total
Braves	3	6	0	7	7	23
Panthers	0	0	13	3	0	16

=== Bethune–Cookman ===
	1	2	3	4	Total
Wildcats	0	0	7	7	14
Braves	0	10	0	7	17

=== No. 10 Jackson State ===
	1	2	3	4	Total
No. 10 JSU Tigers	3	14	0	7	24
Braves	0	7	3	3	13

Statistics	JKST	ALCN
First downs	15	15
Total yards	258	251
Rushing yards	42	68
Passing yards	216	183
Turnovers	2	2
Time of possession	30:12	29:48

Team	Category	Player	Statistics
Jackson State	Passing	Shedeur Sanders	18/29, 216 yards, TD, INT
Jackson State	Rushing	Sy'veon Wilkerson	21 carries, 63 yards, TD
Jackson State	Receiving	Travis Hunter	2 receptions, 49 yards, TD
Alcorn State	Passing	Tre Lawrence	8/23, 153 yards, INT
Alcorn State	Rushing	Jarveon Howard	28 carries, 96 yards, TD
Alcorn State	Receiving	Monterio Hunt	4 receptions, 109 yards
