= 2022 Arkansas–Pine Bluff Golden Lions football team =

American college football season

2022 Arkansas–Pine Bluff Golden Lions football
- Conference: Southwestern Athletic Conference
- West Division
- Record: 3–8 (1–7 SWAC)
- Head coach: Doc Gamble (3rd season; first 7 games); Don Treadwell (interim, final 4 games)
- Offensive coordinator: Don Treadwell (2nd season)
- Defensive coordinator: Jonathan Bradley (4th season)
- Home stadium: Simmons Bank Field

2022 Southwestern Athletic Conference football standings
| | Conf. | | | Overall |
| Team | W | | L | W | | L |
|---|---|---|---|---|---|---|
East Division
| No. 16 Jackson State xy$ | 8 | – | 0 | 12 | – | 1 |
| Florida A&M | 7 | – | 1 | 9 | – | 2 |
| Alabama State | 4 | – | 4 | 6 | – | 5 |
| Alabama A&M | 4 | – | 4 | 4 | – | 7 |
| Bethune–Cookman | 2 | – | 6 | 2 | – | 9 |
| Mississippi Valley State | 2 | – | 6 | 2 | – | 9 |
West Division
| Southern xy | 5 | – | 3 | 7 | – | 5 |
| Prairie View A&M x | 5 | – | 3 | 6 | – | 5 |
| Alcorn State | 4 | – | 4 | 5 | – | 6 |
| Texas Southern | 4 | – | 4 | 5 | – | 6 |
| Grambling State | 2 | – | 6 | 3 | – | 8 |
| Arkansas–Pine Bluff | 1 | – | 7 | 3 | – | 8 |
Championship: Jackson State 43, Southern 24
$ – Conference champion; x – Division champion/co-champions; y – Championship game participant; Rankings from STATS Poll

The 2022 Arkansas–Pine Bluff Golden Lions football team represented University of Arkansas at Pine Bluff as a member of the Southwestern Athletic Conference (SWAC) during the 2022 NCAA Division I FCS football season. They were led through the first seven games of the season by head coach Doc Gamble, who was in his third season with the program, until he was fired on October 20, with offensive coordinator Don Treadwell assuming interim head coaching duties for the remainder of the season. The Lions played their home games at Simmons Bank Field in Pine Bluff, Arkansas.

== Schedule ==
Arkansas–Pine Bluff finalized their 2022 schedule on March 16, 2022.

| Date | Time | Opponent | Site | TV | Result | Attendance |
|---|---|---|---|---|---|---|
| September 3 | 6:00 p.m. | Lane* | Simmons Bank Field; Pine Bluff, AR | Golden Lions All-Access | W 48–42 | 6,238 |
| September 10 | 6:00 p.m. | North American* | Simmons Bank Field; Pine Bluff, AR | Golden Lions All-Access | W 76–3 | 6,237 |
| September 17 | 6:00 p.m. | at No. 8 (FBS) Oklahoma State* | Boone Pickens Stadium; Stillwater, OK | ESPN+ | L 7–63 | 55,509 |
| September 24 | 6:00 p.m. | at Alcorn State | Casem-Spinks Stadium; Lorman, MS | HBCU Go | L 21–38 | 15,671 |
| October 1 | 6:00 p.m. | at Southern | A. W. Mumford Stadium; Baton Rouge, LA | ESPN+ | L 3–59 | 15,792 |
| October 8 | 2:00 p.m. | Texas Southern^{†} | Simmons Bank Field; Pine Bluff, AR | Golden Lions All-Access | L 17–24 | 13,249 |
| October 16 | 3:00 p.m. | Alabama A&M | Simmons Bank Field; Pine Bluff, AR (Note: The game against Alabama A&M was originally scheduled to be played as part of the St. Louis River City HBCU Football Classic at The Dome at America's Center in St. Louis, but the classic was cancelled and the game was moved to Pine Bluff on October 12.) | | L 31–34 | 4,172 |
| October 29 | 3:00 p.m. | at Florida A&M | Bragg Memorial Stadium; Tallahassee, FL | HBCU Go | L 6-27 | 19,802 |
| November 5 | 2:00 p.m. | at Grambling State | Eddie Robinson Stadium; Grambling, LA | ESPN+ | L 10–36 | 13,589 |
| November 12 | 2:00 p.m. | Prairie View A&M | Simmons Bank Field; Pine Bluff, AR | Golden Lions All-Access | L 24–55 | 3,148 |
| November 24 | 2:00 p.m. | at Alabama State | New ASU Stadium; Montgomery, AL | ESPN+ | W 19–14 | 1,400 |
*Non-conference game; ^{†}Homecoming; Rankings from STATS Poll released prior to the game; All times are in Central time

== Game summaries ==
=== at No. 8 (FBS) Oklahoma State ===
Arkansas–Pine Bluff Golden Lions (2–0) vs. No. 8 Oklahoma State Cowboys (2–0)

| Quarter | 1 | 2 | 3 | 4 | Total |
|---|---|---|---|---|---|
| Arkansas-Pine Bluff | 0 | 7 | 0 | 0 | 7 |
| No. 8 (FBS) Oklahoma State | 28 | 21 | 7 | 7 | 63 |

at Boone Pickens Stadium • Stillwater, OK

- Date: Saturday, September 17, 2022
- Game time: 6:00 p.m. CDT
- Game weather: • Sunny Temperature: 91
- Game attendance: 55,509
- Referee: Scott Campbell
- TV announcers (ESPN+): Pete Sousa (play-by-play) & Chad Brown (analyst)

Game information

First Quarter

- (14:22) OSU – Spencer Sanders 24 yard pass to Braydon Johnson, Tanner Brown kick (Drive: 2 plays, 75 yards, 0:38; OSU 7–0)
- (12:24) OSU – Trace Ford 15 yard punt, Tanner Brown kick (OSU 14–0)
- (1:50) OSU – Spencer Sanders 10 yard pass to John Paul Richardson, Tanner Brown kick (Drive: 10 plays, 87 yards, 2:51; OSU 21–0)
- (1:10) OSU – Spencer Sanders 42 yard pass to Braydon Johnson, Tanner Brown kick (Drive: 1 play, 42 yards, 0:08; OSU 28–0)

Second Quarter

- (14:18) OSU – Spencer Sanders 23 yard pass to Brennan Presley, Tanner Brown kick (Drive: 5 plays, 38 yards, 1:51; OSU 35–0)
- (10:50) OSU – Korie Black 37 yard FG return run, Tanner Brown kick (OSU 42–0)
- (5:24) APB – Skyler Perry 15 yard pass to Raequan Prince, Cristofer Thompson kick (Drive: 3 plays, 23 yards, 1:04; OSU 42–7)
- (1:23) OSU – Gunnar Gundy 16 yard pass to Talyn Shettron, Tanner Brown kick (Drive: 11 plays, 70 yards, 3:54; OSU 49–7)

Third Quarter

- (9:00) OSU – Gunnar Gundy 25 yard pass to Cale Cabbiness, Alex Hale kick (Drive: 7 plays, 83 yards, 2:05; OSU 56–7)

Fourth Quarter

- (13:59) OSU – Ollie Gordon II 53 yard rush, Alex Hale kick (Drive: 7 plays, 89 yards, 1:37; OSU 63–7)

| Statistics | APB | OKST |
|---|---|---|
| First downs | 13 | 26 |
| Total yards | 230 | 538 |
| Rushes/yards | 31/81 | 27/168 |
| Passing yards | 149 | 370 |
| Passing: Comp–Att–Int | 16–41 | 25–38–1 |
| Time of possession | 37:35 | 22:25 |

| Team | Category | Player | Statistics |
|---|---|---|---|
| Arkansas-Pine Bluff | Passing | Skyler Perry | 11/27, 70 yards, 1 TD |
| Arkansas-Pine Bluff | Rushing | Johnny Williams | 5 carries, 18 yards |
| Arkansas-Pine Bluff | Receiving | Javaughn Williams | 4 receptions, 21 yards |
| Oklahoma State | Passing | Gunnar Gundy | 12/20, 128 yards, 2 TD's, 1 INT |
| Oklahoma State | Rushing | Ollie Gordon II | 3 carries, 65 yards |
| Oklahoma State | Receiving | Braydon Johnson | 4 receptions, 86 yards, 2 TD's |
