= Davius Richard =

American football player (born 2001)

No. 11
- Position: Quarterback

Personal information
- Born: January 15, 2001 (age 25)
- Listed height: 6 ft 3 in (1.91 m)
- Listed weight: 220 lb (100 kg)

Career information
- High school: Glades Central (Belle Glade, Florida)
- College: North Carolina Central (2019–2023)
- NFL draft: 2024: undrafted

Career history
- Houston Roughnecks (2025)*
- * Offseason or practice squad member only

Awards and highlights
- Deacon Jones Trophy (2023); HBCU Legacy Bowl Offensive MVP (2024); BOXTOROW HBCU All-American (2023); College Football Network HBCU All-American (2023); FCS All-American (2023); 2× MEAC Offensive Player of the Year (2022, 2023); 3× All-MEAC Selection (2021-2023); Celebration Bowl Offensive MVP (2022)

Davius Richard (born January 15, 2001) is an American former professional football quarterback who played in the United Football League (UFL) for a season with the Houston Roughnecks. He played college football for the North Carolina Central Eagles.

== Early life ==
Richard attended Glades Central High School, where he passed for 3,274 yards and 29 touchdowns as a senior. He committed to play college football for the North Carolina Central Eagles.

== College career ==
In his first two seasons in 2019 and 2021, Richard threw for 4,130 yards and 27 touchdowns with 15 interceptions, while also adding 602 yards and 11 touchdowns on the ground. In the 2022 Celebration Bowl, he totaled 272 yards and three touchdowns in a win over Jackson State. In 2022, Richard led the Eagles to a Black college national championship. He finished the 2022 season passing for 2,661 yards and 25 touchdowns, while also adding 15 touchdowns on the ground, and was named the MEAC offensive player of the year.

In 2023, Richard completed 60.8% of his pass attempts for 2,177 yards and 21 touchdowns with four interceptions. He also rushed for 630 yards and 18 touchdowns. Richard was again named the MEAC offensive player of the year and the co-winner of the Deacon Jones Award. After the season, he declared for the 2024 NFL draft. He was invited to participate in the 2024 HBCU Legacy Bowl Game, where he completed both of his passes for 53 yards and rushed for a four-yard touchdown as he was named the game's offensive MVP. However during the game, Richard suffered an ankle injury which caused him to miss most of the game.

Richard finished his career at North Carolina Central throwing for 8,968 yards and 73 touchdowns with just 29 interceptions, while also rushing for 2,575 yards and 44 touchdowns.

== Professional career ==
On July 25, 2024, Richard signed with the Houston Roughnecks of the United Football League (UFL). He retired on February 10, 2025.
