= 2022 Jackson State Tigers football team =

American college football season

2022 Jackson State Tigers football

SWAC champion SWAC East Division champion

SWAC Championship Game, W 43–24 vs Southern

Celebration Bowl, L 34–41 ^{OT}vs. North Carolina Central
- Conference: Southwestern Athletic Conference
- East Division

Ranking
- STATS: No. 16
- FCS Coaches: No. 11
- Record: 12–1 (8–0 SWAC)
- Head coach: Deion Sanders (3rd season)
- Offensive coordinator: Brett Bartolone (1st season)
- Offensive scheme: Spread option
- Defensive coordinator: Dennis Thurman (3rd season)
- Base defense: 3–4
- Home stadium: Mississippi Veterans Memorial Stadium

2022 Southwestern Athletic Conference football standings
	Conf.			Overall
Team	W		L	W		L
East Division
No. 16 Jackson State xy$	8	–	0	12	–	1
Florida A&M	7	–	1	9	–	2
Alabama State	4	–	4	6	–	5
Alabama A&M	4	–	4	4	–	7
Bethune–Cookman	2	–	6	2	–	9
Mississippi Valley State	2	–	6	2	–	9
West Division
Southern xy	5	–	3	7	–	5
Prairie View A&M x	5	–	3	6	–	5
Alcorn State	4	–	4	5	–	6
Texas Southern	4	–	4	5	–	6
Grambling State	2	–	6	3	–	8
Arkansas–Pine Bluff	1	–	7	3	–	8
Championship: Jackson State 43, Southern 24
$ – Conference champion; x – Division champion/co-champions; y – Championship game participant; Rankings from STATS Poll

The 2022 Jackson State Tigers football team represented Jackson State University as a member of the East Division of the Southwestern Athletic Conference (SWAC) during the 2022 NCAA Division I FCS football season. Led by third-year head coach Deion Sanders, the Tigers played their home games at Mississippi Veterans Memorial Stadium in Jackson, Mississippi. Jackson State won their second straight SWAC East Division championship and their second straight SWAC title under Sanders leadership, finishing the regular season undefeated, 12–0. The Tigers played MEAC champion North Carolina Central in the 2022 Celebration Bowl in Atlanta, and lost. Sanders resigned as the team's head coach after winning the SWAC championship on December 3, 2022 to become the head coach at Colorado.

== Schedule ==
Date	Time	Opponent	Rank	Site	TV	Result	Attendance
September 4	2:00 p.m.	vs. Florida A&M	No. 15	Hard Rock Stadium; Miami Gardens, FL (Orange Blossom Classic)	ESPN2	W 59–3	39,907
September 10	6:00 p.m.	vs. Tennessee State*	No. 13	Simmons Bank Liberty Stadium; Memphis, TN (Southern Heritage Classic)		W 16–3	51,351
September 17	1:00 p.m.	Grambling State*	No. 11	Mississippi Veterans Memorial Stadium; Jackson, MS	ESPN3	W 66–24	34,451
September 24	3:00 p.m.	Mississippi Valley State	No. 11	Mississippi Veterans Memorial Stadium; Jackson, MS	ESPN+	W 49–7	28,265
October 8	2:00 p.m.	at Alabama State	No. 8	New ASU Stadium; Montgomery, AL	ESPNU	W 26–12	28,332
October 15	3:00 p.m.	at Bethune–Cookman	No. 8т	TIAA Bank Field; Jacksonville, FL	ESPN+	W 48–8	22,373
October 22	2:00 p.m.	Campbell*^{†}	No. 9	Mississippi Veterans Memorial Stadium; Jackson, MS	ESPN+	W 22–14	51,596
October 29	1:00 p.m.	Southern	No. 9	Mississippi Veterans Memorial Stadium; Jackson, MS (rivalry/College GameDay)	ESPN3	W 35–0	53,885
November 5	4:00 p.m.	at Texas Southern	No. 9	PNC Stadium; Houston, TX	ESPN+	W 41–14	21,092
November 12	4:00 p.m.	vs. Alabama A&M	No. 9	Ladd–Peebles Stadium; Mobile, AL (Gulf Coast Challenge)	ESPN+	W 27–13	32,300
November 19	3:00 p.m.	at Alcorn State	No. 10	Casem-Spinks Stadium; Lorman, MS (Soul Bowl)	ESPN+	W 24–13	31,017
December 3	4:00 p.m.	Southern*	No. 10	Mississippi Veterans Memorial Stadium; Jackson, MS (SWAC Championship)	ESPN2	W 43–24	53,754
December 17	12:00 p.m.	vs. North Carolina Central*	No. 10	Mercedes-Benz Stadium; Atlanta, GA (Celebration Bowl)	ABC	L 34–41 ^{OT}	49,670
*Non-conference game; ^{†}Homecoming; Rankings from STATS Poll released prior to the game; All times are in Central time

== Rankings ==
Ranking movements Legend: ██ Increase in ranking ██ Decrease in ranking т = Tied with team above or below ( ) = First-place votes
	Week													
Poll	Pre	1	2	3	4	5	6	7	8	9	10	11	12	Final
STATS	15	13	11	11	9	8	8т	9 (2)	9 (1)	9	9	10	10	16
FCS Coaches	17	15	11	11	8	8	7	6	5	5	5	5	5	11

== Roster ==
2022 Jackson State Tigers football team roster
Players
Coaches
Offense

Pos.	#	Name	Class
WR	1	Camron Buckley	GS
QB	2	Shedeur Sanders	So
WR	3	Kevin Coleman Jr.	Fr
WR	4	Dallas Daniels	GS
WR	5	Shane Hooks	Sr
WR	6	Mark Pope	GS
QB	7	J. P. Andrade	Sr
RB	8	JD Martin	Jr
WR	9	Quaydarius Davis	Fr
WR	10	Willie Gaines	Jr
WR	11	Rico Powers	So
QB	12	Greyson Thompson	So
WR	13	Malachi Wideman	Jr
WR	14	Christian Allen	So
WR	15	Trevonte Rucker	So
QB	16	Norman Douglas Jr.	Jr
QB	17	Bronson McClelland	So
QB	18	Matthew Ricciardi-Vitale	GS
RB	22	Christopher Smith	So
WR	23	Tayari Sherwood	So
RB	24	Desmond Moultrie	So
RB	25	Tyson Alexander	So
WR	26	J. J. Weeks	Fr
WR	29	Andre Hunt	Jr
RB	33	Caleb Jolivette	Sr
RB	36	Sy'veon Wilkerson	So
RB	38	Santee Marshall	Sr
RB	40	Donovan Hunt	Fr
RB	44	Reginald Swinton	Fr
RB	47	Kevin May	Fr
RB	49	Emari Matthews	Fr
OL	51	Zachary Breaux	GS
OL	54	Shauntavis Vardaman	GS
OL	56	Tyler Brown	So
OL	59	Trace Shumans	So
OL	61	Keivion Whaley	So
OL	63	Amari Ward	Fr
OL	64	Deontae Graham	Jr
OL	66	Josiah Laban	Fr
OL	67	Elliot Blackmon	Jr
OL	70	Kirk Ford	So
OL	71	Evan Henry	So
OL	72	Demetri Jordan	Sr
OL	73	Willis Patrick	Sr
OL	74	Tony Gray	Sr
OL	77	Jasper Friis	Jr
OL	79	Devin Hayes	GS
TE	81	Jency Riley	So
WR	82	David Studstill	Jr
WR	83	Kobe Paul	Fr
TE	84	Hayden Hagler	Jr
TE	86	DJ Stevens	GS
TE	88	Alex Henton	So
WR	89	Julian Smith	So

Defense

Pos.	#	Name	Class
CB	4	De'Jahn Warren	Sr
DB	5	Ke'Vric Wiggins Jr.	So
S	6	John Huggins	Jr
S	7	Cam'Ron Silmon-Craig	So
S	9	Gregory Grate	GS
CB/wr	12	Travis Hunter	Fr
S	19	Herman Smith III	So
S	21	Shilo Sanders	So
DL	22	Antonio Doyle	Jr
CB	23	Isaiah Bolden	Sr
CB	26	Anthony Petty	So
CB	27	Jalin Hughes	So
CB	28	Tayvion Beasley	Fr
S	29	Jalen Alexander	GS
DL	31	Jason Mercier	Sr
LB	32	Jurriente Davis	Jr
CB	33	Delano Salgado	GS
S	35	Michael Thompson	Sr
CB	36	Marquis Johnson	Sr
S	39	Dazerick Patton	Fr
CB	40	Frankie Dunn	Fr
DL	41	Michael Pleas Jr.	So
LB	42	Jeremiah Brown	So
LB	44	Daelyn Dunn	Sr
LB	45	Aubrey Miller Jr.	Sr
LB	47	Baron Hopson	So
LB	48	Cole Cucitrone	Jr
DL	50	Charlton Goodell	So
LB	51	Jackson Barry	Fr
LB	52	Khalil Arrington	Jr
LB	53	Donald Turley	Fr
LB	54	Bobby Ragas	So
LB	57	Nyles Gaddy	So
DL	60	Tre'von Riggins	So
DL	62	Kejuan Barbee	So
DL	65	Timontre Graham	Sr
DL	68	Rufus Carl Jones	Fr
DL	75	Zyon Walker	So
DL	90	Katron Evans	So
DL	91	Josh Griffis	Jr
DL	92	Justin Ragin	GS
DL	93	Kris Cassel	Fr
DL	94	Tru Thompson	Jr
DL	95	Julius Reynolds	Fr
DL	96	Jelani Davis	Jr
DL	97	Devonta Davis	So
DL	98	Jacob Humphrey	So
DL	99	Jeremiah Williams	Fr

Special teams

Pos.	#	Name	Class
P	30	Lane McGregor	Sr
K	35	Glenn Misiak	So
LS	37	Jacob Politte	Fr
K	39	Gerardo Baeza	So
K	43	Alejandro Mata	Fr
P	46	Sam Johnson	Jr
LS	58	Aarion Hartman	GS

Head coach

- Deion Sanders

Coordinators/assistant coaches

- Brett Bartolone (Offensive coordinator / Quarterbacks)
- Dennis Thurman (Defensive coordinator)
- Alan Ricard (Special Teams coordinator)
- Gary Harrell (Running backs)
- Andre' Hart (Linebackers)
- Mike Markuson (Offensive line)
- Kevin Mathis (Cornerbacks)
- Tim Brewster (Tight ends)
- T. C. Taylor (Wide receivers)
- Jeff Weeks (Defensive line)

Legend

- (C) Team captain
- (S) Suspended
- (I) Ineligible
- Injured
- Redshirt

Roster
Last update: August 28, 2022

== Game summaries ==
=== Vs. Florida A&M (Orange Blossom Classic) ===
	1	2	3	4	Total
Rattlers	0	3	0	0	3
No. 15 Tigers	7	17	21	14	59

Statistics	FAMU	JKST
First downs	13	27
Total yards	155	471
Rushing yards	34	139
Passing yards	121	332
Turnovers	4	0
Time of possession	24:19	35:41

Team	Category	Player	Statistics
Florida A&M	Passing	Jeremy Moussa	11/27, 102 yards, INT
Florida A&M	Rushing	Terrell Jennings	9 rushes, 30 yards
Florida A&M	Receiving	Darian Oxendine	1 reception, 32 yards
Jackson State	Passing	Shedeur Sanders	29/33, 323 yards, 5 TD
Jackson State	Rushing	Santee Marshall	13 rushes, 65 yards
Jackson State	Receiving	Dallas Daniels	5 receptions, 59 yards, TD

=== Vs. Tennessee State (Southern Heritage Classic) ===
	1	2	3	4	Total
No. 13 JKST Tigers	0	6	3	7	16
TNST Tigers	3	0	0	0	3

Statistics	JKST	TNST
First downs	24	11
Total yards	418	140
Rushing yards	142	2
Passing yards	276	138
Turnovers	2	0
Time of possession	33:47	26:13

Team	Category	Player	Statistics
Jackson State	Passing	Shedeur Sanders	30/44, 276 yards, TD
Jackson State	Rushing	Sy'veon Wilkerson	15 rushes, 81 yards
Jackson State	Receiving	Dallas Daniels	6 receptions, 51 yards
Tennessee State	Passing	Draylen Ellis	10/24, 138 yards
Tennessee State	Rushing	Devon Starling	18 rushes, 70 yards
Tennessee State	Receiving	Cam Wyche	2 receptions, 52 yards

=== Grambling State ===
	1	2	3	4	Total
GRAM Tigers	7	10	0	7	24
No. 11 JKST Tigers	14	7	24	21	66

Statistics	GRAM	JKST
First downs	10	32
Total yards	239	608
Rushing yards	116	195
Passing yards	123	413
Turnovers	4	3
Time of possession	24:51	33:56

Team	Category	Player	Statistics
Grambling State	Passing	Quaterius Hawkins	12/30, 123 yards, TD, 2 INT
Grambling State	Rushing	Maurice Washington	3 rushes, 78 yards, TD
Grambling State	Receiving	Lyndon Rash	4 receptions, 97 yards, TD
Jackson State	Passing	Shedeur Sanders	22/34, 357 yards, 4 TD
Jackson State	Rushing	Sy'veon Wilkerson	23 rushes, 141 yards, 2 TD
Jackson State	Receiving	Dallas Daniels	7 receptions, 120 yards, 3 TD

=== Mississippi Valley State ===
	1	2	3	4	Total
Delta Devils	7	0	0	0	7
No. 11 Tigers	14	7	21	7	49

Statistics	MVSU	JKST
First downs	9	28
Total yards	217	625
Rushing yards	181	200
Passing yards	36	425
Turnovers	1	2
Time of possession	34:23	25:37

Team	Category	Player	Statistics
Mississippi Valley State	Passing	Jamari Jones	3/12, 36 yards, TD, INT
Mississippi Valley State	Rushing	Caleb Johnson	11 rushes, 65 yards
Mississippi Valley State	Receiving	Jacory Rankin	1 reception, 25 yards, TD
Jackson State	Passing	Shedeur Sanders	40/51, 425 yards, 4 TD, INT
Jackson State	Rushing	Santee Marshall	6 rushes, 118 yards
Jackson State	Receiving	Dallas Daniels	10 receptions, 142 yards

=== At Alabama State ===
	1	2	3	4	Total
No. 8 Tigers	0	10	7	9	26
Hornets	6	0	0	6	12

Statistics	JKST	ALST
First downs	27	13
Total yards	441	177
Rushing yards	109	39
Passing yards	332	138
Turnovers	1	1
Time of possession	35:02	24:58

Team	Category	Player	Statistics
Jackson State	Passing	Shedeur Sanders	30/46, 332 yards, 3 TD, INT
Jackson State	Rushing	Sy'veon Wilkerson	19 rushes, 88 yards
Jackson State	Receiving	Willie Gaines	4 receptions, 65 yards, TD
Alabama State	Passing	Myles Crawley	10/17, 78 yards, INT
Alabama State	Rushing	Santo Dunn	6 rushes, 26 yards
Alabama State	Receiving	Kisean Johnson	4 receptions, 49 yards, TD

=== At Bethune–Cookman ===
	1	2	3	4	Total
No. 8т Tigers	21	9	9	9	48
Wildcats	0	0	0	8	8

Statistics	JKST	BCU
First downs	26	10
Total yards	496	158
Rushing yards	224	39
Passing yards	272	119
Turnovers	2	2
Time of possession	32:56	27:04

Team	Category	Player	Statistics
Jackson State	Passing	Shedeur Sanders	36/48, 272 yards, 5 TD, 2 INT
Jackson State	Rushing	Santee Marshall	10 carries, 71 yards, TD
Jackson State	Receiving	Dallas Daniels	7 receptions, 55 yards, 2 TD
Bethune–Cookman	Passing	Jalon Jones	9/24, 90 yards, TD
Bethune–Cookman	Rushing	Que'shaun Byrd	7 carries, 55 yards
Bethune–Cookman	Receiving	Dylaan Lee	2 receptions, 36 yards

=== Campbell ===
	1	2	3	4	Total
Fighting Camels	7	0	0	7	14
No. 9 Tigers	3	6	6	7	22

Statistics	CAM	JKST
First downs	13	20
Total yards	247	411
Rushing yards	110	178
Passing yards	137	233
Turnovers	1	2
Time of possession	27:06	32:54

Team	Category	Player	Statistics
Campbell	Passing	Hajj-Malik Williams	15/28, 131 yards, TD
Campbell	Rushing	Lamagea McDowell	9 carries, 48 yards
Campbell	Receiving	Julian Hill	4 receptions, 33 yards, TD
Jackson State	Passing	Shedeur Sanders	23/31, 233 yards, TD, INT
Jackson State	Rushing	Sy'veon Wilkerson	24 carries, 116 yards, TD
Jackson State	Receiving	Dallas Daniels	6 receptions, 63 yards

=== Southern ===
	1	2	3	4	Total
Jaguars	0	0	0	0	0
No. 9 Tigers	0	22	6	7	35

Statistics	SOU	JKST
First downs	10	22
Total yards	221	362
Rushing yards	136	154
Passing yards	85	208
Turnovers	2	1
Time of possession	31:43	28:17

Team	Category	Player	Statistics
Southern	Passing	Besean McCray	9/26, 85 yards, INT
Southern	Rushing	Karl Ligon	17 carries, 66 yards
Southern	Receiving	Cassius Allen	6 receptions, 63 yards
Jackson State	Passing	Shedeur Sanders	18/33, 194 yards, TD
Jackson State	Rushing	Sy'veon Wilkerson	21 carries, 96 yards, TD
Jackson State	Receiving	Dallas Daniels	5 receptions, 67 yards

=== At Texas Southern ===
	1	2	3	4	Total
No. 9 JSU Tigers	21	0	13	7	41
TXSO Tigers	7	0	7	0	14

Statistics	JKST	TXSO
First downs	24	13
Total yards	491	262
Rushing yards	232	130
Passing yards	259	132
Turnovers	1	0
Time of possession	34:06	25:54

Team	Category	Player	Statistics
Jackson State	Passing	Shedeur Sanders	23/30, 252 yards, 3 TD
Jackson State	Rushing	Sy'veon Wilkerson	26 carries, 214 yards, 2 TD
Jackson State	Receiving	DJ Stevens	3 receptions, 56 yards, TD
Texas Southern	Passing	Andrew Body	9/23, 132 yards, TD
Texas Southern	Rushing	Jacorey Howard	14 carries, 38 yards, TD
Texas Southern	Receiving	Randy Masters	1 reception, 43 yards

=== Vs. Alabama A&M ===
	1	2	3	4	Total
No. 9 Tigers	7	14	6	0	27
Bulldogs	10	0	0	3	13

Statistics	AAMU	JKST
First downs	20	18
Total yards	318	353
Rushing yards	183	151
Passing yards	135	202
Turnovers	3	2
Time of possession	34:49	25:11

Team	Category	Player	Statistics
Alabama A&M	Passing	Xavier Lankford	8/17, 72 yards
Alabama A&M	Rushing	Donovan Eaglin	22 carries, 89 yards, TD
Alabama A&M	Receiving	Terrell Gardner	4 receptions, 47 yards
Jackson State	Passing	Shedeur Sanders	13/24, 183 yards, 4 TD
Jackson State	Rushing	Sy'veon Wilkerson	21 carries, 95 yards
Jackson State	Receiving	Travis Hunter	4 receptions, 40 yards, TD

=== At Alcorn State (Soul Bowl) ===
	1	2	3	4	Total
No. 10 Tigers	3	14	0	7	24
Braves	0	7	3	3	13

Statistics	JKST	ALCN
First downs	15	15
Total yards	258	251
Rushing yards	42	68
Passing yards	216	183
Turnovers	2	2
Time of possession	30:12	29:48

Team	Category	Player	Statistics
Jackson State	Passing	Shedeur Sanders	18/29, 216 yards, TD, INT
Jackson State	Rushing	Sy'veon Wilkerson	21 carries, 63 yards, TD
Jackson State	Receiving	Travis Hunter	2 receptions, 49 yards, TD
Alcorn State	Passing	Tre Lawrence	8/23, 153 yards, INT
Alcorn State	Rushing	Jarveon Howard	28 carries, 96 yards, TD
Alcorn State	Receiving	Monterio Hunt	4 receptions, 109 yards

=== Southern (SWAC Championship) ===
	1	2	3	4	Total
Jaguars	0	10	14	0	24
No. 10 Tigers	26	7	10	0	43

Statistics	SOU	JKST
First downs	20	25
Total yards	412	439
Rushing yards	195	119
Passing yards	217	320
Turnovers	5	2
Time of possession	27:57	32:03

Team	Category	Player	Statistics
Southern	Passing	Glendon McDaniel	15/34, 220 yards, TD, 2 INT
Southern	Rushing	Glendon McDaniel	20 carries, 162 yards, 2 TD
Southern	Receiving	Ed Magee	3 receptions, 68 yards
Jackson State	Passing	Shedeur Sanders	30/43, 320 yards, 4 TD
Jackson State	Rushing	Sy'veon Wilkerson	15 carries, 61 yards, TD
Jackson State	Receiving	Willie Gaines	7 receptions, 76 yards

=== Vs. North Carolina Central (Celebration Bowl) ===
	1	2	3	4	OT	Total
No. 10 Tigers	7	14	0	13	0	34
Eagles	10	7	9	8	7	41

Statistics	JKST	NCCU
First downs	24	24
Total yards	417	482
Rushing yards	68	276
Passing yards	349	206
Turnovers	1	0
Time of possession	21:51	38:09

Team	Category	Player	Statistics
Jackson State	Passing	Shedeur Sanders	30/40, 349 yards, 4 TD
Jackson State	Rushing	Sy'veon Wilkerson	15 rushes, 52 yards
Jackson State	Receiving	Kevin Coleman Jr.	7 receptions, 137 yards, TD
North Carolina Central	Passing	Davius Richard	15/20, 175 yards, TD
North Carolina Central	Rushing	Latrell Collier	17 rushes, 98 yards, TD
North Carolina Central	Receiving	E. J. Hicks	3 receptions, 84 yards
