= 2022 Prairie View A&M Panthers football team =

American college football season

2022 Prairie View A&M Panthers football
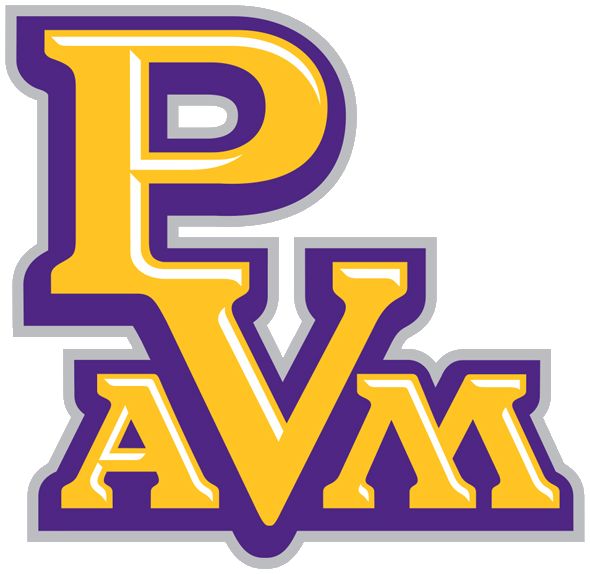

SWAC West Division co-champion
- Conference: Southwestern Athletic Conference
- West Division
- Record: 6–5 (5–3 SWAC)
- Head coach: Bubba McDowell (1st season)
- Offensive coordinator: Mark Frederick (1st season)
- Defensive coordinator: Todd Middleton (1st season)
- Home stadium: Panther Stadium at Blackshear Field

2022 Southwestern Athletic Conference football standings
	Conf.			Overall
Team	W		L	W		L
East Division
No. 16 Jackson State xy$	8	–	0	12	–	1
Florida A&M	7	–	1	9	–	2
Alabama State	4	–	4	6	–	5
Alabama A&M	4	–	4	4	–	7
Bethune–Cookman	2	–	6	2	–	9
Mississippi Valley State	2	–	6	2	–	9
West Division
Southern xy	5	–	3	7	–	5
Prairie View A&M x	5	–	3	6	–	5
Alcorn State	4	–	4	5	–	6
Texas Southern	4	–	4	5	–	6
Grambling State	2	–	6	3	–	8
Arkansas–Pine Bluff	1	–	7	3	–	8
Championship: Jackson State 43, Southern 24
$ – Conference champion; x – Division champion/co-champions; y – Championship game participant; Rankings from STATS Poll

The 2022 Prairie View A&M Panthers football team represented Prairie View A&M University as a member of the West Division of Southwestern Athletic Conference (SWAC) during the 2022 NCAA Division I FCS football season. Led by first-year head coach Bubba McDowell, the Panthers compiled an overall record of 6–5 with mark of 5–3 in conference play, sharing the SWAC West Division title with Southern. Prairie View A&M played home games at Panther Stadium at Blackshear Field in Prairie View, Texas.

== Schedule ==
Prairie View A&M finalized their 2022 schedule on February 3, 2022.

Date	Time	Opponent	Site	TV	Result	Attendance
September 3	6:00 p.m.	at Texas Southern	Panther Stadium at Blackshear Field; Prairie View, TX (Labor Day Classic)	ESPN+	W 40–23	13,233
September 10	7:00 p.m.	at Abilene Christian*	Anthony Field at Wildcat Stadium; Abilene, TX	ESPN+	L 13–21	6,236
September 17	6:00 p.m.	No. 6 Incarnate Word*	Panther Stadium at Blackshear Field; Prairie View, TX	ESPN+	L 14–31	4,338
September 24		at Alabama State	New ASU Stadium; Montgomery, AL		W 25–15	6,976
October 1	4:00 p.m.	vs. Grambling State	Cotton Bowl; Dallas, TX (State Fair Classic)	HBCU Go	W 34–14	53,971
October 8	4:00 p.m.	Southern	Panther Stadium at Blackshear Field; Prairie View, TX	ESPN+	L 13–45	11,289
October 22	4:00 p.m.	at Lamar*	Provost Umphrey Stadium; Beaumont, TX	ESPN3	W 54–21	6,627
October 29	2:00 p.m.	Bethune–Cookman^{†}	Panther Stadium at Blackshear Field; Prairie View, TX		W 58–48	14,599
November 4	6:30 p.m.	Alcorn State	Panther Stadium at Blackshear Field; Prairie View, TX	ESPNU	L 16–23 ^{OT}	6,562
November 12	2:00 p.m.	at Arkansas–Pine Bluff	Simmons Bank Field; Pine Bluff, AR	Golden Lions All-Access	W 55–24	3,148
November 19	1:00 p.m.	at Mississippi Valley State	Rice–Totten Stadium; Itta Bena, MS	YouTube	L 7–27	3,097
*Non-conference game; ^{†}Homecoming; Rankings from STATS Poll released prior to the game; All times are in Central time
