= 2022 Texas Southern Tigers football team =

American college football season

2022 Texas Southern Tigers football
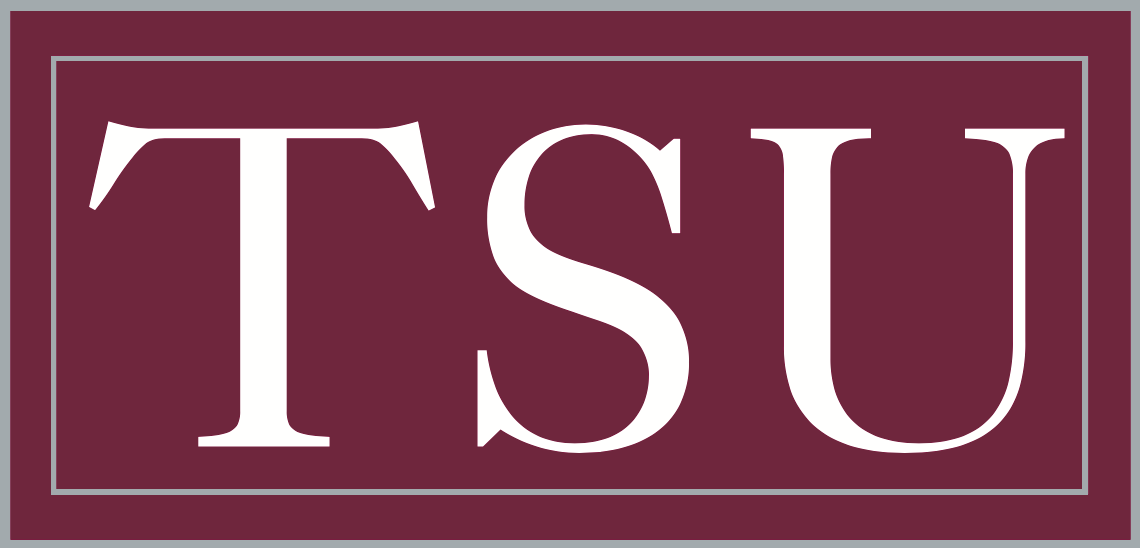
- Conference: Southwestern Athletic Conference
- West Division
- Record: 5–6 (4–4 SWAC)
- Head coach: Clarence McKinney (4th season)
- Offensive coordinator: David Marsh (4th season)
- Defensive coordinator: Jeffery Ceasar (4th season)
- Home stadium: PNC Stadium

2022 Southwestern Athletic Conference football standings
	Conf.			Overall
Team	W		L	W		L
East Division
No. 16 Jackson State xy$	8	–	0	12	–	1
Florida A&M	7	–	1	9	–	2
Alabama State	4	–	4	6	–	5
Alabama A&M	4	–	4	4	–	7
Bethune–Cookman	2	–	6	2	–	9
Mississippi Valley State	2	–	6	2	–	9
West Division
Southern xy	5	–	3	7	–	5
Prairie View A&M x	5	–	3	6	–	5
Alcorn State	4	–	4	5	–	6
Texas Southern	4	–	4	5	–	6
Grambling State	2	–	6	3	–	8
Arkansas–Pine Bluff	1	–	7	3	–	8
Championship: Jackson State 43, Southern 24
$ – Conference champion; x – Division champion/co-champions; y – Championship game participant; Rankings from STATS Poll

The 2022 Texas Southern Tigers football team represented Texas Southern University a member of the West Division of the Southwestern Athletic Conference (SWAC) during the 2022 NCAA Division I FCS football season. Led fourth-year head coach Clarence McKinney, the Tigers compiled an overall record of 5–6 with a mark of 4–4 in conference play, tying for third place in the SWAC's West Division. Texas Southern played home games at PNC Stadium in Houston.

== Schedule ==
Texas Southern finalized its 2022 schedule on February 26, 2022.

Date	Time	Opponent	Site	TV	Result	Attendance
September 3	6:00 p.m.	at Prairie View A&M	Panther Stadium at Blackshear Field; Prairie View, TX (Labor Day Classic)	ESPN+	L 23–40	13,233
September 10	6:30 p.m.	at North Texas*	Apogee Stadium; Denton, TX	ESPN3	L 27–59	15,984
September 17	4:00 p.m.	vs. Southern	Choctaw Stadium; Arlington, TX	HBCU Go	W 24–0	16,667
September 24	2:30 p.m.	at UTSA*	Alamodome; San Antonio, TX	Stadium	L 24–52	22,562
October 1	6:00 p.m.	Alabama State	PNC Stadium; Houston, TX	ATTSW	L 13–16	6,746
October 8	2:00 p.m.	at Arkansas–Pine Bluff	Simmons Bank Field; Pine Bluff, AR	Golden Lions All-Access	W 24–17	13,249
October 22	2:00 p.m.	at Alcorn State	Casem-Spinks Stadium; Lorman, MS	ESPN+	W 34–27	20,645
October 29	2:00 p.m.	Lincoln (CA)*^{†}	Alexander Durley Sports Complex; Houston, TX	ATTSW	W 37–2	6,500
November 5	4:00 p.m.	No. 9 Jackson State	PNC Stadium; Houston, TX	ESPN+	L 14–41	21,092
November 12	6:00 p.m.	Grambling State	PNC Stadium; Houston, TX	ESPN+	W 41–7	8,372
November 19	1:00 p.m.	at Alabama A&M	Louis Crews Stadium; Huntsville, AL	HBCU Go	L 20–24	1,397
*Non-conference game; ^{†}Homecoming; Rankings from STATS Poll released prior to the game; All times are in Central time
