= 2022 Southern Jaguars football team =

American college football season

2022 Southern Jaguars football
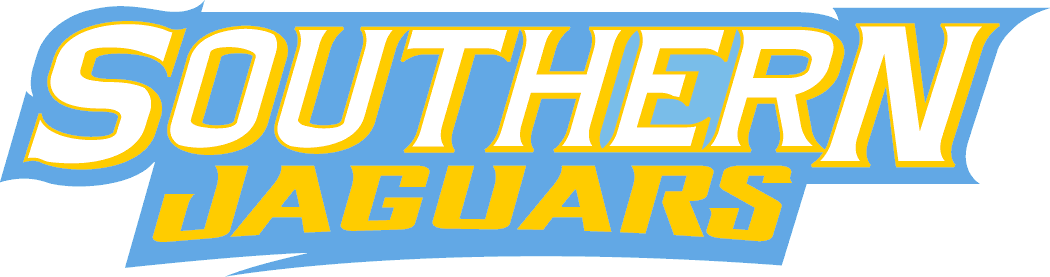

SWAC West Division co-champion

SWAC Championship Game, L 24–43 vs Jackson State
- Conference: Southwestern Athletic Conference
- West Division
- Record: 7–5 (5–3 SWAC)
- Head coach: Eric Dooley (1st season)
- Defensive coordinator: Henry Miller (1st season)
- Home stadium: A. W. Mumford Stadium

2022 Southwestern Athletic Conference football standings
	Conf.			Overall
Team	W		L	W		L
East Division
No. 16 Jackson State xy$	8	–	0	12	–	1
Florida A&M	7	–	1	9	–	2
Alabama State	4	–	4	6	–	5
Alabama A&M	4	–	4	4	–	7
Bethune–Cookman	2	–	6	2	–	9
Mississippi Valley State	2	–	6	2	–	9
West Division
Southern xy	5	–	3	7	–	5
Prairie View A&M x	5	–	3	6	–	5
Alcorn State	4	–	4	5	–	6
Texas Southern	4	–	4	5	–	6
Grambling State	2	–	6	3	–	8
Arkansas–Pine Bluff	1	–	7	3	–	8
Championship: Jackson State 43, Southern 24
$ – Conference champion; x – Division champion/co-champions; y – Championship game participant; Rankings from STATS Poll

The 2022 Southern Jaguars football team represented Southern University as a member of the Southwestern Athletic Conference (SWAC) during the 2022 NCAA Division I FCS football season. They were led by head coach Eric Dooley, who was coaching his first season with the program. The Jaguars played their home games at A. W. Mumford Stadium in Baton Rouge, Louisiana.

In Southern's first game against Florida Memorial, an NAIA team, they won 86-0. This was the most points Southern had scored since 1949, when they defeated Xavier (LA) 87-0.

== Schedule ==
Southern finalized their 2022 schedule on February 1, 2022.

Date	Time	Opponent	Site	TV	Result	Attendance
September 3	6:00 p.m.	Florida Memorial*	A. W. Mumford Stadium; Baton Rouge, LA	ESPN+	W 86–0	15,263
September 10	6:30 p.m.	at LSU*	Tiger Stadium; Baton Rouge, LA	SECN	L 17–65	102,321
September 17	4:00 p.m.	vs. Texas Southern	Choctaw Stadium; Arlington, TX	HBCU Go	L 0–24	16,667
October 1	6:00 p.m.	Arkansas–Pine Bluff	A. W. Mumford Stadium; Baton Rouge, LA	ESPN+	W 59–3	15,792
October 8	4:00 p.m.	at Prairie View A&M	Panther Stadium at Blackshear Field; Prairie View, TX	ESPN+	W 45–13	11,289
October 15	6:00 p.m.	Alcorn State	A. W. Mumford Stadium; Baton Rouge, LA	Jaguar Sports Network	W 21–17	26,900
October 22	4:00 p.m.	Virginia–Lynchburg*^{†}	A. W. Mumford Stadium; Baton Rouge, LA	Jaguar Sports Network	W 51–7	23,489
October 29	1:00 p.m.	at No. 9 Jackson State	Mississippi Veterans Memorial Stadium; Jackson, MS (rivalry/College GameDay)	ESPN3	L 0–35	53,885
November 5	5:00 p.m.	at Florida A&M	Bragg Memorial Stadium; Tallahassee, FL	ESPNU	L 16–30	15,126
November 12	4:00 p.m.	Mississippi Valley State	A. W. Mumford Stadium; Baton Rouge, LA	ESPN+	W 27–7	17,776
November 26	1:00 p.m.	vs. Grambling State	Caesars Superdome; New Orleans, LA (Bayou Classic)	NBC	W 34–17	62,337
December 3	4:00 p.m.	at No. 10 Jackson State	Mississippi Veterans Memorial Stadium; Jackson, MS (SWAC Championship)	ESPN2	L 24–43	
*Non-conference game; ^{†}Homecoming; Rankings from STATS Poll released prior to the game; All times are in Central time

== Game summaries ==
=== Florida Memorial ===
	1	2	3	4	Total
Lions	0	0	0	0	0
Jaguars	42	14	16	14	86

=== At LSU ===
Southern Jaguars at LSU Tigers – Game summary

Quarter	1	2	3	4	Total
Jaguars	0	0	7	10	17
Tigers	37	14	7	7	65

at Tiger Stadium, Baton Rouge, Louisiana

- Date: September 10
- Game time: 6:30 p.m. CDT
- Game weather: Sunny, 86 °F (30 °C)
- Game attendance: 102,321
- Referee: Scott Walker
- TV announcers (SECN): Tom Hart, Jordan Rodgers and Cole Cubelic
- Box score, Recap

Game information

First quarter

- LSU – Jayden Daniels 18-yard run (Damian Ramos kick), 13:25. Tigers 7–0. Drive: 3 plays, 21 yards, 1:29.
- LSU – Josh Williams 5-yard run (Damian Ramos kick), 11:46. Tigers 14–0. Drive: 4 plays, 62 yards, 1:13.
- LSU – Jack Bech 17-yard pass from Jayden Daniels (Damian Ramos kick), 7:16. Tigers 21–0. Drive: 5 plays, 71 yards, 2:52.
- LSU – Micah Baskerville 29-yard interception return (Damian Ramos kick), 7:07. Tigers 28–0.
- LSU – Malik Nabers 5-yard pass from Jayden Daniels (Damian Ramos kick), 4:44. Tigers 35–0. Drive: 4 plays, 24 yards, 0:59.
- LSU – Micah Baskerville blocked punt for a safety, 1:31. Tigers 37–0.

Second quarter

- LSU – Brian Thomas Jr. 44-yard pass from Jayden Daniels (Damian Ramos kick), 14:20. Tigers 44–0. Drive: 5 plays, 65 yards, 2:04.
- LSU – Noah Cain 2-yard run (Damian Ramos kick), 1:06. Tigers 51–0. Drive: 6 plays, 80 yards, 1:28.

Third quarter

- LSU – Armoni Goodwin 2-yard run (Damian Ramos kick), 8:42. Tigers 58–0. Drive: 8 plays, 59 yards, 3:26.
- SOU – Benny McCray 94-yard interception return (Luke Jackson kick), 3:45. Tigers 58–7.

Fourth quarter

- LSU – Armoni Goodwin 1-yard run (Damian Ramos kick), 14:01. Tigers 65–7. Drive: 10 plays, 75 yards, 4:44.
- SOU – Karl Ligon 1-yard run (Luke Jackson kick), 8:15. Tigers 65–14. Drive: 11 plays, 79 yards, 5:35.
- SOU – Luke Jackson 29-yard field goal, 0:00. Tigers 65–17. Drive: 8 plays, 59 yards, 3:25.

Top passers

- SOU – Besean McCray – 9/16, 61 yards, INT
- LSU – Garrett Nussmeier – 13/23, 183 yards, 2 INT

Top rushers

- SOU – Jerrod Sims – 15 rushes, 79 yards
- LSU – Armoni Goodwin – 12 rushes, 85 yards, TD

Top receivers

- SOU – Cornelius Dyson – 1 reception, 29 yards
- LSU – Malik Nabers – 3 receptions, 81 yards, TD

=== Vs. Texas Southern ===
	1	2	3	4	Total
Jaguars	0	0	0	0	0
TxSt Tigers	14	7	0	3	24

=== Arkansas–Pine Bluff ===
	1	2	3	4	Total
Golden Lions	3	0	0	0	3
Jaguars	7	35	14	3	59

=== At Prairie View A&M ===
	1	2	3	4	Total
Jaguars	7	3	14	21	45
Panthers	10	3	0	0	13

=== Alcorn State ===
	1	2	3	4	Total
Braves	0	14	0	3	17
Jaguars	7	14	0	0	21

=== Virginia–Lynchburg ===
	1	2	3	4	Total
Dragons	0	7	0	0	7
Jaguars	10	14	20	7	51

=== At No. 9 Jackson State ===
	1	2	3	4	Total
Jaguars	0	0	0	0	0
No. 9 JSU Tigers	0	22	6	7	35

=== At Florida A&M ===
	1	2	3	4	Total
Jaguars	3	6	7	0	16
Rattlers	7	10	10	3	30

=== Mississippi Valley State ===
	1	2	3	4	Total
Delta Devils	0	0	7	0	7
Jaguars	7	13	7	0	27

=== Vs. Grambling State ===
	1	2	3	4	Total
GSU Tigers	7	3	7	0	17
Jaguars	0	14	0	20	34

=== At No. 10 Jackson State (SWAC Championship) ===
	1	2	3	4	Total
Jaguars	0	10	14	0	24
No. 10 JSU Tigers	26	7	10	0	43
