= 2022 Bethune–Cookman Wildcats football team =

American college football season

2022 Bethune–Cookman Wildcats football
- Conference: Southwestern Athletic Conference
- East Division
- Record: 2–9 (2–6 SWAC)
- Head coach: Terry Sims (7th season)
- Offensive coordinator: Mike Canales (1st season)
- Defensive coordinator: Darrin Hayes (1st season)
- Home stadium: Daytona Stadium

2022 Southwestern Athletic Conference football standings
	Conf.			Overall
Team	W		L	W		L
East Division
No. 16 Jackson State xy$	8	–	0	12	–	1
Florida A&M	7	–	1	9	–	2
Alabama State	4	–	4	6	–	5
Alabama A&M	4	–	4	4	–	7
Bethune–Cookman	2	–	6	2	–	9
Mississippi Valley State	2	–	6	2	–	9
West Division
Southern xy	5	–	3	7	–	5
Prairie View A&M x	5	–	3	6	–	5
Alcorn State	4	–	4	5	–	6
Texas Southern	4	–	4	5	–	6
Grambling State	2	–	6	3	–	8
Arkansas–Pine Bluff	1	–	7	3	–	8
Championship: Jackson State 43, Southern 24
$ – Conference champion; x – Division champion/co-champions; y – Championship game participant; Rankings from STATS Poll

The 2022 Bethune–Cookman Wildcats football team represented Bethune–Cookman University as a member of the East Division of the Southwestern Athletic Conference (SWAC) during the 2022 NCAA Division I FCS football season. The Wildcats were led by seventh-year head coach Terry Sims and played their home games at Daytona Stadium in Daytona Beach, Florida.

== Schedule ==
Date	Time	Opponent	Site	TV	Result	Attendance
September 3	3:30 p.m.	at No. 16 (FBS) Miami (FL)*	Hard Rock Stadium; Miami Gardens, FL	ACCN	L 13–70	56,795
September 10	4:00 p.m.	South Carolina State*	Daytona Stadium; Dayton Beach, FL	ESPN+	L 9–33	6,071
September 24	4:00 p.m.	Grambling State	Daytona Stadium; Dayton Beach, FL	ESPN+	W 36–19	6,343
October 1	3:00 p.m.	at Alabama A&M	Louis Crews Stadium; Huntsville, AL		L 27–35	18,750
October 8	6:00 p.m.	at Tennessee State*	Nissan Stadium; Nashville, TN	ESPN+	L 17–41	22,231
October 15	4:00 p.m.	No. 8т Jackson State	TIAA Bank Field; Jacksonville, FL	ESPN+	L 8–48	22,373
October 22	4:00 p.m.	at Mississippi Valley State	Rice–Totten Stadium; Itta Bena, MS	HBCU Go	W 45–35	3,909
October 29	3:00 p.m.	at Prairie View A&M	Panther Stadium at Blackshear Field; Prairie View, TX		L 48–58	14,599
November 5	4:00 p.m.	Alabama State^{†}	Daytona Stadium; Dayton Beach, FL	HBCU Go	L 22–37	7,729
November 12	3:00 p.m.	at Alcorn State	Casem-Spinks Stadium; Lorman, MS	HBCU Go	L 14–17	
November 19	2:30 p.m.	vs. Florida A&M	Camping World Stadium; Orlando, FL (Florida Classic)	ESPNU	L 20–41	
*Non-conference game; ^{†}Homecoming; Rankings from STATS Poll released prior to the game; All times are in Eastern time

== Game summaries ==
=== At No. 16 (FBS) Miami (FL) ===
Game One – Bethune–Cookman Wildcats (0–0) at #16 Miami Hurricanes (0–0)

Quarter	1	2	3	4	Total
Wildcats	3	7	3	0	13
No. 16 (FBS) Hurricanes	14	28	14	14	70

at Hard Rock Stadium • Miami Gardens, Florida

- Date: Saturday, September 3, 2022
- Game time: 3:30 p.m. EST
- Game weather: Sunny • Temperature: 91 °F (33 °C)
- TV announcers (ACCN): Jorge Sedano (play-by-play), Forrest Conoly (analyst), & Marilyn Payne (sideline)

Game information

First quarter

- (8:54) BCU – Dylan Moghaddam 29-yard field goal (Drive: 10 plays, 63 yards, 6:06; Bethune-Cookman 3–0)
- (7:00) MIA – Thaddius Franklin Jr. 4-yard run, Andres Borregales kick (Drive: 5 plays, 30 yards, 1:54; Miami 7–3)
- (0:36) MIA – Henry Parrish Jr. 5-yard run, Andres Borregales kick (Drive: 11 plays, 61 yards, 4:56; Miami 14–3)

Second quarter

- (12:06) MIA – Henry Parrish Jr. 6-yard run, Andres Borregales kick (Drive: 4 plays, 85 yards, 1:23; Miami 21–3)
- (11:50) MIA – Tyrone Franklin Jr. 30-yard interception return, Andres Borregales kick (Miami 28–3)
- (6:34) BCU – Que'shaun Byrd 34-yard pass from Jalon Jones, Dylan Moghaddam kick (Drive: 9 plays, 75 yards, 5:16; Miami 28–10)
- (4:19) MIA – Xavier Restrepo 16-yard pass from Tyler Van Dyke, Andres Borregales kick (Drive: 5 plays, 54 yards, 2:15; Miami 35–10)
- (0:39) MIA – Henry Parrish Jr. 5-yard run, Andres Borregales kick (Drive: 5 plays, 51 yards, 1:10; Miami 42–10)

Third quarter

- (10:30) BCU – Dylan Moghaddam 21-yard field goal, (Drive: 9 plays, 90 yards, 2:43; Miami 42–13)
- (7:26) MIA – Michael Redding III 16-yard pass from Tyler Van Dyke, Andres Borregales kick (Drive: 7 plays, 73 yards, 3:04; Miami 49–13)
- (2:42) MIA – Thaddius Franklin Jr. 4-yard run, Andres Borregales kick (Drive: 7 plays, 81 yards, 3:23; Miami 56–13)

Fourth quarter

- (14:55) MIA – Devon Perry 4-yard run, Andres Borregales kick (Drive: 3 plays, 23 yards, 0:47; Miami 63–13)
- (6:48) MIA – Terrell Walden II 2-yard run, Andres Borregales kick (Drive: 10 plays, 48 yards, 6:15; Miami 70–13)

Statistics	BCU	MIA
First downs	13	29
Plays–yards	56–342	65–581
Rushes–yards	29–93	42–300
Passing yards	249	281
Passing: comp–att–int	14–27–3	20–23–0
Time of possession	28:39	26:54

Team	Category	Player	Statistics
Bethune-Cookman	Passing	Jalon Jones	13/20, 243 yards, TD, INT
Bethune-Cookman	Rushing	Tyrone Franklin Jr.	4 carries, 30 yards
Bethune-Cookman	Receiving	Dylaan Lee	5 receptions, 83 yards
Miami	Passing	Tyler Van Dyke	13/16, 193 yards, 2 TD
Miami	Rushing	Henry Parrish Jr.	14 carries, 108 yards, 3 TD
Miami	Receiving	Xavier Restrepo	5 receptions, 100 yards, TD

=== South Carolina State ===
	1	2	3	4	Total
SCSU Bulldogs	7	3	10	13	33
Wildcats	0	0	3	6	9

=== Grambling State ===
	1	2	3	4	Total
Tigers	10	9	0	0	19
Wildcats	14	3	3	16	36

=== At Alabama A&M ===
	1	2	3	4	Total
Wildcats	0	14	6	7	27
ALAM Bulldogs	7	7	14	7	35

=== At Tennessee State ===
	1	2	3	4	Total
Wildcats	3	0	7	7	17
TSU Tigers	7	24	3	7	41

=== No. 8т Jackson State ===
	1	2	3	4	Total
No. 8т JSU Tigers	21	9	9	9	48
Wildcats	0	0	0	8	8

=== At Mississippi Valley State ===
	1	2	3	4	Total
Wildcats	6	15	17	7	45
Delta Devils	7	0	21	7	35

=== At Prairie View A&M ===
	1	2	3	4	Total
Wildcats	21	14	7	6	48
Panthers	7	14	13	21	55

=== Alabama State ===
	1	2	3	4	Total
Hornets	7	3	17	10	37
Wildcats	9	7	6	0	22

=== At Alcorn State ===
	1	2	3	4	Total
Wildcats	0	0	7	7	14
Braves	0	10	0	7	17

=== Vs. Florida A&M ===
	1	2	3	4	Total
Rattlers	13	14	0	14	41
Wildcats	0	7	7	6	20
