= 2022 Grambling State Tigers football team =

American college football season

2022 Grambling State Tigers football
- Conference: Southwestern Athletic Conference
- West Division
- Record: 3–8 (2–6 SWAC)
- Head coach: Hue Jackson (1st season)
- Offensive coordinator: John Simon (1st season)
- Defensive coordinator: Cedric Thornton (1st season)
- Home stadium: Eddie Robinson Stadium

2022 Southwestern Athletic Conference football standings
| | Conf. | | | Overall |
| Team | W | | L | W | | L |
|---|---|---|---|---|---|---|
East Division
| No. 16 Jackson State xy$ | 8 | – | 0 | 12 | – | 1 |
| Florida A&M | 7 | – | 1 | 9 | – | 2 |
| Alabama State | 4 | – | 4 | 6 | – | 5 |
| Alabama A&M | 4 | – | 4 | 4 | – | 7 |
| Bethune–Cookman | 2 | – | 6 | 2 | – | 9 |
| Mississippi Valley State | 2 | – | 6 | 2 | – | 9 |
West Division
| Southern xy | 5 | – | 3 | 7 | – | 5 |
| Prairie View A&M x | 5 | – | 3 | 6 | – | 5 |
| Alcorn State | 4 | – | 4 | 5 | – | 6 |
| Texas Southern | 4 | – | 4 | 5 | – | 6 |
| Grambling State | 2 | – | 6 | 3 | – | 8 |
| Arkansas–Pine Bluff | 1 | – | 7 | 3 | – | 8 |
Championship: Jackson State 43, Southern 24
$ – Conference champion; x – Division champion/co-champions; y – Championship game participant; Rankings from STATS Poll

The 2022 Grambling State Tigers football team represented Grambling State University as a member of the Southwestern Athletic Conference (SWAC) during the 2022 NCAA Division I FCS football season. They were led by head coach Hue Jackson, who coached his first season with the program. The Tigers played their home games at Eddie Robinson Stadium in Grambling, Louisiana.

== Schedule ==
Grambling State finalized their 2022 schedule on January 26, 2022.

| Date | Time | Opponent | Site | TV | Result | Attendance |
|---|---|---|---|---|---|---|
| September 3 | 6:00 p.m. | at Arkansas State* | Centennial Bank Stadium; Jonesboro, AR | ESPN3 | L 3–58 | 17,893 |
| September 10 | 6:00 p.m. | vs. Northwestern State* | Independence Stadium; Shreveport, LA | | W 47–21 | 12,591 |
| September 17 | 1:00 p.m. | at No. 11 Jackson State* | Mississippi Veterans Memorial Stadium; Jackson, MS | | L 24–66 | 34,451 |
| September 24 | 3:00 p.m. | at Bethune–Cookman | Daytona Stadium; Daytona Beach, FL | | L 19–36 | 6,343 |
| October 1 | 4:00 p.m. | vs. Prairie View A&M | Cotton Bowl; Dallas, TX (State Fair Classic) | HBCU Go | L 14–34 | 53,971 |
| October 8 | 1:00 p.m. | at Alabama A&M | Louis Crews Stadium; Huntsville, AL | HBCU Go | L 31–37 ^{2OT} | 5,150 |
| October 15 | 2:00 p.m. | Florida A&M | Eddie Robinson Stadium; Grambling, LA | HBCU Go | L 16–20 | 7,195 |
| October 29 | 2:00 p.m. | Alcorn State | Eddie Robinson Stadium; Grambling, LA | | W 35–6 | 8,579 |
| November 5 | 2:00 p.m. | Arkansas–Pine Bluff^{†} | Eddie Robinson Stadium; Grambling, LA | | W 36–10 | 13,589 |
| November 12 | 6:00 p.m. | at Texas Southern | PNC Stadium; Houston, TX | | L 7–41 | |
| November 26 | 1:00 p.m. | vs. Southern | Caesars Superdome; New Orleans, LA (Bayou Classic) | NBC | L 17–34 | |
*Non-conference game; ^{†}Homecoming; Rankings from STATS Poll released prior to the game; All times are in Central time
