= 2022 Mississippi Valley State Delta Devils football team =

American college football season

2022 Mississippi Valley State Delta Devils football
- Conference: Southwestern Athletic Conference
- East Division
- Record: 2–9 (2–6 SWAC)
- Head coach: Vincent Dancy (5th season)
- Offensive coordinator: Kenton Evans (1st season)
- Defensive coordinator: Javier Gonzalez (1st season)
- Home stadium: Rice–Totten Stadium

2022 Southwestern Athletic Conference football standings
	Conf.			Overall
Team	W		L	W		L
East Division
No. 16 Jackson State xy$	8	–	0	12	–	1
Florida A&M	7	–	1	9	–	2
Alabama State	4	–	4	6	–	5
Alabama A&M	4	–	4	4	–	7
Bethune–Cookman	2	–	6	2	–	9
Mississippi Valley State	2	–	6	2	–	9
West Division
Southern xy	5	–	3	7	–	5
Prairie View A&M x	5	–	3	6	–	5
Alcorn State	4	–	4	5	–	6
Texas Southern	4	–	4	5	–	6
Grambling State	2	–	6	3	–	8
Arkansas–Pine Bluff	1	–	7	3	–	8
Championship: Jackson State 43, Southern 24
$ – Conference champion; x – Division champion/co-champions; y – Championship game participant; Rankings from STATS Poll

The 2022 Mississippi Valley State Delta Devils football team represented Mississippi Valley State University as a member of the East Division of the Southwestern Athletic Conference (SWAC) during the 2022 NCAA Division I FCS football season. Led by Vincent Dancy in his fifth and final season as head coach, the Delta Devils compiled an overall record of 2–9 and a mark of 2–6 in conference play, tying for fifth place in the SWAC's East Division. Mississippi Valley State played home games at Rice–Totten Stadium in Itta Bena, Mississippi.

== Schedule ==
Date	Time	Opponent	Site	TV	Result	Attendance
September 1	7:00 p.m.	at Tarleton State*	Memorial Stadium; Stephenville, TX	ESPN+	L 13–29	10,127
September 10	3:00 p.m.	at Austin Peay*	Fortera Stadium; Clarksville, TN	ESPN+	L 0–41	4,516
September 17	6:00 p.m.	Delta State*	Rice–Totten Stadium; Itta Bena, MS	YouTube	L 17–28	3,208
September 24	3:00 p.m.	at No. 11 Jackson State	Mississippi Veterans Memorial Stadium; Jackson, MS	ESPN+	L 7–49	28,265
October 1	5:00 p.m.	at Florida A&M	Bragg Memorial Stadium; Tallahassee, FL		L 7–34	10,699
October 8	6:00 p.m.	Alcorn State	Rice–Totten Stadium; Itta Bena, MS	YouTube	L 7–30	6,700
October 15	2:00 p.m.	at Alabama State	New ASU Stadium; Montgomery, AL		L 9–24	10,123
October 22	3:00 p.m.	Bethune–Cookman^{†}	Rice–Totten Stadium; Itta Bena, MS	HBCU Go	L 35–45	3,909
November 3	6:30 p.m.	Alabama A&M	Rice–Totten Stadium; Itta Bena, MS	ESPNU	W 30–20	2,341
November 12	6:00 p.m.	at Southern	A. W. Mumford Stadium; Baton Rouge, LA	ESPN+	L 7–27	17,776
November 19	1:00 p.m.	Prairie View A&M	Rice–Totten Stadium; Itta Bena, MS	YouTube	W 27–7	3,097
*Non-conference game; ^{†}Homecoming; Rankings from STATS Poll released prior to the game; All times are in Central time

== Games summaries ==
=== At Tarleton State ===
	1	2	3	4	Total
Delta Devils	0	0	7	6	13
Texans	7	9	3	10	29

=== At Austin Peay ===
	1	2	3	4	Total
Delta Devils	0	0	0	0	0
Governors	21	20	0	0	41

=== Delta State ===
	1	2	3	4	Total
Statesman	5	13	7	3	28
Delta Devils	0	0	10	7	17

=== No. 11 Jackson State ===
	1	2	3	4	Total
Delta Devils	7	0	0	0	7
No. 11 JSU Tigers	14	7	21	7	49

=== At Florida A&M ===
	1	2	3	4	Total
Delta Devils	7	0	0	0	7
Rattlers	7	7	10	10	34

=== Alcorn State ===
	1	2	3	4	Total
Braves	7	7	0	16	30
Delta Devils	0	7	0	0	7

=== At Alabama State ===
	1	2	3	4	Total
Delta Devils	0	3	0	6	9
Hornets	7	10	0	7	24

=== Bethune–Cookman ===
	1	2	3	4	Total
Wildcats	6	15	17	7	45
Delta Devils	7	0	21	7	35

=== Alabama A&M ===
	1	2	3	4	Total
A&M Bulldogs	0	7	7	6	20
Delta Devils	7	10	13	0	30

=== At Southern ===
	1	2	3	4	Total
Delta Devils	0	0	7	0	7
Jaguars	7	13	7	0	27

=== Prairie View A&M ===
	1	2	3	4	Total
Panthers	7	0	0	0	7
Delta Devils	0	0	17	10	27
