= Travis Hunter =

American football player (born 2003)

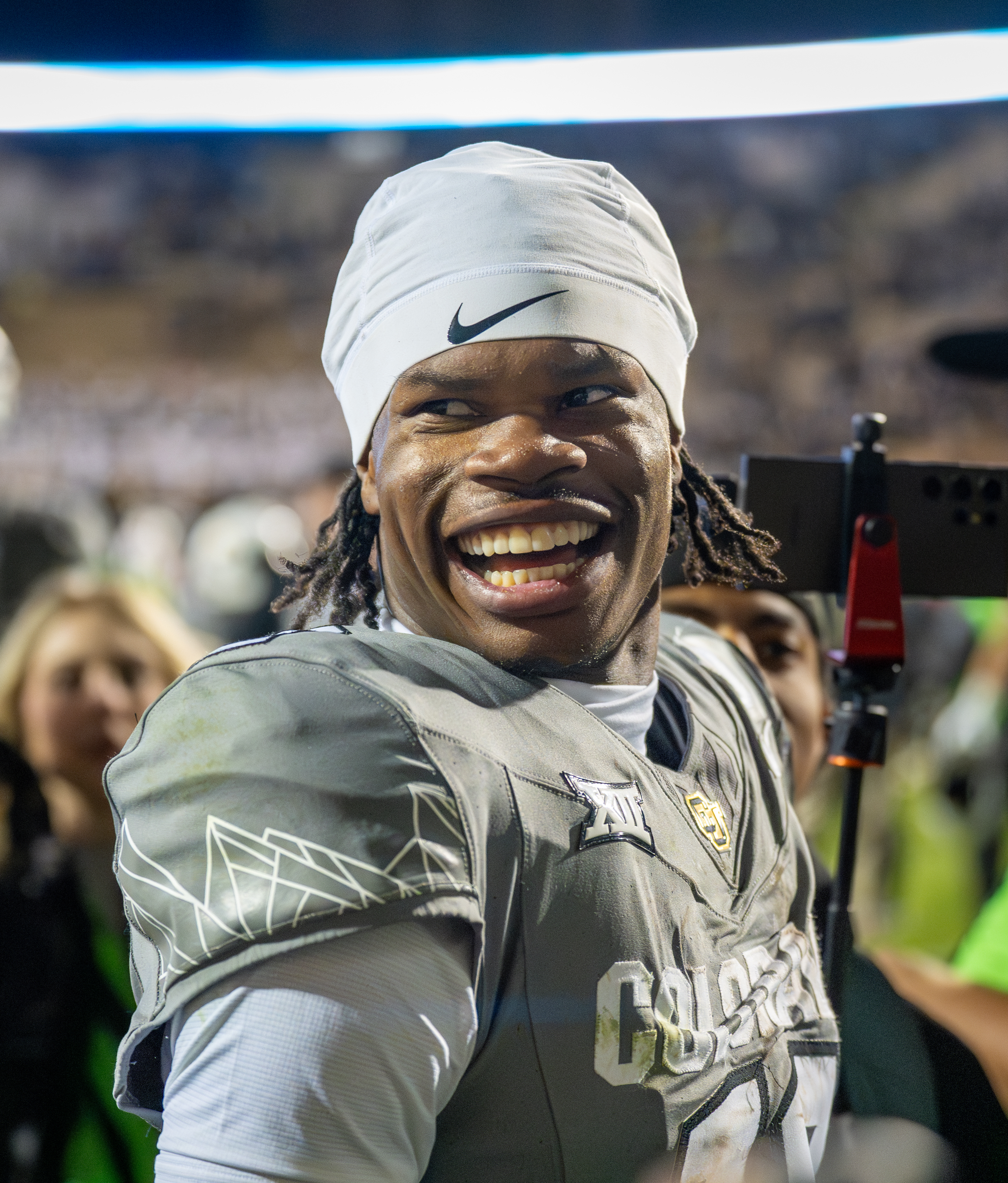
- Hunter with the Colorado Buffaloes in 2024

No. 12 – Jacksonville Jaguars
- Positions: Cornerback, Wide receiver
- Roster status: Active

Personal information
- Born: May 18, 2003 (age 23); West Palm Beach, Florida, U.S.
- Listed height: 6 ft 1 in (1.85 m)
- Listed weight: 185 lb (84 kg)

Career information
- High school: Collins Hill (Suwanee, Georgia)
- College: Jackson State (2022); Colorado (2023–2024)
- NFL draft: 2025: 1st round, 2nd overall pick

Career history
- Jacksonville Jaguars (2025–present)

Awards and highlights
- Heisman Trophy (2024); Fred Biletnikoff Award (2024); Chuck Bednarik Award (2024); Colorado Buffaloes No. 12 retired

Career NFL statistics as of Week 10, 2026
- Tackles: 51
- Pass deflections: 10
- Interceptions: 3
- Receptions: 37
- Receiving yards: 389
- Receiving touchdowns: 2
- Stats at Pro Football Reference

Travis Hunter Jr. (born May 18, 2003) is an American professional football cornerback and wide receiver for the Jacksonville Jaguars of the National Football League (NFL). He played college football for the Jackson State Tigers and Colorado Buffaloes, winning the Heisman Trophy with the latter in 2024. Known for his two-way playing ability, Hunter is the only player in college football history to win both the Chuck Bednarik and Fred Biletnikoff Awards. He was selected by the Jaguars second overall in the 2025 NFL draft.

== Early life ==
Hunter was born on May 18, 2003, in West Palm Beach, Florida where he was raised until later moving to Atlanta, Georgia near the end of his eighth grade year. He would live with Frontia Fountain, an assistant football coach at Collins Hill High School in Suwanee, Georgia, for two years while playing cornerback and wide receiver for the Collins Hill Eagles. As a sophomore, Hunter led Gwinnett County with seven interceptions, also recording 49 receptions for 919 yards and 12 touchdowns on offense. As a junior, Hunter had eight interceptions and 51 tackles, in addition to catching 137 passes for 1,746 yards and 24 touchdowns. He earned the MaxPreps Georgia Player of the Year award. He also set Gwinnett County single-season records in receptions, receiving yards and receiving touchdowns, leading the Eagles to a 12–3 record and an appearance in the Class 7A state championship game.

As a senior, Hunter recorded 76 receptions for 1,128 yards and 10 touchdowns on offense, and 23 tackles, four interceptions and a forced fumble on defense, despite missing five games due to an ankle injury. In the state championship game, Hunter had 10 catches for 153 yards and a touchdown, as well as a forced fumble to cap off a perfect 15–0 record and Collins Hill's first state title in school history. In his final high school game, Hunter had 10 catches for 178 yards and two touchdowns in a 40–36 defeat to Washington state champions Graham-Kapowsin in the GEICO State Championship Bowl Series. He also broke the Georgia state record in career receiving touchdowns with 48, previously held by Braxton Hicks. Hunter played in the 2022 Polynesian Bowl, where he won the offensive MVP honors after recording five receptions for 54 yards.

== College career ==
College recruiting
Name	Hometown	School	Height	Weight	Commit date
Travis Hunter; WR/DB	Suwanee, Georgia	Collins Hill	6 ft 1 in (1.85 m)	165 lb (75 kg)	Dec 15, 2021
Travis Hunter; WR/DB	Recruit ratings: Rivals: 247Sports: ESPN:				

Hunter was considered the number one overall ranked recruit by 247Sports and Rivals, as well as number two by ESPN (behind Walter Nolen). After receiving a scholarship from Florida State, he committed to the Seminoles on March 3, 2020 (one day after making his first visit to the school). On December 15, 2021, Hunter flipped his commitment to the Jackson State Tigers coached by Deion Sanders. Hunter became the first five-star recruit to sign with an HBCU or FCS school, with the move being cited among the most surprising signings in college football recruiting history.

=== Jackson State (2022) ===
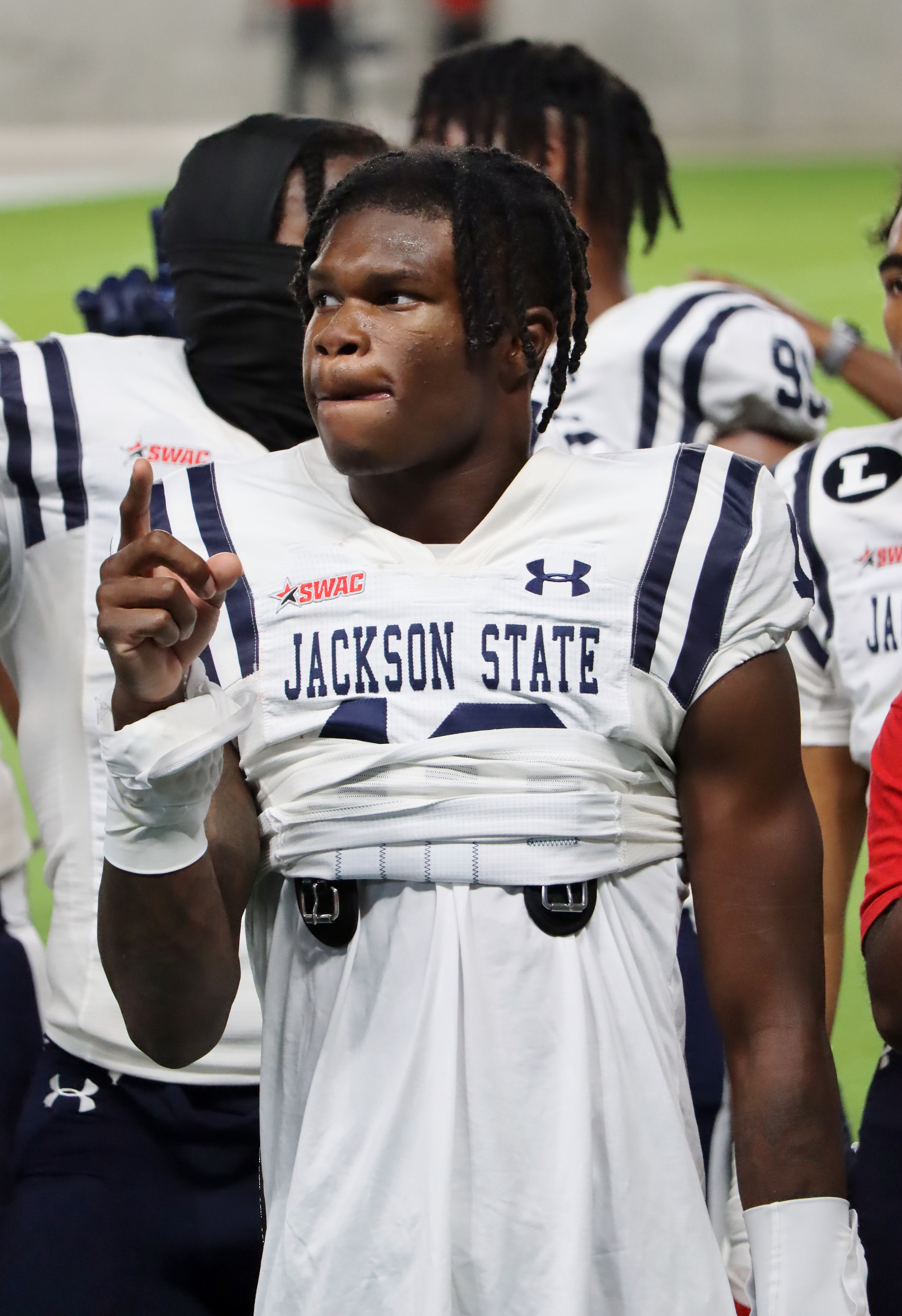
Hunter with the Jackson State Tigers in 2022

Hunter recorded two receiving touchdowns and two interceptions in the Jackson State spring game, which was the first HBCU spring game to ever be nationally televised. Hunter made his collegiate debut in week 1 against Florida A&M, but did not record any statistics. In the win, Hunter sustained an undisclosed injury that kept him out five games. Hunter returned in week 7 victory against Campbell where he had four receptions for 24 yards. In week 10, Hunter recorded his first collegiate touchdown as well as his first interception against Alabama A&M. In week 11, Hunter had two receptions for a season high 49 yards and one touchdown against Alcorn State. He also recorded an interception for the second consecutive week. In the 2022 Celebration Bowl, Hunter had four receptions for 47 yards and two touchdowns. As a freshman, Hunter accumulated 19 total tackles, eight pass breakups, two interceptions, one fumble recovery and one defensive touchdown in seven games played. On offense, he added 18 receptions for 188 yards and four touchdowns.

=== Colorado (2023–2024) ===
Hunter transferred to the University of Colorado Boulder in 2023, following Jackson State head coach Deion Sanders. In his FBS debut, Hunter played 147 total snaps across offense and defense in a 45–42 upset win over TCU. In the win, Hunter had 11 receptions for 119 yards and three tackles with an interception on defense. In week 3, Hunter sustained an injury during Colorado's overtime victory over rival Colorado State, which sidelined him for the next three games. Hunter returned from injury week 7 against Stanford where he hauled in a season high 13 catches for 140 yards and two touchdowns. In week 8, Hunter caught two interceptions against number 23 ranked UCLA. In week 9, Hunter had eight catches for 98 yards and a score against number 16 ranked Oregon State. In week 11, Hunter had four receptions for 82 yards and one touchdown against Washington State. In the season finale, Hunter caught eight passes for 107 yards and a touchdown against Utah. On the season, Hunter hauled in 57 receptions for 721 yards and five touchdowns. On defense, he recorded three interceptions and 30 tackles. He totaled 1,036 snaps including 437 on offense, 568 on defense and 31 on special teams, averaging 115.1 per game. He was named a 2023 Consensus All-American and second-team All-PAC-12. Hunter was also named recipient of the Paul Hornung Award.

To open the 2024 season, Hunter had seven receptions for 132 yards and three touchdowns in the win over North Dakota State. In the September 7 game, Colorado was beaten 28–10 by Nebraska. Hunter significantly impacted the offense with 10 catches for 110 yards, but he faced criticism for his lack of effort on the Cornhuskers' first score of the game. In the September 21 game against Baylor, Hunter made the game-winning forced fumble at the goal line in a 38–31 overtime thriller. After finishing the regular season playing nearly 1,400 scrimmage snaps on offense and defense, 382 more than any other player in the country, Hunter won the Heisman Trophy. He was the Colorado Buffaloes second-ever Heisman winner, the first being Rashaan Salaam in 1994. He was also only the second-ever defensive player from the two-platoon system era to win the award, following Charles Woodson in 1997. In addition, Hunter was the first player in college football history to win both the Chuck Bednarik Award, as the nation's top defensive player, and the Fred Biletnikoff Award, as the nation's best wide receiver.

In April 2025, the University of Colorado retired Hunter’s No. 12 jersey during its spring game.

=== Statistics ===
College statistics
Year	Team	Games		Receiving				Rushing				Tackles					Interceptions					Fumbles		
Year	Team	GP	GS	Rec	Yds	Avg	TD	Att	Yds	Avg	TD	Solo	Ast	Cmb	TfL	Sck	Int	Yds	Avg	TD	PD	FR	FF	TD
2022	Jackson State	8	8	18	188	10.4	4	1	−10	−10.0	0	15	4	19	0.0	0.0	2	44	22.0	1	8	1	0	0
2023	Colorado	9	9	57	721	12.6	5	0	0	0.0	0	22	8	30	2.0	0.0	3	−10	−3.3	0	5	0	0	0
2024	Colorado	13	13	96	1,258	13.1	15	2	5	2.5	1	25	11	36	1.0	0.0	4	65	16.3	0	11	0	1	0
Career		30	30	171	2,167	12.4	24	3	-5	-1.6	1	58	23	80	3.0	0.0	9	93	11.6	1	22	1	1	0

== Professional career ==
Pre-draft measurables
Height	Weight	Arm length	Hand span	Wingspan
6 ft 0 3/8 in (1.84 m)	188 lb (85 kg)	31 3/8 in (0.80 m)	9 1/8 in (0.23 m)	6 ft 4 7/8 in (1.95 m)
All values from NFL Combine

=== 2025 ===
Hunter was selected second overall in the 2025 NFL draft by the Jacksonville Jaguars in a trade involving the Cleveland Browns.

In Week 7 against the Los Angeles Rams at Wembley Stadium, he scored his first NFL career touchdown on a 34-yard pass from Trevor Lawrence and finished the game with 8 receptions for 101 yards in the 35–7 loss. On October 30, Hunter suffered a knee injury during practice and was placed on injured reserve the following day, with head coach Liam Coen announcing that he would miss up to four weeks. On November 11, the Jaguars announced that Hunter had undergone successful surgery to repair a torn lateral collateral ligament in his right knee and ruled him out for the rest of the season. In his rookie season, Hunter played in seven games before his injury. On offense, he recorded 28 receptions for 298 yards and one touchdown. On defense, he recorded 15 tackles and three pass deflections.

== Career statistics ==
Legend
**Bold**	Career high

General				Offense							Defense													
Year	Team	Games		Receiving					Fumbles		Tackles					Interceptions						Fumbles		
Year	Team	GP	GS	Rec	Yds	Avg	Lng	TD	Fum	Lost	Cmb	Solo	Ast	Sck	TFL	PD	Int	Yds	Avg	Lng	TD	FF	FR	TD
2025	JAX	7	4	**28**	**298**	10.6	**44**	**1**	**1**	0	15	11	4	0.0	0	3	0	0	0.0	0	0	0	0	0
2026	JAX	9	9	9	91	**10.1**	26	**1**	0	0	**36**	**24**	**12**	0.0	0	**7**	**3**	0	0.0	0	0	0	0	0
Career		16	13	37	389	10.5	44	2	1	0	51	35	16	0.0	0	10	3	0	0.0	0	0	0	0	0

== Awards and highlights ==
=== College ===
Awards and honors

- #12 retired by Colorado (2025)
- Heisman Trophy (2024)
- Walter Camp Award (2024)
- AP College Football Player of the Year (2024)
- SN College Football Player of the Year (2024)
- Fred Biletnikoff Award (2024)
- Chuck Bednarik Award (2024)
- Lott Trophy (2024)
- Academic FBS All-American of the Year (2024)
- 2× Paul Hornung Award (2023, 2024)
- Unanimous All-American (2024) (Note: Selected on offense, defense, and all-purpose)
- Consensus All-American (2023)
- 2× Academic All-American (2023, 2024)
- Big 12 Defensive Player of the Year (2024)
- SWAC Freshman of the Year (2022)
- 2× first-team All-Big 12 (2024) (Note: Selected on offense and defense)
- First-team All-Pac-12 (2023) (Note: Selected on defense)
- Second-team All-Pac-12 (2023) (Note: Selected as all-purpose / special teams)
- Second-team All-SWAC (2022)
- 3× Pac-12 / Big 12 Player of the Week:
  - Offensive (2024)
  - Defensive (2023, 2024)

== Personal life ==
Hunter's father, Travis Hunter Sr., starred on the football and track teams at Boynton Beach Community High School. He went on to play semipro football in the Florida Football Alliance and the Southern States Football League, winning the latter's Offensive Rookie of the Year award in 2007. Hunter is a Christian and was baptized in October 2025.

He married Leanna Lenee in May 2025. Hunter has a Twitch channel and shares a YouTube channel with Leanna. Together they have a son, born on August 27, 2025.

Hunter Jr. had NIL deals in college with Greenwood and several of Michael Strahan's brands. Hunter was one of the cover athletes for EA Sports College Football 25 along with Donovan Edwards and Quinn Ewers.
