= 2022 Alabama A&M Bulldogs football team =

American college football season

2022 Alabama A&M Bulldogs football
- Conference: Southwestern Athletic Conference
- East Division
- Record: 4–7 (4–4 SWAC)
- Head coach: Connell Maynor (5th season)
- Offensive coordinator: Duane Taylor (5th season)
- Defensive coordinator: Kienus Boulware (1st season)
- Home stadium: Louis Crews Stadium

2022 Southwestern Athletic Conference football standings
	Conf.			Overall
Team	W		L	W		L
East Division
No. 16 Jackson State xy$	8	–	0	12	–	1
Florida A&M	7	–	1	9	–	2
Alabama State	4	–	4	6	–	5
Alabama A&M	4	–	4	4	–	7
Bethune–Cookman	2	–	6	2	–	9
Mississippi Valley State	2	–	6	2	–	9
West Division
Southern xy	5	–	3	7	–	5
Prairie View A&M x	5	–	3	6	–	5
Alcorn State	4	–	4	5	–	6
Texas Southern	4	–	4	5	–	6
Grambling State	2	–	6	3	–	8
Arkansas–Pine Bluff	1	–	7	3	–	8
Championship: Jackson State 43, Southern 24
$ – Conference champion; x – Division champion/co-champions; y – Championship game participant; Rankings from STATS Poll

The 2022 Alabama A&M Bulldogs football team represented Alabama A&M University as a member of the East Division of the Southwestern Athletic Conference (SWAC) during the 2022 NCAA Division I FCS football season. Led by fifth-year head coach Connell Maynor, the Bulldogs played their home games at Louis Crews Stadium in Huntsville, Alabama.

== Schedule ==
Date	Time	Opponent	Site	TV	Result	Attendance
September 1	7:00 p.m.	at UAB*	Protective Stadium; Birmingham, AL	CBSSN	L 0–59	32,542
September 10	6:00 p.m.	at Troy*	Veterans Memorial Stadium; Troy, AL	ESPN3	L 17–38	26,189
September 17	2:00 p.m.	Austin Peay*	Louis Crews Stadium; Huntsville, AL (Louis Crews Classic)		L 3–28	7,150
September 24	5:00 p.m.	at Florida A&M	Bragg Memorial Stadium; Tallahassee, FL	ESPN+	L 25–38	7,595
October 1	2:00 p.m.	Bethune–Cookman^{†}	Louis Crew Stadium; Huntsville, AL		W 35–27	18,750
October 8	1:00 p.m.	Grambling State	Louis Crew Stadium; Huntsville, AL	HBCU Go	W 37–31 ^{2OT}	5,150
October 16	3:00 p.m.	Arkansas–Pine Bluff	Simmons Bank Field; Pine Bluff, AR (Note: The game against Arkansas–Pine Bluff was originally scheduled to be played as part of the St. Louis River City HBCU Football Classic at The Dome at America's Center in St. Louis, but the classic was cancelled and the game was moved to Pine Bluff on October 12.)		W 34–31	4,172
October 29	2:30 p.m.	vs. Alabama State	Legion Field; Birmingham, AL (Magic City Classic)	ESPN Networks	L 17–24	67,532
November 3	6:30 p.m.	at Mississippi Valley State	Rice–Totten Stadium; Itta Bena, MS	ESPNU	L 20–30	2,341
November 12	4:00 p.m.	vs. No. 9 Jackson State	Ladd–Peebles Stadium; Mobile, AL (Gulf Coast Challenge)	ESPN+	L 13–27	32,300
November 19	1:00 p.m.	Texas Southern	Louis Crew Stadium; Huntsville, AL	HBCU Go	W 24–20	1,397
*Non-conference game; ^{†}Homecoming; Rankings from STATS Poll released prior to the game; All times are in Central time

== Game summaries ==
=== At UAB ===
	1	2	3	4	Total
A&M Bulldogs	0	0	0	0	0
Blazers	28	10	21	0	59

Statistics	AAMU	UAB
First downs	15	25
Total yards	235	478
Rushing yards	98	231
Passing yards	137	247
Turnovers	4	1
Time of possession	30:00	30:00

Team	Category	Player	Statistics
Alabama A&M	Passing	Xavier Lankford	12/22, 115 yards, INT
Alabama A&M	Rushing	Xavier Lankford	10 rushes, 42 yards
Alabama A&M	Receiving	Isiah Cox	2 receptions, 54 yards
UAB	Passing	Dylan Hopkins	13/18, 191 yards, TD
UAB	Rushing	Jermaine Brown Jr.	10 rushes, 114 yards, TD
UAB	Receiving	Tejhaun Palmer	4 receptions, 57 yards

=== At Troy ===
	1	2	3	4	Total
A&M Bulldogs	3	0	0	14	17
Trojans	0	7	21	10	38

=== Austin Peay ===
	1	2	3	4	Total
Governors	7	0	7	14	28
A&M Bulldogs	3	0	0	0	3

=== At Florida A&M ===
	1	2	3	4	Total
A&M Bulldogs	10	9	0	6	25
Rattlers	0	14	14	10	38

=== Bethune–Cookman ===
	1	2	3	4	Total
Wildcats	0	14	6	7	27
A&M Bulldogs	7	7	14	7	35

=== Grambling State ===
	1	2	3	4	OT	2OT	Total
Tigers	3	7	0	14	7	0	31
A&M Bulldogs	7	0	10	7	7	6	37

=== Arkansas–Pine Bluff ===
	1	2	3	4	Total
Golden Lions	10	14	7	3	34
A&M Bulldogs	14	3	7	7	31

=== Alabama State ===
	1	2	3	4	Total
Hornets	3	0	7	14	24
A&M Bulldogs	0	14	0	3	17

=== At Mississippi Valley State ===
	1	2	3	4	Total
A&M Bulldogs	0	7	7	6	20
Delta Devils	7	10	13	0	30

=== Vs. No. 9 Jackson State ===
	1	2	3	4	Total
No. 9 JSU Tigers	7	14	6	0	27
A&M Bulldogs	10	0	0	3	13

=== Texas Southern ===
	1	2	3	4	Total
TSU Tigers	0	8	6	6	20
A&M Bulldogs	0	3	0	21	24
