= 2022 Alabama State Hornets football team =

American college football season

2022 Alabama State Hornets football
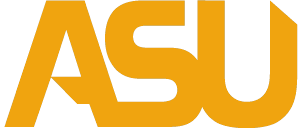
- Conference: Southwestern Athletic Conference
- East Division
- Record: 6–5 (4–4 SWAC)
- Head coach: Eddie Robinson (1st season)
- Offensive coordinator: Harry Williams (1st season)
- Defensive coordinator: Ryan Lewis Sr. (1st season)
- Home stadium: New ASU Stadium

2022 Southwestern Athletic Conference football standings
	Conf.			Overall
Team	W		L	W		L
East Division
No. 16 Jackson State xy$	8	–	0	12	–	1
Florida A&M	7	–	1	9	–	2
Alabama State	4	–	4	6	–	5
Alabama A&M	4	–	4	4	–	7
Bethune–Cookman	2	–	6	2	–	9
Mississippi Valley State	2	–	6	2	–	9
West Division
Southern xy	5	–	3	7	–	5
Prairie View A&M x	5	–	3	6	–	5
Alcorn State	4	–	4	5	–	6
Texas Southern	4	–	4	5	–	6
Grambling State	2	–	6	3	–	8
Arkansas–Pine Bluff	1	–	7	3	–	8
Championship: Jackson State 43, Southern 24
$ – Conference champion; x – Division champion/co-champions; y – Championship game participant; Rankings from STATS Poll

The 2022 Alabama State Hornets football team represented Alabama State University as a member of the East Division of the Southwestern Athletic Conference (SWAC) during the 2022 NCAA Division I FCS football season. Led by first-year head coach Eddie Robinson, the Wildcats played their home games at New ASU Stadium in Montgomery, Alabama.

== Schedule ==
Date	Time	Opponent	Site	TV	Result	Attendance
August 27	7:00 p.m.	vs. Howard*	Center Parc Stadium; Atlanta, GA (MEAC/SWAC Challenge)	ESPN	W 23–13	21,088
September 3	5:00 p.m.	Miles*	New ASU Stadium; Montgomery, AL	ESPN+	W 21–13	17,117
September 10	4:00 p.m.	at UCLA*	Rose Bowl; Pasadena, CA	P12N	L 7–45	33,647
September 24	5:00 p.m.	Prairie View A&M	New ASU Stadium; Montgomery, AL		L 15–25	6,976
October 1	5:00 p.m.	at Texas Southern	PNC Stadium; Houston, TX		W 16–13	6,742
October 8	2:00 p.m.	No. 8 Jackson State^{†}	New ASU Stadium; Montgomery, AL	ESPNU	L 12–26	28,332
October 15	2:00 p.m.	Mississippi Valley State	New ASU Stadium; Montgomery, AL		W 24–9	10,123
October 29	2:30 p.m.	vs. Alabama A&M	Legion Field; Birmingham, AL (Magic City Classic)	ESPN Networks	W 24–17	67,532
November 5	3:00 p.m.	at Bethune–Cookman	Daytona Stadium; Dayton Beach, FL	HBCU Go	W 37–22	7,729
November 12	2:00 p.m.	Florida A&M	New ASU Stadium; Montgomery, AL		L 14–21	23,687
November 24	2:00 p.m.	Arkansas–Pine Bluff	New ASU Stadium; Montgomery, AL (Turkey Day Classic)	ESPN+	L 14–19	14,000
*Non-conference game; ^{†}Homecoming; Rankings from STATS Poll released prior to the game; All times are in Central time

== Game summaries ==
=== Vs. Howard ===
	1	2	3	4	Total
Hornets	6	7	7	3	23
Bison	3	3	0	7	13

=== Miles ===
	1	2	3	4	Total
Golden Bears	0	3	3	7	13
Hornets	21	0	0	0	21

=== At UCLA ===
Alabama State Hornets (2-0) vs UCLA Bruins (1-0) – Game summary

Quarter	1	2	3	4	Total
Hornets (FCS)	0	7	0	0	7
Bruins	14	17	7	7	45

at Rose Bowl (stadium) • Pasadena, CA

- Date: September 10, 2022
- Game time: 2:00 p.m.
- Game weather: Cloudy, 78 °F (26 °C)
- Game attendance: 33,647
- Referee: Matthew Richards
- TV announcers (Pac-12 Network): J. B. Long (play-by-play), Nigel Burton (analyst)

Game information

First Quarter

- (7:58) UCLA – Keegan Jones 2-yard run, Nicholas Barr-Mira kick (Drive: 6 plays, 68 yards, 2:10; UCLA 7–0)
- (4:53) UCLA – Hudson Habermehl 25-yard pass from Dorian Thompson-Robinson, Nicholas Barr-Mira kick (Drive: 1 plays, 25 yards, 0:00; UCLA 14–0)

Second Quarter

- (13:53) ALST – Jeremiah Hixon 21–yard pass from Myles Crawley, Myles Crawley kick (Drive: 8 plays, 60 yards, 2:43; UCLA 14–7)
- (10:39) UCLA – Ethan Garbers 5-yard run, Nicholas Barr-Mira kick (Drive: 11 plays, 70 yards, 3:09; UCLA 21–7)
- (2:43) UCLA – Nicholas Barr-Mira 19-yard field goal (Drive: 11 plays, 83 yards, 4:14; UCLA 24–7)
- (1:02) UCLA – Ethan Garbers 2-yard run, Nicholas Barr-Mira kick (Drive: 6 plays, 62 yards, 0:42; UCLA 31–7)

Third Quarter

- (12:23) UCLA – T. J. Harden 13-yard run, Nicholas Barr-Mira kick (Drive: 8 plays, 70 yards, 2:33; UCLA 38–7)

Fourth Quarter

- (13:24) UCLA – Christian Grubb 7-yard run, Joseph Firebaugh Jr. kick (Drive: 5 plays, 55 yards, 1:23; UCLA 45–7)

Statistics	ALST	UCLA
First downs	18	28
Total yards	310	485
Rushes/yards	36–87	38–220
Passing yards	223	265
Passing: Comp–Att–Int	18–32–2	23–30–1
Time of possession	35:48	24:12

Team	Category	Player	Statistics
Alabama State	Passing	Myles Crawley	16/27, 177 yards, TD, INT
Alabama State	Rushing	Santo Dunn	5 carries, 28 yards
Alabama State	Receiving	Darius Edmonds	3 receptions, 66 yards
UCLA	Passing	Ethan Garbers	14/18, 168 yards, INT
UCLA	Rushing	T. J. Harden	7 carries, 56 yards, TD
UCLA	Receiving	Carsen Ryan	3 receptions, 58 yards

=== Prairie View A&M ===
	1	2	3	4	Total
Panthers	7	7	3	8	25
Hornets	6	0	3	6	15

=== At Texas Southern ===
	1	2	3	4	Total
Hornets	0	3	3	10	16
TSU Tigers	7	0	6	0	13

=== No. 8 Jackson State ===
	1	2	3	4	Total
No. 8 JSU Tigers	0	10	7	9	26
Hornets	6	0	0	6	12

=== Mississippi Valley State ===
	1	2	3	4	Total
Delta Devils	0	3	0	6	9
Hornets	7	10	0	7	24

=== Vs. Alabama A&M ===
	1	2	3	4	Total
Hornets	3	0	7	14	24
A&M Bulldogs	0	14	0	3	17

=== At Bethune–Cookman ===
	1	2	3	4	Total
Hornets	7	3	17	10	37
Wildcats	9	7	6	0	22

=== Florida A&M ===
	1	2	3	4	Total
Panthers	7	0	2	12	21
Hornets	0	7	0	7	14

=== Arkansas–Pine Bluff ===
	1	2	3	4	Total
Golden Lions	7	6	0	6	19
Hornets	0	0	14	0	14
