= 2022 Florida A&M Rattlers football team =

American college football season

2022 Florida A&M Rattlers football
- Conference: Southwestern Athletic Conference
- East Division

Ranking
- FCS Coaches: No. 23
- Record: 9–2 (7–1 SWAC)
- Head coach: Willie Simmons (4th season)
- Offensive coordinator: Joseph Henry (1st season)
- Offensive scheme: Spread
- Co-defensive coordinators: Brandon Sharp (2nd season); Ryan Smith (3rd season)
- Base defense: 4–3
- Home stadium: Bragg Memorial Stadium

2022 Southwestern Athletic Conference football standings
	Conf.			Overall
Team	W		L	W		L
East Division
No. 16 Jackson State xy$	8	–	0	12	–	1
Florida A&M	7	–	1	9	–	2
Alabama State	4	–	4	6	–	5
Alabama A&M	4	–	4	4	–	7
Bethune–Cookman	2	–	6	2	–	9
Mississippi Valley State	2	–	6	2	–	9
West Division
Southern xy	5	–	3	7	–	5
Prairie View A&M x	5	–	3	6	–	5
Alcorn State	4	–	4	5	–	6
Texas Southern	4	–	4	5	–	6
Grambling State	2	–	6	3	–	8
Arkansas–Pine Bluff	1	–	7	3	–	8
Championship: Jackson State 43, Southern 24
$ – Conference champion; x – Division champion/co-champions; y – Championship game participant; Rankings from STATS Poll

The 2022 Florida A&M Rattlers football team represented Florida A&M University as a member of the East Division of the Southwestern Athletic Conference (SWAC) during the 2022 NCAA Division I FCS football season. Led by fourth-year head coach Willie Simmons, the Rattlers played their home games at Bragg Memorial Stadium in Tallahassee, Florida.

== Schedule ==
Date	Time	Opponent	Site	TV	Result	Attendance
August 27	8:15 p.m.	at North Carolina*	Kenan Memorial Stadium; Chapel Hill, NC	ACCN	L 24–56	46,130
September 4	3:00 p.m.	vs. No. 15 Jackson State	Hard Rock Stadium; Miami Gardens, FL (Orange Blossom Classic)	ESPN2	L 3–59	39,907
September 10	6:00 p.m.	Albany State*	Bragg Memorial Stadium; Tallahassee, FL	HBCU Go	W 23–13	18,870
September 24	6:00 p.m.	Alabama A&M	Bragg Memorial Stadium; Tallahassee, FL	ESPN+	W 38–25	7,595
October 1	6:00 p.m.	Mississippi Valley State	Bragg Memorial Stadium; Tallahassee, FL		W 34–7	10,699
October 8	2:00 p.m.	at South Carolina State*	Oliver C. Dawson Stadium; Orangeburg, SC		W 20–14	13,495
October 15	3:00 p.m.	at Grambling State	Eddie Robinson Stadium; Grambling, LA	HBCU Go	W 20–16	7,195
October 29	4:00 p.m.	Arkansas–Pine Bluff^{†}	Bragg Memorial Stadium; Tallahassee, FL	HBCU Go	W 27–6	19,802
November 5	7:30 p.m.	Southern	Bragg Memorial Stadium; Tallahassee, FL	ESPNU	W 30–16	15,126
November 12	3:00 p.m.	at Alabama State	New ASU Stadium; Montgomery, AL		W 21–14	23,687
November 19	2:30 p.m.	vs. Bethune–Cookman	Camping World Stadium; Orlando, FL (Florida Classic)	ESPNU	W 41–20	55,257
*Non-conference game; ^{†}Homecoming; Rankings from STATS Poll released prior to the game; All times are in Eastern time

== Game summaries ==
=== At North Carolina ===
Florida A&M at North Carolina

Team	1	2	3	4	Total
Rattlers	7	7	10	0	24
• Tar Heels	14	14	7	21	56

- Date: August 27, 2022
- Location: Kenan Stadium
  Chapel Hill, NC
- Game start: 8:21 p.m. EDT
- Elapsed time: 3 hours, 24 minutes
- Game attendance: 46,130
- Game weather: Cloudy • 79 °F (26 °C) • Wind: SE 1 MPH
- Referee: Mike Roche
- TV announcers (ACCN): Matt Barrie (play-by-play), Tim Hasselbeck (analyst), and Kelsey Riggs (sideline)

Scoring summary
1	5:51	UNC	Kamari Morales 19 yd. pass from Drake Maye (Noah Burnette kick) (7 plays, 78 yards, 2:21)	UNC 7–0
1	3:21	FAMU	AJ Davis 17 yd. pass from Jeremy Moussa (Jose Romo-Martinez kick) (8 plays, 75 yards, 2:30)	Tie 7–7
1	0:29	UNC	Bryson Nesbit 23 yd. pass from Drake Maye (Noah Burnette kick) (7 plays, 75 yards, 2:52)	UNC 14–7
2	7:39	UNC	Gavin Blackwell 4 yd. pass from Drake Maye (Noah Burnette kick) (12 plays, 83 yards, 5:09)	UNC 21–7
2	2:01	FAMU	Jaylen McCloud 5 yd. rush (Jose Romo-Martinez kick) (12 plays, 75 yards, 5:38)	UNC 21–14
2	0:05	UNC	Josh Downs 2 yd. pass from Drake Maye (Noah Burnette kick) (5 plays, 21 yards, 0:26)	UNC 28–14
3	12:10	UNC	Omarion Hampton 1 yd. rush (Noah Burnette kick) (7 plays, 65 yards, 2:50)	UNC 35–14
3	7:41	FAMU	Jose Romo-Martinez 35 yd. field goal (10 plays, 57 yards, 4:29)	UNC 35–17
3	1:18	FAMU	Trevonte Davis 22 yd. pass from Jeremy Moussa (Jose Romo-Martinez kick) (5 plays, 60 yards, 2:34)	UNC 35–24
4	13:24	UNC	George Pettaway 29 yd. rush (Noah Burnette kick) (8 plays, 77 yards, 2:49)	UNC 42–24
4	12:37	UNC	Josh Downs 27 yd. pass from Drake Maye (Noah Burnette kick) (1 play, 27 yards, 0:06)	UNC 49–24
4	8:14	UNC	Omarion Hampton 25 yd. rush (Noah Burnette kick) (4 plays, 44yards, 1:33)	UNC 56–24

Statistics	FAMU	UNC
First downs	20	29
Plays–yards	68–335	78–608
Rushes–yards	27–56	40–314
Passing yards	279	294
Passing: comp–att–int	28–39–1	29–38–0
Time of possession	29:01	30:59

Team	Category	Player	Statistics
FAMU	Passing	Jeremy Moussa	28/38, 279 yards, 2 TD, INT
FAMU	Rushing	Terrell Jennings	10 carries, 39 yards
FAMU	Receiving	Xavier Smith	10 receptions, 78 yards
North Carolina	Passing	Drake Maye	29/37, 294 yards, 5 TD
North Carolina	Rushing	Omarion Hampton	14 carries, 101 yards, 2 TD
North Carolina	Receiving	Josh Downs	9 rec, 78 yards, 2 TD

=== Vs. No. 15 Jackson State ===
	1	2	3	4	Total
No. 15 JSU Tigers	7	17	21	14	59
Rattlers	0	3	0	0	3

Statistics	FAMU	JKST
First downs	13	27
Total yards	155	471
Rushing yards	34	139
Passing yards	121	332
Turnovers	4	0
Time of possession	24:19	35:41

Team	Category	Player	Statistics
Florida A&M	Passing	Jeremy Moussa	11/27, 102 yards, INT
Florida A&M	Rushing	Terrell Jennings	9 rushes, 30 yards
Florida A&M	Receiving	Darian Oxendine	1 reception, 32 yards
Jackson State	Passing	Shedeur Sanders	29/33, 323 yards, 5 TD
Jackson State	Rushing	Santee Marshall	13 rushes, 65 yards
Jackson State	Receiving	Dallas Daniels	5 receptions, 59 yards, TD

=== Albany State ===
	1	2	3	4	Total
Golden Rams	7	0	0	6	13
Rattlers	0	17	6	0	23

=== Alabama A&M ===
	1	2	3	4	Total
Bulldogs	10	9	0	6	25
Rattlers	0	14	14	10	38

=== Mississippi Valley State ===
	1	2	3	4	Total
Delta Devils	7	0	0	0	7
Rattlers	7	7	10	10	34

=== At South Carolina State ===
	1	2	3	4	Total
Rattlers	7	10	3	0	20
SCSU Bulldogs	0	0	0	14	14

=== At Grambling State ===
	1	2	3	4	Total
Rattlers	0	3	14	3	20
GSU Tigers	0	10	0	6	16

=== Arkansas–Pine Bluff ===
	1	2	3	4	Total
Golden Lions	0	0	0	6	6
Rattlers	0	17	7	3	27

=== Southern ===
	1	2	3	4	Total
Jaguars	3	6	7	0	16
Rattlers	7	10	10	3	30

=== At Alabama State ===
	1	2	3	4	Total
Rattlers	7	0	2	12	21
Hornets	0	7	0	7	14

=== Vs. Bethune–Cookman ===
	1	2	3	4	Total
Rattlers	13	14	0	14	41
Wildcats	0	7	7	6	20
