= Eric Dooley =

American football player and coach (born 1965)

Current position
- Title: Offensive coordinator
- Team: Edward Waters
- Conference: SIAC

Biographical details
- Born: July 14, 1965 (age 61)
- Education: Southern–New Orleans (1999); Southern–Baton Rouge (2005)

Playing career
- 1985–1988: Grambling State
- 1993: Arizona Rattlers
- Positions: Wide receiver, defensive back

Coaching career (HC unless noted)
- 1997: Southern (RB)
- 1998–2010: Southern (WR)
- 2011–2013: Arkansas–Pine Bluff (OC/QB)
- 2014: Grambling State (OC/QB)
- 2015: Grambling State (OC)
- 2016–2017: Grambling State (OC/WR)
- 2018–2021: Prairie View A&M
- 2022–2023: Southern
- 2024–2025: Grambling State (OC/QB)
- 2026–present: Edward Waters (OC)

Head coaching record
- Overall: 32–27

Accomplishments and honors

Championships
- 2× SWAC West Division (2021, 2022)

Awards
- AFCA Assistant Coach of the Year (2016)

Eric Dooley (born July 14, 1965) is an American college football coach and former player. He is the offensive coordinator for Edward Waters University, a position he has held since 2026. Before that, Dooley was the offensive coordinator and quarterbacks coach for Grambling State University, positions he held from 2024 to 2025. He was the head football coach at Southern University from 2022 to 2023. Dooley served as the head football coach at Prairie View A&M University in Prairie View, Texas from 2018 to 2021.

A former Grambling State University player, Dooley also spent one season in the Arena Football League with the Arizona Rattlers in 1993.

== Head coaching record ==
Year	Team	Overall	Conference	Standing	Bowl/playoffs
Prairie View A&M Panthers (Southwestern Athletic Conference) (2018–2021)
2018	Prairie View A&M	5–6	4–3	T–2nd (West)	
2019	Prairie View A&M	6–5	4–3	T-2nd (West)	
2020–21	Prairie View A&M	2–1	2–1	3rd (West)	
2021	Prairie View A&M	7–5	6–2	T–1st (West)	
Prairie View A&M:		20–17	16–9		
Southern Jaguars (Southwestern Athletic Conference) (2022–2023)
2022	Southern	7–5	5–3	T–1st (West)	
2023	Southern	5–5 (Note: Dooley was fired after ten weeks and Terrence Graves was named as interim head coach.)	4–3		
Southern:		12–10	9–6		
Total:		32–27			
National championship Conference title Conference division title or championship game berth
