= Alfie Oakes =

American farmer, businessman, and politician

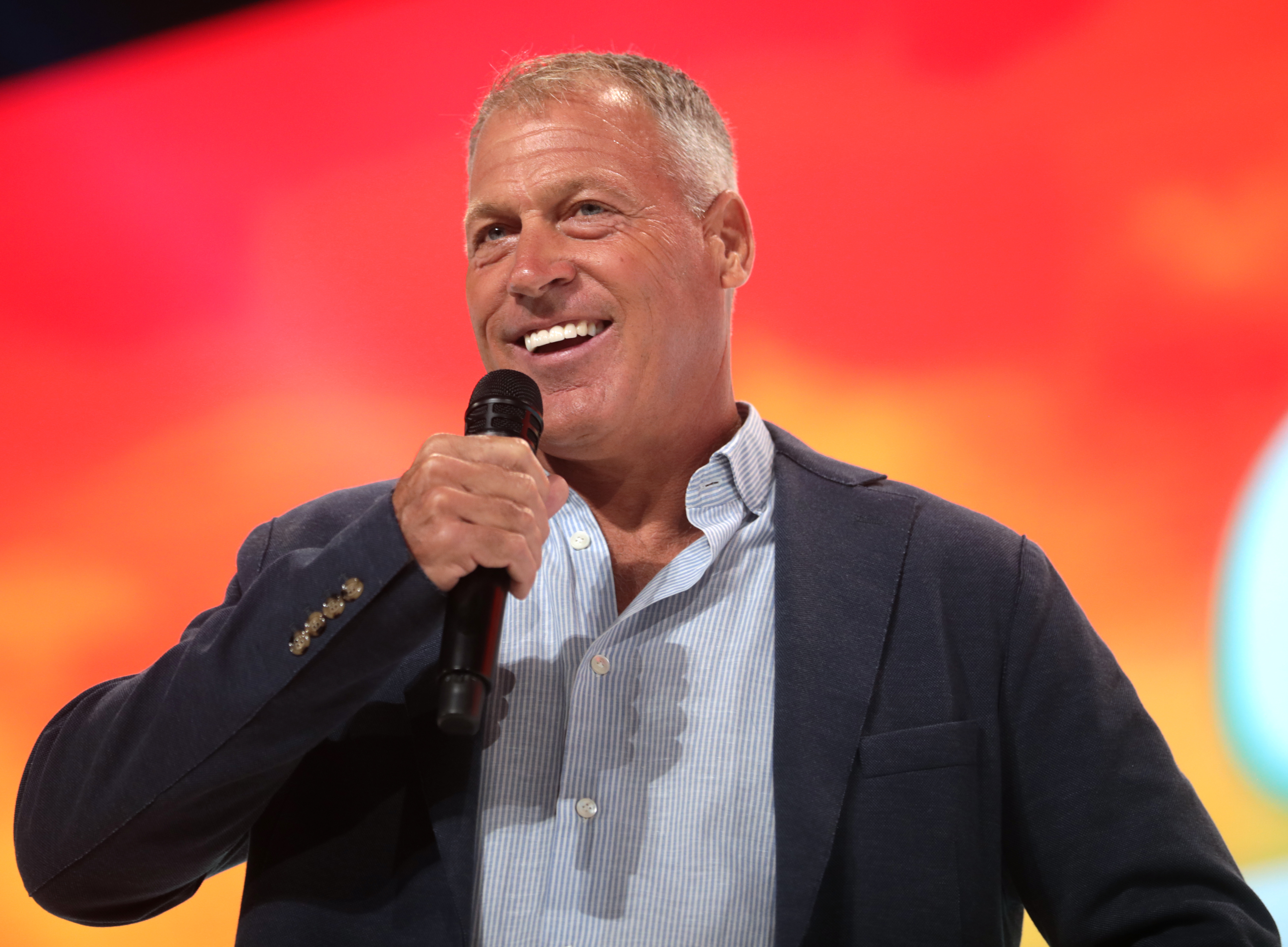
- Oakes at the 2021 Student Action Summit hosted by Turning Point USA
- Born: Francis Alfred Oakes; June 16, 1968 (age 58); Delaware City, Delaware, U.S.
- Education: North Fort Myers High School
- Occupations: farmer; retailer; wholesaler
- Known for: Founder of Oakes Farms, Politician
- Title: Founder and Chief Executive Officer of Oakes Farms
- Spouse: Deanne Dilger Oakes
- Children: 3
- Father: Francis Alfred Oakes Jr., "Frankie"
- Website: www.oakesfarms.com

Francis Alfred Oakes III (born June 16, 1968) is an American farmer, agriculture entrepreneur, political influencer and businessman from Southwest Florida. He is the founder and CEO of Oakes Farms, an agribusiness based in Immokalee, Florida, which produces, packages, distributes, and sells fruits, vegetables, and other agricultural products. He also owns Seed to Table, Fruit Dynamics, Food & Thought and Thoughtful Threads. Alfie Oakes represented Collier County as a State Committeeman for the Republican Party of Florida from 2020 to 2024 but was disqualified to run in 2024. He is an outspoken supporter of Donald Trump, critic of Black Lives Matter and the media, and proponent of COVID-19 conspiracy theories. He is an ambassador for Turning Point USA.

== Early life ==
Alfie Oakes was born in Delaware City, Delaware, on June 16, 1968. He relocated to Florida with his family when he was a child and attended North Fort Myers High School. He became involved in his family's produce business at age five and started his first agribusiness at age 18, planting and selling tomatoes, strawberries, and zucchini. When his crops were destroyed by a freeze in 1989, he began importing tomatoes from Honduras. His early business ventures were challenging due to inexperience, despite raising nearly $1,000,000, so he relocated to Western Texas to sell watermelons.

== Oakes Farms ==
Oakes returned to Florida to plant cucumbers on 40 acres (16 ha) of leased land in Punta Gorda, and he used the profits from that operation to create Oakes Farms Market in Naples along with his father Frank Oakes in 1994. His father left the company to open his own organic farm and store in 2005.

Oakes Farms expanded into aquaculture in 2014 and added egg-producing chickens in 2015. The company has farms in Collier and Hendry counties in Florida and other farms in Alabama, Tennessee, North Carolina and New Jersey. Oakes Farm has several contracts with the federal government. In 2018, Oakes farm won a $46 million contract to provide food to the Department of Defense, and in 2020, Oakes Farms was awarded a $70 million contract to distribute food boxes by the Trump Administration.

In May 2021, Oakes stepped down from Oakes Farms Food & Distribution Services and handed over the company to employee ownership. In 2018, Oakes Farm was sued by producer C-Squared Farms for an alleged violation of the Perishable Agricultural Commodities Act (PACA) and breach of contract, but Oakes Farms ultimately succeeded at trial on its counterclaims for breach of contract.

The company opened a 74,000-square-foot (6,900 m^{2}) supermarket named Seed To Table in December 2019. Seed to Table is located in North Naples, Florida.

=== Financial fraud ===
In November 2024, federal agents raided several properties owned by Oakes. A number of Oakes Farms employees, including its vice president, general manager, farm managers and warehouse managers, were arrested and plead guilty to charges including fraud, money laundering, and conspiracy involving at least $8.685 million in federal COVID-19 relief funding.

== Politics ==
Oakes was elected to represent Collier County as a State Committeeman for the Republican Party of Florida in 2020. He was disqualified from running again in 2024.

Oakes was critical of governmental response to COVID-19, Black Lives Matter, and George Floyd. Following statements by Oakes calling both the COVID-19 pandemic and the Black Lives Matter movement hoaxes and labeling George Floyd a "disgraceful career criminal," the District School Board of Collier County and the School District of Lee County severed ties with his business, a move leading to a $50 million lawsuit against Lee County Schools. In 2020, Collier County, Florida sued to enforce its mask mandate against Oakes; the County dropped the suit in 2021. Oakes sued Collier County, Florida arguing that the mask mandate was unconstitutional and invalid, but in 2021, the Court dismissed 11 of his 14 claims.

=== 2020 election ===
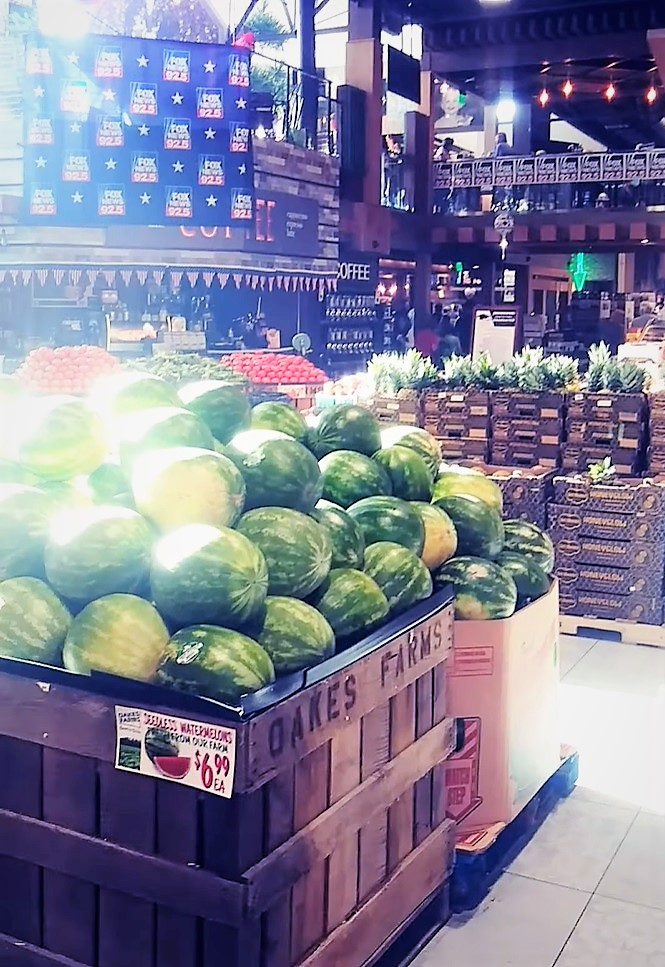
"Seed to Table" Naples store interior, 2021

Oakes is an outspoken supporter of Donald J. Trump. During the 2020 United States presidential election, he hosted several events supporting President Trump's re-election at his Seed To Table store in North Naples and helped organize a group of 100 local protestors to travel to the United States Capitol on January 6, 2021, speaking positively of the January 6 United States Capitol attack afterward. Oakes also endorsed Republican Byron Donalds' congressional election and erected signs promoting his candidacy at his Seed To Table store. That same year, Oakes was elected to be the Collier County Republican Party Committeeman. On June 14, 2024, although previously announcing his intention to run for re-election, he filed his candidate qualifying forms after the noon deadline and was declared disqualified.

=== Undocumented workers ===
In 2014, Fruit Dynamics was raided by the Florida Division of Insurance Fraud, resulting in 105 undocumented workers being arrested for workers’ compensation fraud and criminal use of personal identification. Oakes denied knowledge of the workers' undocumented status, but the company offered to post bail for the workers to be released from jail. According to immigration advocacy groups, the raid was the largest in Florida history at the time. Many of those arrested were admitted to pretrial diversion programs. In 2016, Oakes told CBS News, "Forty to 80 percent can be undocumented on any given day, and I can tell you, if we were to lose 40 to 80 percent of our workforce, we would be crippled here."
