= Street Fighter (1994 soundtrack) =

Soundtrack album by Various artists
- Released: December 6, 1994
- Recorded: 1994
- Genre: Hip hop
- Length: 57:19
- Label: Priority
- Producers: Andrew M. Shack (exec.); 88 X Unit; Chage and Aska; Chris Large; CMT; D'Maq; E-A-Ski; Go Yamazato; Graeme Revell; Jean Hebrail; Joe Quixx; King Tech; Laylaw; MC Hammer; Mr. Freaknasti; Paris; The Pharcyde

Professional ratings
Review scores
Source	Rating
AllMusic	2.5/5 stars
Music Week	3/5 stars

Street Fighter is the soundtrack to Steven E. de Souza 1994 action film Street Fighter. It was released on December 6, 1994, by Priority Records, and consists primarily of hip hop music. Several notable artists from the genre were featured, including Ice Cube, MC Hammer and Nas.

The soundtrack found some success on the Billboard charts, peaking at No. 135 on the Billboard 200 and No. 34 on the Top R&B/Hip-Hop Albums. It featured one charting single by Rally Ral, "Something Kinda Funky", which reached No. 39 on the Hot Rap Singles. "Straight to My Feet" by Hammer and Deion Sanders, was the only single released in the United Kingdom, where it charted at No. 57.

The album sold over 500,000 units in the United States.

== Track listing ==
No.	Title	Writer(s)	Producer(s)	Length
1.	"Street Fighter" (performed by Ice Cube)	O. Jackson Sr.	88 X Unit	4:59
2.	"Come Widdit" (performed by Ahmad, Ras Kass & Saafir)	A. Lewis; J. Austin; R. Gibson; R. Sepand	King Tech	4:50
3.	"One On One" (performed by Nas)	N. Jones; C. Jones; R. Santiago	Chris Large; Mr. Freaknasty	3:30
4.	"Pandemonium" (performed by The Pharcyde)	D. Stewart; E. Wilcox; R. Robinson; T. Hardson	The Pharcyde; Anthony D. Walker (add.); Kywani Robinson (add.)	4:19
5.	"Street Soldier" (performed by Paris)	O. Jackson, Jr.	Paris	4:26
6.	"Something Kinda Funky" (performed by Rally Ral)	R. Laws, Jr.	E-A-Ski; CMT	4:12
7.	"It's a Street Fight" (performed by The B.U.M.S.)	D. Smith; E. Alexander; S. Rodriguez	Joe Quixx	3:49
8.	"Life as..." (performed by LL Cool J)	J.T. Smith; O. Harvey	Easy Mo Bee	4:35
9.	"Do You Have What It Takes?" (performed by Craig Mack)	C. Mack	Joe Quixx	4:35
10.	"Straight to My Feet" (performed by MC Hammer & Deion Sanders)	S. Burrell	MC Hammer	4:36
11.	"Rumbo N Da Jungo" (performed by Chuck D & The Wreck League)	C. Ridenhour; K. Young; The Alias K.B.	Chuck D	2:50
12.	"Rap Commando" (performed by Anotha Level)	D. Bush; D. Brown; M. Bacon	D-Maq; Laylaw	3:15
13.	"Worth Fighting For" (performed by Angélique Kidjo)	A. Kidjo; G. Revell; J. Hebrail	Graeme Revell; Jean Hebrail	4:38
14.	"Something There" (performed by Chage and Aska)	R. Aska	Chage and Aska; Go Yamazato	5:02
Total length:				57:19

== Chart history ==
Chart (1995)	Peak position
US Billboard 200	135
US Top R&B/Hip-Hop Albums (Billboard)	34

== See also ==
- Street Fighter (2026 soundtrack)
