= Deion & Pilar: Prime Time Love =

- Genre: Reality
- Starring: Deion Sanders; Pilar Sanders
- Country of origin: United States
- Original language: English
- No. of seasons: 1
- No. of episodes: 8

Production
- Executive producers: Deion Sanders; Kevin Lee; Rob Lobl; Sam Sokolow
- Running time: 22 minutes
- Production companies: SokoLobl Entertainment; Tollbooth Television

Original release
- Network: Oxygen
- Release: April 15 – June 3, 2008

Deion & Pilar: Prime Time Love is an American reality television series that airs on Oxygen. The series follows the home life of former professional athlete Deion Sanders and his wife Pilar. It premiered on April 15, 2008.

== Episodes ==
No.	Title	Original release date
1	"Pilar's Picks; Deiondra's Big Date"	April 15, 2008
Deion refuses to help out around the house because he is busy with planning his football picks for a radio show. Deion offers to help daughter Deiondra prepare for a first date.
2	"Pilar's Lesson; Birds and the Bees"	April 22, 2008
Pilar feels her efforts as a wife and mother are unappreciated and devises a plan to show Deion what her work is worth.
3	"Family Cook Off; Selling Candy"	April 29, 2008
Deion and Pilar have a cook-off to decide who cooks the best, and Deion tries to help his children sell cookies for a fundraiser.
4	"Prime Time Romance; What a Woman Wants"	May 6, 2008
Deion and Pilar try to help Bucky with his girl troubles. Pilar tries to spice up her marriage.
5	"Pilar's Campout; Deion's Midlife Crisis"	May 13, 2008
Deion is unable to take his family fishing due to work commitments, so Pilar decides to teach the kids how to fish and camp her way. Deion experiences a mini mid-life crisis.
6	"Couple's Therapy; Dating Deiondra"	May 20, 2008
Deion and Pilar help a couple learn about marriage by revealing their marriage experience, and Pilar tries to romance Deion. Deion meets Deiondra's suitors.
7	"Cattle Drive; Prime Time Sex Time"	May 27, 2008
Pilar tries to release her inner cowgirl and wrangle the loose cattle back into the back pasture.
8	"Pilar Modeling Agency; Back to School"	June 3, 2008
Pilar launches a modeling business. Deion helps Shiloh prepare for a math quiz.
