= The B.U.M.S. (Brothas Unda Madness) =

American hip hop group

- Evocalist (left) and D.Wyze (right), 1994

Background information
- Also known as: The B.U.M.S.
- Origin: Oakland, California, US
- Genre: West Coast hip hop
- Years active: 1994–1995
- Label: Priority
- Members: Evol "Evocalist" Alexander; D'Angelo "D. Wyze" Smith

The B.U.M.S. (Brothas Unda Madness) is an American West Coast hip hop duo from Oakland, California composed of emcees D'Wyze (born July 10, 1970) and Evocalist (born on November 13, 1971). Following the footsteps of west coast rappers such as The Pharcyde, Freestyle Fellowship, Souls of Mischief, Ahmad and Sway & King Tech, the group had little success with releasing their only debut album Lyfe 'N' Tyme, releasing two of their singles "Elevation (Free My Mind)" and "Take a Look Around" before disbanding in 1995 altogether after the album's commercial failure.

== History ==
In 1991, Brothas Unda Madness were under association with rapper/DJ duo Sway & King Tech, a group from San Francisco, California, that went on to be creators and hosts of The Wake Up Show, radio station based in San Francisco for KMEL on late Friday nights. D'Wyze being from areas of East Oakland while Evocalist was from North Oakland. They first met each other while being on the Wake Up Show when Sway told D'Wyze to work alongside Evocalist. D. Wyze was carrying records of crates for Tech while doing gigs at his shows, while not working as a barber in Oakland. Evocalist was a breakdancer, which also rhymed and danced on The Wake Up Show. Sebastian "Joe Quixx" Rodriguez was also a DJ on The Wake Up Show for years. In 1993, while the group was working on The Wake Up Show, an A&R from Priority Records heard freestyling on the air and questioned about who there are. They were told they were looking for Bay Area rappers and wanted to sign them to a record deal, after listening to their freestyle raps from the show. The name "The Bums" was given by King Tech. D. Wyze came up with the acronym that best describes the group . The group signed with Priority Records and released a song called "It's a Street Fight' which is on the Street Fighter soundtrack.

The group released their debut album Lyfe 'N' Tyme. Joe Quixx produced 8 out of 20 tracks, leaving the mast majority of production of various producers on the LP. The album was released on June 1, 1995 on Priority Records. The group released their hit single called "Elevation (Free My Mind)" in 1994. A year later after that with "Take a Look Around".

After a limited mainstream success, the group disbanded in 1995 right after Priority Records didn't have resources to push this album into a popularity status

The album Lyfe 'N' Tyme was re-released under the help of Phat Philly, a music distributor who asked D'Wyze of The Bums to help get the album released on CD, vinyl, cassette and through Spotify respectfully.

== Discography ==
Albums

- Lyfe 'N' Tyme (1995)

Singles

- 1994 – "Elevation (Free My Mind)"
- 1995 – "Take a Look Around"
