= Insurance fraud =

Defrauding of insurance

Insurance fraud is any intentional act committed to deceive or mislead an insurance company during the application or claims process, or the wrongful denial of a legitimate claim by an insurance company. It occurs when a claimant knowingly attempts to obtain a benefit or advantage they are not entitled to receive, or when an insurer knowingly denies a benefit or advantage that is due to the insured. According to the United States Federal Bureau of Investigation, the most common schemes include premium diversion, fee churning, asset diversion, and workers compensation fraud. False insurance claims are insurance claims filed with the fraudulent intention towards an insurance provider.

Fraudulent claims account for a significant portion of all claims received by insurers, and cost billions of dollars annually. Insurance fraud poses a significant problem, and governments and other organizations try to deter such activity.

Studies suggest that the greatest total dollar amount of fraud is committed by the health insurance companies themselves, intentionally not paying claims and deleting them from their systems, and denying and cancelling coverage.

== History ==
Insurance fraud has existed since the beginning of insurance as a commercial enterprise.

Long before the rise of the modern insurance industry, an epigram by the Roman poet Martial, set in the Roman Empire during the first century AD, illustrates how crimes such as arson might be motivated by profit:

"Tongilianus, you paid two hundred [denarii] for your house;
An accident too common in this city destroyed it.
You collected ten times more. Doesn't it seem, I pray,
That you set fire to your own house, Tongilianus?"
Book III, No. 52

== Causes ==
The "chief motive in all insurance crimes is financial profit". Insurance contracts provide both the insured and the insurer with opportunities for exploitation.

According to the American Coalition Against Insurance Fraud, the causes vary, but are usually centered on greed, and on holes in the protections against fraud. Those who commit insurance fraud may view it as a low-risk, lucrative enterprise as compared to other forms of criminal activity.

== Financial impact ==
As insurance fraud may not be detected, it is difficult to accurately estimate its total cost to society. Among organizations that have estimated its cost, the Coalition Against Insurance Fraud estimates that in 2006 a total of about $80 billion was lost in the United States due to insurance fraud. In 2022 the Coalition published a revised estimate of $308.6 billion a year, which covered all lines of insurance and adjusted for inflation; its earlier $80 billion figure had included only property and casualty insurance. The Insurance Information Institute estimates that insurance fraud accounts for about 10 percent of the property/casualty insurance industry's incurred losses and loss adjustment expenses. The National Health Care Anti-Fraud Association estimates that 3% of the health care industry's expenditures in the United States are due to fraudulent activities, amounting to a cost of about $51 billion. According to the FBI, non-health insurance fraud costs an estimated $40 billion per year, which increases the premiums for the average U.S. family between $400 and $700 annually.

Another study of all types of fraud committed in the United States insurance institutions (property-and-casualty, business liability, healthcare, social security, etc.) estimates the cost at 33% to 38% of the total cash flow through the system. This study resulted in the book title The Trillion Dollar Insurance Crook by J.E. Smith. In the United Kingdom, the Insurance Fraud Bureau estimates that the loss due to insurance fraud in the United Kingdom is about £1.5 billion ($3.08 billion), causing a 5% increase in insurance premiums. The Association of British Insurers reported that UK insurers detected 93,900 fraudulent general insurance claims worth £1.34 billion in 2025. The Insurance Bureau of Canada estimates that personal injury fraud in Canada costs about C$500 million annually. Indiaforensic Center of Studies estimates that Insurance frauds in India costs about $6.25 billion annually.

== Types of insurance fraud ==
Insurance fraud can be classified as either hard fraud or soft fraud.

Hard fraud occurs when someone deliberately plans or invents a loss, such as a collision, auto theft, or fire that is covered by their insurance policy in order to claim payment for damages. Criminal rings are sometimes involved in hard fraud schemes that can steal millions of dollars.

Soft fraud, which is more common than hard fraud, is sometimes also referred to as opportunistic fraud. This type of fraud consists of policyholders exaggerating otherwise legitimate claims. For example, when involved in an automotive collision an insured person might claim more damage than actually occurred.

=== Automobile insurance ===
Automobile insurance fraud occurs when somebody intentionally seeks benefits from an insurance company that they know that they are not legitimately entitled to receive.

The UK Insurance Research Council estimated that in 1996, 21 to 36 percent of auto-insurance claims contained elements of suspected fraud.

Schemes used to defraud automobile insurance providers differ greatly in complexity and severity, and include both individual and organized efforts.

==== Staged collisions ====
Fraud rings or groups may fake traffic deaths or stage collisions to make false insurance or exaggerated claims and collect insurance money. The fraud may involve the engineering of a deliberate collision with the innocent driver of another vehicle. Some fraud rings involve insurance claims adjusters who authorize payment on the claims. In the UK, the Association of Chief Police Officers estimated that 30,000 auto accidents were staged in 2009. Insurance fraud may also include such actions as a pedestrian jumping in front of a car, then seeking compensation for claimed injuries.

Staged collision schemes may involve fraud at three different levels. At the top, there are lawyers who file fraudulent claims, supported by doctors who fabricate or exaggerate diagnoses and treatment records. Next are the "cappers" or "runners", the middlemen who obtain the cars to crash, farm out the claims to the professionals at the top, and recruit participants. At the bottom are the participants recruited to risk injury in the staged accidents. These rings may involve organized crime.

==== Exaggerated claims ====
After a motor vehicle collision, a vehicle owner may attempt to make a claim for coverage beyond the scope of what was caused by the accident, for example by seeking coverage for preexisting damage. Physical injuries may also be exaggerated by a driver or other person claiming injury in a collision.

==== False reports of theft ====
Insurance fraud occurs when an insured party falsely report their vehicle as stolen.

==== Rate evasion ====
In rate evasion, a vehicle owner registers a vehicle to a location where the insurer offers lower rates as compared to where they actually reside.

Another form of fraud, known as "fronting", involves registering someone other than the real primary driver of a car as the primary driver of the car in order to obtain a lower rate, such as a young driver having an insurance policy in the name of a parent.

=== Health insurance ===
Health insurance fraud involves an intentional act of deceiving, concealing, or misrepresenting information that results in health care benefits being paid to an individual or group, or being wrongfully denied to a person entitled to receive benefits. Fraud can be committed either by an insured person or by a provider.

Member fraud consists of such acts as the making of claims on behalf of ineligible members or their dependents, making false statements on enrollment forms, concealing preexisting conditions that could affect the scope of coverage or cost of the policy, and failure to disclose claims that were a result of a work-related injury in violation of the terms of a health insurance policy.

Provider fraud consists of claims submitted by medical care providers, and may include billing for services not rendered, billing for higher level of services than those provided, making false statements on claims submissions, double-billing by doctors who charge more than once for the same service, performance of unnecessary medical treatments or surgery, and billing for services other than those actually rendered. Providers may also bill for care actually provided to their patients, but which is not medically necessary. Practices that may be used to perpetrate fraud include "up-coding" or "upgrading", which involve billing for more expensive treatments than those actually provided; "phantom billing", billing for services not rendered; and "ganging", billing for services to family members or other individuals who are accompanying the patient but who did not personally receive any services.

Health insurance fraud depletes the resources of taxpayer-funded programs like Medicare. Public healthcare programs such as Medicare and Medicaid are especially conducive to fraudulent activities, as they are often run on a fee-for-service structure.

It is estimated that in the U.S., as of 2017, $262 billion in healthcare claims are initially denied, and health systems spend approximately $20 billion each year trying to secure payment for valid health insurance claims that were wrongly denied, including some claims that were preapproved by the insurance company. Forms of fraud by health insurance companies include the wrongful denial of claims, wrongful cancellation of coverage, and underpayment of hospitals and physicians.

When detected, health insurance fraud can result in civil liability as well as criminal penalties, and potential action against a healthcare provider's license.

=== Life insurance ===
The majority of life insurance fraud occurs at the application stage, involving applicants misrepresenting their health, their income, and other personal information in order to get a cheaper premium. As more and more insurance amendments can be performed online or over the telephone, identity theft has become an enabling crime that can lead to the amendment of life insurance terms to benefit a fraudster; for example, by adding a second stolen identity as a new beneficiary.

Life insurance fraud may involve faking death to claim life insurance. Fraudsters may sometimes turn up a few years after disappearing, claiming a loss of memory. For example, in the case of John Darwin, a former teacher and prison officer turned up alive five years after he was purported to have died in a canoeing accident, after his family had made a successful claim on his life insurance. Similarly, former British Government minister John Stonehouse reportedly missing in 1974 from a beach in Miami after the acquisition of multiple life insurance policies, but was discovered living under an assumed name in Australia.

=== Premium fraud ===
Insurers can lose premium income when customers provide false or misleading information about risk, causing a lower premium to be charged. This can happen with any type of insurable risk. For example, when applying for workers compensation insurance, an employer may report fewer employees, a lower total payroll, and less risk of employee negligence or injury than actually exists, obtaining coverage at a lower cost than would result from accurate disclosure.

=== Property insurance ===
Property insurance fraud includes obtaining payment that exceeds the value of the repair or replacement of insured property, or the intentional infliction of damage or destruction of insured property for the purpose of making an insurance claim. The most common forms of property insurance fraud are re-framing a non-insured damage to make it an event covered by insurance, and inflating the value of the loss.

Property insurance crimes often involve arson, as evidence that a fire was intentionally started may be destroyed by the fire itself. According to the United States Fire Administration, in the United States there were approximately 31,000 fires caused by arson in 2006, resulting in losses of $755 million.

Another form for fraud is over-insurance, in which someone insures property for more than its real value. This condition can be difficult to avoid, especially since an insurance provider might sometimes encourage it to obtain greater profits.

=== Unemployment insurance ===
Unemployment insurance fraud can be perpetrated by both employers and employees. Employer fraud involves efforts to avoid payment of unemployment taxes, or the creation of a false business entity through which fraudulent employee claims are submitted. Employee fraud occurs when somebody seeks benefits to which they are not entitled, for example, when someone who is not unemployed or who steals the identity of another individual in order to claim that other person's benefits.

During the pandemic in 2020, there was a significant spike of unemployment fraud in the United States.

== Detection ==
Due to the high volume of insurance claims made across the industry, it is not possible for insurance companies to review all claims for fraud.

The detection of insurance fraud usually begins with the identification of suspicious claims, those that have a higher possibility of being fraudulent. This may be accomplished with computerized statistical analysis that compares data about a claim to expected values, or through review by claims adjusters or insurance agents. Sometimes insurance fraud is detected as a result of law enforcement investigation, or tips from members of the public. Any claim that is identified as suspect may then be investigated for possible fraud.

=== Statistical analysis ===
Statistical analysis may involve supervised and unsupervised machine learning. For a supervised approach, expected values are obtained by analyzing records of both fraudulent and non-fraudulent claims. To be accurate in its evaluation of claims, it is necessary that the claims analyzed when training the model are accurately identified as either fraudulent or non-fraudulent.

For unsupervised statistical detection, the goal is to detect claims that are abnormal as compared to other claims, and to have the algorithm identify "red flag" factors that are associated with past fraudulent claims. This process is not intended to prove that a given claim is fraudulent, but instead to efficiently identify claims that should be subjected to further review.

Fraudulent claims can be one of may be identified as "built up", meaning that they are legitimate claims that are exaggerated in their value, or they may be false claims for damages that never occurred. For built up claims, insurance companies usually try to negotiate the claim down to an appropriate amount.

=== Fraud investigators ===
Suspicious claims may be submitted to the insurance company's fraud investigators, who work for divisions that may be called "special investigative units" or SIUs. Fraud investigators look for signs or evidence that a claim is false or fraudulent and, should such evidence be found, the insurance company can use the finding to deny payment of the claim or refer the matter to law enforcement for possible criminal prosecution.

When an insurance company's fraud department investigates a fraud claim, they frequently proceed in two stages: pre-contact and post-contact. The pre-contact stage occurs prior to contact with the claimant, and involves collection and analysis of all available documentation and evidence pertaining to the claim, potentially including the taking of witness statements or collection of evidence from third-party sources. Then, in the "post-contact" stage, they interview the claimant to gather more information and, when possible, an admission that the claim is fraudulent. The goal of the investigation and interview is to verify the value of the claim and, should fraud be identified, collect evidence of the insured party's intent to defraud. or the intention to defraud, An interview with the insured may also be used to challenge subsequent changes to the insured's narrative.

== Worldwide ==
National and local governments, especially in the last half of the twentieth century, have recognized insurance fraud as a serious crime, and have made efforts to punish and prevent this practice.

=== Canada ===
In British Columbia, any person who submits a motor vehicle insurance claim that contains false or misleading information may be fined, imprisoned, or both.

The Insurance Crime Prevention Bureau is a nonprofit organization that was founded in 1973 to help fight insurance fraud. This organization collects information on insurance fraud, and also carries out investigations. Approximately one third of these investigations result in criminal conviction, one third result in denial of the claim, and one third result in payment of the claim.

=== United Kingdom ===
The UK has broad, general criminal provisions that make fraud punishable as a crime, The Fraud Act of 2006 specifically defines fraud as a crime, committed when a person "makes a false representation", "fails to disclose to another person information which he is under a legal duty to disclose", or abuses a position in which a person is "expected to safeguard, or not to act against, the financial interests of another person".

The Serious Fraud Office was established by the government in 1987 to improve the investigation and prosecution of serious and complex fraud cases. The City of London Police runs an Insurance Fraud Enforcement Department, that specializes in tracking criminals who knowingly commit insurance fraud.

Part 4 of the Insurance Act 2015 codifies the common law principle that an insurer is not obligated to pay a fraudulent claim, and may recover payments already made from the insured should fraud later be discovered. Upon proper notice to the insured, the insurer may also treat the insurance contract as if it was terminated at the time of the "fraudulent act". Neither "fraud" nor "fraudulent claim" is defined in the legislation. In an important legal judgment in this area, the Supreme Court ruled in 2016 that false information being used to support a genuine claim for loss did not in itself make the claim fraudulent, and so the forfeiture rules did not apply. The majority ruling in the Supreme Court differed from the findings of the trial court and the Appeal Court, which had seen the false information as a "reckless misrepresentation" and maintained a public policy interest against use of false claim information.

=== United States ===
Insurance fraud may be prosecuted as a crime in all states, whether under general fraud statutes or those that specifically pertain to insurance claims and coverage. The federal government has passed a statute that criminalizes the act of defrauding a health care benefit plan, Section 1347 of Title 18 of the United States Code.

== See also ==
- Moral hazard
- Anti-fraud
- False billing
- Federal Bureau of Investigation
- Florida Division of Insurance Fraud
- Show jumping horse killings
- United States Postal Inspection Service
