= North Fort Myers High School =

Public high school in Fort Myers, Florida, United States

Coordinates: 26.663405°N 81.9136982°W

- 5000 Orange Grove Blvd; North Fort Myers, Florida; United States

Information
- Type: Public Secondary School
- Established: 1960
- School district: Lee County School District
- Principal: Christopher Drake
- Staff: 79.07 (FTE)
- Grades: 9-12
- Enrollment: 1,938 (2024-2025)
- Student to teacher ratio: 23.16
- Colors: Red, white, and black
- Mascot: Red Knight
- Website: North Fort Myers High School

North Fort Myers High School (commonly called "North" or "North High") is an American 9-12 high school located in North Fort Myers, Florida. It is the official center for the arts and media for the West Zone in Lee County's School Choice Program; is part of the Lee County School District; and currently serves approximately 1572 students. The official school colors are red, & white and the athletic teams are known as "The Red Knights". North Fort Myers High School offers AICE, Advanced Placement, Dual Enrollment, Vocational, Honors and general education classes, in addition to its Arts & Media program and the North High Collegiate Academy.

In 2009, North High was awarded a grade of "A" by the Florida Department of Education. North was the only school in the Lee County School District to be awarded an A rating for both 2007-2008 and 2008–2009 academic school years.

On December 7, 2009, North High launched a new version of its school web site. With the new site, students at North are given the ability to create and manage online student portfolios, allowing them to post work done during the school year. Currently, over 950 items have been uploaded by more than 85 North High students. The student work can be viewed here.

In February, 2010, the school added the University of Cambridge's AICE program to its curriculum offerings. The Advanced International Certificate of Education is a specialized, English language curriculum offered to students in the higher levels of secondary school intended to prepare them for success at the university level. Students who complete the requirements of the program will earn a Cambridge AICE diploma, and are automatically eligible for the maximum Florida Bright Futures scholarship.

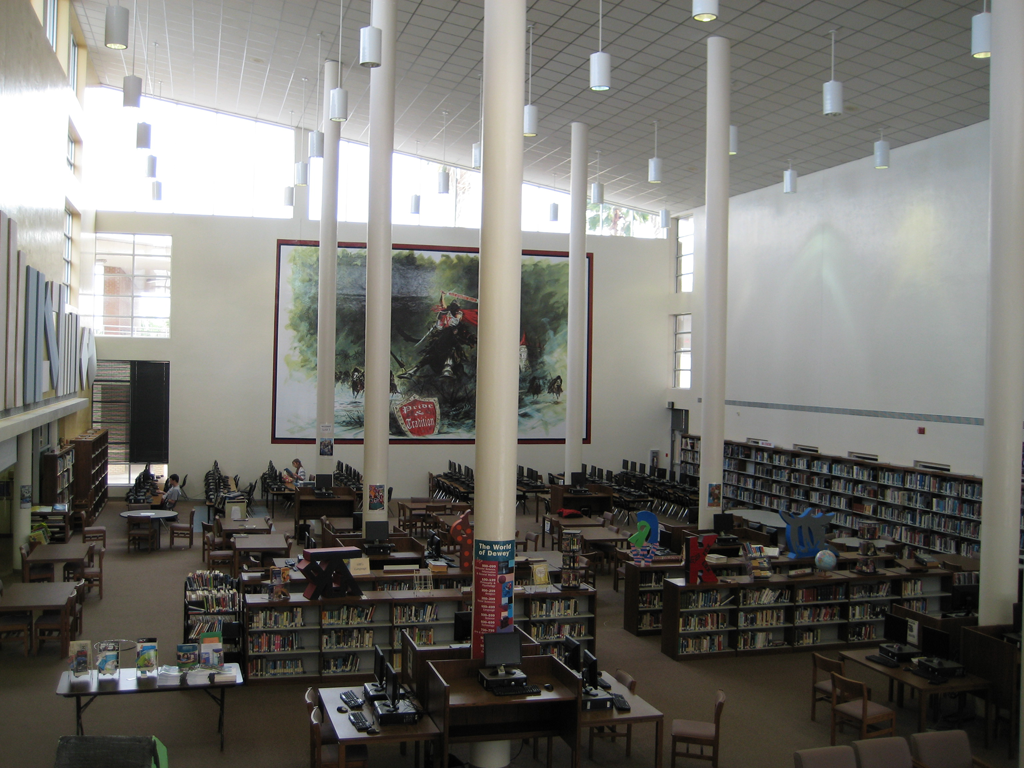
Media Center

SuperLab

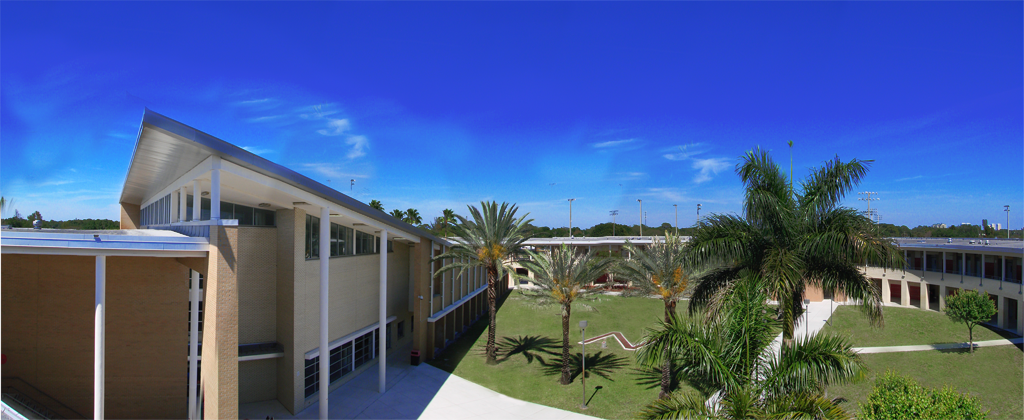
North High campus

== History ==
North Fort Myers High School was established in 1962 as a segregated school for white students and renovated in 1995. In the 2008–2009 school year, North High met 97% of the Adequate Yearly Progress (AYP) criteria as defined by the No Child Left Behind (NCLB) Act.

There are a total of 84 teachers on staff at North, and 31 (37%) hold a master's degree or higher. In addition, ten (10) teachers (12%) are adjunct professors at Florida SouthWestern State College. With so many teachers possessing this qualification, North High is able to offer the most dual enrollment (DE) courses on its campus of all the high schools in the district.

The school currently houses approximately 1,572 students. In 2008, the student population consisted of approximately 23% minority, 12% gifted, and 38% of students qualified for free and reduced lunch. In 2004, North High was named as a Center for the Arts and Media. Today, there are approximately 450 students enrolled in the arts and media program majoring in theatre arts, media arts, instrumental music, vocal music, strings, visual art, or dance.

From 2002 to 2009, North High was the number one chosen high school in the West Zone. Incoming freshmen have the opportunity to attend an orientation camp in August, where students learn about North High programs, clubs, and school traditions.

North Fort Myers High School was integrated in 1969. The administration of the school resisted, even pretending not to recognize a black basketball coach and directing the police to attack him with dogs.

== Academic standing ==
=== School grades and SIP goals ===
In 2009, North High was awarded a grade of "A" by the Florida DOE. North was the only high school in the Lee County School District to be awarded an A rating for both 2008 and 2009. In 2008, North Fort Myers High School was awarded a grade of "A" by the Florida Department of Education. The 2007–08 academic year marked the first time in school history that North High had received an "A" rating.

Year	Grade	% Meeting High Standards in Reading	% Meeting High Standards in Math	% Meeting High Standards in Writing	% Meeting High Standards in Science	% Making Reading Gains	% Making Math Gains	% of Lowest 25% Making Learning Gains in Reading	% of Lowest 25% Making Learning Gains in Math	Bonus points for 11th-12th grade retakes	Total points earned	District rank (pts)
2009	A	58	81	91	35	61	83	59	68	10	546	2nd
2008	A	50	80	89	32	59	82	51	72	10	525	3rd
2007	C	46	73	87	33	54	75	44	64	--	475	4th
2006	B	43	75	87	--	57	78	57	--	--	397	3rd
2005	D	37	71	91	--	46	73	48	--	--	366	7th
2004	C	39	67	90	--	46	74	45	--	--	361	6th

=== FCAT ===
The Florida Comprehensive Assessment Test, or the FCAT, is the standardized test used in the primary and secondary public schools of Florida. First administered statewide in 1998[1], it replaced the State Student Assessment Test (SSAT) and the High School Competency Test (HSCT).

Year	Grade	Reading %	Math %
2009	9	62%	77%
2008	9	53%	77%
2007	9	47%	66%
2006	9	44%	65%

Year	Grade	Reading %	Math %
2009	10	47%	77%
2008	10	42%	76%
2007	10	36%	72%
2006	10	34%	76%

Year	Grade	Science %
2009	11	32%
2008	11	29%
2007	11	30%
2006	11	34%

=== FCAT writing ===
Year	Mean Writing SS	% Levels 3 - 5	Combined Mean Sc	% >= 3.5	% >= 4.0	# of students	AYP >= 3.0	District ranking
2009	N/A	N/A	4.2	88	77	N/A	N/A	1st
2008	318	62	4.1	86	70	539	96	2nd
2007	303	52	4	81	69	441	95	4th
2006	308	N/A	4.1	85	70	453	94	2nd

== Center for Arts & Media ==
North High is the official Arts Center in the West Zone. The Arts Center offers a variety of courses in visual, performing, and media arts. Students who are currently enrolled in high school or who are currently enrolled in eighth grade are eligible to audition and participate in the arts program.

== Animation and Game Development Academy ==
North High's Animation and Game Development Academy (AGDA) introduces students to the fundamental principles of game and simulation development. This program is a four-year sequence of project-based courses oriented to game and simulation development that align relevant academic, employment, and workplace standards.

== Business & Technology Education ==
The focus of North High's Technology & Career Education Department is to make students aware of the many changes in technology. Through its courses in Accounting Applications, Computing for College and Careers, Administrative Office Technology, Digital Design, and Cooperative Business Education, instruction is provided to help the students handle various challenges in today's society. Completion of a three-course program can qualify a student for the Bright Futures-Gold Seal Scholarship.

== Technology ==
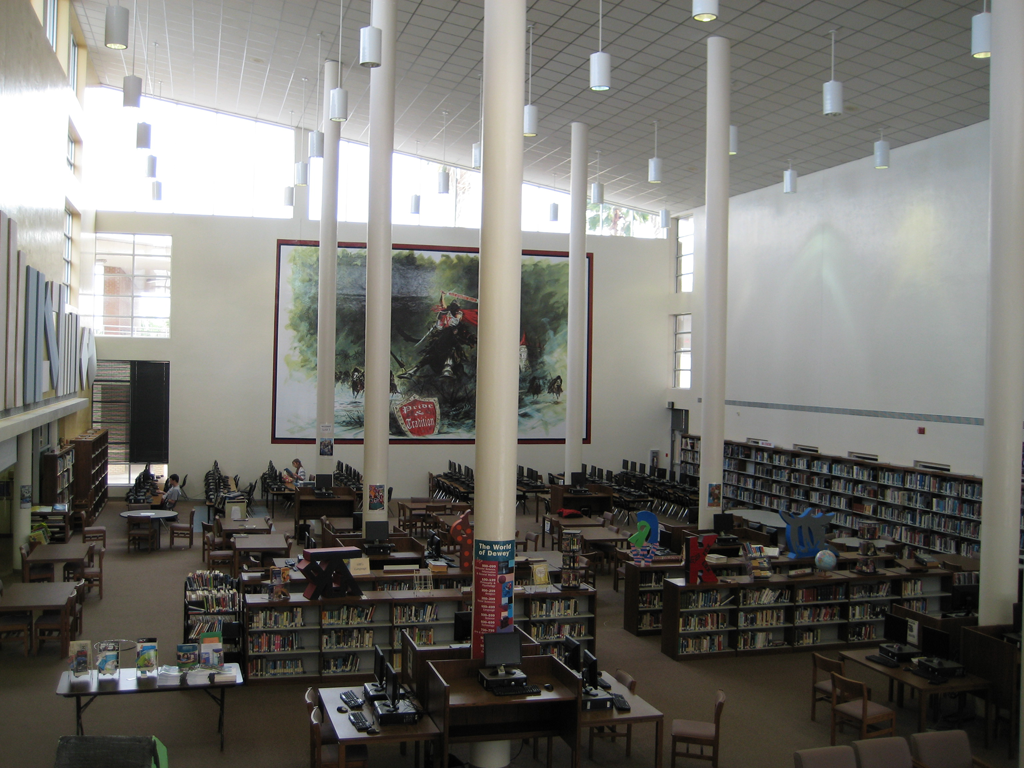
North High Media Center

There are currently over 500 computers on the North High campus that are accessible by students. Almost all of those are located in student classrooms that have been set up specifically for use as a computer lab. The classroom labs vary in size, but most are set up with 32 stations.

North High SuperLab

== Notable alumni ==
North High has produced several notable alumni:

- Tommy Bohanon, Retired NFL Fullback
- Tre Boston, NFL Free Agent
- Jeff Bowen, Obie Award-winning composer, lyricist and actor
- Brad Branson, Former Professional Basketball Player. NBA, CBA, Real Madrid, Pamesa Valencia
- Noel Devine, running back for the Montreal Alouettes
- Richard Fain, former defensive back for the Cincinnati Bengals, Phoenix Cardinals, and Chicago Bears
- Mike Greenwell, former professional baseball player, played his entire career with the Boston Red Sox
- Jevon Kearse, former defensive end for the Tennessee Titans and Philadelphia Eagles
- Jeff Kottkamp, former Lt. Governor of Florida
- Craig Leon, Grammy Award-winning composer and record producer. Producer of the Ramones, Blondie, Luciano Pavarotti and Joshua Bell
- George McNeill, American professional golfer and two-time winner on the PGA Tour
- Jim Miller, a pitcher for the New York Yankees
- Alfie Oakes, founder and owner of Oakes Farms and State Committeeman for the Republican Party of Florida
- Deion Sanders, former National Football League cornerback, Major League Baseball player, and CBS Sports commentator. Current head football coach University of Colorado
- Chad Senior, 2000 Modern Pentathlon World Championships, 15th (individual); relay, team event, 1st
- Warren Williams, former running back for the Pittsburgh Steelers and Indianapolis Colts

=== Notable faculty ===
- Earnest Graham, Former head coach of the school's varsity football team
