= Florida Division of Insurance Fraud =

Badge of the Division of Insurance Fraud

Established by the Florida state legislature in 1976, the Division of Insurance Fraud is the law enforcement arm of the Department of Financial Services and is responsible for investigating insurance fraud; crimes associated with claim fraud, insurance premium fraud, workers' compensation claim fraud, workers’ compensation premium avoidance and diversions, insurer insolvency fraud, unauthorized insurance entity fraud and insurance agent crimes. The law enforcement detectives of the Division of Insurance Fraud also investigate viatical settlement application fraud, defalcations of escrow funds held in trust by title insurance firms, and non-Medicaid related health care fraud.

== Overview ==
According to a 2007-2008 report from the Coalition Against Insurance Fraud (CAIF), Florida's Division of Insurance Fraud led the nation in the recovery of insurance fraud related losses through court ordered restitution. In Fiscal Year 2008/2009, cases presented for prosecution by the Division of Insurance Fraud resulted in more than $34 million in court ordered restitution. According to the coalition's 2007-2008 statistics, Florida ranks in the top four among all states’ fraud divisions and bureaus in key measurements of success:

- 2nd in the number of arrests
- 3rd in the number of cases presented for prosecution
- 4th in the number of referrals

== Accomplishments ==
During fiscal year 2008/2009, investigative efforts by the Division of Insurance Fraud resulted in 982 cases presented for prosecution, 834 arrests, and 532 convictions. Also during Fiscal Year 2008/2009, the Division of Insurance Fraud received and reviewed 12,084 insurance fraud referrals and opened 1,971 cases for investigation.

== See also ==
- Coalition Against Insurance Fraud
