= Prime Time (Deion Sanders album) =

Studio album by Deion Sanders
- Released: December 26, 1994
- Recorded: 1993–1994
- Genre: G-Funk
- Length: 59:52
- Labels: Bust It; Capitol
- Producers: Dallas Austin, The Whole 9, The Hines Brothers (Andra Hines & Dunkin Hines)

Deion Sanders chronology
| Prime Time (1994) | The Encore Remix (2005) |

Singles from Prime Time
- 1. "Must Be The Money" Released: December 24, 1994

Prime Time is the debut album by NFL Hall of Famer and MLB star Deion Sanders, released in December 1994, on Hammer's Bust It Records and distributed by Capitol Records.

The album peaked at No. 70 on the Top R&B/Hip-Hop Albums and No. 14 on the Top Heatseekers.

== Background ==
The album was released on December 26, 1994, by Capitol Records, via Hammer's Bust It Records label. Despite universally negative reviews, the album reached No. 70 on the Top R&B/Hip-Hop Albums and No. 14 on the Top Heatseekers. "Must Be the Money", a take on Secret Weapon's 80s hit "Must Be the Music", was the only single released, but failed to make it on the charts.

Sanders performed a medley of songs from the album (including "Must Be the Money" and "It's On"), while hosting during the twentieth season of Saturday Night Live on February 18, 1995.

The Encore Remix (2005) is a remix album by Sanders on Bungalo Records. It featured a remix for every song Prime Time. The album featured the song "Straight To My Feet", and two versions of Sanders' song, "Must Be the Money".

== Critical reception ==
Professional ratings
Review scores
| Source | Rating |
|---|---|
| Allmusic | 1.5/5 stars |

AllMusic panned the album, lamenting that the "dual-sport superstar Deion Sanders didn't bring the same game to the recording studio as he did to the playing field ...it's not just for sports fans -- it's not for anyone.

== Track listing ==
1. "Time for Prime" – :30
2. "Prime Time Keeps On Ticking" – 4:09
3. "Y U NV ME?" – 4:15
4. "Must Be The Money" – 4:17
5. "It's All Real" – 4:24
6. "2 B Me" – 3:52
7. "Say Hi to the Bad Guy" – 4:17
8. "We Can Roll" – 4:10
9. "House of Prime" – 4:06
10. "It Ain't Ovr Yet" – 3:31
11. "Movin'" – 3:51
12. "Heidy Heidy Hey" – 4:02
13. "Papa San" – 5:16
14. "Sum'n About That Woman" – 4:48
15. "It's On" – 3:54
16. "Time for Prime (Reprise)" – :30
