= Straight to My Feet =

1994 single by Hammer

Single by Hammer

from the album Street Fighter
- Genre: West Coast hip-hop; Pop rap; G-funk
- Length: 3:58
- Label: Capitol
- Songwriters: Stanley Kirk Burrell; Deion Sanders

Hammer singles chronology
"Pumps and a Bump" (1994)	"Straight to My Feet" (1994)	"Sultry Funk" (1995)

Music video
- "Straight to my Feet" on YouTube

"Straight to My Feet" is a song performed by American rapper Hammer featuring athlete Deion Sanders. It was released as the theme song to the 1994 film Street Fighter starring Jean-Claude Van Damme. The song reached number 57 in the UK charts.

== Critical reception ==
The song received a mostly negative reception from critics. Larry Flick from Billboard magazine wrote in a positive review, "First single from the soundtrack to the new Jean-Claude Van Damme movie, Street Fighter, kicks a funk-fortified new jack pace, balancing Hammer's familiar rhyming with soulful singing at the chorus. Infectious booty jam will pave the way at radio for an album filled with catchy potential hits. Look for the forthcoming eye-popping video clip."

== Music video ==
The music video for "Straight to My Feet" was directed by Craig S. Brooks and features the cast from the movie.

== Charts ==
Chart (1995)	Peak position
Australia (ARIA)	175
UK Singles (Official Charts)	57
UK Hip Hop/R&B (Official Charts)	10
