= Tre Boston =

American football player (born 1992)

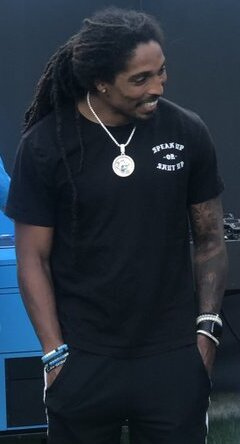
- Boston in 2019

No. 33, 38
- Position: Safety

Personal information
- Born: June 25, 1992 (age 34); Fort Myers, Florida, U.S.
- Listed height: 6 ft 0 in (1.83 m)
- Listed weight: 205 lb (93 kg)

Career information
- High school: North Fort Myers (North Fort Myers, Florida)
- College: North Carolina (2010–2013)
- NFL draft: 2014: 4th round, 128th overall pick

Career history
- Carolina Panthers (2014–2016); Los Angeles Chargers (2017); Arizona Cardinals (2018); Carolina Panthers (2019–2020)

Awards and highlights
- Second-team All-ACC (2013)

Career NFL statistics
- Total tackles: 429
- Sacks: 3
- Forced fumbles: 2
- Pass deflections: 42
- Interceptions: 15
- Defensive touchdowns: 1
- Stats at Pro Football Reference

Jayestin Tre'Von Boston Sr. (born June 25, 1992) is an American former professional football safety and current TV host. He played college football at North Carolina, and was selected by the Carolina Panthers in the fourth round of the 2014 NFL draft. He also played for the Los Angeles Chargers and Arizona Cardinals.

== Early life ==
Boston attended North Fort Myers High School in North Fort Myers, Florida. As a junior, he posted 41 tackles with 16 solo stops, 4 interceptions on defense and caught 43 passes for 736 yards and 5 touchdowns on offense. He was named first-team all-area at defensive back his final two seasons. He was named MVP of the John Carrigan Rotary South All-Star Classic in Ft. Myers in December 2009. He scored 17 touchdowns as a senior, including 11 rushing, five receiving, and one on defense. He led his team with 103 carries for 841 yards, and also had 24 receptions for 364 yards. Defensively, he intercepted six passes for 119 yards and recovered one fumble.

Considered a three-star recruit by Rivals.com, he was rated as the 80th best cornerback prospect of his class.

College recruiting
| Name | Hometown | School | Height | Weight | 40^{‡} | Commit date |
|---|---|---|---|---|---|---|
| Tre Boston; CB | North Ft. Myers, Florida | North Fort Myers High School | 6 ft 1 in (1.85 m) | 175 lb (79 kg) | 4.41 | Jan 29, 2010 |
| Tre Boston; CB | Recruit ratings: Scout: Rivals: 247Sports: (76) | | | | | |
Overall recruit ranking: Scout: 17 (S) Rivals: 80 (CB) ESPN: 129 (ATH)
‡ Refers to 40-yard dash; Note: In many cases, Scout, Rivals, 247Sports, On3, and ESPN may conflict in their listings of height, weight and 40 time.; In these cases, the average was taken. ESPN grades are on a 100-point scale.; Sources: "North Carolina Football Commitments". Rivals.; "2010 North Carolina Football Recruiting Commits". Scout.; "Scout.com Team Recruiting Rankings". Scout.; "2010 Team Ranking". Rivals.com.

== College career ==
As a true freshman at UNC, Boston started 4 games as a cornerback and played in 10 games overall. He finished the season with 32 tackles, four pass breakups, two forced fumbles and one interception. During the Chick-fil-A Kickoff Game against LSU, Boston posted three tackles, forced two fumbles, broke up a pass and made an interception.

As a sophomore, Boston finished the season third on the team with 70 tackles, including 48 primary stops, and led the team with three interceptions for 20 yards. He also broke up 2 passes, recovered 2 fumbles, and forced a fumble. He tied for sixth in the Atlantic Coast Conference (ACC) with 3 interceptions. In the Independence Bowl against Missouri, Boston posted 6 tackles.

In his junior season, Boston earned an honorable mention All-ACC honors from both the media and the coaches. He started all 12 games at safety and led the team in tackles with 86 stops on the year, including 49 solo tackles, and added six pass breakups. He also shared the team lead in interceptions with four and returned one for a touchdown. He was also awarded ACC Defensive Back of the Week twice after games against Miami and Virginia. Against Duke, Boston registered a career-high 17 tackles and an interception, including 8 solo tackles. During his senior season, Boston earned second-team All-ACC honors at safety after finishing the regular season with a team-high 85 tackles and four interceptions.

== Professional career ==
External videos
- Tre Boston's NFL Combine Workout

Pre-draft measurables
| Height | Weight | Arm length | Hand span | 40-yard dash | 10-yard split | 20-yard split | 20-yard shuttle | Three-cone drill | Vertical jump | Broad jump | Bench press |
|---|---|---|---|---|---|---|---|---|---|---|---|
| 5 ft 11 5/8 in (1.82 m) | 204 lb (93 kg) | 31 3/8 in (0.80 m) | 9 3/4 in (0.25 m) | 4.59 s | 1.60 s | 2.69 s | 4.31 s | 7.04 s | 35 in (0.89 m) | 9 ft 8 in (2.95 m) | 18 reps |
All values from NFL Combine

=== Carolina Panthers (first stint) ===
==== 2014 ====
The Carolina Panthers selected Boston in the fourth round (128th overall) in the 2014 NFL draft. He was the tenth safety drafted in 2014. On May 21, 2014, the Panthers signed Boston to a four-year, $2.62 million contract that includes a signing bonus of $101,367.

On June 4, 2014, it was reported that Boston underwent sports hernia surgery and would miss organized team activities after sustaining the injuring during rookie minicamp. On July 29, 2014, the Panthers activated Boston off of their physically unable to perform list. Boston suffered an injury during their first practice. Throughout training camp, Boston competed to be a backup safety against Robert Lester and Colin Jones. Head coach Ron Rivera named Boston the backup free safety, behind Thomas DeCoud, to begin the regular season.

Boston was inactive for the entire preseason and also missed the first five (Weeks 1–5) regular season games due to a groin injury. On October 12, 2014, Boston made his NFL debut during the Panthers' 37–37 tie at the Cincinnati Bengals in Week 6. On October 30, 2014, Boston earned his first career start after Thomas DeCoud was ruled inactive due to a hamstring injury. He finished the Panthers' 28–10 loss to the New Orleans Saints with a season-high seven combined tackles in Week 9. Boston and cornerback Bene Benwikere became starters in Week 14 after defensive coordinator Sean McDermott opted to bench free safety Thomas DeCoud and cornerback Antoine Cason. On December 28, 2014, Boston recorded two solo tackles, broke up a pass, and returned his first career interception for the first touchdown of his career during a 34–3 win at the Atlanta Falcons. Boston made his first career interception off a pass attempt by Matt Ryan and returned it for an 84-yard touchdown in the third quarter. He finished his rookie season in 2014 with 26 combined tackles (18 solo), three pass deflections, one interception, and one touchdown in 11 games and five starts. Boston missed just one tackle and allowed just five receptions on 222 coverage snaps as a rookie, which ranked fourth-best among all safeties in 2014.

The Panthers won their last four regular season games after benching DeCoud and Cason in favor of Boston and Benwikere. They finished first in the NFC South with a 7–8–1 record and earned a playoff berth. On January 3, 2015, Boston started in his first career playoff game and made two combined tackles, deflected a pass, and made an interception during a 27–16 win against the Arizona Cardinals in the NFC Wildcard Game. The following week, he recorded three solo tackles in the Panthers' 31–17 loss at the Seattle Seahawks in the NFC Divisional Round.

==== 2015 ====
Boston entered training camp in 2015 slated as the starting free safety, but saw competition from Kurt Coleman. Rivera named Boston the backup free safety to start the regular season, behind Coleman. In Week 4, he collected a season-high six combined tackles during a 37–23 win at the Tampa Bay Buccaneers. He finished the 2015 NFL season with 29 combined tackles (21 solo) in 16 games and one start.

The Panthers finished first in the NFC South with a 15–1 record and earned a first round bye. On January 17, 2016, Boston recorded two solo tackles and made his first career sack on quarterback Russell Wilson during a 31–24 win against the Seahawks in the NFC Divisional Round. The following week, he recorded one tackle, one pass deflection, and intercepted a pass by quarterback Carson Palmer during the fourth quarter of the Carolina Panthers' 49–15 victory against the Cardinals in the NFC Championship Game. On February 7, 2016, Boston appeared in Super Bowl 50 and made one tackle and was responsible for two penalties as the Panthers lost 24–10 to the Denver Broncos.

==== 2016 ====
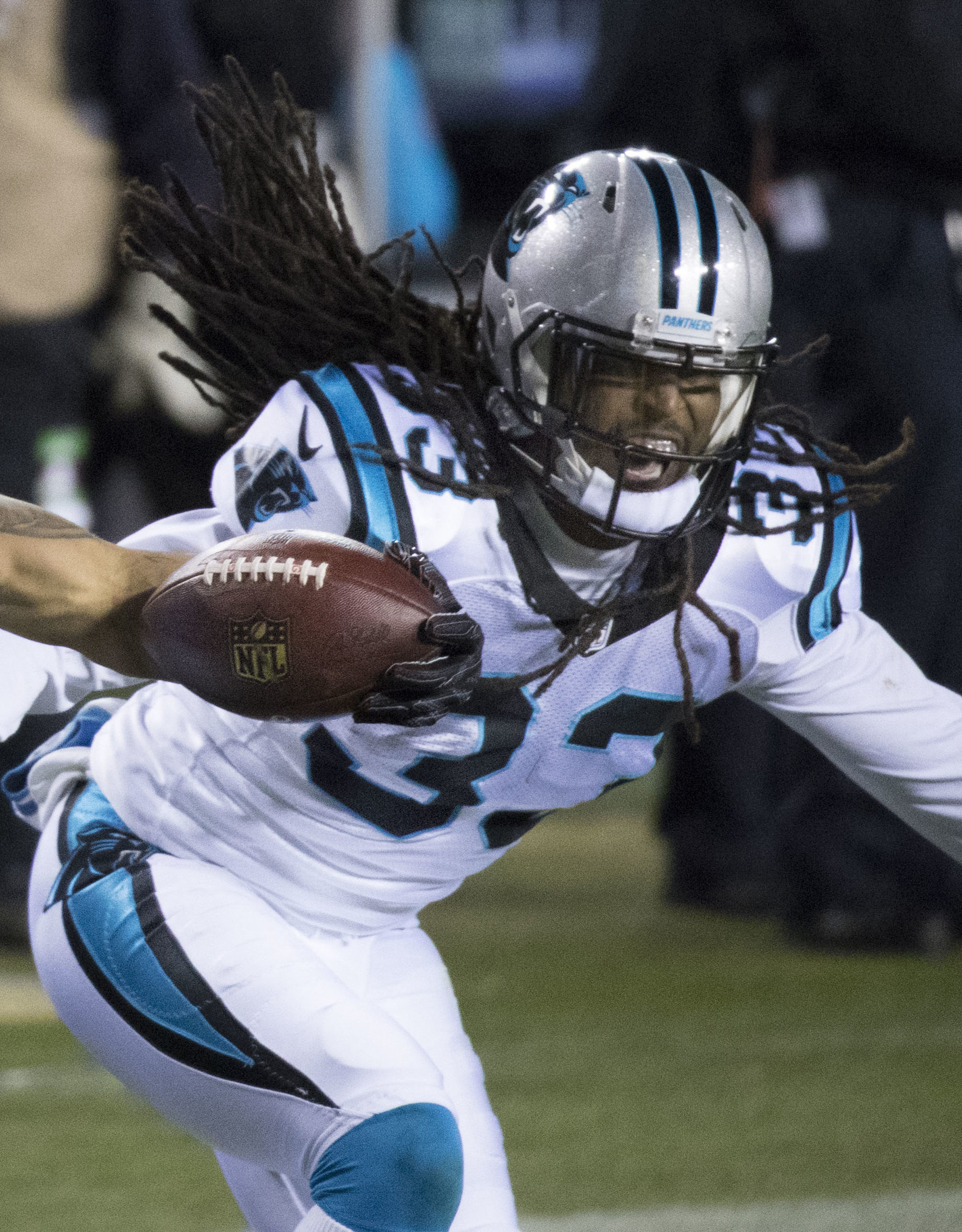
Boston with the Carolina Panthers in 2016

Throughout training camp, Boston competed against Dean Marlowe to be a starting safety after a spot was left available after the departure of Roman Harper. Rivera named Boston the starting free safety to begin the regular season, alongside Coleman.

He started in the Panthers' season-opener at the Broncos and recorded four solo tackles, deflected a pass, and made his second career sack in the Panthers' 21–20 loss. Boston made the sack on Broncos' quarterback Trevor Siemian for a ten-yard loss in the fourth quarter. In Week 12, he collected a season-high seven combined tackles during a 35-32 loss at the Oakland Raiders. On December 27, 2016, the Carolina Panthers placed Boston on injured reserve due to a knee injury. He finished the 2016 NFL season with 53 combined tackles (38 solo), seven pass deflections, two interceptions, and two sacks in 15 games and ten starts. Boston shared the starting role with Michael Griffin and Colin Jones during the season.

On May 2, 2017, Boston was waived by the Panthers.

=== Los Angeles Chargers ===
On May 15, 2017, the Los Angeles Chargers signed Boston to a one-year, $900,000 contract. Throughout training camp, Boston competed to be the starting free safety against Dwight Lowery. Head coach Anthony Lynn named Boston the starting free safety to begin the season, alongside strong safety Jahleel Addae.

In Week 2, Boston collected a season-high nine combined tackles in the Chargers' 19–17 loss to the Miami Dolphins. On November 12, 2017, he recorded six combined tackles, made a season-high three pass deflections, and intercepted a pass by quarterback Blake Bortles during a 20–17 loss at the Jacksonville Jaguars in Week 10.

=== Arizona Cardinals ===
The Arizona Cardinals signed Boston to a $1.5 million deal. Boston competed to be the starting strong safety against Budda Baker to play alongside free safety Antoine Bethea. Defensive coordinator Al Holcomb decided to move Budda Baker to nickelback after Boston's arrival.

External videos
- Boston dives for INT off Mitch Trubisky

In Week 3 against the Chicago Bears, Boston intercepted quarterback Mitchell Trubisky and made five tackles in the 16–14 loss. On September 30, 2018, Boston collected a career-high 11 solo tackles in the Cardinals' 20–17 loss to the Seahawks in Week 4. The following week, he made six solo tackles, a season-high three pass deflections, and made an interception during a 28–18 win at the San Francisco 49ers. He finished the season with 79 tackles, nine pass deflections, three interceptions, and a forced fumble. His 79 tackles finished fourth on the team and his nine pass deflections led the team.

=== Carolina Panthers (second stint) ===
On July 31, 2019, Boston signed a one-year deal to return to the Panthers. He started all 16 games, playing all defensive snaps, recording 68 tackles, three interceptions, and a career-high 11 pass deflections.

On March 19, 2020, Boston signed a three-year, $18 million contract extension with the Panthers.

On March 17, 2021, Boston was released by the Panthers.

== NFL career statistics ==
Legend
| **Bold** | Career high |

=== Regular season ===
| Year | Team | Games | | Tackles | | | | | Interceptions | | | | | Fumbles | | | |
| Year | Team | GP | GS | Cmb | Solo | Ast | Sck | TFL | Int | Yds | TD | Lng | PD | FF | FR | Yds | TD |
|---|---|---|---|---|---|---|---|---|---|---|---|---|---|---|---|---|---|
| 2014 | CAR | 11 | 5 | 26 | 18 | 8 | 0.0 | 1 | 1 | **84** | **1** | **84** | 3 | 0 | 0 | 0 | 0 |
| 2015 | CAR | **16** | 1 | 29 | 21 | 8 | 0.0 | 3 | 0 | 0 | 0 | 0 | 0 | 0 | 0 | 0 | 0 |
| 2016 | CAR | 15 | 10 | 53 | 38 | 15 | **2.0** | **5** | 2 | 29 | 0 | 22 | 7 | 0 | 0 | 0 | 0 |
| 2017 | LAC | **16** | 15 | 79 | 56 | 23 | 0.0 | 1 | **5** | 49 | 0 | 25 | 8 | 0 | 0 | 0 | 0 |
| 2018 | ARI | 14 | 13 | 79 | **66** | 13 | 0.0 | 1 | 3 | 9 | 0 | 9 | 9 | **1** | 1 | 0 | 0 |
| 2019 | CAR | **16** | **16** | 68 | 53 | 15 | 0.0 | 1 | 3 | 20 | 0 | 20 | **11** | 0 | 0 | 0 | 0 |
| 2020 | CAR | **16** | **16** | **95** | 61 | **34** | 1.0 | 3 | 1 | 0 | 0 | 0 | 4 | **1** | **2** | 0 | 0 |
| | | 104 | 76 | 429 | 313 | 116 | 3.0 | 15 | 15 | 191 | 1 | 84 | 42 | 2 | 3 | 0 | 0 |

=== Playoffs ===
| Year | Team | Games | | Tackles | | | | | Interceptions | | | | | Fumbles | | | |
| Year | Team | GP | GS | Cmb | Solo | Ast | Sck | TFL | Int | Yds | TD | Lng | PD | FF | FR | Yds | TD |
|---|---|---|---|---|---|---|---|---|---|---|---|---|---|---|---|---|---|
| 2014 | CAR | 2 | **2** | **5** | **4** | **1** | 0.0 | 0 | **1** | **11** | 0 | **11** | **1** | 0 | 0 | 0 | 0 |
| 2015 | CAR | **3** | 0 | 4 | 3 | **1** | **1.0** | **1** | **1** | 5 | 0 | 5 | **1** | 0 | **1** | 0 | 0 |
| | | 5 | 2 | 9 | 7 | 2 | 1.0 | 1 | 2 | 16 | 0 | 11 | 2 | 0 | 1 | 0 | 0 |

== After football ==
He was named co-host for the ACC Network show ACC PM.

In 2023, Boston and his wife Cierra became hosts of Fast: Home Rescue, a home renovation show airing on The Weather Channel where the Bostons and their team of home experts rebuild homes damaged by storms and other natural disasters.

== Personal life ==
Boston is a Christian. Boston is married to Cierra Boston. They have two children.
