= Deion Sanders =

American football coach and former player (born 1967)

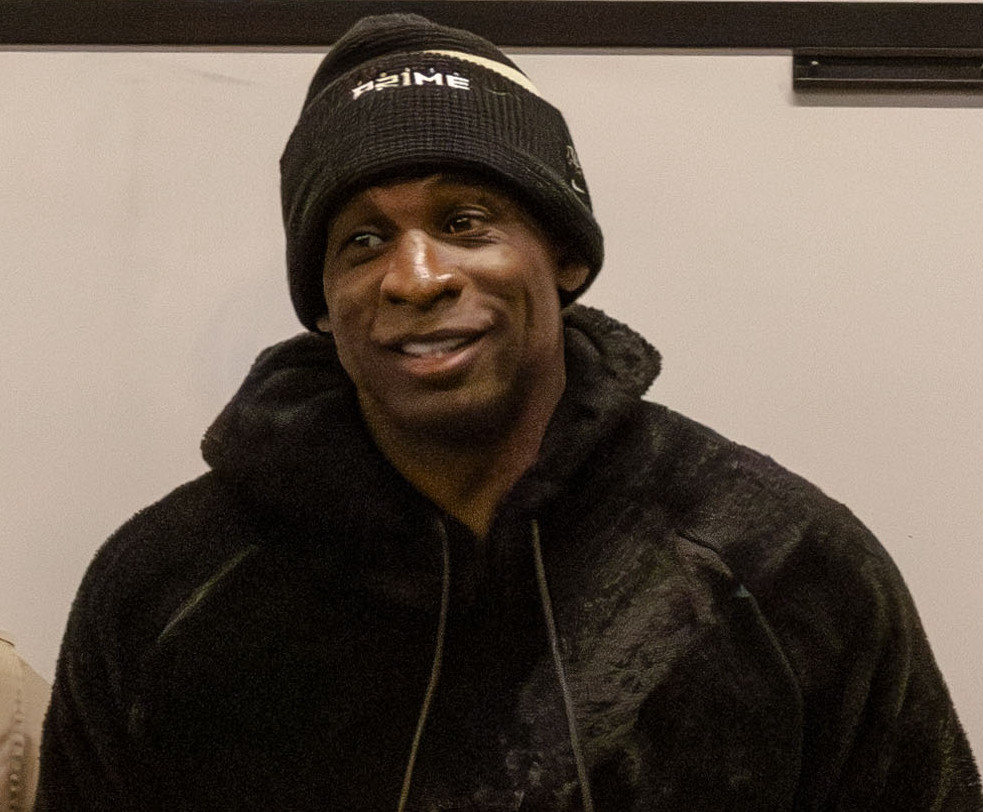
- Sanders as Colorado Buffaloes head coach, 2024

Colorado Buffaloes
- Title: Head coach

Personal information
- Born: August 9, 1967 (age 59); Fort Myers, Florida, U.S.
- Listed height: 6 ft 1 in (1.85 m)
- Listed weight: 195 lb (88 kg)

Career information
- Position: Cornerback (No. 21, 37)
- High school: North Fort Myers (North Fort Myers, Florida)
- College: Florida State (1985–1988)
- NFL draft: 1989: 1st round, 5th overall pick

Career history

Playing
- Atlanta Falcons (1989–1993); San Francisco 49ers (1994); Dallas Cowboys (1995–1999); Washington Redskins (2000); Baltimore Ravens (2004–2005)

Coaching
- Prime Prep Academy (2012–2013) Head coach; Triple A Academy (2015–2016) Head coach; Trinity Christian (2017–2019) Offensive coordinator; Jackson State (2020–2022) Head coach; Colorado (2023–present) Head coach

Awards and highlights
- Playing: 2× Super Bowl champion (XXIX, XXX); NFL Defensive Player of the Year (1994); 6× First-team All-Pro (1992–1994, 1996–1998); 2× Second-team All-Pro (1991, 1999); 8× Pro Bowl (1991–1994, 1996–1999); NFL kick return yards leader (1992); NFL 1990s All-Decade Team; NFL 100th Anniversary All-Time Team; PFWA All-Rookie Team (1989); Atlanta Falcons Ring of Honor; Jim Thorpe Award (1988); 2× Unanimous All-American (1987, 1988); Third-team All-American (1986); NCAA average punt return yards leader (1988); First-team AP All-Time All-American (2025); Florida State Seminoles No. 2 honored; Coaching: 2× SWAC champion (2021, 2022); 2× SWAC East Division champion (2021, 2022); 2× SWAC Coach of the Year (2021, 2022); SI Sportsman of the Year (2023); Eddie Robinson Award (2021)

Career NFL statistics
- Tackles: 512
- Interception: 53
- Interception yards: 1,331
- Forced fumbles: 10
- Fumble recoveries: 13
- Punt return yards: 2,199
- Kick return yards: 3,523
- Receptions: 60
- Receiving yards: 784
- Touchdowns: 22
- Stats at Pro Football Reference

Head coaching record
- Career: 47–34 (.580) (college); 17–21 (.447) (high school)
- Pro Football Hall of Fame
- College Football Hall of Fame

Deion Luwynn Sanders Sr. (born August 9, 1967) is an American football coach and former player who is the head football coach at the University of Colorado Boulder. Nicknamed "Prime Time" and "Coach Prime", he played in the National Football League (NFL) for 14 seasons with the Atlanta Falcons, San Francisco 49ers, Dallas Cowboys, Washington Redskins, and Baltimore Ravens. Sanders was also a baseball outfielder for nine seasons in Major League Baseball (MLB) with the New York Yankees, Atlanta Braves, Cincinnati Reds, and San Francisco Giants. He won two Super Bowl titles and made one World Series appearance in 1992, making him the only athlete in history to play in both a Super Bowl and a World Series.

Sanders played college football for the Florida State Seminoles, winning the Jim Thorpe Award in 1988. He was selected by the Falcons fifth overall in the 1989 NFL draft. Primarily a cornerback, he received eight Pro Bowl and six first-team All-Pro selections. Sanders also made consecutive Super Bowl appearances in Super Bowl XXIX with the 49ers and Super Bowl XXX with the Cowboys, winning both. He was inducted to the Pro Football Hall of Fame and the College Football Hall of Fame in 2011.

After retiring as a player, Sanders pursued a sports analyst and coaching career. He served as the head coach at Jackson State University from 2020 to 2022, leading them to two consecutive Celebration Bowl appearances and the first undefeated regular season in school history. Sanders was named the head football coach of Colorado in 2023. He has gained publicity for the university and its football program, though the team's on-field success has been limited.

== Early life ==
Sanders was born on August 9, 1967, in Fort Myers, Florida, to Connie Sanders and Mims Sanders. His parents divorced when Sanders was two years old. Sanders was raised by his mother and her new husband, Willie Knight, whom Sanders credits with being influential in his life. He attended North Fort Myers High School, and was a letterman and All-State honoree in football, basketball and baseball. In 1985, Sanders was named to the Florida High School Association All-Century Team which selected the top 33 players in the 100-year history of high school football in the state.

The Kansas City Royals selected Sanders out of North Fort Myers High School in the sixth round of the 1985 Major League Baseball draft. Sanders decided to play with Florida State University instead of signing with the Kansas City Royals.

On the New Heights podcast, Sanders revealed his first name is spelled "Dion" but he started spelling it "Deion" when learning the nursery rhyme "Old MacDonald Had a Farm" as a child.

== College career ==
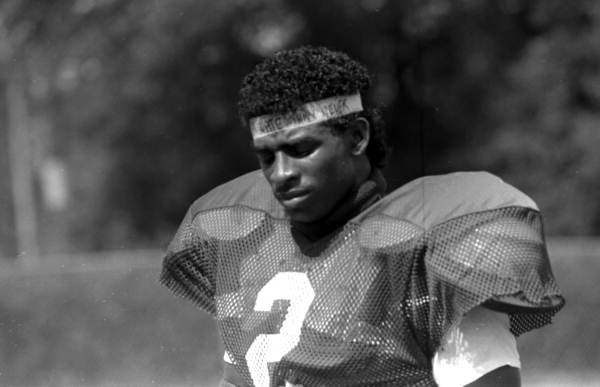
Sanders with the Florida State Seminoles football team, 1988

Sanders enrolled at Florida State University and played three sports for the Florida State Seminoles: football, baseball, and track. Beginning in his freshman year, he started in the Seminoles' secondary, played outfield for the baseball team that finished fifth in the nation, and helped lead the track and field team to a conference championship.

Under head coach Bobby Bowden, Sanders was a third-team All-American in 1986, and a two-time unanimous All-American cornerback in 1987 and 1988, intercepting 14 passes in his career, including three in bowl games, and managed to return one interception 100 yards for a touchdown, breaking Fred Biletnikoff's interception return record by one yard. He won the Jim Thorpe Award in 1988. He was also a standout punt returner for Florida State, leading the nation in 1988 with his punt return average, and breaking the school's record for career punt return yards. Sanders made an interception with five seconds left to seal Florida State's 13–7 win over Auburn in the 1989 Sugar Bowl during the 1988 postseason. Based on those accolades, his No. 2 jersey at Florida State was retired in 1995. He finished his career with 126 punt returns for 1,429 yards and three touchdowns, as well as 14 interceptions, returning them for 287 yards and three scores. At the end of his FSU career, Sanders' 14 interceptions was the second highest total in school history. Bowden would later state that Sanders was his "measuring stick for athletic ability".

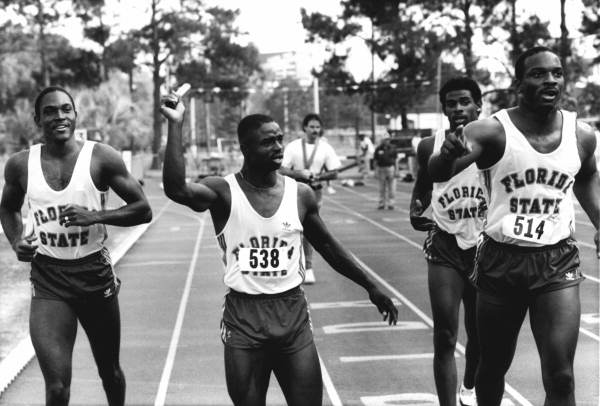
From left to right, Arthur Blake, Dexter Carter, Sanders and Sammie Smith taking a victory lap around Mike Long Track after setting a Metro Conference record in the 4 × 100 meter relay during a meet in 1988

While playing baseball under head coach Mike Martin at Florida State, Sanders' batting average was .331 in 1986. He also compiled 27 stolen bases in 1987.

On May 16, 1987, (while the Metro Conference baseball and track championships were being played simultaneously in Columbia, South Carolina), Sanders played in the conference semifinal baseball game against Southern Mississippi, ran a leg of a 4 × 100 relay, then returned to play in the baseball championship game against Cincinnati. Though Sanders' relay team did not place in the event, the FSU track team was the overall conference champion, and the baseball team won the conference title as well.

== Professional baseball career ==
=== Drafts and minor leagues ===
Sanders had a nine-year, part-time baseball career, playing left and center field in 641 games with four teams. He was drafted by the Kansas City Royals in the sixth round of the 1985 draft, but did not sign with them. The New York Yankees selected Sanders in the 30th round of the 1988 Major League Baseball draft, and he signed with the team on June 22. He batted .284 in 28 minor league games after signing.

The Yankees invited Sanders to spring training in 1989. Assigned to wear no. 71 as a uniform number, Sanders requested a single digit number. The Yankees gave him no. 30, the lowest number available, which offended many veteran players on the team. Sanders opened the 1989 season with the Albany-Colonie Yankees of the Double–A Eastern League. Though Sanders planned to leave the Yankees in July to attend NFL training camp, he became embroiled in a contract dispute with the Falcons, and used the Yankees as leverage.

=== New York Yankees (1989–1990) ===
Sanders received a promotion to the major leagues, and spent the summer with the Columbus Clippers of the Triple–A International League. Sanders made his MLB debut on May 31, 1989.

During the 1989 season, Sanders hit a home run and scored a touchdown in the NFL in the same week, becoming the only player ever to do so. Sanders is also the only person to play in both a Super Bowl and a World Series. Sanders and Bo Jackson were the preeminent multi-sport athletes of their time, but prior to the 1990 season, they had never squared off against each other in a professional game. That changed in 1990, when Jackson and Sanders met five times on the diamond—the most memorable of which came on July 17, in what was billed as "The Bo and Prime Time Show". After Bo Jackson's three-homer night, Sanders said, "He's (Bo's) one of the best athletes who ever put on a uniform." Sanders himself hit a dramatic inside-the-park home run in the same game that was unsuccessfully fielded by Jackson.

Sanders made the Yankees' Opening Day roster for the 1990 season. On May 22, 1990, Sanders became involved in a dispute with Chicago White Sox catcher Carlton Fisk. Sanders started by stepping up to the plate with one out and a runner on third, drawing a dollar sign in the dirt before the pitch and then failed to run to first base after hitting a routine pop fly to shortstop, trotting back to the dugout instead. The Yankee fans booed, and Fisk told Sanders to run the ball out and called Sanders a "piece of shit". Later in the game, Sanders told Fisk that "the days of slavery are over". Fisk was furious, later saying: "He comes up and wants to make it a racial issue, there's no racial issue involved. There is a right way and a wrong way to play this game."

By mid-July, Sanders expressed that he was unsure if he would remain with the Yankees or report to training camp for the upcoming NFL season. He requested a $1 million salary for the 1991 season, and the Yankees ended negotiations on a contract extension with Sanders. He left the team, finishing the 1990 season with a .158 batting average and three home runs in 57 games. In September 1990, the Yankees placed Sanders on waivers with the intention of giving him his release, as Yankees' general manager Gene Michael said that Sanders' football career was stunting his baseball development.

=== Atlanta Braves (1991–1994) ===
Sanders later signed with the Atlanta Braves for the 1991 MLB season. However, he was assigned to the Triple-A Richmond Braves in early May after losing playing time to Otis Nixon before returning to Atlanta in late June. On July 31, Sanders hit a key three-run homer to spark a comeback win against the Pittsburgh Pirates during the Braves' run to the National League West Division title. However, he left the Braves the very next day to report to the Atlanta Falcons because of a clause in his NFL contract and missed the postseason. Before the 1992 season, Sanders reworked his NFL deal, whereby he still reported to the Falcons for training camp in August, but was allowed to rejoin the Braves for the postseason.

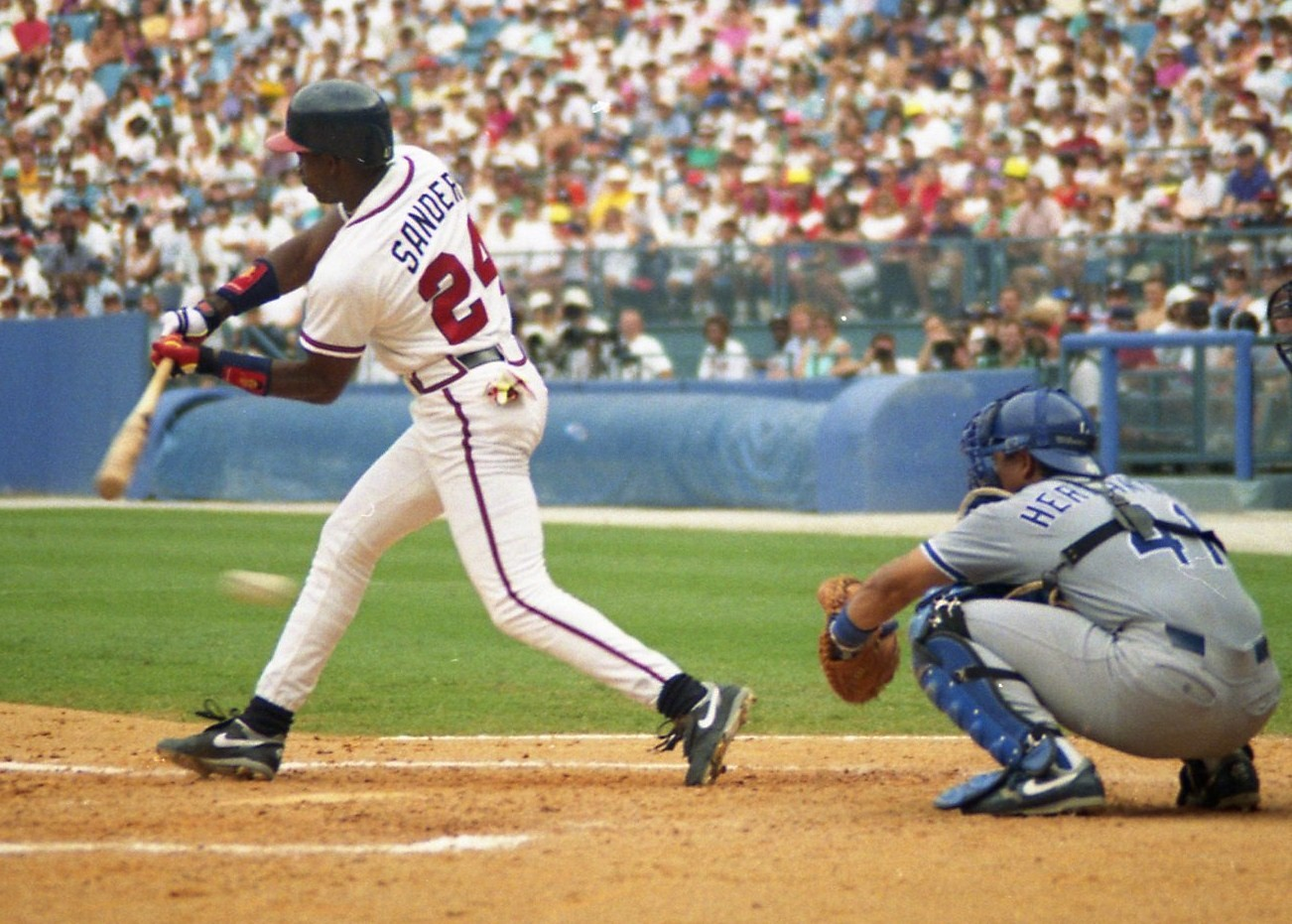
Sanders batting for the Atlanta Braves in 1993

During the 1992 season, his best year in the majors, Sanders hit .304 for the team, stole 26 bases, and led the NL with 14 triples in 97 games. In four games of the 1992 World Series, Sanders batted .533 with four runs, eight hits, two doubles, and one RBI while playing with a broken bone in his foot. His batting average, on-base percentage, slugging percentage, total bases and win probability added each led the team in the series. Despite Sanders' performance, the Braves ultimately lost to the Toronto Blue Jays in six games. In Game 3, he narrowly avoided being a victim of what would have been only the second triple play in World Series history (following Bill Wambsganss' unassisted triple play in 1920). With Sanders on second base and Terry Pendleton on first, David Justice hit a deep fly ball to center field that Blue Jays center fielder Devon White unexpectedly caught with a leaping effort. Pendleton passed Sanders on the bases for the second out, but umpire Bob Davidson called Sanders safe after he scampered back to second base. Replays showed that Toronto third baseman Kelly Gruber tagged him on the heel before he returned to second.

=== Cincinnati Reds (1994–1995) ===
The Braves traded Sanders to the Cincinnati Reds in exchange for Roberto Kelly on May 30, 1994. In 46 games played, Sanders batted .277 and stole 19 bases. The following year, he played in 33 games for the Reds, recording a .240 batting average with 16 stolen bases before being traded to the San Francisco Giants.

=== San Francisco Giants (1995) ===
On July 21, 1995, the Reds traded Sanders, David McCarty, Ricky Pickett, John Roper, and Scott Service to the San Francisco Giants for Dave Burba, Darren Lewis, and Mark Portugal. He batted .280, hit five home runs and stole eight bases in 52 games for the Giants.

=== Cincinnati Reds (1997, 2001) ===
In 1997, Sanders finished second in the National League with 56 stolen bases in 115 games while with the Cincinnati Reds before leaving baseball for three years.

Sanders returned to the Reds in 2001, but was released after playing in only 32 games and batting just .173. After Sanders' release from the Reds, he signed a minor league contract with the Toronto Blue Jays, who assigned him to the Triple-A Syracuse SkyChiefs.

Sanders' football contract had been negotiated to allow for him to play both baseball and football, but the terms of the contract stated that Sanders could miss NFL training camp and the first few games of the season only if he were playing Major League Baseball. Since he was not then on an MLB roster, Sanders had to leave Syracuse and return to the Washington Redskins so he would not violate his NFL contract. In his final professional baseball game, Sanders hit a solo home run and an RBI single in Syracuse's 12–6 win over the Toledo Mud Hens. As those in MLB and the NFL urged Sanders to concentrate on only one sport (similar to what they did with Bo Jackson), he often explained, "football is my wife and baseball is my mistress."

== Professional football career ==
=== Atlanta Falcons (1989–1993) ===
Pre-draft measurables
Height	Weight	40-yard dash	10-yard split	20-yard split
5 ft 11 3/4 in (1.82 m)	182 lb (83 kg)	4.27 s	1.53 s	2.56 s
All values from NFL Combine

At the 1989 NFL Scouting Combine, Sanders ran the 40-yard dash with times of 4.27s and 4.29s. He was selected in the first round with the fifth overall pick in the 1989 NFL draft by the Atlanta Falcons, where he played until 1993. Despite fumbling (and recovering) his first NFL punt return (which was re-kicked on a penalty), Sanders ran for a touchdown on his second return attempt of his first game, a 31–21 loss to the Los Angeles Rams.

In the 1990 season opener, he had an 82-yard pick six in the fourth quarter of the 47–27 win over the Houston Oilers. In Week 8, against the Cincinnati Bengals, he had a 79-yard punt return for a touchdown in the 38–17 win. In Week 17, he had a 61-yard pick six against the Dallas Cowboys in a 26–7 win.

He was named NFC Defensive Player of the Week twice in the 1991 season for Weeks 4 and 12. In Week 7, against the San Francisco 49ers, he had a 100-yard kickoff return for a touchdown in the 39–34 win. In Week 12, against the Tampa Bay Buccaneers, he had two interceptions for his first multi-pick game of his professional career. In Week 16, he had a 48-yard pick six, which was his second interception of the game, in a 26–13 win over the Seattle Seahawks in the final game at Atlanta–Fulton County Stadium.

In Week 2 of the 1992 season, he had a 99-yard kickoff return for a touchdown in the 24–17 loss to Washington. On October 11, Sanders played in a Falcons game in Miami and then flew to Pittsburgh, hoping to play in the Braves' National League Championship Series game against the Pirates that evening and become the first athlete to play in two professional leagues on the same day. Sanders, however, did not appear in the baseball game that night. In Week 12, against the Buffalo Bills, he had a 75-yard kickoff return for a touchdown in the 41–14 loss. In Week 13, he had two interceptions against the New England Patriots in a 34–0 win. In Week 15, he scored a 37-yard receiving touchdown in the 35–7 win over the Tampa Bay Buccaneers. In 1992, he led the league in kick return yards (1,067), yards per return (26.7), and return touchdowns (two).

In Week 11 of the 1993 season, Sanders had two interceptions in a 13–0 road win over the Los Angeles Rams. In Week 12, Sanders had a 70-yard reception for a touchdown against the Dallas Cowboys in the 27–14 victory. For November 1993, he was NFC Defensive Player of the Month. In Week 15, he had two interceptions in a 27–24 win over the San Francisco 49ers to earn NFC Defensive Player of the Week. He was a three-time Pro Bowler with the Falcons (1991–1993) and earned first team All-Pro honors twice (1992–1993). During his five years playing with the Falcons, Sanders scored ten touchdowns (three defensive, three kick returns, two punt returns, and two receptions). During his time in Atlanta, he intercepted 24 passes (including a career-high seven in 1993), three of which he returned for touchdowns.

=== San Francisco 49ers (1994) ===
After five seasons with Atlanta, Sanders signed on to play the 1994 season with the San Francisco 49ers. He had arguably his best season as a professional football player, recording six interceptions and returning them for an NFL-best 303 yards and three touchdowns, averaging 50.5 yards per return. (Average yards per interception return is not an official NFL statistic however.) It was also the most interception return yardage in a single-season since Charlie McNeil in 1961. In Week 4, against the New Orleans Saints, he had a 74-yard interception return for a touchdown in the fourth quarter of the 24–13 win. He was named NFC Defensive Player of the Week. Two of his interceptions were returned for a gain of at least 90 yards, making him the first player to do this in NFL history. On October 16, 1994, Sanders made his dramatic return to the Georgia Dome in a 49er uniform. After getting into a scuffle with his former Falcon teammate Andre Rison, Sanders intercepted a pass from quarterback Jeff George and returned it 93 yards while mockingly staring down the entire Falcons sideline before high-stepping into the end zone. In Week 15, a 38–15 win over the San Diego Chargers, he had a 90-yard pick six in the fourth quarter. Sanders was later voted the 1994 NFL Defensive Player of the Year. He finished tied for third in MVP voting. He earned Pro Bowl and first team All Pro honors for the 1994 season. In Super Bowl XXIX, he recorded an end zone interception in the fourth quarter as the 49ers won over the San Diego Chargers, earning him his first championship ring.

=== Dallas Cowboys (1995–1999) ===
Sanders, along with his agent Eugene Parker, courted several teams in need of a cornerback. The teams in the "Deion Sweepstakes", as it was called by the media, were the Philadelphia Eagles, Oakland Raiders, Miami Dolphins, New Orleans Saints, San Francisco 49ers and the Dallas Cowboys, who had lost their starting cornerback Kevin Smith to injury for the rest of the season.

On September 9, 1995, in Week 2, Sanders signed a lucrative contract with the Dallas Cowboys (seven years, $35 million with a $12.99 million signing bonus, because owner Jerry Jones was superstitious about the number 13), essentially making him at the time, the highest-paid defensive player in the NFL. Sanders later stated in his book Power, Money & Sex: How Success Almost Ruined My Life that the Oakland Raiders offered him more money than any other team, but he chose to play in Dallas for more time on the offensive side of the ball, a chance to win back-to-back Super Bowls, and because of his friendship with Cowboys wide receiver Michael Irvin. Arthroscopic surgery kept him sidelined until his debut in week 9, which was once again in Atlanta against the Falcons; the Cowboys won, 28–13. In the Divisional Round of the playoffs, he had a 21-yard rushing touchdown in the 30–11 win over the Philadelphia Eagles. He went on to help the Cowboys win their third title in four years in Super Bowl XXX against the Pittsburgh Steelers, where he returned a punt for 11 yards and caught a 47-yard reception on offense, setting up Dallas's first touchdown of the game and a 27–17 victory.

In Week 1 of the 1996 season, Sanders had a career-high nine receptions on 15 targets for 87 yards in a 22–6 on the road against the Chicago Bears. In Week 2, Sanders had a receiving touchdown in the 27–0 win over the New York Giants. In Week 3, he had a 22-yard fumble return for a touchdown in the 25–24 loss to the Indianapolis Colts.

In Week 5 of the 1997 season, he had an 83-yard punt return for a touchdown against the Chicago Bears. In Week 13, Sanders had a 50-yard pick six in the 45–17 loss to the Green Bay Packers.

In Week 3 of the 1998 season, Sanders had a 59-yard punt return for a touchdown and a 71-yard interception return for a touchdown against the New York Giants. In Week 9, he had a 69-yard punt return for a touchdown in the 34–0 win over the Philadelphia Eagles.

In Week 7 of the 1999 season, he had a 70-yard punt return for a touchdown in a 38–20 over Washington. In Week 12, he had two interceptions in a 20–0 win over the Miami Dolphins.

From 1996 to 1999, he earned Pro Bowl selections in each season. He was named first team All-Pro for the 1996–1998 seasons. On June 2, 2000, he was released in a salary cap move.

=== Washington Redskins (2000) ===
Soon after the Cowboys released Sanders, the Washington Redskins signed Sanders to a seven-year, $56 million contract. In Week 5 of the 2000 season, he recorded a 57-yard punt return to set Washington up for a game-winning field goal in overtime against the Tampa Bay Buccaneers. Sanders was named NFC Special Teams Player of the Week. Sanders finished the 2000 season with 41 tackles (38 solo), four interceptions, nine passes defended, and two fumble recoveries. At the end of the 2000 season and an above-average statistical year, Sanders abruptly retired in July 2001 after only playing one year with the Redskins.

On December 23, 2002, the Redskins waived Sanders from the reserve/retired list in order to potentially allow him to play for the Oakland Raiders in the 2002–03 NFL playoffs. If he had passed through waivers unclaimed, he would have been able to sign a free-agent contract with any team and play during the season. However, on December 25, five teams (the Indianapolis Colts, Kansas City Chiefs, Pittsburgh Steelers, San Diego Chargers and Tennessee Titans) placed waiver bids for him, with the Chargers claiming him by having the highest waiver priority. Since it was too late in the season to be activated from the reserve/retired list, he was unable to play for the Chargers for the rest of the season.

=== Baltimore Ravens (2004–2005) ===
In 2004, Sanders announced his intention to come out of retirement after being convinced by his friend Joe Zorovich, Baltimore Ravens cornerback Corey Fuller, and linebacker Ray Lewis to play. He signed a one-year deal with the Ravens to be a nickelback. Sanders chose to wear the number 37, which matched his age at the time, to preemptively let people know that he was well aware of his relative senior status as an NFL player (additionally, his usual number 21 was already being worn by Ravens Pro Bowl cornerback Chris McAlister). Against the Buffalo Bills in week 7 of 2004, Sanders scored his ninth career interception return touchdown, moving him into a tie with Ken Houston and Aeneas Williams, and behind Rod Woodson (with 12), for second place all-time in the statistical category. He was named AFC Defensive Player of the Week for his game against the Bills. He finished the 2004 season with three interceptions.

Sanders played in every game of the 2005 season. He had 30 tackles (27 solo), two interceptions, and five passes defended. The Ravens failed to qualify for the postseason for the second straight year and he retired in January 2006.

== Coaching career ==
=== High school ===
While continuing to work as an NFL analyst, Sanders became the head coach for the Prime Prep Academy, which he co-founded. The executive director of the school twice tried to fire Sanders, in one instance after witnesses said Sanders grabbed a school official by the collar, causing the official to fall to the floor. He stayed as the head coach for 2012 and 2013. The school was shut down in 2015 amid a spate of problems.

In 2015, he was hired as the head coach for Triple A Academy, where he was the coach for two seasons.

In 2017, he became the offensive coordinator for Trinity Christian High School giving him the opportunity to coach his sons Shilo and Shedeur Sanders, along with his eldest son Deion Jr.

=== Jackson State ===
==== 2020 season ====
On September 21, 2020, Deion Sanders became the 21st head coach of the Jackson State Tigers of the historically black (HBCU) Jackson State University. The Tigers play in the second level of NCAA football, the Division I Football Championship Subdivision (FCS). In his first season in spring 2021, abbreviated and delayed from its normally intended fall 2020 schedule due to COVID-19 disruptions, he led the Tigers to a 4–3 record, with one win by forfeit.

==== 2021 season ====
In the fall 2021 season, Sanders led the Tigers to the Southwestern Athletic Conference (SWAC) title and a program record of 11 wins, also being named the recipient of the fall 2021 Eddie Robinson Award as the season's top FCS head coach. Jackson State went on to play in the 2021 Celebration Bowl where they were defeated by South Carolina State 31–10. The following season, Jackson State again played in the Celebration Bowl where they were again defeated 41–34 by North Carolina Central, bringing Coach Sanders' overall bowl record to 0–2.

==== 2022 season ====
Sanders notably flipped the recruitment of defensive back Travis Hunter who was the number one overall recruit in the 2022 class. Hunter initially committed to Sanders' alma mater Florida State. The move was heralded by recruiting director Steve Wiltfong; he said it was "the biggest signing day moment in the history of college football" as Football Championship Subdivision programs and the HBCUs that compete at such a level of competition are not usual destinations for high level recruits out of high school. Hunter was the first five-star recruit to sign with an FCS program. Not only did Sanders attract high-level recruits for HBCUs, he increased revenue for these once low funded teams and put HBCUs on the map. Sanders donated half of his salary to help complete the football facility at Jackson State.

=== Colorado ===
==== 2023 season ====
On December 3, 2022, Sanders was named the head coach of the Colorado Buffaloes. Sanders made extensive use of the transfer portal in replacing nearly the entire Buffaloes' roster, with 46 players leaving in the transfer portal and 50 transferring in. Nine followed him from Jackson State, including sons Shedeur and Shilo, and former five-star recruit Travis Hunter. After going 1–11 in the previous season, Colorado won their first three games of the 2023 season, then lost their next two, then recorded their only conference win of the season in a 27–24 result over Arizona State. Colorado finished the season 4–8 with a 1–8 record in Pac-12 play.

==== 2024 season ====
Colorado entered the 2024 season with a projected win total of 5.5 wins. They ultimately finished the regular season 9–3, tied for first in the Big 12 conference, but missing the conference championship game due to tiebreakers. Cornerback and wide receiver Travis Hunter won the Heisman trophy for Colorado, with quarterback Shedeur Sanders finishing eighth in Heisman voting. The team lost to BYU by a score of 36–14 in the Alamo Bowl. Colorado finished the season ranked 25th in the AP Poll. The Buffaloes finished ranked for the first time since the 2016 season. Following the strong season, Colorado retired the jerseys of Travis Hunter and Shedeur Sanders.

==== 2025 season ====
On March 28, 2025, Sanders agreed to a five-year, $54 million contract extension with Colorado. On October 11, the Buffaloes had a ranked-win over #22 Iowa State by a score of 24–17. The Buffaloes finished the 2025 season with a 3–9 record, and were not bowl-eligible.

== Career statistics ==
Legend
	NFL Defensive Player of the Year
	Won the Super Bowl
**Bold**	Career high

=== NFL ===
==== Defensive/special team statistics ====
Year	Team	Games		Tackles				Interceptions						Fumbles				Punt returns					Kickoff returns				
Year	Team	GP	GS	Comb	Solo	Ast	Sck	PD	Int	Yds	Avg	Lng	TD	FF	FR	Yds	TD	Ret	Yds	Avg	Lng	TD	Ret	Yds	Avg	Lng	TD
1989	ATL	15	10	39	—	—	0.0	—	5	52	10.4	22	0	**2**	1	0	0	28	307	11.0	68T	1	35	725	20.7	72	0
1990	ATL	16	16	50	—	—	0.0	—	3	153	**51.0**	82T	2	0	2	0	0	29	250	8.6	79T	1	39	851	21.8	50	0
1991	ATL	15	15	49	—	—	**1.0**	—	6	119	19.8	55T	1	**2**	1	0	0	21	170	8.1	23	0	26	576	22.2	**100**	1
1992	ATL	13	12	**66**	—	—	0.0	—	3	105	35.0	55	0	**2**	2	0	0	13	41	3.2	14	0	**40**	**1,067**	**26.7**	99	**2**
1993	ATL	11	10	34	—	—	0.0	—	**7**	91	13.0	41	0	1	0	0	0	2	21	10.5	16	0	7	169	24.1	31	0
1994	SF	14	12	36	34	2	0.0	—	6	**303**	50.5	**93T**	**3**	0	1	0	0	—	—	—	—	—	—	—	—	—	—
1995	DAL	9	9	26	25	1	0.0	—	2	34	17.0	34	0	—	—	—	—	1	54	**54.0**	54	0	1	15	15.0	15	0
1996	DAL	16	15	33	31	2	0.0	—	2	3	1.5	2	0	1	**3**	**15**	**1**	1	4	4.0	4	0	—	—	—	—	—
1997	DAL	13	12	33	30	**3**	0.0	—	2	81	40.5	50T	1	—	—	—	—	**33**	**407**	12.3	**83**	1	1	18	18.0	18	0
1998	DAL	11	11	25	22	**3**	0.0	—	5	153	30.6	71T	1	0	1	0	0	24	375	15.6	69	**2**	1	16	16.0	16	0
1999	DAL	14	14	42	**40**	2	0.0	6	3	2	0.7	2	0	1	0	0	0	30	344	11.5	76	1	4	87	21.8	31	0
2000	WAS	16	15	41	38	**3**	0.0	**9**	4	91	22.8	32	0	1	2	0	0	25	185	7.4	57	0	1	−1	−1.0	−1	0
2004	BAL	9	2	8	7	1	0.0	5	3	87	29.0	48T	1	—	—	—	—	5	41	8.2	23	0	—	—	—	—	—
2005	BAL	16	4	30	27	**3**	0.0	5	2	57	28.5	33	0	—	—	—	—	—	—	—	—	—	—	—	—	—	—
Career		188	157	512	254	20	1.0	25	53	1,331	25.1	93	9	10	13	15	1	212	2,199	10.4	83	6	155	3,523	22.7	100	3

==== Offensive statistics ====
Year	Team	Games		Receiving					Rushing					Fumbles	
Year	Team	GP	GS	Rec	Yds	Avg	Lng	TD	Att	Yds	Avg	Lng	TD	Fum	Lost
1989	ATL	15	10	1	−8	−8.0	−8	0	—	—	—	—	—	0	0
1990	ATL	16	16	—	—	—	—	—	—	—	—	—	—	0	0
1991	ATL	15	15	1	17	17.0	17	0	—	—	—	—	—	1	0
1992	ATL	13	12	3	45	15.0	37	**1**	1	−4	−4.0	−4	0	**3**	**2**
1993	ATL	11	10	6	106	**17.7**	**70**	**1**	—	—	—	—	—	0	0
1994	SF	14	12	—	—	—	—	—	—	—	—	—	—	0	0
1995	DAL	9	9	2	25	12.5	19	0	2	**9**	**4.5**	**8**	0	0	0
1996	DAL	16	15	**36**	**475**	13.2	41	**1**	**3**	2	0.7	3	**1**	2	**2**
1997	DAL	13	12	—	—	—	—	—	1	−11	−11.0	−11	0	1	0
1998	DAL	11	11	7	100	14.3	55	0	—	—	—	—	—	1	0
1999	DAL	14	14	4	24	6.0	9	0	—	—	—	—	—	1	0
2000	WAS	16	15	—	—	—	—	—	—	—	—	—	—	**3**	1
2004	BAL	9	2	—	—	—	—	—	1	−10	−10.0	−10	0	0	0
2005	BAL	16	4	—	—	—	—	—	1	0	0.0	0	0	1	0
Career		188	157	60	784	13.1	70	3	9	−14	−1.6	8	1	13	5

=== College ===
Year	School	Games		Tackles			Interceptions			
Year	School	G	GS	Solo	Ast	Tot	Int	PD	FF	FR
1985	Florida State	11	4	22	20	42	1	4	0	0
1986	Florida State	12	11	**34**	**27**	**61**	4	8	**2**	0
1987	Florida State	12	12	29	16	46	4	**9**	1	0
1988	Florida State	10	10	25	12	37	**5**	6	1	0

== Head coaching record ==
=== College ===
Year	Team	Overall	Conference	Standing	Bowl/playoffs	STATS/AP^{#}	Coaches^{°}
Jackson State Tigers (Southwestern Athletic Conference) (2020–2022)
2020–21	Jackson State	4–3	3–2	T–2nd (East)			
2021	Jackson State	11–2 (Note: Sanders missed three conference games during the 2021 season while recovering from foot surgery, all of which Jackson State won. Gary Harrell acted as interim head coach in his absence. Jackson State credits the entire season to Sanders.)	8–0	1st (East)	L Celebration	22	19
2022	Jackson State	12–1	8–0	1st (East)	L Celebration	16	11
Jackson State:		27–6	19–2				
Colorado Buffaloes (Pac-12 Conference) (2023)
2023	Colorado	4–8	1–8	12th			
Colorado Buffaloes (Big 12 Conference) (2024–present)
2024	Colorado	9–4	7–2	T–1st	L Alamo	25	25
2025	Colorado	3–9	1–8	15th			
2026	Colorado	4–7	2–6				
Colorado:		20–28	11–24				
Total:		47–34					
National championship Conference title Conference division title or championship game berth

=== High school ===
Year	Team	Overall	Conference	Standing	Bowl/playoffs
Prime Prep Cardinals () (2012–2013)
2012	Prime Prep	1–5	1–3	3rd	
2013	Prime Prep	7–2	1–0	1st	
Prime Prep:		8–7	2–3		
Triple A Academy Stallions () (2015–2016)
2015	Triple A Academy	4–8	1–1	3rd	
2016	Triple A Academy	5–6	5–1	2nd	
Triple A Academy:		9–14	6–2		
Total:		17–21			
National championship Conference title Conference division title or championship game berth

== Coaching tree ==
Four of Sanders' former coaching assistants have gone on to head coaching jobs:

- T. C. Taylor, Jackson State (2023-Present)
- Sean Lewis, San Diego State (2024-Present)
- Charles Kelly, Jacksonville State (2025-Present)
- Marshall Faulk, Southern (2026-Present)

== Legacy and honors ==
During his 14-year NFL career, Sanders was a perennial All-Pro and considered by many as one of, if not the strongest pass defenders ever to play the game.

Sanders also occasionally lined up with the team's offense. During the 1996 season, Sanders skipped the baseball season, concentrating on football, and attended the first NFL training camp of his career to better familiarize himself with the nuances of the wide receiver position. He became only the second two-way starter (after the Cardinals' Roy Green) in the NFL since Chuck Bednarik.

Sanders is the only man to play in both a Super Bowl and a World Series, to hit an MLB home run and score an NFL touchdown in the same week, and to have both a reception and an interception in the Super Bowl. He is one of seven players to win back-to-back Super Bowls with different teams. He is (along with fellow two-way player and Pro Football Hall of Famer "Bullet" Bill Dudley) also one of two players to score an NFL touchdown six different ways (interception return, punt return, kickoff return, receiving, rushing, and fumble recovery).

During his career, Sanders intercepted 53 passes for 1,331 yards (a 25.1 yards per return average), recovered four fumbles for 15 yards, returned 155 kickoffs for 3,523 yards, gained 2,199 yards on 212 punt returns, and caught 60 passes for 784 yards. Sanders amassed 7,838 all-purpose yards and scored 22 touchdowns, nine interception returns, six punt returns, three kick returns, three receiving, and one fumble recovery. His 19 defensive and return touchdowns was an NFL record (now held by Devin Hester with 20 return touchdowns). In the postseason Sanders added five more interceptions, as well as three receptions for 95 yards, four carries for 39 yards, and two touchdowns (one rushing and one receiving). He was selected to eight Pro Bowls and won the NFL Defensive Player of the Year Award in 1994. He is #1 all-time in NFL interception-return-average for players with at least 35 interceptions.

- College Football News named Sanders No. 8 in its list of 100 Greatest College Football Players of All-Time.
- The Sporting News named Sanders No. 37 in their Top 100 Football Players of the Century released in 1999.
- ESPN named Sanders No. 74 in its list of the 100 Great Athletes of the Century released in 1999.
- NFL.com named Sanders No. 34 on NFL's Top 100 list released in late 2010
- NFL Network named "Deion Sanders and anyone" in their Top 10 greatest cornerback tandems in NFL history: "...Deion Sanders started opposite 13 other cornerbacks, and no matter who started on the other side the defense was better with No. 21 baiting QBs."
- On November 11, 2010, Sanders was inducted into the Atlanta Falcons' Ring of Honor.
- On May 17, 2011, Sanders was announced as a College Football Hall of Fame inductee.
- On August 6, 2011, Sanders was inducted into the Pro Football Hall of Fame in his first year of eligibility.
- In August 2025, Sanders was named to the AP All-Time All-America college football team

On February 6, 2011, at Super Bowl XLV in Arlington, Texas, Sanders performed the pregame coin toss.

Sanders did not attend classes or take final exams during the fall semester (1988) of his senior year at Florida State, yet played in the Sugar Bowl against Auburn. This caused the state legislature to create the "Deion Sanders rule", whereby a football athlete at any state university could not play in a bowl game if he failed to successfully complete the previous semester.

In 1995, he signed with the Dallas Cowboys for a minimum yearly base salary and a nearly $13 million signing bonus in an attempt to circumvent the NFL's salary cap. This caused the NFL to institute its own "Deion Sanders rule", whereby a prorated portion of a player's signing bonus counted against the salary cap.

Sanders was named to the Pro Football Hall of Fame's 1st Team All-1990s Team.

Sanders was named to the NFL 100 All Time Team.

== Media appearances and pop culture fame ==
Sanders became known for sporting a "do-rag" or bandana and for high-stepping into the end zone followed by his touchdown dance celebrations. At the end of his Hall of Fame speech, he put a bandana on his bust.

His "Prime Time" nickname was given to him by a friend and high-school teammate, Florida Gators defensive back Richard Fain. The two played pickup basketball games together during the prime time television hour, and Sanders' athletic display during those games earned him the nickname.

Sanders, wearing custom-made showy suits and flashy jewelry, capitalized on his image. On December 26, 1994, Sanders released Prime Time, a rap album on MC Hammer's Bust It Records that featured the singles "Must Be the Money" and "Prime Time Keeps on Tickin'". The album and singles didn't chart in the Top 40. Following his first Super Bowl victory with the San Francisco 49ers, Sanders hosted Saturday Night Live, broadcast on February 18, 1995. Sanders performed a medley of songs from Prime Time, including "Must Be the Money" and "Heidi Heidi Hey".

As Hammer's friend, Sanders appeared in the "2 Legit 2 Quit" music video, and his alter-ego "Prime Time" showed up in Hammer's "Pumps and a Bump" music video. Hammer, being a big sports fan, launched a new enterprise called Roll Wit It Entertainment & Sports Management which boasted such clients as Evander Holyfield, Deion Sanders and Reggie Brooks. In 1995, Hammer released "Straight to My Feet" with Sanders, from the Street Fighter soundtrack (released in December 1994). The song charted No. 57 in the UK.

In January 1995, Sanders became the spokesman for the Sega Sports line of video games. Sanders has also appeared in television commercials for such companies as Nike, Pepsi, Burger King, Pizza Hut and American Express. These included a Road Runner Pepsi ad, with Sanders as the Road Runner with Wile E. Coyote targeting him, and a Pizza Hut commercial in which he appeared with Dallas Cowboys owner Jerry Jones. He also makes a cameo as himself in the film Celtic Pride.

After retiring from the NFL in 2001, Sanders worked as a pregame commentator for CBS' The NFL Today until 2004, when contract negotiations failed. Sanders turned down a 30% salary increase demanding to be paid $2.5 million, the highest of any NFL TV analyst. He was replaced by Shannon Sharpe. During Sanders' run, he participated in several sketches. The first was "Primetime and 21st", a mock street corner where Sanders (not yet a regular panelist) would give his opinions. Another one was his "Sanders Claus" persona, one of numerous sketches that involved young kids in football jerseys, representing NFL players, receiving a sarcastic gift from Sanders. Sanders actually debuted as "Sanders Claus" in a set of Nike commercials.

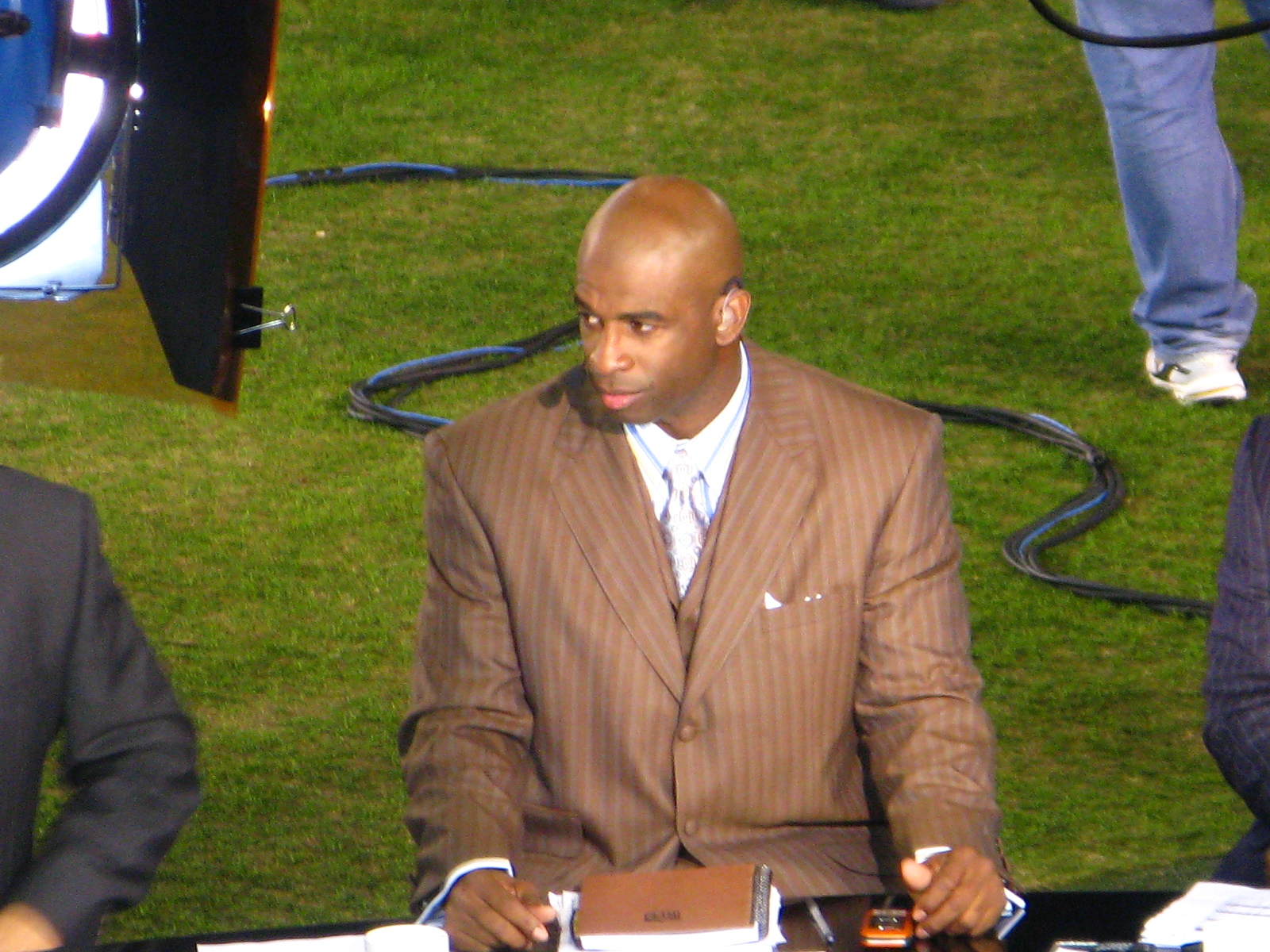
Sanders working as an analyst for NFL Network, 2008

Sanders frequently made guest appearances on ESPN, especially on the ESPN Radio Dallas affiliate, and briefly hosted a show called The New American Sportsman. He also hosted the 2002 Miss USA pageant.

Sanders co-hosted the 2004 GMA Dove Awards broadcast, taped in late April 2004, and slated for air on UPN in May 2004. When negotiations with fellow Viacom property The NFL Today failed two weeks before the broadcast, and he signed a deal with ESPN, UPN promptly canceled the broadcast, and the show aired on the i Network in December 2004 (both UPN and CBS are owned by CBS Corporation).

Sanders worked at NFL Network as an analyst on a number of the network's shows. Prior to the Sunday night game, Sanders, alongside host Rich Eisen and Steve Mariucci, broke down all the action from the afternoon games on NFL GameDay. At the conclusion of all the action on Sunday, Sanders, Mariucci, Michael Irvin and host Fran Charles recapped the day's action with highlights, analysis and postgame interviews. For the 2010 season, Sanders joined Eisen, Mariucci and Marshall Faulk on the road for Thursday Night Kickoff presented by Lexus, NFL Network's two-hour pregame show leading into Thursday Night Football. The group broadcast live from the stadium two hours prior to all eight live Thursday Night Football games and returned for the Sprint halftime show and Kay Jewelers postgame show. Sanders also had a segment called "Let's Go Primetime" on NFL Network.

In 2008, Sanders and his wife starred in the reality show Deion & Pilar: Prime Time Love, centering on them and their five children living in the small town of Prosper, Texas. That same year, he appeared with his family on Celebrity Family Feud in the July 22, 2008, episode, competing against Caitlyn and Kris Jenner, Kim, Kourtney and Khloé Kardashian.

Sanders appeared as himself in the fourth season of The League, playing a prospective buyer of Andre's apartment.

In 2014, Sanders was featured in an episode of Running Wild with Bear Grylls, where he and Grylls hiked in the desert of southern Utah for two days, rappelling down canyon walls and later climbing up a mesa.

Sanders served as an alumnus captain for Team Sanders in the 2014 Pro Bowl. He also re-joined CBS Sports as a studio analyst for Thursday games only.

In 2015, he competed against singer Justin Bieber in an episode of Spike's Lip Sync Battle and won with performances of "Play That Funky Music" by Wild Cherry and "Like a Virgin" by Madonna.

Sanders and his girlfriend Tracey Edmonds were featured together on an episode of Tiny House Nation that first aired on January 21, 2017.

In 2018, Sanders appeared in disguise on Undercover Boss; he met with youth coaches and the less fortunate; it aired on CBS.

Sanders is featured in the docuseries Coach Prime, which follows his career as a college football head coach.

Sanders appeared on Hell's Kitchen when he and several Stand Together contributors had their dinner cooked by the Blue Team during charity night.

=== Leon Sandcastle ===
Leon Sandcastle is a fictional character, depicted as a disguise for Sanders. The Sandcastle character was created for an NFL Network commercial. Sandcastle first appeared in a Super Bowl commercial in 2013. The commercial depicted Sanders suggesting he could still play at a level higher than the rookies in the 2013 NFL draft and deciding to make a comeback. He dons an afro, assumes the impromptu alias "Leon Sandcastle" and enters the draft, going through the full NFL Scouting Combine. For action shots, Ball State cornerback Andre Dawson served as the stunt double. The commercial features Sandcastle being drafted 1st overall in the draft by the Kansas City Chiefs. A voiceover then instructs viewers to watch NFL Network for offseason and draft coverage at the end noting in a deadpan voice that "the next rookie sensation probably won't be Leon Sandcastle."

Despite not being an actual prospect for the 2013 NFL draft, several combine videos have been created. The most prominent of these videos is Sandcastle's "4.2 40 yard dash". The NFL also created a "Combine Profile" for Sandcastle, as they do with actual prospects. In Rich Eisen's 2013 annual 'Run Rich Run' event, Sandcastle appeared giving tips to Eisen. Sandcastle's combine profile reveals that Sandcastle attended Primetime University. The commercial had a positive social media response as "Leon Sandcastle" was trending on Twitter worldwide, shortly after the commercial's airing. Sandcastle was also put into Madden NFL 13 as a card in the 'Ultimate Team' game mode. For April Fools' Day, 2013, NFL.com reported that Sandcastle would be the Chiefs' first overall selection.

The character developed marketing value and continued to appear in headlines, such as a fake endorsement deal with Under Armour and continued to make other appearance at NFL events. Sandcastle also had football trading cards produced and inserted into products by Topps and Panini America.

== Other business and entertainment ventures ==
In addition to his sports career, Sanders also had a career in music as a rapper. He released his debut album in 1994, Prime Time, through Hammer's Bust It Records label via Capitol Records. In 1995, Hammer released "Straight to My Feet" with Sanders, from the Street Fighter soundtrack (released in December 1994). The song charted No. 57 in the UK.

Sanders moved on to other ventures after his retirement. In 2003, Sanders took interest in Devin Hester, a return specialist from Miami. Sanders mentored Hester; he counselled and advised him during his collegiate career. The Chicago Bears drafted Hester in the second round of the 2006 NFL draft. Since then, Hester has broken the record for the most total returns for touchdowns in NFL history with 14 punt returns, 5 kick returns, and 1 missed field goal return (20). Hester has cited Sanders as one of his major inspirations and idols, and thanked him for his training and advice. Hester, also known as "Anytime", on occasion performed Sanders' signature touchdown dance and high-steps in homage to his mentor.

Sanders also tried to adopt a high school running back, Noel Devine, who was one of the top recruits in 2007. Sanders was advised against doing this but responded, "He doesn't have parents; they died. God put this young man in my heart. This is not about sports. This is about a kid's life." He now mentors Devine, and was a factor in Devine's extended wait to sign a letter-of-intent to West Virginia University. Devine eventually signed to play football for the Mountaineers.

Sanders has also been a mentor to Baltimore Ravens wide receiver Michael Crabtree, as well as former Dallas Cowboys wide receiver, Dez Bryant.

In January 2004, Sanders was hired as an assistant coach to the Dallas Fury, a women's professional basketball team in the National Women's Basketball League, even though Sanders had never played organized basketball either in college or the professional level.

On September 2, 2005, in response to Hurricane Katrina, Sanders challenged all professional athletes in the four major sports to donate $1,000 each to relief efforts, hoping to raise between $1.5 and $3 million. Sanders said "Through unity, we can touch thousands... I have friends and relatives that feel this pain. Help in any way you can." In April 2006, Sanders became an owner of the Austin Wranglers, an Arena Football League team.

Sanders has occasionally served as a celebrity spokesperson, such as representing Monitronics, a security system firm, at an industry conference in the spring of 2010.

In 2020, Sanders became an OOFOS brand ambassador. Sanders credited his OOFOS shoes with helping with the lingering pain he felt from his years as a professional athlete.

On April 10, 2024, Sanders entered into an endorsement deal with Boost Mobile.

== Discography ==
Year	Album	Chart positions	
Year	Album	US Hip-Hop	US Heatseekers
1994	Prime Time	70	14
2005	The Encore Remix	—	—
"—" denotes the album failed to chart or not released

== Personal life ==
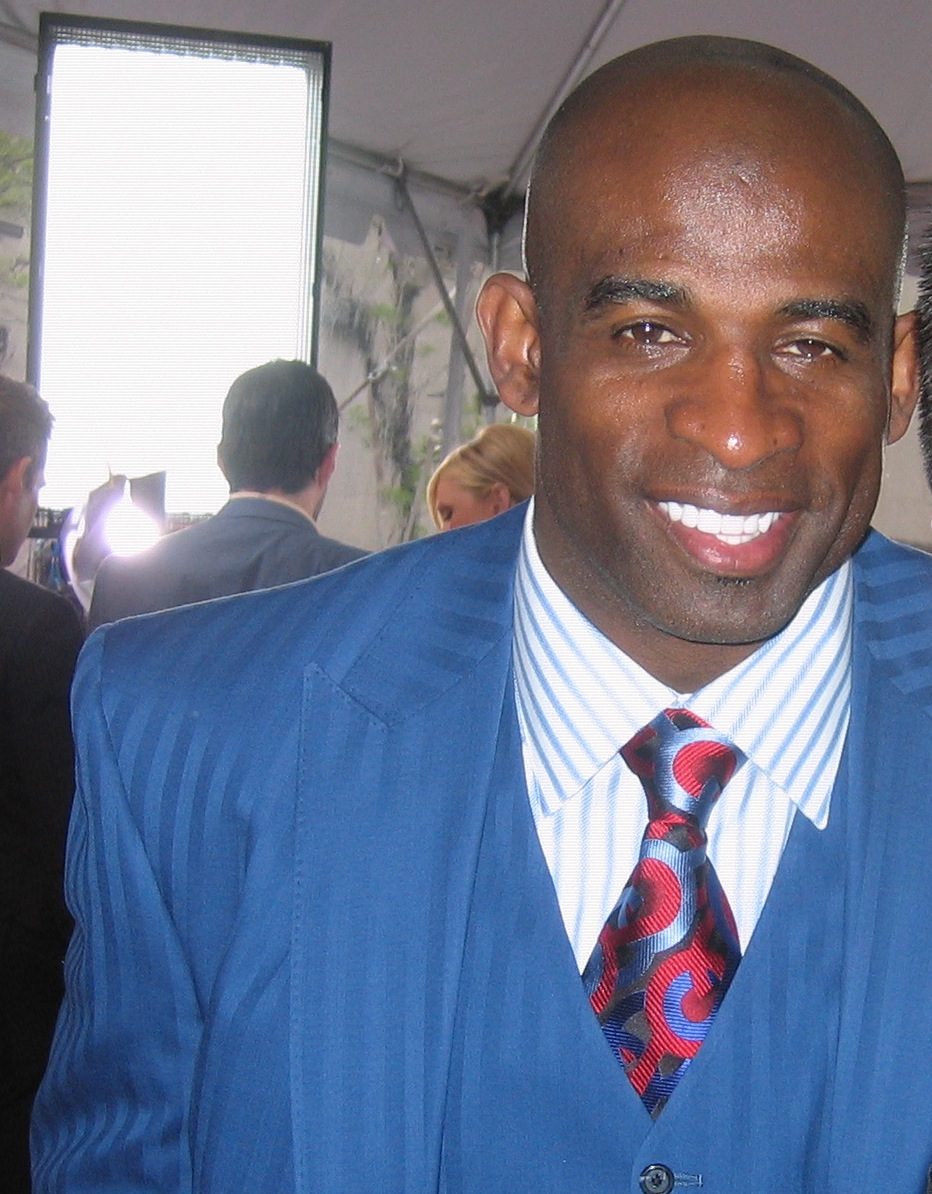
Sanders in 2008

Sanders has been married twice: He was married to Carolyn Chambers (1989–1998), with whom he had two children, Deiondra Sanders and Deion Sanders Jr. His second marriage was with Pilar Biggers-Sanders (1999–2015), with whom he has three children, Shilo, Shedeur, and Shelomi Sanders. Sanders coached his sons Shilo and Shedeur during their college careers.

In 1997, Sanders was going through a dark time in his life when his first marriage was ending and said he attempted suicide by driving a car off a cliff in Cincinnati while playing for the Reds. He has said he was driving as fast as 70 mph when he drove his car off a 30-to-40-foot (about 9-to-12-meter) cliff but that "there wasn't a scratch on me or on the car."

Sanders, a Christian, said, "I finally just got on my knees and gave it all to the Lord." He has also said that power, money, sex, and his success almost ruined his life; later writing an autobiography entitled just that: "Power, Money & Sex."

The book was inspired after he began counseling with Bishop T. D. Jakes. He names his agent, Eugene Parker, as another person who has influenced his life.

In April 2012, a dispute between Sanders and his estranged wife, Pilar Sanders, led to Pilar and Deion both facing misdemeanor assault charges, but a judge later ruled that neither party had committed family violence in that instance. The former couple had a bitter custody dispute in 2013 over their three children, and a Texas jury voted to give Deion Sanders sole custody of their two sons and joint custody over their daughter. Pilar criticized the decision, saying that the judge had not allowed testimony about the 2012 dispute.

In 2012, Sanders co-founded the charter school Prime Prep Academy. Sanders was later fired as the coach after CFO Kevin Johnson alleged Sanders assaulted him. Sanders publicly denied the claim, but witnesses said he had grabbed the school official by the collar, causing him to fall. Sanders pleaded no contest to a misdemeanor charge and paid a $765.70 fine. Prime Prep Academy was criticized for a lack of focus on academics and poor management, and it shut down in 2015. The school had amassed debt, owing payments to the IRS and a teachers' retirement fund, and, when it shut down, it did not have enough money to meet payroll.

In 2015, Sanders was named the CEO of FOCUS Academies and granted the head coaching position at Triple A Academy, which Sanders led to face his alma mater North Fort Myers High School in Florida, a game featuring a key matchup between several ranked recruits. On August 17, 2017, it was announced by CBS Sports that Sanders would be switching coaching positions at a new high school to become the offensive coordinator at Trinity Christian-Cedar Hill high school in Cedar Hill, Texas. The move was significant for Sanders, as both his sons played at the high school. Sanders served on the staff as offensive coordinator under former Dallas Cowboy Aveion Cason.

In 2020, Sanders graduated from Talladega College with a bachelor's degree in business administration with an emphasis on organizational management.

In 2021, Sanders underwent several foot surgeries and had two toes on his left foot amputated as a result of blood clots.

On July 28, 2025, Sanders announced that he had bladder cancer and had his bladder removed. He was considered cancer-free following the procedure.

== See also ==
- List of Major League Baseball annual triples leaders
- List of athletes who came out of retirement
- List of athletes who played in Major League Baseball and the National Football League
- List of multi-sport athletes
