= Coalition Against Insurance Fraud =

The Coalition Against Insurance Fraud is a coalition of insurance organizations, consumers, government agencies and legislative bodies in the United States working to enact anti-fraud legislation, educate the public, and provide anti-fraud advice. They are also a resource where consumers can find scam warnings, learn where to report fraud, and how to protect themselves.

The Coalition was founded in 1993 after several organizations reported a heavy rise in insurance fraud and a need to stop it.

== History ==
The Coalition was founded in 1993 by seventeen organizations that represented government, business and consumer interests, with the goal of reducing the prevalence and cost of insurance fraud. It has since grown to include more than 250 organizations as members.

== Mission ==
The Coalition's main mission is to fight insurance fraud, through activities that include government affairs, public education, events and research. The Coalitions seeks to unite and empower private and public groups against fraud, control insurance costs, protect public safety, and reduce crime.

== Activities ==
The Coalition has published research studies on subjects related to insurance fraud, including claims investigation, the economic consequences of insurance fraud, and fraud prevention.

The Coalition also publishes information on common forms of fraud, and how businesses and consumers can protect themselves.

The Coalition publishes a weekly alert for its members on insurance fraud issues, and the Journal of Insurance Fraud in America.
