= 2022 HBCU Legacy Bowl =

American college football all-star game

- 1st HBCU Legacy Bowl
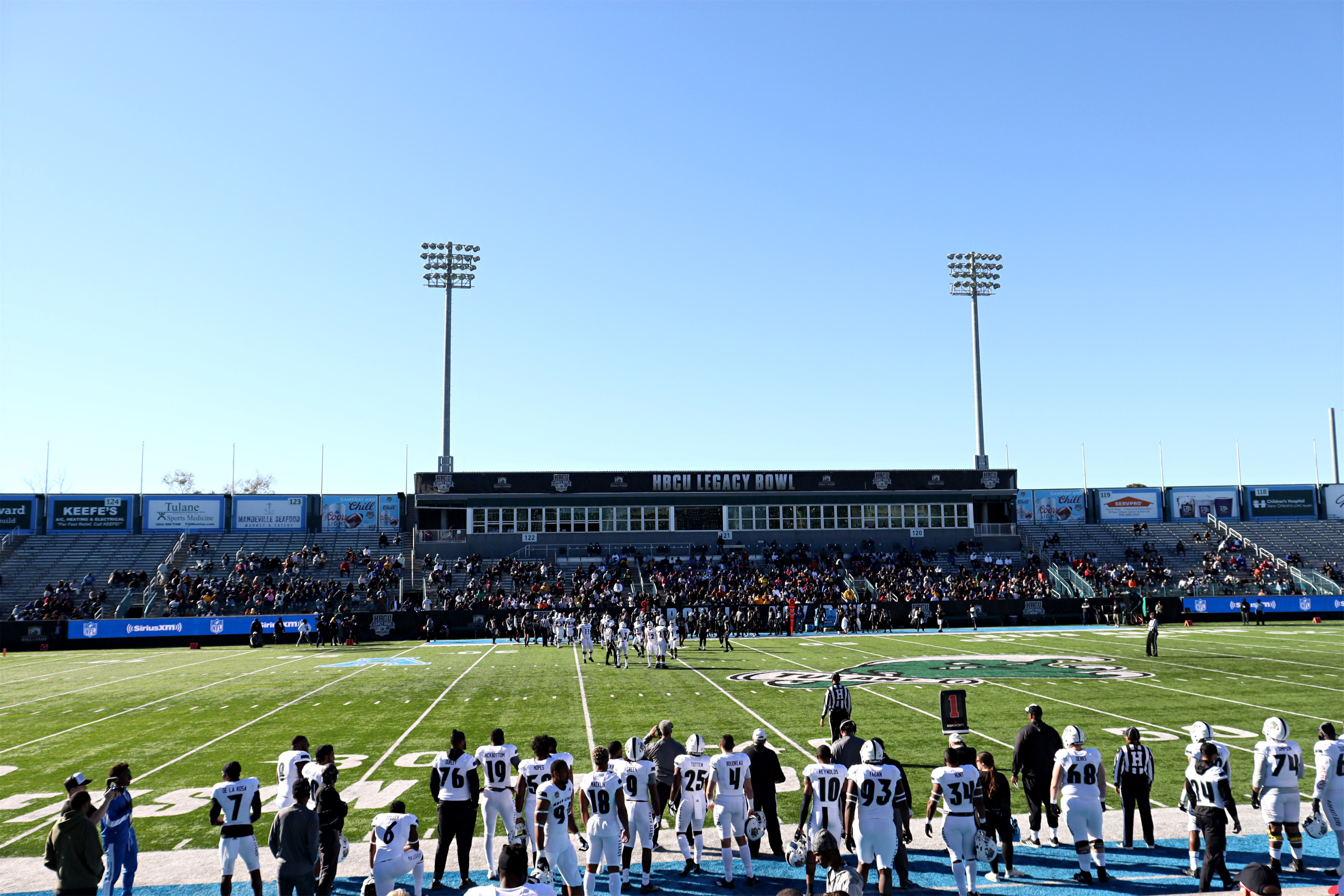
Team Robinson	Team Gaither
6	22
Head coach: Willie Simmons (Florida A&M)	Head coach: Buddy Pough (South Carolina State)
	1	2	3	4	Total
Team Robinson	0	0	6	0	6
Team Gaither	0	6	9	7	22
- Date: February 19, 2022
- Season: 2021
- Stadium: Yulman Stadium
- Location: New Orleans, Louisiana
- MVP: Geremy Hickbottom (QB, Tennessee State) & Antwan Collier (DB, Florida A&M)
- National anthem: Tonya Boyd-Cannon
- Referee: Tuta Salaam
- Halftime show: GSU Tiger Marching Band

United States TV coverage
- Network: NFL Network

The 2022 HBCU Legacy Bowl was a post-season college football all-star game played on February 19, 2022, at Yulman Stadium in New Orleans, Louisiana. It was the inaugural edition of the HBCU Legacy Bowl, whose founding was announced by the Black College Football Hall of Fame on March 18, 2021. The game was the last of the all-star games that concluded the 2021–22 bowl games. Television coverage was provided by NFL Network.

The bowl's teams are named after Jake Gaither, coach of the Florida A&M Rattlers from 1945 to 1973, and Eddie Robinson, coach of the Grambling State Tigers from 1941 to 1997.

== Players ==
Football programs representing historically black colleges and universities (HBCU) primarily compete in the Mid-Eastern Athletic Conference (MEAC) and Southwestern Athletic Conference (SWAC) in the NCAA Division I Football Championship Subdivision (FCS), the Central Intercollegiate Athletic Association (CIAA) and Southern Intercollegiate Athletic Conference (SIAC) in NCAA Division II, and the Gulf Coast Athletic Conference (GCAC) of the National Association of Intercollegiate Athletics (NAIA).

On September 1, 2021, Aqeel Glass, quarterback for the Alabama A&M Bulldogs, became the first player to be selected for the HBCU Legacy Bowl. As the 2021 season progressed, the game's website was updated with players who confirmed plans to participate in the game. Those players are listed below.

Team Gaither
Position	Player	School	Conf.
DL	Rafiq Abdul-Wahid	Chowan	CIAA
DB	Will Adams	Virginia State	CIAA
WR	Korey Banks	North Carolina A&T	Big South
P	Neil Boudreau	Morgan State	MEAC
LB	Wesley Bowers	Bowie State	CIAA
OL	Greg Brooks	Fayetteville State	CIAA
QB	Juwan Carter	Norfolk State	MEAC
OL	Louis Chandler	Langston University	SAC
LS	John Davis	North Carolina A&T	Big South
DB	Elvin De La Rosa	Fayetteville State	CIAA
OL	Matthew Derks	Delaware State	MEAC
DL	De'Shaan Dixon	Norfolk State Spartans	MEAC
OL	Cam Durley	Tennessee State	OVC
DL	James Fagan	Hampton Pirates	Big South
DB	Joshua Flowers	Winston-Salem State	CIAA
DL	Javon Frazier	Virginia State	CIAA
OL	Jaylan Galloway	Fayetteville State	CIAA
DB	Trey Giles	Miles College	SIAC
DE	Antonio Golden	Fort Valley State	SIAC
OL	Tison Gray	South Carolina State	MEAC
WR	Trey Gross	Delaware State	MEAC
QB	Geremy Hickbottom	Tennessee State	OVC
DL	Jamal Holloway	Central State University	SIAC
OL	Savion Hopes	Virginia Union	CIAA
LB	Devon Hunt	Shaw	CIAA
DE	Keyshawn James	Fayetteville State	CIAA
DB	Zafir Kelly	South Carolina State	MEAC
TE	Isiah Macklin	North Carolina Central	MEAC
RB	Jah-Maine Martin	North Carolina A&T	Big South
WR	Marquis McClain	Southern	SWAC
WR	Ryan McDaniel	North Carolina Central	MEAC
DE	Chris Myers	Norfolk State	MEAC
LB	Noah Rainbow-Douglas	North Carolina Central	MEAC
DB	Taeyonn Reynolds	Elizabeth City State	CIAA
OL	De'jour Simpson	North Carolina A&T	Big South
DB	Tevin Singleton	Bowie State	CIAA
K	Jefferson Souza	Virginia Union	CIAA
RB	Isaiah Totten	North Carolina Central	MEAC
WR	Will Vereen	South Carolina State	MEAC
DB	Aaron Walker	Howard	MEAC
WR	Imeek Watkins	Chowan	CIAA
OL	Zachary Wilcox	Virginia State	CIAA
RB	Call Wilkins	Bowie State	CIAA
QB	Bryce Witt	Chowan	CIAA
DB	Myles Wolfolk	Bowie State	CIAA

Team Robinson
Position	Player	School	Conf.
WR	Dee Anderson	Alabama A&M	SWAC
DB	Zach Anderson	Fort Valley State	SIAC
DE	Michael Badejo	Texas Southern	SWAC
LS	Luke Barnes	Alabama State	SWAC
RB	Bishop Bonnett	Florida A&M	SWAC
WR	Shemar Bridges	Fort Valley State	SIAC
DL	Jeremiah Caine	Mississippi Valley State	SWAC
OL	Amari Catchings	Jackson State	SWAC
DL	Christian Clark	Alabama State	SWAC
DB	Rodney Coleman, Jr.	Miles College	SIAC
DB	Antwan Collier	Florida A&M	SWAC
WR	Keith Corbin, III	Jackson State	SWAC
DE	Kailon Davis	Arkansas–Pine Bluff	SWAC
WR	Ke'Lenn Davis	Texas Southern	SWAC
OL	Keenan Forbes	Florida A&M	SWAC
LB	Jerry Garner	Mississippi Valley State	SWAC
OL	Danny Garza	Prairie View A&M	SWAC
LB	Chad Gilchrist	South Carolina State	MEAC
QB	Aqeel Glass	Alabama A&M	SWAC
RB	Ezra Gray	Alabama State	SWAC
DB	Marvin Grunshie	Savannah State	SIAC
LB	Keonte Hampton	Jackson State	SWAC
QB	Felix Harper	Alcorn State	SWAC
WR	Trey Harrell	Arkansas–Pine Bluff	SWAC
OL	Miquail Harvey	Albany State	SIAC
OL	Nathaniel Hines	Texas Southern	SWAC
OL	Jordan Ighofose	Grambling State	SWAC
OL	Jay Jackson-Williams	Florida A&M	SWAC
LB	Untareo Johnson	Bethune-Cookman	SWAC
DB	Coemba Jones	Albany State	SIAC
TE	Taron Mallard	Bethune-Cookman	SWAC
LB	Derrick Mayweather	Florida A&M	SWAC
DB	Daniel Norman	Morehouse College	SIAC
DL	Antwan Owens	Jackson State	SWAC
QB	Jawon Pass	Prairie View A&M	SWAC
OL	Jalen Powell	Norfolk State	MEAC
WR	LeCharles Pringle	Alcorn State	SWAC
WR	Tyrin Ralph	Arkansas–Pine Bluff	SWAC
OL	Jamal Savage	Bethune-Cookman	SWAC
RB	Ladarius Skelton	Southern	SWAC
OL	Jalen Spady	Florida A&M	SWAC
RB	Brett Sylve	Kentucky State	SIAC
DB	Juwan Taylor	Alcorn State	SWAC
DB	Jalon Thigpen	Arkansas–Pine Bluff	SWAC
TE	Montavious Tinch	Miles College	SIAC
K	Rigoberto Tinoco	Benedict College	SIAC
LB	Tim Walton	Texas Southern	SWAC
P	Jonatan Ward	Kentucky State	SIAC
WR	Josh Wilkes	Arkansas–Pine Bluff	SWAC
DL	Savion Williams	Florida A&M	SWAC
OL	Columbus Willis	Alcorn State	SWAC
DB	Al Young	Jackson State	SWAC
DL	Loren Young	Langston University	SAC

== Box score ==
Several game-specific rules were used:

- Teams were limited to two offensive packages, 4–3 defenses, and no blitzing
- No overtime, no replay challenges, and kickoffs only at the start of each half
2022 HBCU Legacy Bowl

Quarter	1	2	3	4	Total
Team Robinson	0	0	6	0	6
Team Gaither	0	6	9	7	22

at Yulman Stadium • New Orleans

- Date: Saturday, February 19, 2022
- Game time: 4:00 p.m. EST
- Game attendance: 5,000
- Referee: Tuta Salaam
- TV: NFL Network
- Box score

Game information

First quarter

- (4:05) GAIT – Calil Wilkins 12-yard pass from Bryce Witt (Jefferson Souza kick failed). Gaither 6–0

Second quarter

- No scoring

Third quarter

- (12:16) GAIT – Jefferson Souza 21-yard field goal. Gaither 9–0
- (7:31) GAIT – Juwan Carter 7-yard run (Jefferson Souza kick failed). Gaither 15–0
- (0:30) ROB – Jawon Pass 1-yard run (Rigoberto Tinoco kick failed). Gaither 15–6

Fourth quarter

- (9:18) GAIT – Geremy Hickbottom 3-yard run (Jefferson Souza kick good). Gaither 22–6

Statistics	ROB	GAIT
First downs	10	22
Plays–yards	49–136	71–344
Rushes–yards	21–31	29–91
Passing yards	105	253
Passing: comp–att–int	11–28–0	27–42–0
Turnovers		
Time of possession	18:27	41:33

Team	Category	Player	Statistics
ROB	Passing	Aqeel Glass (Alabama A&M)	4–15, 51 YDS
ROB	Rushing	Ezra Gray (Alabama State)	4 CAR, 33 YDS
ROB	Receiving	Dee Anderson (Alabama A&M)	3 REC, 33 YDS
GAIT	Passing	Bryce Witt (Chowan)	15–21, 131 YDS, 1 TD
GAIT	Rushing	Bryce Witt (Chowan)	3 CAR, 32 YDS
GAIT	Receiving	Marquis McClain (Southern)	7 REC, 84 YDS
