= 2021 SWAC Football Championship Game (December) =

- Conference Championship
| Prairie View A&M Panthers | Jackson State Tigers |
| (7–4) | (10–1) |
| 10 | 27 |
| Head coach: Eric Dooley | Head coach: Deion Sanders |
| | STATS 15 |
| | 1 | 2 | 3 | 4 | Total |
|---|---|---|---|---|---|
| Prairie View A&M | 7 | 3 | 0 | 0 | 10 |
| Jackson State | 7 | 6 | 14 | 0 | 27 |
- Date: December 4, 2021
- Season: 2021
- Stadium: Mississippi Veterans Memorial Stadium
- Location: Jackson, Mississippi
- Favorite: Jackson State by 8

United States TV coverage
- Network: ESPN2
- Announcers: Tiffany Greene (play-by-play), Jay Walker (analyst), & Tiffany Blackmon (sideline)

2021 Southwestern Athletic Conference football standings
| | Conf. | | | Overall |
| Team | W | | L | W | | L |
|---|---|---|---|---|---|---|
East Division
| No. 22 Jackson State x$ | 8 | – | 0 | 11 | – | 2 |
| No. 25 Florida A&M ^ | 7 | – | 1 | 9 | – | 3 |
| Alabama A&M | 5 | – | 3 | 7 | – | 3 |
| Mississippi Valley State | 3 | – | 5 | 4 | – | 7 |
| Alabama State | 3 | – | 5 | 5 | – | 6 |
| Bethune–Cookman | 2 | – | 6 | 2 | – | 9 |
West Division
| Prairie View A&M x | 6 | – | 2 | 7 | – | 5 |
| Alcorn State | 5 | – | 3 | 6 | – | 5 |
| Grambling State | 3 | – | 5 | 4 | – | 7 |
| Southern | 3 | – | 5 | 4 | – | 7 |
| Texas Southern | 2 | – | 6 | 2 | – | 8 |
| Arkansas–Pine Bluff | 1 | – | 7 | 2 | – | 9 |
Championship: Jackson State 27, Prairie View A&M 10
$ – Conference champion; x – Division champion/co-champions; y – Championship game participant; ^ – FCS playoff participant; Rankings from STATS Poll

The 2021 SWAC Championship Game was a college football game played on December 4, 2021, at Mississippi Veterans Memorial Stadium in Jackson, Mississippi. It was the 23rd edition of the SWAC Championship Game and determined the champion of the Southwestern Athletic Conference (SWAC) for the 2021 season. The game began at 3:00 p.m. CST and aired on ESPN2. The game featured the Jackson State Tigers, the East Division champions, and the Prairie View A&M Panthers, the West Division champions. Sponsored by wireless service provider Cricket and by beverage corporation PepsiCo through their Pepsi Zero Sugar brand, the game was officially known as the 2021 Cricket SWAC Football Championship presented by Pepsi Zero Sugar. The winner of the game received a bid to the Celebration Bowl to face the South Carolina State Bulldogs, champions of the Mid-Eastern Athletic Conference (MEAC).

== Teams ==
=== Prairie View A&M ===
Prairie View A&M clinched its spot in the championship game on November 20, via Jackson State's defeat of Alcorn State.

=== Jackson State ===
Jackson State clinched its spot in the championship game on November 13 after defeating Southern, 21–17. Jackson State clinched home field advantage in the game on November 20 after defeating Alcorn State, 24–10.

== Game summary ==
2021 Cricket SWAC Championship Game presented by Pepsi Zero Sugar

| Quarter | 1 | 2 | 3 | 4 | Total |
|---|---|---|---|---|---|
| Prairie View A&M | 7 | 3 | 0 | 0 | 10 |
| No. 15 Jackson State | 7 | 6 | 14 | 0 | 27 |

at Mississippi Veterans Memorial Stadium, Jackson, MS

- Date: Saturday, December 4, 2021
- Game time: 3:00 p.m. CST
- TV: ESPN2
- Box score

Game information

First quarter

- 3:25 Prairie View A&M – T. Holden pass to J. Howard for 35 yds for a TD (L. Reyes KICK) – 8 plays, 67 yards, 2:49 (Prairie View A&M 7–0(
- 1:04 Jackson State – S. Sanders pass to M. Wideman for 16 yds for a TD (N. Anderson KICK) – 6 plays, 65 yards, 2:21 (tied 7–7)

Second quarter

- 6:38 Prairie View A&M – L. Reyes 37 yd FG GOOD – 9 plays, 60 yards, 4:17 (Prairie View A&M 10–7)
- 6:25 Jackson State – I. Bolden return for 91 yds for a TD (N. Anderson kick missed) (Jackson State 13–10)

Third quarter

- 8:20 Jackson State – J. Pass pass intercepted, J. Houston IV returned 5 yds for a TD (B. Raborn KICK) (Jackson State 20–10)
- 2:39 Jackson State – P. Pickett run for 5 yds for a TD (B. Raborn KICK) – 6 plays, 48 yards, 3:22 (Jackson State 27–10)

=== Statistics ===
| Statistics | PVAMU | JSU |
|---|---|---|
| First downs | | |
| Plays–yards | | |
| Rushes–yards | | |
| Passing yards | | |
| Passing: comp–att–int | | |
| Time of possession | | |

| Team | Category | Player | Statistics |
|---|---|---|---|
| Prairie View A&M | Passing | | |
| Prairie View A&M | Rushing | | |
| Prairie View A&M | Receiving | | |
| Jackson State | Passing | | |
| Jackson State | Rushing | | |
| Jackson State | Receiving | | |
