= Jason Rollins =

American football coach (born c. 1975)

Current position
- Title: Defensive coordinator
- Team: Grambling State
- Conference: SWAC

Biographical details
- Born: c. 1975 (age 50–51); Lake Charles, Louisiana, U.S.
- Education: McNeese State University (1996)

Playing career
- 1994–1996: McNeese State
- Position: Safety

Coaching career (HC unless noted)
- 1997–1998: McNeese State (DB)
- 1999–2000: Ball HS (TX) (assistant)
- 2001: La Marque HS (TX) (assistant)
- 2002–2004: Northwestern State (DB)
- 2005–2006: McNeese State (co-DC/DB)
- 2007–2013: Tulane (DB)
- 2014: Tulane (ST/DB)
- 2015: Tulane (co-DC/DB)
- 2016–2017: UTSA (associate HC/LB)
- 2018–2019: UTSA (DC/S)
- 2020: Southern (ST/S)
- 2021: Southern (interim HC)
- 2023: Louisiana–Monroe (ST)
- 2024–present: Grambling State (DC)

Head coaching record
- Overall: 4–7

Jason Rollins (born c. 1975) is an American college football coach. He is the defensive coordinator for Grambling State University, a position he has held since 2024. He was the interim head football coach for Southern University in 2021 and compiled a 4–7 record. He coached for McNeese State, Ball High School, La Marque High School, Northwestern State, Tulane, UTSA, and Louisiana–Monroe. He played college football for McNeese State as a safety.

== Head coaching record ==
Year	Team	Overall	Conference	Standing	Bowl/playoffs
Southern Jaguars (Southwestern Athletic Conference) (2021)
2021	Southern	4–7	3–5	T–3rd (West)	
Southern:		4–7	3–5		
Total:		4–7			
