= 2021 Grambling State Tigers football team =

American college football season

2021 Grambling State Tigers football
- Conference: Southwestern Athletic Conference
- West Division
- Record: 4–7 (3–5 SWAC)
- Head coach: Broderick Fobbs (8th season; first 10 games); Terrence Graves (interim; remainder of the season)
- Offensive coordinator: Eric Marty
- Defensive coordinator: Everett Todd
- Home stadium: Eddie Robinson Stadium

2021 Southwestern Athletic Conference football standings
	Conf.			Overall
Team	W		L	W		L
East Division
No. 22 Jackson State x$	8	–	0	11	–	2
No. 25 Florida A&M ^	7	–	1	9	–	3
Alabama A&M	5	–	3	7	–	3
Mississippi Valley State	3	–	5	4	–	7
Alabama State	3	–	5	5	–	6
Bethune–Cookman	2	–	6	2	–	9
West Division
Prairie View A&M x	6	–	2	7	–	5
Alcorn State	5	–	3	6	–	5
Grambling State	3	–	5	4	–	7
Southern	3	–	5	4	–	7
Texas Southern	2	–	6	2	–	8
Arkansas–Pine Bluff	1	–	7	2	–	9
Championship: Jackson State 27, Prairie View A&M 10
$ – Conference champion; x – Division champion/co-champions; y – Championship game participant; ^ – FCS playoff participant; Rankings from STATS Poll

The 2021 Grambling State Tigers football team represented Grambling State University in the 2021 NCAA Division I FCS football season. The Tigers were led by eighth-year head coach Broderick Fobbs for the first ten games before he was fired on November 15, with linebackers coach and special teams coordinator Terrence Graves being named interim head coach. They played their home games at Eddie Robinson Stadium in Grambling, Louisiana as members of the West Division of the Southwestern Athletic Conference (SWAC).

== Schedule ==
Date	Time	Opponent	Site	TV	Result	Attendance
September 5	3:00 p.m.	vs. Tennessee State*	Tom Benson Hall of Fame Stadium; Canton, OH (Black College Football Hall of Fame Classic)	NFLN	W 16–10	14,682
September 11	6:00 p.m.	at Southern Miss*	M. M. Roberts Stadium; Hattiesburg, MS	ESPN3	L 0–37	25,235
September 18	6:00 p.m.	at Houston*	TDECU Stadium; Houston, TX	ESPN+	L 0–45	22,998
September 25	4:00 p.m.	vs. Prairie View A&M	Cotton Bowl; Dallas, TX (State Fair Classic)		L 10–24	26,198
October 2	2:00 p.m.	Alabama A&M	Eddie Robinson Stadium; Grambling, LA	ESPN3	W 37-28	6,714
October 9	2:00 p.m.	at Alcorn State	Casem-Spinks Stadium; Lorman, MS	ESPN+	L 20-24	14,500
October 16	2:00 p.m.	Texas Southern^{†}	Eddie Robinson Stadium; Grambling, LA		W 34-20	9,231
October 30	3:00 p.m.	at Florida A&M	Bragg Memorial Stadium; Tallahassee, FL	ESPN3	L 3-26	31,887
November 6	2:00 p.m.	at Arkansas–Pine Bluff	Simmons Bank Field; Pine Bluff, AR	ESPN3	L 26-33	6,129
November 13	2:00 p.m.	Bethune–Cookman	Eddie Robinson Stadium; Grambling, LA		L 14-31	5,017
November 27	4:00 p.m.	vs. Southern	Caesars Superdome; New Orleans, LA (Bayou Classic)	NBCSN	W 29–26	55,791
*Non-conference game; ^{†}Homecoming; All times are in Central time

== Game summaries ==
=== Vs. Tennessee State ===
Tennessee State Tigers at Grambling State Tigers

Quarter	1	2	3	4	Total
Tennessee State	3	0	7	0	10
Grambling State	0	7	6	3	16

at Pro Football Hall of Fame Fieldhouse, Canton, OH

- Date: September 11, 2021
- Game time: 3:00 P.M. MST
- Game weather: 61 °F (16 °C) • Weather: Sunny • Wind: 3 mph
- Game attendance: 14,682
- Referee:
- TV announcers (NFL Network):

Statistics	TSU Tigers	GRAM Tigers
First downs		
Plays–yards	–	–
Rushes–yards	–	–
Passing yards		
Passing: comp–att–int	––	––
Time of possession		

Team	Category	Player	Statistics
TSU Tigers	Passing		
TSU Tigers	Rushing		
TSU Tigers	Receiving		
GRAM Tigers	Passing		
GRAM Tigers	Rushing		
GRAM Tigers	Receiving		

Scoring summary

Quarter	Time	Drive			Team	Scoring information	Score	
Quarter	Time	Plays	Yards	TOP	Team	Scoring information	TSU	GRAM
1	5:00	7	21	4:05	TENN	39-yard field goal by Antonio Zita	3	0
2	12:41	15	79	7:14	GRAM	Jaye Patrick 18-yard touchdown reception from Elijah Walker, Garrett Urban kick good	3	7
3	7:03	12	58	6:08	TENN	Devon Starling 3-yard touchdown run, Antonio Zita kick good	10	7
3	2:22	3	15	1:25	GRAM	Elijah Walker 15-yard touchdown run, Antonio Zita kick no good	10	13
4	9:48	10	44	5:05	GRAM	24-yard field goal by Garrett Urban	10	16
"TOP" = time of possession. For other American football terms, see Glossary of American football.							10	16

=== At Southern Miss ===
Grambling State Tigers at Southern Miss Golden Eagles

Quarter	1	2	3	4	Total
Grambling State	0	0	0	0	0
Southern Miss	7	3	10	17	37

at M.M. Roberts Stadium, Hattiesburg, MS

- Date: September 11th
- Game time: 6:00 P.M. CST
- Game attendance: 25,235
- Referee:
- TV announcers (ESPN3):

Statistics	GRAM	USM
First downs	9	22
Plays–yards	141	439
Rushes–yards	51	290
Passing yards	90	149
Passing: comp–att–int	1	1
Time of possession	28:00	32:10

Team	Category	Player	Statistics
GRAM	Passing	Aldon Clark	8/19, 60 yards, INT
GRAM	Rushing	Darqueze Brutton	8 rushes, 35 yards
GRAM	Receiving	Donald Johnson III	3 receptions, 26 yards
USM	Passing	Trey Lowe	10/13, 99 yards, TD
USM	Rushing	Frank Gore Jr.	21 rushes, 162 yards, TD
USM	Receiving	Jakarius Caston	4 receptions, 50 yards, TD

Scoring summary

Quarter	Time	Drive			Team	Scoring information	Score	
Quarter	Time	Plays	Yards	TOP	Team	Scoring information	GRAM	USM
{{{Quarter}}}					{{{Team}}}		{{{Visitor}}}	{{{Home}}}
"TOP" = time of possession. For other American football terms, see Glossary of American football.								

=== at Houston ===
Grambling State Tigers at Houston Cougars

Quarter	1	2	3	4	Total
Grambling State	0	0	0	0	0
Houston	7	14	21	3	45

at TDECU Stadium, Houston, TX

- Date: September 18th
- Game time: 6:00 P.M. CST
- Game attendance: 22,998
- Referee: Nate Black
- TV announcers (ESPN+): Alex Del Barrio (play–by–play) and Stanford Routt (analyst)

Statistics	GRAM	HOU
First downs	3	24
Plays–yards	102	422
Rushes–yards	53	164
Passing yards	49	258
Passing: comp–att–int	1	1
Time of possession	25:02	34:58

Team	Category	Player	Statistics
GRAM	Passing	Aldon Clark	5/12, 49 yards
GRAM	Rushing	Darqueze Brutton	9 rushes, 18 yards
GRAM	Receiving	Greg White	1 reception, 37 yards
HOU	Passing	Ike Ogbogu	14/22, 196 yards, 2 TDs
HOU	Rushing	Alton McCaskill	16 rushes, 114 yards, 2 TDs
HOU	Receiving	Tank Dell	8 receptions, 134 yards, 2 TDs

Scoring summary

Quarter	Time	Drive			Team	Scoring information	Score	
Quarter	Time	Plays	Yards	TOP	Team	Scoring information	GRAM	HOU
1	0:15	6	47	2:06	HOU	Nathaniel Dell 16-yard touchdown reception from Ike Ogbogu, Dalton Witherspoon kick good	0	7
2	10:40	3	3	1:57	HOU	Punt returned 48 yards for touchdown by Marcus Jones, Dalton Witherspoon kick good	0	14
2	5:23	8	80	3:03	HOU	Alton McCaskill 17-yard touchdown run, Dalton Witherspoon kick good	0	21
3	11:54	4	48	0:59	HOU	Alton McCaskill 34-yard touchdown run, Dalton Witherspoon kick good	0	28
3	7:01	7	56	3:32	HOU	Nathaniel Dell 10-yard touchdown reception from Ike Ogbogu, Dalton Witherspoon kick good	0	35
3	2:03	6	58	3:06	HOU	Ta'Zhawn Henry 1-yard touchdown run, Dalton Witherspoon kick good	0	42
4	6:10	15	62	8:38	HOU	22-yard field goal by Dalton Witherspoon	0	45
"TOP" = time of possession. For other American football terms, see Glossary of American football.							GRAM	HOU

=== Vs. Prairie View A&M ===
Grambling State Tigers at Prairie View A&M Panthers

Quarter	1	2	3	4	Total
Grambling State	0	7	3	0	10
Prairie View A&M	7	3	7	7	24

at Cotton Bowl, Dallas, TX

- Date: September 25th
- Game time: 4:00 P.M. CST
- Game attendance:
- Referee:
- TV announcers ( ):

Statistics	GRAM	PRA
First downs		
Plays–yards	–	–
Rushes–yards	–	–
Passing yards		
Passing: comp–att–int	––	––
Time of possession		

Team	Category	Player	Statistics
GRAM	Passing		
GRAM	Rushing		
GRAM	Receiving		
PRA	Passing		
PRA	Rushing		
PRA	Receiving		

Scoring summary

Quarter	Time	Drive			Team	Scoring information	Score	
Quarter	Time	Plays	Yards	TOP	Team	Scoring information	GRAM	PRA
{{{Quarter}}}					{{{Team}}}		{{{Visitor}}}	{{{Home}}}
"TOP" = time of possession. For other American football terms, see Glossary of American football.								

=== Vs. Alabama A&M ===
Alabama A&M Bulldogs at Grambling State Tigers

Quarter	1	2	4	Total
Alabama A&M	0	0	0	0
Grambling State	0	0	0	0

at Eddie Robinson Stadium, Grambling, LA

- Date: October 2nd
- Game time: 2:00 P.M. CST
- Game attendance:
- Referee:
- TV announcers (ESPN3):

Statistics	ALA A&M	GRAM
First downs		
Plays–yards	–	–
Rushes–yards	–	–
Passing yards		
Passing: comp–att–int	––	––
Time of possession		

Team	Category	Player	Statistics
ALA A&M	Passing		
ALA A&M	Rushing		
ALA A&M	Receiving		
GRAM	Passing		
GRAM	Rushing		
GRAM	Receiving		

Scoring summary

Quarter	Time	Drive			Team	Scoring information	Score	
Quarter	Time	Plays	Yards	TOP	Team	Scoring information	ALA A&M	GRAM
{{{Quarter}}}					{{{Team}}}		{{{Visitor}}}	{{{Home}}}
"TOP" = time of possession. For other American football terms, see Glossary of American football.								

=== at. Alcorn State ===
Grambling State Tigers at Alcrom State Braves

Quarter	1	2	4	Total
Grambling State	0	0	0	0
Alcron State	0	0	0	0

at Casem-Spinks Stadium, Lorman, MS

- Date: October 9th
- Game time: CST
- Game attendance:
- Referee:
- TV announcers (ESPN3):

Statistics	GRAM	ALC State
First downs		
Plays–yards	–	–
Rushes–yards	–	–
Passing yards		
Passing: comp–att–int	––	––
Time of possession		

Team	Category	Player	Statistics
GRAM	Passing		
GRAM	Rushing		
GRAM	Receiving		
ALC State	Passing		
ALC State	Rushing		
ALC State	Receiving		

Scoring summary

Quarter	Time	Drive			Team	Scoring information	Score	
Quarter	Time	Plays	Yards	TOP	Team	Scoring information	GRAM	ALC State
{{{Quarter}}}					{{{Team}}}		{{{Visitor}}}	{{{Home}}}
"TOP" = time of possession. For other American football terms, see Glossary of American football.								

=== Vs. Texas Southern ===
, Homecoming Game

Texas Southern Tigers at Grambling State Tigers

Quarter	1	2	4	Total
Texas Southern	0	0	0	0
Grambling State	0	0	0	0

at Eddie Robinson State, Grambling, LA

- Date: October 14th
- Game time: 2:00 P.M. CST
- Game attendance:
- Referee:
- TV announcers ( ):

Statistics	TEX	GRAM
First downs		
Plays–yards	–	–
Rushes–yards	–	–
Passing yards		
Passing: comp–att–int	––	––
Time of possession		

Team	Category	Player	Statistics
TEX	Passing		
TEX	Rushing		
TEX	Receiving		
GRAM	Passing		
GRAM	Rushing		
GRAM	Receiving		

Scoring summary

Quarter	Time	Drive			Team	Scoring information	Score	
Quarter	Time	Plays	Yards	TOP	Team	Scoring information	TEX	GRAM
{{{Quarter}}}					{{{Team}}}		{{{Visitor}}}	{{{Home}}}
"TOP" = time of possession. For other American football terms, see Glossary of American football.								

=== at. Florida A&M ===
Grambling State Tigers at Florida A&M Rattlers

Quarter	1	2	4	Total
Grambling State	0	0	0	0
Florida A&M	0	0	0	0

at Bragg Memorial Stadium, Tallahassee, Florida

- Date: October 30th
- Game time: 3:00 P.M. CST
- Game attendance:
- Referee:
- TV announcers (ESPN3):

Statistics	GRAM	FL A&M
First downs		
Plays–yards	–	–
Rushes–yards	–	–
Passing yards		
Passing: comp–att–int	––	––
Time of possession		

Team	Category	Player	Statistics
GRAM	Passing		
GRAM	Rushing		
GRAM	Receiving		
FL A&M	Passing		
FL A&M	Rushing		
FL A&M	Receiving		

Scoring summary

Quarter	Time	Drive			Team	Scoring information	Score	
Quarter	Time	Plays	Yards	TOP	Team	Scoring information	GRAM	FL A&M
{{{Quarter}}}					{{{Team}}}		{{{Visitor}}}	{{{Home}}}
"TOP" = time of possession. For other American football terms, see Glossary of American football.								

=== At Arkansas–Pine Bluff ===
Grambling State Tigers at Arkansas–Pine Bluff Golden Lions

Quarter	1	2	4	Total
Grambling State	0	0	0	0
Arkansas–Pine Bluff	0	0	0	0

at Simmons Bank Field, Pine Bluff, AR

- Date: November 6th
- Game time: 2:00 P.M. CST
- Game attendance:
- Referee:
- TV announcers (ESPN3):

Statistics	GRAM	ARK
First downs		
Plays–yards	–	–
Rushes–yards	–	–
Passing yards		
Passing: comp–att–int	––	––
Time of possession		

Team	Category	Player	Statistics
GRAM	Passing		
GRAM	Rushing		
GRAM	Receiving		
ARK	Passing		
ARK	Rushing		
ARK	Receiving		

Scoring summary

Quarter	Time	Drive			Team	Scoring information	Score	
Quarter	Time	Plays	Yards	TOP	Team	Scoring information	GRAM	ARK
{{{Quarter}}}					{{{Team}}}		{{{Visitor}}}	{{{Home}}}
"TOP" = time of possession. For other American football terms, see Glossary of American football.								

=== vs Bethune–Cookman ===
Bethune–Cookman Wildcats at Grambling State Tigers

Quarter	1	2	4	Total
Bethune–Cookman	0	0	0	0
Grambling State	0	0	0	0

at Eddie Robinson Stadium, Grambling, LA

- Date: November 13th
- Game time: 2:00 P.M. CST
- Game attendance:
- Referee:
- TV announcers ( ):

Statistics	Bethune–Cookman	Grambling State
First downs		
Plays–yards	–	–
Rushes–yards	–	–
Passing yards		
Passing: comp–att–int	––	––
Time of possession		

Team	Category	Player	Statistics
Bethune–Cookman	Passing		
Bethune–Cookman	Rushing		
Bethune–Cookman	Receiving		
Grambling State	Passing		
Grambling State	Rushing		
Grambling State	Receiving		

Scoring summary

Quarter	Time	Drive			Team	Scoring information	Score	
Quarter	Time	Plays	Yards	TOP	Team	Scoring information	Beth	GRAM
{{{Quarter}}}					{{{Team}}}		{{{Visitor}}}	{{{Home}}}
"TOP" = time of possession. For other American football terms, see Glossary of American football.								

=== Vs. Southern ===
Grambling State Tigers at Southern Jaguars

Quarter	1	2	3	4	Total
Grambling State	7	9	3	10	29
Southern	10	3	0	13	26

at Caesars Superdome, New Orleans, LA

- Date: November 27th
- Game time: 4:00 P.M. CST
- Game weather: 61 °F (16 °C) • Weather: Mostly Sunny • Wind: SW 4 MPH
- Game attendance: 55,791
- Referee:
- TV announcers (NBCSN):

Statistics	Grambling State	Southern
First downs		
Plays–yards	–	–
Rushes–yards	–	–
Passing yards		
Passing: comp–att–int	––	––
Time of possession		

Team	Category	Player	Statistics
Grambling State	Passing		
Grambling State	Rushing		
Grambling State	Receiving		
Southern	Passing		
Southern	Rushing		
Southern	Receiving		

Scoring summary

Quarter	Time	Drive			Team	Scoring information	Score	
Quarter	Time	Plays	Yards	TOP	Team	Scoring information	GRAMBLING STATE	SOUTHERN
{{{Quarter}}}					{{{Team}}}		{{{Visitor}}}	{{{Home}}}
"TOP" = time of possession. For other American football terms, see Glossary of American football.								
