= 2021 Bethune–Cookman Wildcats football team =

American college football season

2021 Bethune–Cookman Wildcats football
- Conference: Southwestern Athletic Conference
- East Division
- Record: 2–9 (2–6 SWAC)
- Head coach: Terry Sims (6th season)
- Offensive coordinator: Aaron James (1st season)
- Defensive coordinator: Charles Jones (11th season)
- Home stadium: Daytona Stadium

2021 Southwestern Athletic Conference football standings
	Conf.			Overall
Team	W		L	W		L
East Division
No. 22 Jackson State x$	8	–	0	11	–	2
No. 25 Florida A&M ^	7	–	1	9	–	3
Alabama A&M	5	–	3	7	–	3
Mississippi Valley State	3	–	5	4	–	7
Alabama State	3	–	5	5	–	6
Bethune–Cookman	2	–	6	2	–	9
West Division
Prairie View A&M x	6	–	2	7	–	5
Alcorn State	5	–	3	6	–	5
Grambling State	3	–	5	4	–	7
Southern	3	–	5	4	–	7
Texas Southern	2	–	6	2	–	8
Arkansas–Pine Bluff	1	–	7	2	–	9
Championship: Jackson State 27, Prairie View A&M 10
$ – Conference champion; x – Division champion/co-champions; y – Championship game participant; ^ – FCS playoff participant; Rankings from STATS Poll

The 2021 Bethune–Cookman Wildcats football team represented Bethune–Cookman University in the 2021 NCAA Division I FCS football season. The Wildcats played their home games at Daytona Stadium in Daytona Beach, Florida, and competed in the East Division of the Southwestern Athletic Conference (SWAC). They were led by sixth-year head coach Terry Sims.

== Schedule ==
Date	Time	Opponent	Site	TV	Result	Attendance
September 4	9:00 p.m.	at UTEP*	Sun Bowl; El Paso, TX	ESPN3	L 28–38	14,554
September 11	6:30 p.m.	at UCF*	Bounce House; Orlando, FL	ESPN+	L 14–63	38,443
September 16	7:30 p.m.	Alabama A&M	Daytona Stadium; Daytona Beach, FL	ESPNU	L 27–30	4,173
September 25	6:00 p.m.	at Alabama State	New ASU Stadium; Montgomery, AL	ESPN3	L 24–38	9,450
October 2	1:30 p.m.	at South Carolina State*	Oliver C. Dawson Stadium; Orangeburg, SC	ESPN+	L 35–42	6,153
October 9	5:00 p.m.	Mississippi Valley State^{†}	Daytona Stadium; Daytona Beach, FL	YouTube	L 14–20	10,178
October 16	4:00 p.m.	Prairie View A&M	Daytona Stadium; Daytona Beach, FL	YouTube	L 29-35	3,267
October 23	2:00 p.m.	at No. 24 Jackson State	Mississippi Veterans Memorial Stadium; Jackson, MS	ESPN3	L 12-42	26,428
November 6	12:00 p.m.	Alcorn State	Daytona Stadium; Daytona Beach, FL	ESPN+	W 35-31	3,673
November 13	3:00 p.m.	at Grambling State	Eddie Robinson Stadium; Grambling, LA		W 31-14	5,017
November 20	3:30 p.m.	vs. No. 23 Florida A&M	Camping World Stadium; Orlando, FL (Florida Classic)	ESPN3	L 21-46	54,198
*Non-conference game; ^{†}Homecoming; Rankings from STATS Poll released prior to the game; All times are in Eastern time

== Game summaries ==
=== At UTEP ===
Bethune–Cookman at Texas–El Paso

Team	1	2	3	4	Total
Wildcats	0	0	14	14	28
• Miners	10	0	7	21	38

- Date: September 4, 2021
- Location: Sun Bowl
  El Paso, TX
- Game start: 7:05 p.m. MDT
- Elapsed time: 3 hours and 20 minutes
- Game attendance: 14,554
- Game weather: Temperature: 91 °F (33 °C) • Weather: Sunny • Wind: E 8 MPH
- Referee: Ed Ardito
- TV announcers (ESPN3): Erik Elken (play–by–play) and Trevor Vittatoe (analyst)

Scoring summary
1	08:13	UTEP	Gavin Baechle 22–yard field goal (4 plays, 5 yards, 1:30)	UTEP 3–0
1	00:39	UTEP	Trent Thompson 2–yard pass from Gavin Hardison (Gavin Baechle kick) (12 plays, 78 yards, 5:05)	UTEP 10–0
3	13:33	BCU	Marcus Riley 4–yard pass from Shannon Patrick (Dylan Moghaddam kick) (2 plays, 6 yards, 0:42)	UTEP 10–7
3	06:41	UTEP	Calvin Brownholtz 1–yard run (Gavin Baechle kick) (13 plays, 72 yards, 6:46)	UTEP 17–7
3	03:31	BCU	Kemari Averett 7–yard pass from Shannon Patrick (Dylan Moghaddam kick) (6 plays, 89 yards, 3:04)	UTEP 17–14
4	12:59	UTEP	Jacob Cowing 6–yard pass from Gavin Hardison (Gavin Baechle kick) (10 plays, 83 yards, 5:27)	UTEP 24–14
4	10:44	UTEP	Justin Garrett 8–yard pass from Gavin Hardison (Gavin Baechle kick) (3 plays, 49 yards, 1:15)	UTEP 31–14
4	05:28	BCU	Que'shaun Byrd 2–yard run (Dylan Moghaddam kick) (9 plays, 87 yards, 5:12)	UTEP 31–21
4	02:15	UTEP	Ronald Awatt 19–yard run (Gavin Baechle kick) (6 plays, 50 yards, 3:13)	UTEP 38–21
4	01:17	BCU	Aaron Thompson 3–yard run (Dylan Moghaddam kick) (3 plays, 75 yards, 0:58)	UTEP 38–28

Statistics	Bethune–Cookman	UTEP
First downs	12	24
Total yards	333	472
Rushing yards	118	289
Passing yards	215	183
Turnovers	3	4
Time of possession	24:26	35:34

Team	Category	Player	Statistics
Bethune–Cookman	Passing	Shannon Patrick	15/22, 215 yards, 2 TDs, 1 INT
Bethune–Cookman	Rushing	Que'shaun Byrd	12 carries, 98 yards, 1 TD
Bethune–Cookman	Receiving	Kemari Averett	4 receptions, 72 yards, 1 TD
UTEP	Passing	Gavin Hardison	14/23, 183 yards, 3 TDs
UTEP	Rushing	Ronald Awatt	19 carries, 126 yards, 1 TD
UTEP	Receiving	Tyrin Smith	4 receptions, 76 yards

=== At UCF ===
Bethune–Cookman at Central Florida

Team	1	2	3	4	Total
Wildcats	7	0	7	0	14
• Knights	14	21	21	7	63

- Date: September 11, 2021
- Location: Bounce House
  Orlando, FL
- Game start: 6:30 p.m. EDT
- Elapsed time:
- Game attendance:
- Game weather: • Weather: TBD • Wind: TBD
- Referee:
- TV announcers (ESPN+): Drew Fellios (play-by-play) and Leger Douzable (analyst)

Scoring summary
1
2
3
4

Statistics	Bethune–Cookman	UCF
First downs		
Total yards		
Rushing yards		
Passing yards		
Turnovers		
Time of possession		

Team	Category	Player	Statistics
Bethune–Cookman	Passing		
Bethune–Cookman	Rushing		
Bethune–Cookman	Receiving		
UCF	Passing		
UCF	Rushing		
UCF	Receiving		

=== Alabama A&M ===
Alabama A&M at Bethune–Cookman

Team	1	2	Total
Bulldogs			0
Wildcats			0

- Date: September 16, 2021
- Location: Daytona Stadium
  Daytona Beach, FL
- Game start: 7:30 p.m. EDT
- Elapsed time:
- Game attendance:
- Game weather: • Weather: TBD • Wind: TBD
- Referee:
- TV announcers (ESPNU):

Scoring summary
1
2
3
4

Statistics	Alabama A&M	Bethune–Cookman
First downs		
Total yards		
Rushing yards		
Passing yards		
Turnovers		
Time of possession		

Team	Category	Player	Statistics
Alabama A&M	Passing		
Alabama A&M	Rushing		
Alabama A&M	Receiving		
Bethune–Cookman	Passing		
Bethune–Cookman	Rushing		
Bethune–Cookman	Receiving		

=== At Alabama State ===
Alabama State at Bethune–Cookman

Team	1	2	Total
Hornets			0
Wildcats			0

- Date: September 25, 2021
- Location: New ASU Stadium
  Montgomery, AL
- Game start: 6:00 p.m. EDT
- Elapsed time:
- Game attendance:
- Game weather: • Weather: TBD • Wind: TBD
- Referee:
- TV announcers (ESPN3):

Scoring summary
1
2
3
4

Statistics	Bethune–Cookman	Alabama State
First downs		
Total yards		
Rushing yards		
Passing yards		
Turnovers		
Time of possession		

Team	Category	Player	Statistics
Bethune–Cookman	Passing		
Bethune–Cookman	Rushing		
Bethune–Cookman	Receiving		
Alabama State	Passing		
Alabama State	Rushing		
Alabama State	Receiving		

=== At South Carolina State ===
Bethune–Cookman at South Carolina State

Team	1	2	Total
Wildcats			0
Bulldogs			0

- Date: October 2, 2021
- Location: Oliver C. Dawson Stadium
  Orangeburg, SC
- Game start: 1:30 p.m. EDT
- Elapsed time:
- Game attendance:
- Game weather: • Weather: TBD • Wind: TBD
- Referee:
- TV announcers ( ):

Scoring summary
1
2
3
4

Statistics	Bethune–Cookman	South Carolina State
First downs		
Total yards		
Rushing yards		
Passing yards		
Turnovers		
Time of possession		

Team	Category	Player	Statistics
Bethune–Cookman	Passing		
Bethune–Cookman	Rushing		
Bethune–Cookman	Receiving		
South Carolina State	Passing		
South Carolina State	Rushing		
South Carolina State	Receiving		

=== Mississippi Valley State ===
Mississippi Valley State at Bethune–Cookman

Team	1	2	Total
Delta Devils			0
Wildcats			0

- Date: October 9, 2021
- Location: Daytona Stadium
  Daytona Beach, FL
- Game start: 5:00 p.m. EDT
- Elapsed time:
- Game attendance:
- Game weather: • Weather: TBD • Wind: TBD
- Referee:
- TV announcers ( ):

Scoring summary
1
2
3
4

Statistics	Mississippi Valley State	Bethune–Cookman
First downs		
Total yards		
Rushing yards		
Passing yards		
Turnovers		
Time of possession		

Team	Category	Player	Statistics
Mississippi Valley State	Passing		
Mississippi Valley State	Rushing		
Mississippi Valley State	Receiving		
Bethune–Cookman	Passing		
Bethune–Cookman	Rushing		
Bethune–Cookman	Receiving		

=== Prairie View A&M ===
Prairie View A&M at Bethune–Cookman

Team	1	2	Total
Panthers			0
Wildcats			0

- Date: October 16, 2021
- Location: Daytona Stadium
  Daytona Beach, FL
- Game start: 4:00 p.m. EDT
- Elapsed time:
- Game attendance:
- Game weather: • Weather: TBD • Wind: TBD
- Referee:
- TV announcers ( ):

Scoring summary
1
2
3
4

Statistics	Prairie View A&M	Bethune–Cookman
First downs		
Total yards		
Rushing yards		
Passing yards		
Turnovers		
Time of possession		

Team	Category	Player	Statistics
Prairie View A&M	Passing		
Prairie View A&M	Rushing		
Prairie View A&M	Receiving		
Bethune–Cookman	Passing		
Bethune–Cookman	Rushing		
Bethune–Cookman	Receiving		

=== At No. 24 Jackson State ===
Bethune–Cookman at Jackson State

Team	1	2	Total
Wildcats			0
No. 24 Tigers			0

- Date: October 23, 2021
- Location: Mississippi Veterans Memorial Stadium
  Jackson, MS
- Game start: 2:00 p.m. EDT
- Elapsed time:
- Game attendance:
- Game weather: • Weather: TBD • Wind: TBD
- Referee:
- TV announcers (ESPN3):

Scoring summary
1
2
3
4

Statistics	Bethune–Cookman	Jackson State
First downs		
Total yards		
Rushing yards		
Passing yards		
Turnovers		
Time of possession		

Team	Category	Player	Statistics
Bethune–Cookman	Passing		
Bethune–Cookman	Rushing		
Bethune–Cookman	Receiving		
Jackson State	Passing		
Jackson State	Rushing		
Jackson State	Receiving		

=== Alcorn State ===
Alcorn State at Bethune–Cookman

Team	1	2	Total
Braves			0
Wildcats			0

- Date: November 6, 2021
- Location: Daytona Stadium
  Daytona Beach, FL
- Game start: TBD EDT
- Elapsed time:
- Game attendance:
- Game weather: • Weather: TBD • Wind: TBD
- Referee:
- TV announcers ( ):

Scoring summary
1
2
3
4

Statistics	Alcorn State	Bethune–Cookman
First downs		
Total yards		
Rushing yards		
Passing yards		
Turnovers		
Time of possession		

Team	Category	Player	Statistics
Alcorn State	Passing		
Alcorn State	Rushing		
Alcorn State	Receiving		
Bethune–Cookman	Passing		
Bethune–Cookman	Rushing		
Bethune–Cookman	Receiving		

=== At Grambling State ===
Bethune–Cookman at Grambling State

Team	1	2	Total
Wildcats			0
Tigers			0

- Date: November 13, 2021
- Location: Eddie Robinson Stadium
  Grambling, LA
- Game start: 3:00 p.m. EST
- Elapsed time:
- Game attendance:
- Game weather: • Weather: TBD • Wind: TBD
- Referee:
- TV announcers ( ):

Scoring summary
1
2
3
4

Statistics	Bethune–Cookman	Grambling State
First downs		
Total yards		
Rushing yards		
Passing yards		
Turnovers		
Time of possession		

Team	Category	Player	Statistics
Bethune–Cookman	Passing		
Bethune–Cookman	Rushing		
Bethune–Cookman	Receiving		
Grambling State	Passing		
Grambling State	Rushing		
Grambling State	Receiving		

=== Vs. No. 23 Florida A&M ===
Florida A&M vs. Bethune–Cookman

Team	1	2	Total
No. 23 Rattlers			0
Wildcats			0

- Date: November 20, 2021
- Location: Camping World Stadium
  Orlando, FL
- Game start: TBD EST
- Elapsed time:
- Game attendance:
- Game weather: • Weather: TBD • Wind: TBD
- Referee:
- TV announcers (ESPN3):

Scoring summary
1
2
3
4

Statistics	Florida A&M	Bethune–Cookman
First downs		
Total yards		
Rushing yards		
Passing yards		
Turnovers		
Time of possession		

Team	Category	Player	Statistics
Florida A&M	Passing		
Florida A&M	Rushing		
Florida A&M	Receiving		
Bethune–Cookman	Passing		
Bethune–Cookman	Rushing		
Bethune–Cookman	Receiving		
