= 2021 Prairie View A&M Panthers football team =

American college football season

2021 Prairie View A&M Panthers football
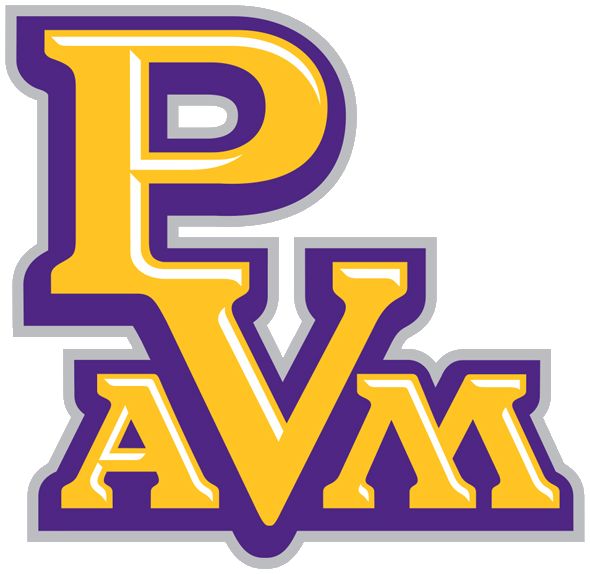

SWAC West Division champion

SWAC Championship Game, L 10–27 vs. Jackson State
- Conference: Southwestern Athletic Conference
- West Division
- Record: 7–5 (6–2 SWAC)
- Head coach: Eric Dooley (4th season)
- Defensive coordinator: Henry Miller (3rd season)
- Home stadium: Panther Stadium at Blackshear Field

2021 Southwestern Athletic Conference football standings
	Conf.			Overall
Team	W		L	W		L
East Division
No. 22 Jackson State x$	8	–	0	11	–	2
No. 25 Florida A&M ^	7	–	1	9	–	3
Alabama A&M	5	–	3	7	–	3
Mississippi Valley State	3	–	5	4	–	7
Alabama State	3	–	5	5	–	6
Bethune–Cookman	2	–	6	2	–	9
West Division
Prairie View A&M x	6	–	2	7	–	5
Alcorn State	5	–	3	6	–	5
Grambling State	3	–	5	4	–	7
Southern	3	–	5	4	–	7
Texas Southern	2	–	6	2	–	8
Arkansas–Pine Bluff	1	–	7	2	–	9
Championship: Jackson State 27, Prairie View A&M 10
$ – Conference champion; x – Division champion/co-champions; y – Championship game participant; ^ – FCS playoff participant; Rankings from STATS Poll

The 2021 Prairie View A&M Panthers football team represented Prairie View A&M University in the 2021 NCAA Division I FCS football season. The Panthers played their home games at Panther Stadium at Blackshear Field in Prairie View, Texas, and competed in the West Division of the Southwestern Athletic Conference (SWAC). They were led by fourth-year head coach Eric Dooley.

== Schedule ==
Date	Time	Opponent	Rank	Site	TV	Result	Attendance
September 4	7:00 p.m.	at Texas Southern		BBVA Stadium; Houston, TX (Labor Day Classic)	ESPN3	W 40–17	18,297
September 11	7:00 p.m.	at Incarnate Word*		Gayle and Tom Benson Stadium; San Antonio, TX	ESPN+	L 9–40	2,517
September 18	6:00 p.m.	Houston Baptist*		Panther Stadium at Blackshear Field; Prairie View, TX		W 37–27	8,476
September 25	4:00 p.m.	vs. Grambling State		Cotton Bowl; Dallas, TX (State Fair Classic)		W 24–10	26,198
September 30	6:00 p.m.	Arkansas–Pine Bluff		Panther Stadium at Blackshear Field; Prairie View, TX	ESPNU	W 27–17	8,467
October 16	3:00 p.m.	at Bethune–Cookman		Daytona Stadium; Daytona Beach, FL	YouTube	W 35–29	3,267
October 23	6:00 p.m.	at Southern		A. W. Mumford Stadium; Baton Rouge, LA	ESPN3	W 48–21	24,580
November 6	2:00 p.m.	Alabama State		Panther Stadium at Blackshear Field; Prairie View, TX		W 24–20	6,107
November 13	2:00 p.m.	at Alcorn State	No. 24	Casem-Spinks Stadium; Lorman, MS		L 29–31	0
November 20	11:00 a.m.	at No. 16 (FBS) Texas A&M*		Kyle Field; College Station, TX	ESPN+/SECN+	L 3–52	98,251
November 27	2:00 p.m.	Mississippi Valley State		Panther Stadium at Blackshear Field; Prairie View, TX	ESPN3	L 19–24	724
December 4	3:00 p.m.	at No. 15 Jackson State		Mississippi Veterans Memorial Stadium; Jackson, MS (SWAC Championship Game)	ESPN2	L 10–27	50,128
*Non-conference game; Rankings from STATS Poll released prior to the game; All times are in Eastern time

== Game summaries ==
=== At Texas Southern ===
Prairie View A&M at Texas Southern

Team	1	2	3	4	Total
• Panthers	6	14	10	10	40
Tigers	3	0	7	7	17

- Date: September 4, 2021
- Location: BBVA Stadium
  Houston, TX
- Game start: 7:00 p.m. CDT
- Elapsed time:
- Game attendance:
- Game weather: • Weather: TBD • Wind: TBD
- Referee:
- TV announcers (ESPN3):

Scoring summary
1
2
3
4

Statistics	Prairie View A&M	Texas Southern
First downs		
Total yards		
Rushing yards		
Passing yards		
Turnovers		
Time of possession		

Team	Category	Player	Statistics
Prairie View A&M	Passing		
Prairie View A&M	Rushing		
Prairie View A&M	Receiving		
Texas Southern	Passing		
Texas Southern	Rushing		
Texas Southern	Receiving		

=== At Incarnate Word ===
Prairie View A&M at Incarnate Word

Team	1	2	3	4	Total
Panthers	0	0	0	9	9
• Cardinals	17	13	10	0	40

- Date: September 11, 2021
- Location: Gayle and Tom Benson Stadium
  San Antonio, TX
- Game start: 7:00 p.m. CDT
- Elapsed time:
- Game attendance: 2,517
- Game weather: 88 °F (31 °C) • Weather: Clear • Wind: E 10 mph
- Referee: Ed Bourgeois
- TV announcers (ESPN+): David Saltzman (play-by-play), Taylor McHargue (analyst)

Scoring summary
1
2
3
4

Statistics	Prairie View A&M	Incarnate Word
First downs		
Total yards		
Rushing yards		
Passing yards		
Turnovers		
Time of possession		

Team	Category	Player	Statistics
Prairie View A&M	Passing		
Prairie View A&M	Rushing		
Prairie View A&M	Receiving		
Incarnate Word	Passing		
Incarnate Word	Rushing		
Incarnate Word	Receiving		

=== Houston Baptist ===
Houston Baptist at Prairie View A&M

Team	1	2	3	4	Total
Huskies	21	3	3	0	27
• Panthers	20	3	7	7	37

- Date: September 18, 2021
- Location: Panther Stadium at Blackshear Field
  Prairie View, TX
- Game start: 6:00 p.m. CDT
- Elapsed time:
- Game attendance:
- Game weather: • Weather: TBD • Wind: TBD
- Referee:
- TV announcers ( ):

Scoring summary
1
2
3
4

Statistics	Houston Baptist	Prairie View A&M
First downs		
Total yards		
Rushing yards		
Passing yards		
Turnovers		
Time of possession		

Team	Category	Player	Statistics
Houston Baptist	Passing		
Houston Baptist	Rushing		
Houston Baptist	Receiving		
Prairie View A&M	Passing		
Prairie View A&M	Rushing		
Prairie View A&M	Receiving		

=== Vs. Grambling State ===
Grambling State vs. Prairie View A&M

Team	1	2	3	4	Total
Tigers	0	7	3	0	10
• Panthers	7	3	7	7	24

- Date: September 25, 2021
- Location: Cotton Bowl
  Dallas, TX
- Game start: 4:00 p.m. CDT
- Elapsed time:
- Game attendance:
- Referee:
- TV announcers ( ):

Scoring summary
1
2
3
4

Statistics	Grambling State	Prairie View A&M
First downs		
Total yards		
Rushing yards		
Passing yards		
Turnovers		
Time of possession		

Team	Category	Player	Statistics
Grambling State	Passing		
Grambling State	Rushing		
Grambling State	Receiving		
Prairie View A&M	Passing		
Prairie View A&M	Rushing		
Prairie View A&M	Receiving		

=== Arkansas–Pine Bluff ===
Arkansas–Pine Bluff at Prairie View A&M

Team	1	2	3	4	Total
Golden Lions	3	6	0	8	17
• Panthers	14	7	6	0	27

- Date: September 30, 2021
- Location: Panther Stadium at Blackshear Field
  Prairie View, TX
- Game start: 6:00 p.m. CDT
- Elapsed time:
- Game attendance:
- Referee:
- TV announcers (ESPNU):

Scoring summary
1
2
3
4

Statistics	Arkansas–Pine Bluff	Prairie View A&M
First downs		
Total yards		
Rushing yards		
Passing yards		
Turnovers		
Time of possession		

Team	Category	Player	Statistics
Arkansas–Pine Bluff	Passing		
Arkansas–Pine Bluff	Rushing		
Arkansas–Pine Bluff	Receiving		
Prairie View A&M	Passing		
Prairie View A&M	Rushing		
Prairie View A&M	Receiving		

=== At Bethune–Cookman ===
Prairie View A&M at Bethune–Cookman

Team	1	2	3	4	Total
• Panthers	7	7	7	14	35
Wildcats	0	8	7	14	29

- Date: October 16, 2021
- Location: Daytona Stadium
  Daytona Beach, FL
- Game start: 3:00 p.m. CDT
- Elapsed time:
- Game attendance:
- Referee:
- TV announcers ( ):

Scoring summary
1
2
3
4

Statistics	Prairie View A&M	Bethune–Cookman
First downs		
Total yards		
Rushing yards		
Passing yards		
Turnovers		
Time of possession		

Team	Category	Player	Statistics
Prairie View A&M	Passing		
Prairie View A&M	Rushing		
Prairie View A&M	Receiving		
Bethune–Cookman	Passing		
Bethune–Cookman	Rushing		
Bethune–Cookman	Receiving		

=== At Southern ===
Prairie View A&M at Southern

Team	1	2	3	4	Total
• Panthers	7	7	17	17	48
Jaguars	0	7	7	7	21

- Date: October 23, 2021
- Location: A. W. Mumford Stadium
  Baton Rouge, LA
- Game start: 6:00 p.m. CDT
- Elapsed time: 3 hours and 17 minutes
- Game attendance: 24,580
- Game weather: 80 °F (27 °C) • Weather: Sunny • Wind: SE 9 MPH
- Referee: Tony Ross
- TV announcers (ESPN3):

Scoring summary
1
2
3
4

Statistics	Prairie View A&M	Southern
First downs		
Total yards		
Rushing yards		
Passing yards		
Turnovers		
Time of possession		

Team	Category	Player	Statistics
Prairie View A&M	Passing		
Prairie View A&M	Rushing		
Prairie View A&M	Receiving		
Southern	Passing		
Southern	Rushing		
Southern	Receiving		

=== Alabama State ===
Alabama State at Prairie View A&M

Team	1	2	3	4	Total
Hornets	10	10	0	0	20
• Panthers	7	3	0	14	24

- Date: November 6, 2021
- Location: Panther Stadium at Blackshear Field
  Prairie View, TX
- Game start: 2:00 p.m. CDT
- Elapsed time:
- Game attendance:
- Referee:
- TV announcers ( ):

Scoring summary
1
2
3
4

Statistics	Alabama State	Prairie View A&M
First downs		
Total yards		
Rushing yards		
Passing yards		
Turnovers		
Time of possession		

Team	Category	Player	Statistics
Alabama State	Passing		
Alabama State	Rushing		
Alabama State	Receiving		
Prairie View A&M	Passing		
Prairie View A&M	Rushing		
Prairie View A&M	Receiving		

=== At Alcorn State ===
Prairie View A&M at Alcorn State

Team	1	2	3	4	Total
No. 24 Panthers	6	3	7	13	29
• Braves	0	24	7	0	31

- Date: November 13, 2021
- Location: Casem-Spinks Stadium
  Lorman, MS
- Game start: 2:00 p.m. CST
- Elapsed time:
- Game attendance:
- Game weather: • Weather: TBD • Wind: TBD
- Referee:
- TV announcers ( ):

Scoring summary
1
2
3
4

Statistics	Prairie View A&M	Alcorn State
First downs		
Total yards		
Rushing yards		
Passing yards		
Turnovers		
Time of possession		

Team	Category	Player	Statistics
Prairie View A&M	Passing		
Prairie View A&M	Rushing		
Prairie View A&M	Receiving		
Alcorn State	Passing		
Alcorn State	Rushing		
Alcorn State	Receiving		

=== At No. 16 (FBS) Texas A&M ===
Prairie View A&M at Texas A&M

Team	1	2	3	4	Total
Panthers	0	0	3	0	3
• No. 16 (FBS) Aggies	21	17	7	7	52

- Date: November 20, 2021
- Location: Kyle Field
  College Station, TX
- Game start: TBD CST
- Elapsed time:
- Game attendance:
- Referee:
- TV announcers (ESPN+/SECN+): Mike Corey, Dave Steckel

Scoring summary
1
2
3
4

Statistics	Prairie View A&M	Texas A&M
First downs		
Total yards		
Rushing yards		
Passing yards		
Turnovers		
Time of possession		

Team	Category	Player	Statistics
Prairie View A&M	Passing		
Prairie View A&M	Rushing		
Prairie View A&M	Receiving		
Texas A&M	Passing		
Texas A&M	Rushing		
Texas A&M	Receiving		

=== Mississippi Valley State ===
Mississippi Valley State at Prairie View A&M

Team	1	2	Total
Delta Devils			0
Panthers			0

- Date: November 27, 2021
- Location: Panther Stadium at Blackshear Field
  Prairie View, TX
- Game start: 2:00 p.m. CST
- Elapsed time:
- Game attendance:
- Game weather: • Weather: TBD • Wind: TBD
- Referee:
- TV announcers (ESPN3):

Scoring summary
1
2
3
4

Statistics	Mississippi Valley State	Prairie View A&M
First downs		
Total yards		
Rushing yards		
Passing yards		
Turnovers		
Time of possession		

Team	Category	Player	Statistics
Mississippi Valley State	Passing		
Mississippi Valley State	Rushing		
Mississippi Valley State	Receiving		
Prairie View A&M	Passing		
Prairie View A&M	Rushing		
Prairie View A&M	Receiving		
