= 2021 Alabama State Hornets football team =

American college football season

2021 Alabama State Hornets football
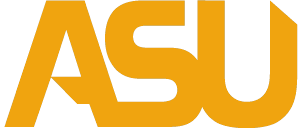
- Conference: Southwestern Athletic Conference
- East Division
- Record: 5–6 (3–5 SWAC)
- Head coach: Donald Hill-Eley (4th season; first 7 games); Travis Pearson (interim, final 4 games)
- Offensive coordinator: Joe Blackwell (3rd season)
- Defensive coordinator: Travis Pearson (2nd season)
- Home stadium: New ASU Stadium

2021 Southwestern Athletic Conference football standings
	Conf.			Overall
Team	W		L	W		L
East Division
No. 22 Jackson State x$	8	–	0	11	–	2
No. 25 Florida A&M ^	7	–	1	9	–	3
Alabama A&M	5	–	3	7	–	3
Mississippi Valley State	3	–	5	4	–	7
Alabama State	3	–	5	5	–	6
Bethune–Cookman	2	–	6	2	–	9
West Division
Prairie View A&M x	6	–	2	7	–	5
Alcorn State	5	–	3	6	–	5
Grambling State	3	–	5	4	–	7
Southern	3	–	5	4	–	7
Texas Southern	2	–	6	2	–	8
Arkansas–Pine Bluff	1	–	7	2	–	9
Championship: Jackson State 27, Prairie View A&M 10
$ – Conference champion; x – Division champion/co-champions; y – Championship game participant; ^ – FCS playoff participant; Rankings from STATS Poll

The 2021 Alabama State Hornets football team represented Alabama State University as a member of the East Division of the Southwestern Athletic Conference (SWAC) during 2021 NCAA Division I FCS football season. The Hornets were led by fourth-year head coach Donald Hill-Eley for the first seven games of the season before he was fired on November 1. The team's defensive coordinator, Travis Pearson, was named interim head coach for the remainder of the season. Alabama State compiled an overall record of 5–6 with a mark of 3–4 in conference play, tying for fourth place in the SWAC East Division. The team played home games at New ASU Stadium in Montgomery, Alabama.

== Schedule ==
Date	Time	Opponent	Site	TV	Result	Attendance
September 4	5:00 p.m.	Miles*	New ASU Stadium; Montgomery, AL		W 14–13 ^{OT}	12,876
September 11	11:00 a.m.	at No. 25 (FBS) Auburn*	Jordan–Hare Stadium; Auburn, AL	SECN	L 0–62	82,745
September 25	5:00 p.m.	Bethune–Cookman	New ASU Stadium; Montgomery, AL	ESPN3	W 38–24	9,450
October 2	5:00 p.m.	at Florida A&M	Bragg Memorial Stadium; Tallahassee, FL	ESPN+	L 0–28	21,087
October 9	2:00 p.m.	Arkansas–Pine Bluff^{†}	New ASU Stadium; Montgomery, AL	Bounce/YouTube	W 35–15	12,341
October 16	2:00 p.m.	at Jackson State	Mississippi Veterans Memorial Stadium; Jackson, MS	ESPN3	L 7–28	53,578
October 30	2:30 p.m.	vs. Alabama A&M	Legion Field; Birmingham, AL (Magic City Classic)	ESPN3	L 28–42	28,096
November 6	2:00 p.m.	at Prairie View A&M	Panther Stadium at Blackshear Field; Prairie View, TX		L 20–24	6,107
November 13	1:00 p.m.	at Mississippi Valley State	Rice–Totten Stadium; Itta Bena, MS	YouTube	L 31–44	2,300
November 20	2:00 p.m.	Texas Southern	New ASU Stadium; Montgomery, AL	ESPN+	W 24–21	4,389
November 25	2:00 p.m.	Tuskegee*	New ASU Stadium; Montgomery, AL (Turkey Day Classic)	ESPN+	W 43–9	0
*Non-conference game; ^{†}Homecoming; Rankings from STATS Poll released prior to the game; All times are in Central time

== Game summaries ==
=== Miles ===
Miles at Alabama State

Team	1	2	3	4	OT	Total
Golden Lions	0	0	0	7	6	13
• Hornets	7	0	0	0	7	14

- Date: September 4, 2021
- Location: New ASU Stadium
  Montgomery, AL
- Game start: 5:00 p.m. CDT
- Elapsed time: 3 hours and 52 minutes
- Game attendance: 12,876
- Game weather: 86 °F (30 °C) • Weather: Clear • Wind: 4 mph
- Referee:
- TV announcers ( ):

Scoring summary
1
2
3
4

Statistics	Miles	Alabama State
First downs		
Total yards		
Rushing yards		
Passing yards		
Turnovers		
Time of possession		

Team	Category	Player	Statistics
Miles	Passing	Octavious Griffin	2/6, 22 yards, 1 TD
Miles	Rushing	Donte Edwards	20 carries, 107 yards
Miles	Receiving	Marcus Lodge	1 reception, 16 yards, 1 TD
Alabama State	Passing	Ryan Nettles	19/29, 186 yards
Alabama State	Rushing	Ezra Gray	10 carries, 67 yards
Alabama State	Receiving	Jeremiah Hixon	8 receptions, 92 yards

=== At Auburn ===
Alabama State at Auburn

Team	1	2	3	4	Total
Hornets	0	0	0	0	0
• No. 25 Tigers	6	14	35	7	62

- Date: September 11, 2021
- Location: Jordan–Hare Stadium
  Auburn, AL
- Game start: 11:00 a.m. CDT
- Elapsed time:
- Game attendance: 82,745
- Game weather: 83 °F (28 °C) • Weather: Sunny • Wind: SE 7 mph
- Referee: Steve Marlowe
- TV announcers (SEC Network): Dave Neal (play-by-play), Deuce McAllister (analyst), Andraya Carter (sideline reporter)

Scoring summary
1
2
3
4

Statistics	Alabama State	Auburn
First downs	11	22
Total yards	58–176	58–538
Rushing yards	29–46	39–364
Passing yards	130	174
Turnovers	19–29–1	11–19–0
Time of possession	32:51	27:09

Team	Category	Player	Statistics
Alabama State	Passing	Ryan Nettles	19/27, 130 yds, 1 INT
Alabama State	Rushing	Jacory Croskey-Merritt	10 carries, 17 yds
Alabama State	Receiving	Jeremiah Hixon	4 receptions, 46 yds
Auburn	Passing	Bo Nix	9/17, 108 yds, 2 TD
Auburn	Rushing	Jarquez Hunter	8 carries, 147 yds, 1 TD
Auburn	Receiving	Demetris Robertson	3 receptions, 61 yds, 2 TD

=== Bethune–Cookman ===
Bethune–Cookman at Alabama State

Team	1	2	Total
Wildcats			0
Hornets			0

- Date: September 25, 2021
- Location: New ASU Stadium
  Montgomery, AL
- Game start: 5:00 p.m. CDT
- Elapsed time:
- Game attendance:
- Game weather: • Weather: TBD • Wind: TBD
- Referee:
- TV announcers (ESPN3):

Scoring summary
1
2
3
4

Statistics	Bethune–Cookman	Alabama State
First downs		
Total yards		
Rushing yards		
Passing yards		
Turnovers		
Time of possession		

Team	Category	Player	Statistics
Bethune–Cookman	Passing		
Bethune–Cookman	Rushing		
Bethune–Cookman	Receiving		
Alabama State	Passing		
Alabama State	Rushing		
Alabama State	Receiving		

=== At Florida A&M ===
Alabama State at Florida A&M

Team	1	2	3	4	Total
Hornets	0	0	0	0	0
• Rattlers	7	14	0	7	28

- Date: October 2, 2021
- Location: Bragg Memorial Stadium
  Tallahassee, FL
- Game start: 5:00 p.m. CDT
- Elapsed time:
- Game attendance:
- Game weather: • Weather: TBD • Wind: TBD
- Referee:
- TV announcers ( ):

Scoring summary
1
2
3
4

Statistics	Alabama State	Florida A&M
First downs		
Total yards		
Rushing yards		
Passing yards		
Turnovers		
Time of possession		

Team	Category	Player	Statistics
Alabama State	Passing		
Alabama State	Rushing		
Alabama State	Receiving		
Florida A&M	Passing		
Florida A&M	Rushing		
Florida A&M	Receiving		

=== Arkansas–Pine Bluff ===
Arkansas–Pine Bluff at Alabama State

Team	1	2	Total
Golden Lions			0
Hornets			0

- Date: October 9, 2021
- Location: New ASU Stadium
  Montgomery, AL
- Game start: 2:00 p.m. CDT
- Elapsed time:
- Game attendance:
- Game weather: • Weather: TBD • Wind: TBD
- Referee:
- TV announcers ( ):

Scoring summary
1
2
3
4

Statistics	Arkansas–Pine Bluff	Alabama State
First downs		
Total yards		
Rushing yards		
Passing yards		
Turnovers		
Time of possession		

Team	Category	Player	Statistics
Arkansas–Pine Bluff	Passing		
Arkansas–Pine Bluff	Rushing		
Arkansas–Pine Bluff	Receiving		
Alabama State	Passing		
Alabama State	Rushing		
Alabama State	Receiving		

=== At Jackson State ===
Alabama State at Jackson State

Team	1	2	Total
Hornets			0
Tigers			0

- Date: October 16, 2021
- Location: Mississippi Veterans Memorial Stadium
  Jackson, MS
- Game start: 2:00 p.m. CDT
- Elapsed time:
- Game attendance:
- Game weather: • Weather: TBD • Wind: TBD
- Referee:
- TV announcers (ESPN3):

Scoring summary
1
2
3
4

Statistics	Alabama State	Jackson State
First downs		
Total yards		
Rushing yards		
Passing yards		
Turnovers		
Time of possession		

Team	Category	Player	Statistics
Alabama State	Passing		
Alabama State	Rushing		
Alabama State	Receiving		
Jackson State	Passing		
Jackson State	Rushing		
Jackson State	Receiving		

=== Vs. Alabama A&M ===
Alabama A&M vs. Alabama State

Team	1	2	Total
Bulldogs			0
Hornets			0

- Date: October 30, 2021
- Location: Legion Field
  Birmingham, AL
- Game start: TBD CDT
- Elapsed time:
- Game attendance:
- Game weather: • Weather: TBD • Wind: TBD
- Referee:
- TV announcers (ESPN3):

Scoring summary
1
2
3
4

Statistics	Alabama A&M	Alabama State
First downs		
Total yards		
Rushing yards		
Passing yards		
Turnovers		
Time of possession		

Team	Category	Player	Statistics
Alabama A&M	Passing		
Alabama A&M	Rushing		
Alabama A&M	Receiving		
Alabama State	Passing		
Alabama State	Rushing		
Alabama State	Receiving		

=== At Prairie View A&M ===
Alabama State at Prairie View A&M

Team	1	2	3	4	Total
Hornets	10	10	0	0	20
• Panthers	7	3	0	14	24

- Date: November 6, 2021
- Location: Panther Stadium at Blackshear Field
  Prairie View, TX
- Game start: 2:00 p.m. CDT
- Elapsed time:
- Game attendance:
- Game weather: • Weather: TBD • Wind: TBD
- Referee:
- TV announcers ( ):

Scoring summary
1
2
3
4

Statistics	Prairie View A&M	Alabama State
First downs		
Total yards		
Rushing yards		
Passing yards		
Turnovers		
Time of possession		

Team	Category	Player	Statistics
Prairie View A&M	Passing		
Prairie View A&M	Rushing		
Prairie View A&M	Receiving		
Alabama State	Passing		
Alabama State	Rushing		
Alabama State	Receiving		

=== At Mississippi Valley State ===
Mississippi Valley State at Alabama State

Team	1	2	Total
Delta Devils			0
Hornets			0

- Date: November 13, 2021
- Location: Rice–Totten Stadium
  Itta Bena, MS
- Game start: 1:00 p.m. CST
- Elapsed time:
- Game attendance:
- Game weather: • Weather: TBD • Wind: TBD
- Referee:
- TV announcers ( ):

Scoring summary
1
2
3
4

Statistics	Alabama State	Mississippi Valley State
First downs		
Total yards		
Rushing yards		
Passing yards		
Turnovers		
Time of possession		

Team	Category	Player	Statistics
Alabama State	Passing		
Alabama State	Rushing		
Alabama State	Receiving		
Mississippi Valley State	Passing		
Mississippi Valley State	Rushing		
Mississippi Valley State	Receiving		

=== Texas Southern ===
Texas Southern at Alabama State

Team	1	2	Total
Tigers			0
Hornets			0

- Date: November 20, 2021
- Location: New ASU Stadium
  Montgomery, AL
- Game start: 2:00 p.m. CDT
- Elapsed time:
- Game attendance:
- Game weather: • Weather: TBD • Wind: TBD
- Referee:
- TV announcers ( ):

Scoring summary
1
2
3
4

Statistics	Texas Southern	Alabama State
First downs		
Total yards		
Rushing yards		
Passing yards		
Turnovers		
Time of possession		

Team	Category	Player	Statistics
Texas Southern	Passing		
Texas Southern	Rushing		
Texas Southern	Receiving		
Alabama State	Passing		
Alabama State	Rushing		
Alabama State	Receiving		

=== Tuskegee ===
Tuskegee at Alabama State

Team	1	2	Total
Golden Tigers			0
Hornets			0

- Date: November 25, 2021
- Location: New ASU Stadium
  Montgomery, AL
- Game start: 2:00 p.m. CST
- Elapsed time:
- Game attendance:
- Game weather: • Weather: TBD • Wind: TBD
- Referee:
- TV announcers ( ):

Scoring summary
1
2
3
4

Statistics	Tuskegee	Alabama State
First downs		
Total yards		
Rushing yards		
Passing yards		
Turnovers		
Time of possession		

Team	Category	Player	Statistics
Tuskegee	Passing		
Tuskegee	Rushing		
Tuskegee	Receiving		
Alabama State	Passing		
Alabama State	Rushing		
Alabama State	Receiving		
