= 2021 Texas Southern Tigers football team =

American college football season

2021 Texas Southern Tigers football
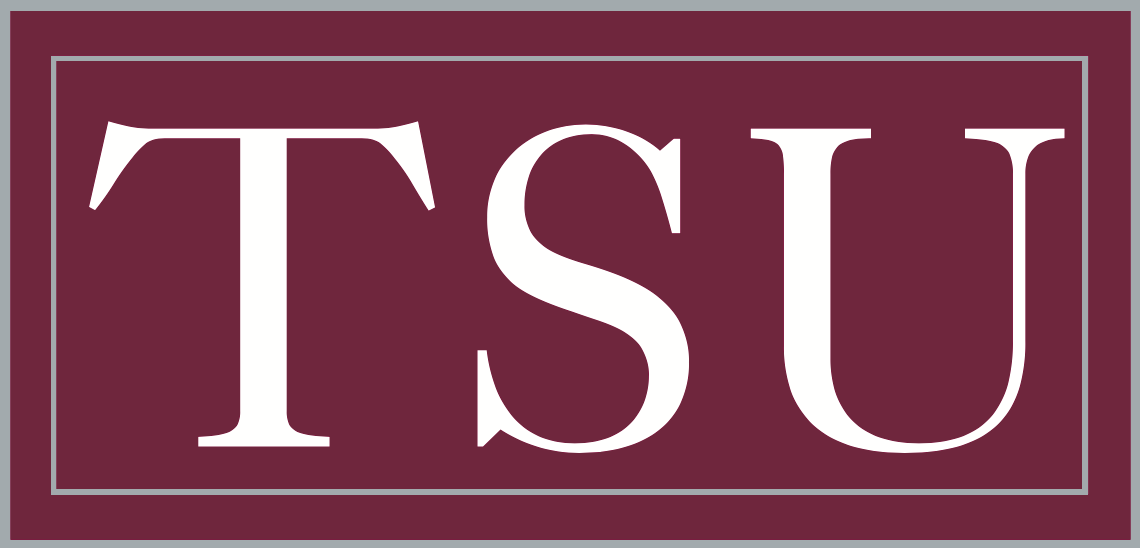
- Conference: Southwestern Athletic Conference
- West Division
- Record: 2–8 (2–6 SWAC)
- Head coach: Clarence McKinney (3rd season)
- Offensive coordinator: David Marsh (3rd season)
- Defensive coordinator: Jeffery Caesar (3rd season)
- Home stadium: BBVA Stadium

2021 Southwestern Athletic Conference football standings
	Conf.			Overall
Team	W		L	W		L
East Division
No. 22 Jackson State x$	8	–	0	11	–	2
No. 25 Florida A&M ^	7	–	1	9	–	3
Alabama A&M	5	–	3	7	–	3
Mississippi Valley State	3	–	5	4	–	7
Alabama State	3	–	5	5	–	6
Bethune–Cookman	2	–	6	2	–	9
West Division
Prairie View A&M x	6	–	2	7	–	5
Alcorn State	5	–	3	6	–	5
Grambling State	3	–	5	4	–	7
Southern	3	–	5	4	–	7
Texas Southern	2	–	6	2	–	8
Arkansas–Pine Bluff	1	–	7	2	–	9
Championship: Jackson State 27, Prairie View A&M 10
$ – Conference champion; x – Division champion/co-champions; y – Championship game participant; ^ – FCS playoff participant; Rankings from STATS Poll

The 2021 Texas Southern Tigers football team represented Texas Southern University a member of the West Division of the Southwestern Athletic Conference (SWAC) during the 2021 NCAA Division I FCS football season. Led third-year head coach Clarence McKinney, the Tigers compiled an overall record of 2–8 with a mark of 2–6 in conference play, placing fifth in the SWAC's West Division. Texas Southern played home games at BBVA Stadium in Houston.

Texas Southern's game against North American on October 2 was considered an exhibition game.

== Schedule ==
Date	Time	Opponent	Site	TV	Result	Attendance
September 4	7:00 p.m.	Prairie View A&M	BBVA Stadium; Houston, TX (Labor Day Classic)	ESPN3	L 17–40	18,297
September 11	6:00 p.m.	at Baylor*	McLane Stadium; Waco, TX	ESPN+	L 7–66	42,461
September 25	5:30 p.m.	at Rice*	Rice Stadium; Houston, TX	ESPN3	L 34–48	18,326
October 2	2:00 p.m.	North American*^{†}	Alexander Durley Sports Complex; Houston, TX	AT&TSN	W 69–0 (exhibition)	6,982
October 9	4:00 p.m.	vs. Southern	Globe Life Park in Arlington; Arlington, TX		W 35–31	15,736
October 16	2:00 p.m.	at Grambling State	Eddie Robinson Stadium; Grambling, LA		L 20–34	9,231
October 23	7:00 p.m.	Alcorn State	PNC Stadium (Note: BBVA Stadium had been renamed to PNC Stadium after BBVA USA's acquisition by PNC Financial Services on October 8, and was fully rebranded by November 5.); Houston, TX	AT&TSN	L 27–44	2,653
October 30	2:00 p.m.	Arkansas–Pine Bluff	PNC Stadium; Houston, TX	AT&TSN / ESPN+	W 59–17	2,712
November 6	1:00 p.m.	at No. 19 Jackson State	Mississippi Veterans Memorial Stadium; Jackson, MS		L 21–41	31,078
November 13	2:00 p.m.	at Alabama A&M	PNC Stadium; Houston, TX	ESPN3	L 49–52	3,177
November 20	2:00 p.m.	Alabama State	New ASU Stadium; Montgomery, AL	ESPN+	L 21–24	4,389
*Non-conference game; ^{†}Homecoming; Rankings from STATS Poll released prior to the game; All times are in Central time

== Game summaries ==
=== Prairie View A&M ===
Prairie View A&M at Texas Southern

Team	1	2	Total
Panthers			0
Tigers			0

- Date: September 4, 2021
- Location: BBVA Stadium
  Houston, TX
- Game start: 7:00 p.m. CDT
- Elapsed time:
- Game attendance:
- Game weather: • Weather: TBD • Wind: TBD
- Referee:
- TV announcers (ESPN3):

Scoring summary
1
2
3
4

Statistics	Prairie View A&M	Texas Southern
First downs		
Total yards		
Rushing yards		
Passing yards		
Turnovers		
Time of possession		

Team	Category	Player	Statistics
Prairie View A&M	Passing		
Prairie View A&M	Rushing		
Prairie View A&M	Receiving		
Texas Southern	Passing		
Texas Southern	Rushing		
Texas Southern	Receiving		

=== At Baylor ===
Texas Southern at Baylor

Team	1	2	3	4	Total
Tigers	0	0	0	7	7
• Bears	21	21	10	14	66

- Date: September 11, 2021
- Location: McLane Stadium
  Waco, TX
- Game start: 6:00 p.m. CDT
- Elapsed time:
- Game attendance:
- Game weather: • Weather: TBD • Wind: TBD
- Referee:
- TV announcers (ESPN+):

Scoring summary
1
2
3
4

Statistics	Texas Southern	Baylor
First downs		
Total yards		
Rushing yards		
Passing yards		
Turnovers		
Time of possession		

Team	Category	Player	Statistics
Texas Southern	Passing		
Texas Southern	Rushing		
Texas Southern	Receiving		
Baylor	Passing		
Baylor	Rushing		
Baylor	Receiving		

=== At Rice ===
Texas Southern at Rice

Team	1	2	Total
Tigers			0
Owls			0

- Date: September 25, 2021
- Location: Rice Stadium
  Houston, TX
- Game start: 5:30 p.m. CDT
- Elapsed time:
- Game attendance:
- Game weather: • Weather: TBD • Wind: TBD
- Referee:
- TV announcers (ESPN3):

Scoring summary
1
2
3
4

Statistics	Texas Southern	Rice
First downs		
Total yards		
Rushing yards		
Passing yards		
Turnovers		
Time of possession		

Team	Category	Player	Statistics
Texas Southern	Passing		
Texas Southern	Rushing		
Texas Southern	Receiving		
Rice	Passing		
Rice	Rushing		
Rice	Receiving		

=== North American ===
North American at Texas Southern

Team	1	2	Total
Stallions			0
Tigers			0

- Date: October 2, 2021
- Location: Alexander Durley Sports Complex
  Houston, TX
- Game start: 2:00 p.m. CDT
- Elapsed time:
- Game attendance:
- Game weather: • Weather: TBD • Wind: TBD
- Referee:
- TV announcers (AT&T SportsNet):

Scoring summary
1
2
3
4

Statistics	North American	Texas Southern
First downs		
Total yards		
Rushing yards		
Passing yards		
Turnovers		
Time of possession		

Team	Category	Player	Statistics
North American	Passing		
North American	Rushing		
North American	Receiving		
Texas Southern	Passing		
Texas Southern	Rushing		
Texas Southern	Receiving		

=== Vs. Southern ===
Southern vs. Texas Southern

Team	1	2	3	4	Total
• Tigers	7	7	14	7	35
Jaguars	7	3	14	7	31

- Date: October 9, 2021
- Location: Globe Life Park
  Arlington, TX
- Game start: 4:00 p.m. CDT
- Elapsed time: 3 hours and 24 minutes
- Game attendance: 15,736
- Game weather: 92 °F (33 °C) • Weather: Sunny • Wind: SE 13 MPH
- Referee: Preston Clipper
- TV announcers ( ):

Scoring summary
1
2
3
4

Statistics	Southern	Texas Southern
First downs		
Total yards		
Rushing yards		
Passing yards		
Turnovers		
Time of possession		

Team	Category	Player	Statistics
Southern	Passing		
Southern	Rushing		
Southern	Receiving		
Texas Southern	Passing		
Texas Southern	Rushing		
Texas Southern	Receiving		

=== At Grambling State ===
Texas Southern at Grambling State

Team	1	2	Total
TXSO Tigers			0
GRAM Tigers			0

- Date: October 16, 2021
- Location: Eddie Robinson Stadium
  Grambling, LA
- Game start: 2:00 p.m. CDT
- Elapsed time:
- Game attendance:
- Game weather: • Weather: TBD • Wind: TBD
- Referee:
- TV announcers ( ):

Scoring summary
1
2
3
4

Statistics	Texas Southern	Grambling State
First downs		
Total yards		
Rushing yards		
Passing yards		
Turnovers		
Time of possession		

Team	Category	Player	Statistics
Texas Southern	Passing		
Texas Southern	Rushing		
Texas Southern	Receiving		
Grambling State	Passing		
Grambling State	Rushing		
Grambling State	Receiving		

=== Alcorn State ===
Alcorn State at Texas Southern

Team	1	2	Total
Braves			0
Tigers			0

- Date: October 23, 2021
- Location: BBVA Stadium
  Houston, TX
- Game start: 7:00 p.m. CDT
- Elapsed time:
- Game attendance:
- Game weather: • Weather: TBD • Wind: TBD
- Referee:
- TV announcers (AT&T SportsNet):

Scoring summary
1
2
3
4

Statistics	Alcorn State	Texas Southern
First downs		
Total yards		
Rushing yards		
Passing yards		
Turnovers		
Time of possession		

Team	Category	Player	Statistics
Alcorn State	Passing		
Alcorn State	Rushing		
Alcorn State	Receiving		
Texas Southern	Passing		
Texas Southern	Rushing		
Texas Southern	Receiving		

=== Arkansas–Pine Bluff ===
Arkansas–Pine Bluff at Texas Southern

Team	1	2	Total
Golden Lions			0
Tigers			0

- Date: October 30, 2021
- Location: BBVA Stadium
  Houston, TX
- Game start: 2:00 p.m. CDT
- Elapsed time:
- Game attendance:
- Game weather: • Weather: TBD • Wind: TBD
- Referee:
- TV announcers (AT&T SportsNet):

Scoring summary
1
2
3
4

Statistics	Arkansas–Pine Bluff	Texas Southern
First downs		
Total yards		
Rushing yards		
Passing yards		
Turnovers		
Time of possession		

Team	Category	Player	Statistics
Arkansas–Pine Bluff	Passing		
Arkansas–Pine Bluff	Rushing		
Arkansas–Pine Bluff	Receiving		
Texas Southern	Passing		
Texas Southern	Rushing		
Texas Southern	Receiving		

=== At No. 19 Jackson State ===
Texas Southern at Jackson State

Team	1	2	Total
TXSO Tigers			0
No. 19 JSU Tigers			0

- Date: November 6, 2021
- Location: Mississippi Veterans Memorial Stadium
  Jackson, MS
- Game start: 1:00 p.m. CDT
- Elapsed time:
- Game attendance:
- Game weather: • Weather: TBD • Wind: TBD
- Referee:
- TV announcers ( ):

Scoring summary
1
2
3
4

Statistics	Texas Southern	Jackson State
First downs		
Total yards		
Rushing yards		
Passing yards		
Turnovers		
Time of possession		

Team	Category	Player	Statistics
Texas Southern	Passing		
Texas Southern	Rushing		
Texas Southern	Receiving		
Jackson State	Passing		
Jackson State	Rushing		
Jackson State	Receiving		

=== Alabama A&M ===
Alabama A&M at Texas Southern

Team	1	2	Total
Bulldogs			0
Tigers			0

- Date: November 13, 2021
- Location: BBVA Stadium
  Houston, TX
- Game start: 2:00 p.m. CST
- Elapsed time:
- Game attendance:
- Game weather: • Weather: TBD • Wind: TBD
- Referee:
- TV announcers (ESPN3):

Scoring summary
1
2
3
4

Statistics	Alabama A&M	Texas Southern
First downs		
Total yards		
Rushing yards		
Passing yards		
Turnovers		
Time of possession		

Team	Category	Player	Statistics
Alabama A&M	Passing		
Alabama A&M	Rushing		
Alabama A&M	Receiving		
Texas Southern	Passing		
Texas Southern	Rushing		
Texas Southern	Receiving		

=== At Alabama State ===
Texas Southern at Alabama State

Team	1	2	Total
Tigers			0
Hornets			0

- Date: November 20, 2021
- Location: New ASU Stadium
  Montgomery, AL
- Game start: 2:00 p.m. CST
- Elapsed time:
- Game attendance:
- Game weather: • Weather: TBD • Wind: TBD
- Referee:
- TV announcers ( ):

Scoring summary
1
2
3
4

Statistics	Texas Southern	Alabama State
First downs		
Total yards		
Rushing yards		
Passing yards		
Turnovers		
Time of possession		

Team	Category	Player	Statistics
Texas Southern	Passing		
Texas Southern	Rushing		
Texas Southern	Receiving		
Alabama State	Passing		
Alabama State	Rushing		
Alabama State	Receiving		
