= 2021 Mississippi Valley State Delta Devils football team =

American college football season

2021 Mississippi Valley State Delta Devils football
- Conference: Southwestern Athletic Conference
- East Division
- Record: 4–7 (3–5 SWAC)
- Head coach: Vincent Dancy (4th season)
- Offensive coordinator: Jared Powers (3rd season)
- Defensive coordinator: Derek Welch (4th season)
- Home stadium: Rice–Totten Stadium

2021 Southwestern Athletic Conference football standings
	Conf.			Overall
Team	W		L	W		L
East Division
No. 22 Jackson State x$	8	–	0	11	–	2
No. 25 Florida A&M ^	7	–	1	9	–	3
Alabama A&M	5	–	3	7	–	3
Mississippi Valley State	3	–	5	4	–	7
Alabama State	3	–	5	5	–	6
Bethune–Cookman	2	–	6	2	–	9
West Division
Prairie View A&M x	6	–	2	7	–	5
Alcorn State	5	–	3	6	–	5
Grambling State	3	–	5	4	–	7
Southern	3	–	5	4	–	7
Texas Southern	2	–	6	2	–	8
Arkansas–Pine Bluff	1	–	7	2	–	9
Championship: Jackson State 27, Prairie View A&M 10
$ – Conference champion; x – Division champion/co-champions; y – Championship game participant; ^ – FCS playoff participant; Rankings from STATS Poll

The 2021 Mississippi Valley State Delta Devils football team represented Mississippi Valley State University as a member of the East Division of the Southwestern Athletic Conference (SWAC) during the 2021 NCAA Division I FCS football season. Led by fourth-year head coach Vincent Dancy, the Delta Devils compiled an overall record of 4–7 and a mark of 3–5 in conference play, tying for fourth place in the SWAC's East Division. Mississippi Valley State played home games at Rice–Totten Stadium in Itta Bena, Mississippi.

== Schedule ==
Date	Time	Opponent	Site	TV	Result	Attendance
September 2	7:00 p.m.	at Murray State*	Roy Stewart Stadium; Murray, KY	ESPN+	L 0–35	6,874
September 18	6:00 p.m.	at Stephen F. Austin*	Homer Bryce Stadium; Nacogdoches, TX	ESPN+	L 13–58	10,035
September 26	2:00 p.m.	vs. Southern	Mississippi Veterans Memorial Stadium; Jackson, MS (Delta-Bayou Classic)	ESPN3	L 25–38	10,502
October 2	3:00 p.m.	North Carolina Central*^{†}	Rice–Totten Stadium; Itta Bena, MS	YouTube	W 17–16	3,000
October 9	4:00 p.m.	at Bethune–Cookman	Daytona Stadium; Daytona Beach, FL	YouTube	W 20–14	10,178
October 16	3:00 p.m.	Alcorn State	Rice–Totten Stadium; Itta Bena, MS	YouTube	L 12–24	9,200
October 23	3:00 p.m.	Florida A&M	Rice–Totten Stadium; Itta Bena, MS	YouTube	L 28–31	2,700
October 30	3:00 p.m.	No. 20 Jackson State	Rice–Totten Stadium; Itta Bena, MS	YouTube	L 19–28	10,000
November 6	1:00 p.m.	at Alabama A&M	Louis Crews Stadium; Normal, AL		L 14–42	5,185
November 13	1:00 p.m.	Alabama State	Rice–Totten Stadium; Itta Bena, MS	YouTube	W 44–31	2,300
November 27	2:00 p.m.	at Prairie View A&M	Panther Stadium at Blackshear Field; Prairie View, TX	ESPN3	W 24–19	724
*Non-conference game; ^{†}Homecoming; Rankings from STATS Poll released prior to the game; All times are in Central time

== Games summaries ==
=== At Murray State ===
Mississippi Valley State at Murray State

Team	1	2	Total
Delta Devils			0
Racers			0

- Date: September 2, 2021
- Location: Roy Stewart Stadium
  Murray, KY
- Game start: 7:00 p.m. CDT
- Elapsed time:
- Game attendance:
- Game weather: • Weather: TBD • Wind: TBD
- Referee:
- TV announcers (ESPN+):

Scoring summary
1
2
3
4

Statistics	Mississippi Valley State	Murray State
First downs		
Total yards		
Rushing yards		
Passing yards		
Turnovers		
Time of possession		

Team	Category	Player	Statistics
Mississippi Valley State	Passing		
Mississippi Valley State	Rushing		
Mississippi Valley State	Receiving		
Murray State	Passing		
Murray State	Rushing		
Murray State	Receiving		

=== At Stephen F. Austin ===
Mississippi Valley State at Stephen F. Austin

Team	1	2	Total
Delta Devils			0
Lumberjacks			0

- Date: September 18, 2021
- Location: Homer Bryce Stadium
  Nacogdoches, TX
- Game start: 6:00 p.m. CDT
- Elapsed time:
- Game attendance:
- Game weather: • Weather: TBD • Wind: TBD
- Referee:
- TV announcers ( ):

Scoring summary
1
2
3
4

Statistics	Mississippi Valley State	Stephen F. Austin
First downs		
Total yards		
Rushing yards		
Passing yards		
Turnovers		
Time of possession		

Team	Category	Player	Statistics
Mississippi Valley State	Passing		
Mississippi Valley State	Rushing		
Mississippi Valley State	Receiving		
Stephen F. Austin	Passing		
Stephen F. Austin	Rushing		
Stephen F. Austin	Receiving		

=== Vs. Southern ===
Southern vs. Mississippi Valley State

Team	1	2	3	4	Total
• Jaguars	3	21	14	0	38
Delta Devils	6	0	13	6	25

- Date: September 26, 2021
- Location: Mississippi Veterans Memorial Stadium
  Jackson, MS
- Game start: 2:00 p.m. CDT
- Elapsed time: 2 hours and 51 minutes
- Game attendance: 10,502
- Game weather: 84 °F (29 °C) • Weather: Sunny • Wind: SE 1 MPH
- Referee: Jarvis Walker
- TV announcers (ESPN+):

Scoring summary
1
2
3
4

Statistics	Southern	Mississippi Valley State
First downs		
Total yards		
Rushing yards		
Passing yards		
Turnovers		
Time of possession		

Team	Category	Player	Statistics
Southern	Passing		
Southern	Rushing		
Southern	Receiving		
Mississippi Valley State	Passing		
Mississippi Valley State	Rushing		
Mississippi Valley State	Receiving		

=== North Carolina Central ===
North Carolina Central at Mississippi Valley State

Team	1	2	Total
Eagles			0
Delta Devils			0

- Date: October 2, 2021
- Location: Rice–Totten Stadium
  Itta Bena, MS
- Game start: 3:00 p.m. CDT
- Elapsed time:
- Game attendance:
- Game weather: • Weather: TBD • Wind: TBD
- Referee:
- TV announcers ( ):

Scoring summary
1
2
3
4

Statistics	North Carolina Central	Mississippi Valley State
First downs		
Total yards		
Rushing yards		
Passing yards		
Turnovers		
Time of possession		

Team	Category	Player	Statistics
North Carolina Central	Passing		
North Carolina Central	Rushing		
North Carolina Central	Receiving		
Mississippi Valley State	Passing		
Mississippi Valley State	Rushing		
Mississippi Valley State	Receiving		

=== At Bethune–Cookman ===
Mississippi Valley State at Bethune–Cookman

Team	1	2	Total
Delta Devils			0
Wildcats			0

- Date: October 9, 2021
- Location: Daytona Stadium
  Daytona Beach, FL
- Game start: 4:00 p.m. CDT
- Elapsed time:
- Game attendance:
- Game weather: • Weather: TBD • Wind: TBD
- Referee:
- TV announcers ( ):

Scoring summary
1
2
3
4

Statistics	Mississippi Valley State	Bethune–Cookman
First downs		
Total yards		
Rushing yards		
Passing yards		
Turnovers		
Time of possession		

Team	Category	Player	Statistics
Mississippi Valley State	Passing		
Mississippi Valley State	Rushing		
Mississippi Valley State	Receiving		
Bethune–Cookman	Passing		
Bethune–Cookman	Rushing		
Bethune–Cookman	Receiving		

=== Alcorn State ===
Alcorn State at Mississippi Valley State

Team	1	2	Total
Braves			0
Delta Devils			0

- Date: October 16, 2021
- Location: Rice–Totten Stadium
  Itta Bena, MS
- Game start: 3:00 p.m. CDT
- Elapsed time:
- Game attendance:
- Game weather: • Weather: TBD • Wind: TBD
- Referee:
- TV announcers ( ):

Scoring summary
1
2
3
4

Statistics	Alcorn State	Mississippi Valley State
First downs		
Total yards		
Rushing yards		
Passing yards		
Turnovers		
Time of possession		

Team	Category	Player	Statistics
Alcorn State	Passing		
Alcorn State	Rushing		
Alcorn State	Receiving		
Mississippi Valley State	Passing		
Mississippi Valley State	Rushing		
Mississippi Valley State	Receiving		

=== Florida A&M ===
Florida A&M at Mississippi Valley State

Team	1	2	Total
Rattlers			0
Delta Devils			0

- Date: October 23, 2021
- Location: Rice–Totten Stadium
  Itta Bena, MS
- Game start: 3:00 p.m. CDT
- Elapsed time:
- Game attendance:
- Game weather: • Weather: TBD • Wind: TBD
- Referee:
- TV announcers ( ):

Scoring summary
1
2
3
4

Statistics	Florida A&M	Mississippi Valley State
First downs		
Total yards		
Rushing yards		
Passing yards		
Turnovers		
Time of possession		

Team	Category	Player	Statistics
Florida A&M	Passing		
Florida A&M	Rushing		
Florida A&M	Receiving		
Mississippi Valley State	Passing		
Mississippi Valley State	Rushing		
Mississippi Valley State	Receiving		

=== No. 20 Jackson State ===
Jackson State at Mississippi Valley State

Team	1	2	Total
No. 20 Tigers			0
Delta Devils			0

- Date: October 30, 2021
- Location: Rice–Totten Stadium
  Itta Bena, MS
- Game start: 3:00 p.m. CDT
- Elapsed time:
- Game attendance:
- Game weather: • Weather: TBD • Wind: TBD
- Referee:
- TV announcers ( ):

Scoring summary
1
2
3
4

Statistics	Jackson State	Mississippi Valley State
First downs		
Total yards		
Rushing yards		
Passing yards		
Turnovers		
Time of possession		

Team	Category	Player	Statistics
Jackson State	Passing		
Jackson State	Rushing		
Jackson State	Receiving		
Mississippi Valley State	Passing		
Mississippi Valley State	Rushing		
Mississippi Valley State	Receiving		

=== At Alabama A&M ===
Mississippi Valley State at Alabama A&M

Team	1	2	Total
Delta Devils			0
Bulldogs			0

- Date: November 6, 2021
- Location: Louis Crews Stadium
  Huntsville, AL
- Game start: 1:00 p.m. CDT
- Elapsed time:
- Game attendance:
- Game weather: • Weather: TBD • Wind: TBD
- Referee:
- TV announcers ( ):

Scoring summary
1
2
3
4

Statistics	Mississippi Valley State	Alabama A&M
First downs		
Total yards		
Rushing yards		
Passing yards		
Turnovers		
Time of possession		

Team	Category	Player	Statistics
Mississippi Valley State	Passing		
Mississippi Valley State	Rushing		
Mississippi Valley State	Receiving		
Alabama A&M	Passing		
Alabama A&M	Rushing		
Alabama A&M	Receiving		

=== Alabama State ===
Alabama State at Mississippi Valley State

Team	1	2	Total
Hornets			0
Delta Devils			0

- Date: November 13, 2021
- Location: Rice–Totten Stadium
  Itta Bena, MS
- Game start: 1:00 p.m. CST
- Elapsed time:
- Game attendance:
- Game weather: • Weather: TBD • Wind: TBD
- Referee:
- TV announcers ( ):

Scoring summary
1
2
3
4

Statistics	Alabama State	Mississippi Valley State
First downs		
Total yards		
Rushing yards		
Passing yards		
Turnovers		
Time of possession		

Team	Category	Player	Statistics
Alabama State	Passing		
Alabama State	Rushing		
Alabama State	Receiving		
Mississippi Valley State	Passing		
Mississippi Valley State	Rushing		
Mississippi Valley State	Receiving		

=== At Prairie View A&M ===
Mississippi Valley State at Prairie View A&M

Team	1	2	Total
Delta Devils			0
Panthers			0

- Date: November 20, 2021
- Location: Panther Stadium at Blackshear Field
  Prairie View, TX
- Game start: 2:00 p.m. CST
- Elapsed time:
- Game attendance:
- Game weather: • Weather: TBD • Wind: TBD
- Referee:
- TV announcers (ESPN3):

Scoring summary
1
2
3
4

Statistics	Mississippi Valley State	Prairie View A&M
First downs		
Total yards		
Rushing yards		
Passing yards		
Turnovers		
Time of possession		

Team	Category	Player	Statistics
Mississippi Valley State	Passing		
Mississippi Valley State	Rushing		
Mississippi Valley State	Receiving		
Prairie View A&M	Passing		
Prairie View A&M	Rushing		
Prairie View A&M	Receiving		
