= 2021 Arkansas–Pine Bluff Golden Lions football team =

American college football season

2021 Arkansas–Pine Bluff Golden Lions football
- Conference: Southwestern Athletic Conference
- West Division
- Record: 2–9 (1–7 SWAC)
- Head coach: Doc Gamble (2nd season)
- Offensive coordinator: Don Treadwell (1st season)
- Defensive coordinator: Jonathan Bradley (3rd season)
- Home stadium: Simmons Bank Field

2021 Southwestern Athletic Conference football standings
	Conf.			Overall
Team	W		L	W		L
East Division
No. 22 Jackson State x$	8	–	0	11	–	2
No. 25 Florida A&M ^	7	–	1	9	–	3
Alabama A&M	5	–	3	7	–	3
Mississippi Valley State	3	–	5	4	–	7
Alabama State	3	–	5	5	–	6
Bethune–Cookman	2	–	6	2	–	9
West Division
Prairie View A&M x	6	–	2	7	–	5
Alcorn State	5	–	3	6	–	5
Grambling State	3	–	5	4	–	7
Southern	3	–	5	4	–	7
Texas Southern	2	–	6	2	–	8
Arkansas–Pine Bluff	1	–	7	2	–	9
Championship: Jackson State 27, Prairie View A&M 10
$ – Conference champion; x – Division champion/co-champions; y – Championship game participant; ^ – FCS playoff participant; Rankings from STATS Poll

The 2021 Arkansas–Pine Bluff Golden Lions football team represented the University of Arkansas at Pine Bluff in the 2021 NCAA Division I FCS football season. The Golden Lions played their home games at Simmons Bank Field in Pine Bluff, Arkansas, and competed in the West Division of the Southwestern Athletic Conference (SWAC). They were led by second-year head coach Doc Gamble.

== Schedule ==
Date	Time	Opponent	Site	TV	Result	Attendance
September 4	6:00 p.m.	Lane*	Simmons Bank Field; Pine Bluff, AR	Golden Lions All-Access	W 34–16	8,749
September 18	6:00 p.m.	at No. 25 Central Arkansas*	Estes Stadium; Conway, AR	ESPN+	L 23–45	11,527
September 23	6:30 p.m.	Alcorn State	Simmons Bank Field; Pine Bluff, AR	ESPNU	L 38–39	7,541
September 30	6:00 p.m.	at Prairie View A&M	Panther Stadium at Blackshear Field; Prairie View, TX	ESPNU	L 17–27	8,467
October 9	2:00 p.m.	at Alabama State	New ASU Stadium; Montgomery, AL	Bounce/YouTube	L 15–35	12,341
October 16	2:00 p.m.	Southern^{†}	Simmons Bank Field; Pine Bluff, AR	ESPN3	L 7–34	0
October 23	11:00 a.m.	at Arkansas*	War Memorial Stadium; Little Rock, AR	SECN	L 3–45	42,576
October 30	2:00 p.m.	at Texas Southern	BBVA Stadium; Houston, TX	AT&TSN	L 17-59	2,712
November 6	2:00 p.m.	Grambling State	Simmons Bank Field; Pine Bluff, AR	ESPN+	W 33-26	6,129
November 13	2:00 p.m.	Florida A&M	Simmons Bank Field; Pine Bluff, AR	ESPN3	L 7-37	3,451
November 20	1:00 p.m.	at Alabama A&M	Louis Crews Stadium; Normal, AL	YouTube	L 24-52	4,311
*Non-conference game; ^{†}Homecoming; Rankings from STATS Poll released prior to the game; All times are in Central time

== Game summaries ==
=== Lane ===
Lane at Arkansas–Pine Bluff

Team	1	2	Total
Dragons			0
Golden Lions			0

- Date: September 4, 2021
- Location: Simmons Bank Field
  Pine Bluff, AR
- Game start: 6:00 p.m. CDT
- Elapsed time:
- Game attendance:
- Game weather: • Weather: TBD • Wind: TBD
- Referee:
- TV announcers ( ):

Scoring summary
1
2
3
4

Statistics	Lane	Arkansas–Pine Bluff
First downs		
Total yards		
Rushing yards		
Passing yards		
Turnovers		
Time of possession		

Team	Category	Player	Statistics
Lane	Passing		
Lane	Rushing		
Lane	Receiving		
Arkansas–Pine Bluff	Passing		
Arkansas–Pine Bluff	Rushing		
Arkansas–Pine Bluff	Receiving		

=== At No. 25 Central Arkansas ===
Arkansas–Pine Bluff at Central Arkansas

Team	1	2	Total
Golden Lions			0
No. 25 Bears			0

- Date: September 18, 2021
- Location: Estes Stadium
  Conway, AR
- Game start: 6:00 p.m. CDT
- Elapsed time:
- Game attendance:
- Game weather: • Weather: TBD • Wind: TBD
- Referee:
- TV announcers ( ):

Scoring summary
1
2
3
4

Statistics	Arkansas–Pine Bluff	Central Arkansas
First downs		
Total yards		
Rushing yards		
Passing yards		
Turnovers		
Time of possession		

Team	Category	Player	Statistics
Arkansas–Pine Bluff	Passing		
Arkansas–Pine Bluff	Rushing		
Arkansas–Pine Bluff	Receiving		
Central Arkansas	Passing		
Central Arkansas	Rushing		
Central Arkansas	Receiving		

=== Alcorn State ===
Alcorn State at Arkansas–Pine Bluff

Team	1	2	Total
Braves			0
Golden Lions			0

- Date: September 23, 2021
- Location: Simmons Bank Field
  Pine Bluff, AR
- Game start: TBD CDT
- Elapsed time:
- Game attendance:
- Game weather: • Weather: TBD • Wind: TBD
- Referee:
- TV announcers (ESPNU):

Scoring summary
1
2
3
4

Statistics	Alcorn State	Arkansas–Pine Bluff
First downs		
Total yards		
Rushing yards		
Passing yards		
Turnovers		
Time of possession		

Team	Category	Player	Statistics
Alcorn State	Passing		
Alcorn State	Rushing		
Alcorn State	Receiving		
Arkansas–Pine Bluff	Passing		
Arkansas–Pine Bluff	Rushing		
Arkansas–Pine Bluff	Receiving		

=== At Prairie View A&M ===
Arkansas–Pine Bluff at Prairie View A&M

Team	1	2	Total
Golden Lions			0
Panthers			0

- Date: September 30, 2021
- Location: Simmons Bank Field
  Pine Bluff, AR
- Game start: 6:00 p.m. CDT
- Elapsed time:
- Game attendance:
- Game weather: • Weather: TBD • Wind: TBD
- Referee:
- TV announcers (ESPNU):

Scoring summary
1
2
3
4

Statistics	Arkansas–Pine Bluff	Prairie View A&M
First downs		
Total yards		
Rushing yards		
Passing yards		
Turnovers		
Time of possession		

Team	Category	Player	Statistics
Arkansas–Pine Bluff	Passing		
Arkansas–Pine Bluff	Rushing		
Arkansas–Pine Bluff	Receiving		
Prairie View A&M	Passing		
Prairie View A&M	Rushing		
Prairie View A&M	Receiving		

=== At Alabama State ===
Arkansas–Pine Bluff at Alabama State

Team	1	2	Total
Golden Lions			0
Hornets			0

- Date: October 9, 2021
- Location: New ASU Stadium
  Montgomery, AL
- Game start: 2:00 p.m. CDT
- Elapsed time:
- Game attendance:
- Game weather: • Weather: TBD • Wind: TBD
- Referee:
- TV announcers ( ):

Scoring summary
1
2
3
4

Statistics	Arkansas–Pine Bluff	Alabama State
First downs		
Total yards		
Rushing yards		
Passing yards		
Turnovers		
Time of possession		

Team	Category	Player	Statistics
Arkansas–Pine Bluff	Passing		
Arkansas–Pine Bluff	Rushing		
Arkansas–Pine Bluff	Receiving		
Alabama State	Passing		
Alabama State	Rushing		
Alabama State	Receiving		

=== Southern ===
Southern at Arkansas–Pine Bluff

Team	1	2	3	4	Total
• Jaguars	7	14	10	3	34
Golden Lions	0	0	0	7	7

- Date: October 16, 2021
- Location: Simmons Bank Field
  Pine Bluff, AR
- Game start: 2:00 p.m. CDT
- Elapsed time:
- Game attendance:
- Game weather: • Weather: TBD • Wind: TBD
- Referee:
- TV announcers (ESPN3):

Scoring summary
1
2
3
4

Statistics	Southern	Arkansas–Pine Bluff
First downs		
Total yards		
Rushing yards		
Passing yards		
Turnovers		
Time of possession		

Team	Category	Player	Statistics
Southern	Passing		
Southern	Rushing		
Southern	Receiving		
Arkansas–Pine Bluff	Passing		
Arkansas–Pine Bluff	Rushing		
Arkansas–Pine Bluff	Receiving		

=== At Arkansas ===
Arkansas–Pine Bluff at Arkansas

Team	1	2	3	4	Total
Golden Lions	0	0	0	3	3
• Razorbacks	17	28	0	0	45

- Date: October 23, 2021
- Location: War Memorial Stadium
  Little Rock, AR
- Game start: 11:00 a.m. CDT
- Elapsed time: 3:03
- Game attendance: 42,576
- Game weather: 72 °F (22 °C) • Weather: Clear • Wind: S 7 mph
- Referee: Matt Loeffler
- TV announcers (SEC Network): Dave Neal (play-by-play), Deuce McAllister (analyst), Andraya Carter (sideline)

Scoring summary
1
2
3
4

Statistics	Arkansas–Pine Bluff	Arkansas
First downs	13	25
Total yards	59–223	63–504
Rushing yards	37–111	41–291
Passing yards	112	213
Turnovers	8–22–2	11–22–0
Time of possession	36:10	23:42

Team	Category	Player	Statistics
Arkansas–Pine Bluff	Passing	Skyler Perry	7/18, 107 yards, 1 INT
Arkansas–Pine Bluff	Rushing	Kierre Crossley	13 carries, 39 yards
Arkansas–Pine Bluff	Receiving	Daemon Dawkins	2 receptions, 49 yards
Arkansas	Passing	KJ Jefferson	10/17, 194 yards, 4 TD
Arkansas	Rushing	Dominique Johnson	6 carries, 91 yards
Arkansas	Receiving	Treylon Burks	4 receptions, 89 yards, 2 TD

=== At Texas Southern ===
Arkansas–Pine Bluff at Texas Southern

Team	1	2	Total
Golden Lions			0
Tigers			0

- Date: October 30, 2021
- Location: BBVA Stadium
  Houston, TX
- Game start: 2:00 p.m. CDT
- Elapsed time:
- Game attendance:
- Game weather: • Weather: TBD • Wind: TBD
- Referee:
- TV announcers (AT&T SportsNet):

Scoring summary
1
2
3
4

Statistics	Arkansas–Pine Bluff	Texas Southern
First downs		
Total yards		
Rushing yards		
Passing yards		
Turnovers		
Time of possession		

Team	Category	Player	Statistics
Arkansas–Pine Bluff	Passing		
Arkansas–Pine Bluff	Rushing		
Arkansas–Pine Bluff	Receiving		
Texas Southern	Passing		
Texas Southern	Rushing		
Texas Southern	Receiving		

=== Grambling State ===
Grambling State at Arkansas–Pine Bluff

Team	1	2	Total
Tigers			0
Golden Lions			0

- Date: November 6, 2021
- Location: Simmons Bank Field
  Pine Bluff, AR
- Game start: 2:00 p.m. CDT
- Elapsed time:
- Game attendance:
- Game weather: • Weather: TBD • Wind: TBD
- Referee:
- TV announcers (ESPN3):

Scoring summary
1
2
3
4

Statistics	Grambling State	Arkansas–Pine Bluff
First downs		
Total yards		
Rushing yards		
Passing yards		
Turnovers		
Time of possession		

Team	Category	Player	Statistics
Grambling State	Passing		
Grambling State	Rushing		
Grambling State	Receiving		
Arkansas–Pine Bluff	Passing		
Arkansas–Pine Bluff	Rushing		
Arkansas–Pine Bluff	Receiving		

=== Florida A&M ===
Florida A&M at Arkansas–Pine Bluff

Team	1	2	Total
Rattlers			0
Golden Lions			0

- Date: November 13, 2021
- Location: Simmons Bank Field
  Pine Bluff, AR
- Game start: 2:00 p.m. CST
- Elapsed time:
- Game attendance:
- Game weather: • Weather: TBD • Wind: TBD
- Referee:
- TV announcers (ESPN3):

Scoring summary
1
2
3
4

Statistics	Florida A&M	Arkansas–Pine Bluff
First downs		
Total yards		
Rushing yards		
Passing yards		
Turnovers		
Time of possession		

Team	Category	Player	Statistics
Florida A&M	Passing		
Florida A&M	Rushing		
Florida A&M	Receiving		
Arkansas–Pine Bluff	Passing		
Arkansas–Pine Bluff	Rushing		
Arkansas–Pine Bluff	Receiving		

=== At Alabama A&M ===
Arkansas–Pine Bluff at Alabama A&M

Team	1	2	Total
Golden Lions			0
Bulldogs			0

- Date: November 20, 2021
- Location: Louis Crews Stadium
  Huntsville, AL
- Game start: 1:00 p.m. CST
- Elapsed time:
- Game attendance:
- Game weather: • Weather: TBD • Wind: TBD
- Referee:
- TV announcers ( ):

Scoring summary
1
2
3
4

Statistics	Arkansas–Pine Bluff	Alabama A&M
First downs		
Total yards		
Rushing yards		
Passing yards		
Turnovers		
Time of possession		

Team	Category	Player	Statistics
Arkansas–Pine Bluff	Passing		
Arkansas–Pine Bluff	Rushing		
Arkansas–Pine Bluff	Receiving		
Alabama A&M	Passing		
Alabama A&M	Rushing		
Alabama A&M	Receiving		
