= 2021 Southern Jaguars football team =

American college football season

2021 Southern Jaguars football
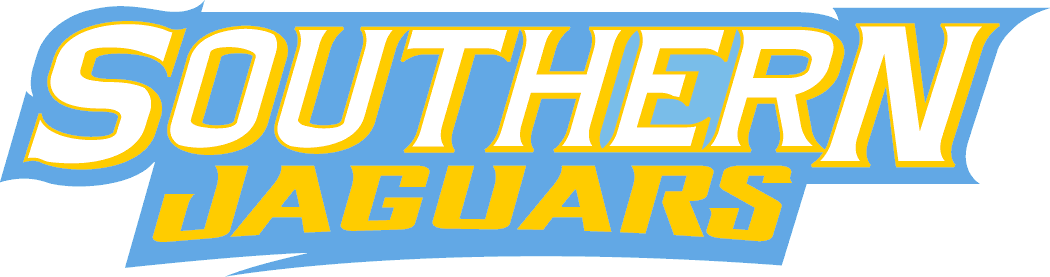
- Conference: Southwestern Athletic Conference
- West Division
- Record: 4–7 (3–5 SWAC)
- Head coach: Jason Rollins (interim; 1st season)
- Offensive coordinator: Zach Grossi (2nd season)
- Defensive coordinator: Lionel Washington (3rd season)
- Home stadium: Ace W. Mumford Stadium

2021 Southwestern Athletic Conference football standings
	Conf.			Overall
Team	W		L	W		L
East Division
No. 22 Jackson State x$	8	–	0	11	–	2
No. 25 Florida A&M ^	7	–	1	9	–	3
Alabama A&M	5	–	3	7	–	3
Mississippi Valley State	3	–	5	4	–	7
Alabama State	3	–	5	5	–	6
Bethune–Cookman	2	–	6	2	–	9
West Division
Prairie View A&M x	6	–	2	7	–	5
Alcorn State	5	–	3	6	–	5
Grambling State	3	–	5	4	–	7
Southern	3	–	5	4	–	7
Texas Southern	2	–	6	2	–	8
Arkansas–Pine Bluff	1	–	7	2	–	9
Championship: Jackson State 27, Prairie View A&M 10
$ – Conference champion; x – Division champion/co-champions; y – Championship game participant; ^ – FCS playoff participant; Rankings from STATS Poll

The 2021 Southern Jaguars football team represented Southern University in the 2021 NCAA Division I FCS football season. The Jaguars played their home games at Ace W. Mumford Stadium in Baton Rouge, Louisiana, and competed in the West Division of the Southwestern Athletic Conference (SWAC). They were led by interim head coach Jason Rollins.

== Schedule ==
Date	Time	Opponent	Site	TV	Result	Attendance
September 4	6:00 p.m.	at Troy*	Veterans Memorial Stadium; Troy, AL	ESPN3	L 3–55	22,399
September 11	6:00 p.m.	Miles*	A. W. Mumford Stadium; Baton Rouge, LA		W 41–24	16,225
September 18	6:00 p.m.	McNeese State*	A. W. Mumford Stadium; Baton Rouge, LA	ESPN+	L 24–31	15,003
September 26	2:00 p.m.	vs. Mississippi Valley State	Mississippi Veterans Memorial Stadium; Jackson, MS	ESPN+	W 38–25	10,502
October 9	4:00 p.m.	vs. Texas Southern	Globe Life Park in Arlington; Arlington, TX		L 31-35	15,736
October 16	2:00 p.m.	at Arkansas–Pine Bluff	Simmons Bank Field; Pine Bluff, AR	ESPN3	W 34-7	0
October 23	6:00 p.m.	Prairie View A&M^{†}	A. W. Mumford Stadium; Baton Rouge, LA	ESPN3	L 21-48	24,580
October 30	6:00 p.m.	Alcorn State	A. W. Mumford Stadium; Baton Rouge, LA	ESPN3	W 38-35	15,333
November 6	6:00 p.m.	Florida A&M	A. W. Mumford Stadium; Baton Rouge, LA	ESPN+	L 17-29	15,665
November 13	6:00 p.m.	No. 18 Jackson State	A. W. Mumford Stadium; Baton Rouge, LA	ESPN3	L 17-21	25,379
November 27	4:00 p.m.	vs. Grambling State	Caesars Superdome; New Orleans, LA (Bayou Classic)	NBCSN	L 26–29	55,791
*Non-conference game; ^{†}Homecoming; Rankings from STATS Poll released prior to the game; All times are in Central time

== Game summaries ==
=== At Troy ===
Southern at Troy

Team	1	2	3	4	Total
Jaguars	0	3	0	0	3
• Trojans	14	20	14	7	55

- Date: September 4, 2021
- Location: Veterans Memorial Stadium
  Troy, AL
- Game start: 6:05 p.m. CDT
- Elapsed time: 3 hours
- Game attendance: 22,399
- Game weather: 93 °F (34 °C) • Weather: Sunny • Wind: N 5 MPH
- Referee: Trennis Livingston
- TV announcers (ESPN3): Will Kollmeyer (play-by-play) and Ben Stanfield (analyst)

Scoring summary
1	09:02	TROY	Taylor Powell 1-yard rush (Brooks Buce kick) (13 plays, 76 yards, 5:58)	TROY 7–0
1	04:52	TROY	Tez Johnson 26-yard pass from Taylor Powell (Brooks Buce kick) (6 plays, 69 yards, 2:03)	TROY 14–0
2	13:49	TROY	Zion Williams 19-yard interception returned (Brooks Buce kick) (3 plays, 2 yards, 0:57)	TROY 21–0
2	07:34	SOU	Martel Fontenot 31-yard field goal (12 plays, 64 yards, 6:15)	TROY 21–3
2	03:08	TROY	Deshon Stoudemire 17-yard pass from Taylor Powell (Brooks Buce kick) (11 plays, 75 yards, 4:26)	TROY 28–3
2	00:44	TROY	Jamontez Woods 1-yard rush (Brooks Buce PAT blocked) (3 plays, 11 yards, 0:49)	TROY 34–3
3	10:59	TROY	Kimani Vidal 37-yard rush (Brooks Buce kick) (4 plays, 58 yards, 1:17)	TROY 41–3
3	02:04	TROY	B. J. Smith 5-yard rush (Brooks Buce kick) (6 plays, 36 yards, 2:51)	TROY 48–3
4	03:02	TROY	Jamontez Woods 1-yard rush (Brooks Buce kick) (15 plays, 86 yards, 10:25)	TROY 55–3

Statistics	Southern	Troy
First downs	11	28
Total yards	189	464
Rushing yards	81	164
Passing yards	108	300
Turnovers	4	1
Time of possession	27:29	32:31

Team	Category	Player	Statistics
Southern	Passing	Ladarius Skelton	7/11, 85 yards, 2 INT's
Southern	Rushing	Devon Benn	11 carries, 50 yards
Southern	Receiving	Tyler Kirkwood	4 receptions, 39 yards
Troy	Passing	Taylor Powell	17/27, 231 yards, 2 TD, 1 INT
Troy	Rushing	Kimani Vidal	15 carries, 81 yards, 1 TD
Troy	Receiving	Tez Johnson	5 receptions, 92 yards, 1 TD

=== Miles ===
Miles at Southern

Team	1	2	3	4	Total
Golden Bears	7	10	7	0	24
• Jaguars	6	7	14	14	41

- Date: September 11, 2021
- Location: A. W. Mumford Stadium
  Baton Rouge, LA
- Game start: 6:00 p.m. CDT
- Elapsed time: 2 hours and 54 minutes
- Game attendance: 16,225
- Game weather: 85 °F (29 °C) • Weather: Sunny • Wind: TBD
- Referee: Bobby Wright
- TV announcers ( ):

Scoring summary
1
2
3
4

Statistics	Miles	Southern
First downs	24	23
Total yards	402	461
Rushing yards	200	323
Passing yards	202	138
Turnovers	1	1
Time of possession	33:31	26:29

Team	Category	Player	Statistics
Miles	Passing	Claude Newell III	15/22, 194 yards, 1 TD
Miles	Rushing	Donte Edwards	16 carries, 67 yards, 1 TD
Miles	Receiving	Montavious Tinch	2 receptions, 39 yards
Southern	Passing	Glendon McDaniel	10/13, 140 yards, 1 TD
Southern	Rushing	Craig Nelson	8 carries, 134 yards, 1 TD
Southern	Receiving	Marquis McClain	2 receptions, 49 yards, 1 TD

=== McNeese State ===
McNeese State at Southern

Team	1	2	3	4	Total
• Cowboys	7	3	10	11	31
Jaguars	14	7	0	3	24

- Date: September 18, 2021
- Location: A. W. Mumford Stadium
  Baton Rouge, LA
- Game start: 6:00 p.m. CDT
- Elapsed time: 3 hours and 9 minutes
- Game attendance: 15,003
- Game weather: 84 °F (29 °C) • Weather: Sunny • Wind: E 6 MPH
- Referee: Y.N. Myers
- TV announcers (ESPN+):

Scoring summary
1
2
3
4

Statistics	McNeese State	Southern
First downs		
Total yards		
Rushing yards		
Passing yards		
Turnovers		
Time of possession		

Team	Category	Player	Statistics
McNeese State	Passing		
McNeese State	Rushing		
McNeese State	Receiving		
Southern	Passing		
Southern	Rushing		
Southern	Receiving		

=== Vs. Mississippi Valley State ===
Mississippi Valley State vs. Southern

Team	1	2	3	4	Total
• Jaguars	3	21	14	0	38
Delta Devils	6	0	13	6	25

- Date: September 26, 2021
- Location: Mississippi Veterans Memorial Stadium
  Jackson, MS
- Game start: 2:00 p.m. CDT
- Elapsed time: 2 hours and 51 minutes
- Game attendance: 10,502
- Game weather: 84 °F (29 °C) • Weather: Sunny • Wind: SE 1 MPH
- Referee: Jarvis Walker
- TV announcers (ESPN+):

Scoring summary
1
2
3
4

Statistics	Mississippi Valley State	Southern
First downs		
Total yards		
Rushing yards		
Passing yards		
Turnovers		
Time of possession		

Team	Category	Player	Statistics
Mississippi Valley State	Passing		
Mississippi Valley State	Rushing		
Mississippi Valley State	Receiving		
Southern	Passing		
Southern	Rushing		
Southern	Receiving		

=== Vs. Texas Southern ===
Texas Southern vs. Southern

Team	1	2	3	4	Total
• Tigers	7	7	14	7	35
Jaguars	7	3	14	7	31

- Date: October 9, 2021
- Location: Globe Life Park
  Arlington, TX
- Game start: 4:00 p.m. CDT
- Elapsed time: 3 hours and 24 minutes
- Game attendance: 15,736
- Game weather: 92 °F (33 °C) • Weather: Sunny • Wind: SE 13 MPH
- Referee: Preston Clipper
- TV announcers ( ):

Scoring summary
1
2
3
4

Statistics	Texas Southern	Southern
First downs		
Total yards		
Rushing yards		
Passing yards		
Turnovers		
Time of possession		

Team	Category	Player	Statistics
Texas Southern	Passing		
Texas Southern	Rushing		
Texas Southern	Receiving		
Southern	Passing		
Southern	Rushing		
Southern	Receiving		

=== At Arkansas–Pine Bluff ===
Southern at Arkansas–Pine Bluff

Team	1	2	3	4	Total
• Jaguars	7	14	10	3	34
Golden Lions	0	0	0	7	7

- Date: October 16, 2021
- Location: Simmons Bank Field
  Pine Bluff, AR
- Game start: 2:00 p.m. CDT
- Elapsed time:
- Game attendance:
- Game weather: • Weather: TBD • Wind: TBD
- Referee:
- TV announcers (ESPN3):

Scoring summary
1
2
3
4

Statistics	Southern	Arkansas–Pine Bluff
First downs		
Total yards		
Rushing yards		
Passing yards		
Turnovers		
Time of possession		

Team	Category	Player	Statistics
Southern	Passing		
Southern	Rushing		
Southern	Receiving		
Arkansas–Pine Bluff	Passing		
Arkansas–Pine Bluff	Rushing		
Arkansas–Pine Bluff	Receiving		

=== Prairie View A&M ===
Prairie View A&M at Southern

Team	1	2	3	4	Total
• Panthers	7	7	17	17	48
Jaguars	0	7	7	7	21

- Date: October 23, 2021
- Location: A. W. Mumford Stadium
  Baton Rouge, LA
- Game start: 6:00 p.m. CDT
- Elapsed time: 3 hours and 17 minutes
- Game attendance: 24,580
- Game weather: 80 °F (27 °C) • Weather: Sunny • Wind: SE 9 MPH
- Referee: Tony Ross
- TV announcers (ESPN3):

Scoring summary
1
2
3
4

Statistics	Prairie View A&M	Southern
First downs		
Total yards		
Rushing yards		
Passing yards		
Turnovers		
Time of possession		

Team	Category	Player	Statistics
Prairie View A&M	Passing		
Prairie View A&M	Rushing		
Prairie View A&M	Receiving		
Southern	Passing		
Southern	Rushing		
Southern	Receiving		

=== Alcorn State ===
Alcorn State at Southern

Team	1	2	3	4	Total
Braves	0	14	7	14	35
• Jaguars	7	7	7	17	38

- Date: October 30, 2021
- Location: A. W. Mumford Stadium
  Baton Rouge, LA
- Game start: 6:00 p.m. CDT
- Elapsed time: 3 hours and 28 minutes
- Game attendance: 15,333
- Game weather: • Weather: Sunny • Wind: TBD
- Referee: Bobby White
- TV announcers (ESPN3):

Scoring summary
1
2
3
4

Statistics	Alcorn State	Southern
First downs		
Total yards		
Rushing yards		
Passing yards		
Turnovers		
Time of possession		

Team	Category	Player	Statistics
Alcorn State	Passing		
Alcorn State	Rushing		
Alcorn State	Receiving		
Southern	Passing		
Southern	Rushing		
Southern	Receiving		

=== Florida A&M ===
Florida A&M at Southern

Team	1	2	3	4	Total
• Rattlers	7	13	3	6	29
Jaguars	14	3	0	0	17

- Date: November 6, 2021
- Location: A. W. Mumford Stadium
  Baton Rouge, LA
- Game start: 6:00 p.m. CDT
- Elapsed time: 3 hours and 12 minutes
- Game attendance: 15,665
- Game weather: • Weather: Sunny • Wind: TBD
- Referee: Y.N. Miles
- TV announcers (ESPN+):

Scoring summary
1
2
3
4

Statistics	Florida A&M	Southern
First downs		
Total yards		
Rushing yards		
Passing yards		
Turnovers		
Time of possession		

Team	Category	Player	Statistics
Florida A&M	Passing		
Florida A&M	Rushing		
Florida A&M	Receiving		
Southern	Passing		
Southern	Rushing		
Southern	Receiving		

=== No. 18 Jackson State ===
Jackson State at Southern

Team	1	2	3	4	Total
• No. 18 Tigers	0	7	0	14	21
Jaguars	7	7	3	0	17

- Date: November 13, 2021
- Location: A. W. Mumford Stadium
  Baton Rouge, LA
- Game start: 6:00 p.m. CST
- Elapsed time: 3 hours and 7 minutes
- Game attendance: 25,379
- Game weather: • Weather: Sunny • Wind: TBD
- Referee: Bobby Wright
- TV announcers (ESPN3):

Scoring summary
1
2
3
4

Statistics	Jackson State	Southern
First downs		
Total yards		
Rushing yards		
Passing yards		
Turnovers		
Time of possession		

Team	Category	Player	Statistics
Jackson State	Passing		
Jackson State	Rushing		
Jackson State	Receiving		
Southern	Passing		
Southern	Rushing		
Southern	Receiving		

=== Vs. Grambling State ===
Grambling State vs. Southern

Team	1	2	3	4	Total
• Tigers	7	9	3	10	29
Jaguars	10	3	0	13	26

- Date: November 27, 2021
- Location: Caesars Superdome
  New Orleans, LA
- Game start: 4:00 p.m. CST
- Elapsed time: 3 hours and 40 minutes
- Game attendance: 55,791
- Game weather: 61 °F (16 °C) • Weather: Mostly Sunny • Wind: SW 4 MPH
- Referee:
- TV announcers (NBC Sports Network):

Scoring summary
1
2
3
4

Statistics	Grambling State	Southern
First downs		
Total yards		
Rushing yards		
Passing yards		
Turnovers		
Time of possession		

Team	Category	Player	Statistics
Grambling State	Passing		
Grambling State	Rushing		
Grambling State	Receiving		
Southern	Passing		
Southern	Rushing		
Southern	Receiving		
