= 2021 Alabama A&M Bulldogs football team =

American college football season

2021 Alabama A&M Bulldogs football
- Conference: Southwestern Athletic Conference
- East Division
- Record: 7–3 (5–3 SWAC)
- Head coach: Connell Maynor (4th season)
- Offensive coordinator: Duane Taylor (4th season)
- Defensive coordinator: Granville Eastman (3rd season)
- Home stadium: Louis Crews Stadium

2021 Southwestern Athletic Conference football standings
	Conf.			Overall
Team	W		L	W		L
East Division
No. 22 Jackson State x$	8	–	0	11	–	2
No. 25 Florida A&M ^	7	–	1	9	–	3
Alabama A&M	5	–	3	7	–	3
Mississippi Valley State	3	–	5	4	–	7
Alabama State	3	–	5	5	–	6
Bethune–Cookman	2	–	6	2	–	9
West Division
Prairie View A&M x	6	–	2	7	–	5
Alcorn State	5	–	3	6	–	5
Grambling State	3	–	5	4	–	7
Southern	3	–	5	4	–	7
Texas Southern	2	–	6	2	–	8
Arkansas–Pine Bluff	1	–	7	2	–	9
Championship: Jackson State 27, Prairie View A&M 10
$ – Conference champion; x – Division champion/co-champions; y – Championship game participant; ^ – FCS playoff participant; Rankings from STATS Poll

The 2021 Alabama A&M Bulldogs football team represented Alabama A&M University as a member of the East Division of the Southwestern Athletic Conference (SWAC) during the 2021 NCAA Division I FCS football season. Led by fourth-year head coach Connell Maynor, the Bulldogs compiled an overall record of 7–3 with a mark of 5–3 in conference play placing third in the SWAC's East Division. The team played its home games at Louis Crews Stadium in Huntsville, Alabama.

== Schedule ==
Date	Time	Opponent	Site	TV	Result	Attendance
September 4	6:00 p.m.	South Carolina State*	Louis Crews Stadium; Huntsville, AL	YouTube	W 42–41	11,500
September 16	6:30 p.m.	at Bethune–Cookman	Daytona Stadium; Daytona Beach, FL	ESPNU	W 30–27	4,173
September 25	4:00 p.m.	vs. Tuskegee*	Ladd-Peebles Stadium; Mobile, AL (Gulf Coast Challenge)		W 45–35	12,500
October 2	2:00 p.m.	at Grambling State	Eddie Robinson Stadium; Grambling, LA	ESPN3	L 28–37	6,714
October 9	2:00 p.m.	Jackson State^{†}	Louis Crews Stadium; Huntsville, AL	ESPN3	L 15–61	21,835
October 16	1:00 p.m.	Florida A&M	Louis Crews Stadium; Huntsville, AL	ESPN3	L 31–35	8,375
October 30	2:30 p.m.	vs. Alabama State	Legion Field; Birmingham, AL (Magic City Classic)	ESPN3	W 42–28	28,096
November 6	1:00 p.m.	Mississippi Valley State	Louis Crews Stadium; Huntsville, AL		W 42–14	5,185
November 13	2:00 p.m.	at Texas Southern	BBVA Stadium; Houston, TX	ESPN3	W 52–49	3,177
November 20	1:00 p.m.	Arkansas–Pine Bluff	Louis Crews Stadium; Huntsville, AL	YouTube	W 52–24	4,311
*Non-conference game; ^{†}Homecoming; All times are in Central time

== Game summaries ==
=== South Carolina State ===
South Carolina State at Alabama A&M

Team	1	2	3	4	Total
SCSU Bulldogs	7	17	14	3	41
• AAMU Bulldogs	14	7	14	7	42

- Date: September 4, 2021
- Location: Louis Crews Stadium
  Huntsville, AL
- Game start: 6:00 p.m. CDT
- Elapsed time: 3 hours and 51 minutes
- Game attendance: 11,500
- Game weather: 85 °F (29 °C) • Weather: Cloudy • Wind: 6 mph
- Referee:
- TV announcers ( ):

Scoring summary
1
2
3
4

Statistics	South Carolina State	Alabama A&M
First downs	15	28
Total yards	455	569
Rushing yards	242	143
Passing yards	213	426
Turnovers	2	3
Time of possession	29:54	30:06

Team	Category	Player	Statistics
South Carolina State	Passing	Corey Fields Jr.	14/28, 213 yards, 1 TD, 2 INT's
South Carolina State	Rushing	Corey Fields Jr.	9 carries, 89 yards, 1 TD
South Carolina State	Receiving	Shaquan Davis	5 receptions, 140 yards, 1 TD
Alabama A&M	Passing	Aqeel Glass	28/49, 426 yards, 4 TD
Alabama A&M	Rushing	Gary Quarles	22 carries, 129 yards, 1 TD
Alabama A&M	Receiving	Brian Jenkins Jr.	5 receptions, 116 yards, 1 TD

=== At Bethune–Cookman ===
Alabama A&M at Bethune–Cookman

Team	1	2	Total
Bulldogs			0
Wildcats			0

- Date: September 16, 2021
- Location: Daytona Stadium
  Daytona Beach, FL
- Game start: TBD CDT
- Elapsed time:
- Game attendance:
- Game weather: • Weather: TBD • Wind: TBD
- Referee:
- TV announcers ( ):

Scoring summary
1
2
3
4

Statistics	Alabama A&M	Bethune–Cookman
First downs		
Total yards		
Rushing yards		
Passing yards		
Turnovers		
Time of possession		

Team	Category	Player	Statistics
Alabama A&M	Passing		
Alabama A&M	Rushing		
Alabama A&M	Receiving		
Bethune–Cookman	Passing		
Bethune–Cookman	Rushing		
Bethune–Cookman	Receiving		

=== Vs. Tuskegee ===
Tuskegee vs. Alabama A&M

Team	1	2	Total
Golden Tigers			0
Bulldogs			0

- Date: September 25, 2021
- Location: Ladd–Peebles Stadium
  Mobile, AL
- Game start: TBD CDT
- Elapsed time:
- Game attendance:
- Game weather: • Weather: TBD • Wind: TBD
- Referee:
- TV announcers ( ):

Scoring summary
1
2
3
4

Statistics	Tuskegee	Alabama A&M
First downs		
Total yards		
Rushing yards		
Passing yards		
Turnovers		
Time of possession		

Team	Category	Player	Statistics
Tuskegee	Passing		
Tuskegee	Rushing		
Tuskegee	Receiving		
Alabama A&M	Passing		
Alabama A&M	Rushing		
Alabama A&M	Receiving		

=== At Grambling State ===
Alabama A&M at Grambling State

Team	1	2	Total
Bulldogs			0
Tigers			0

- Date: October 2, 2021
- Location: Eddie Robinson Stadium
  Grambling, LA
- Game start: 2:00 p.m. CDT
- Elapsed time:
- Game attendance:
- Game weather: • Weather: TBD • Wind: TBD
- Referee:
- TV announcers (ESPN3):

Scoring summary
1
2
3
4

Statistics	Alabama A&M	Grambling State
First downs		
Total yards		
Rushing yards		
Passing yards		
Turnovers		
Time of possession		

Team	Category	Player	Statistics
Alabama A&M	Passing		
Alabama A&M	Rushing		
Alabama A&M	Receiving		
Grambling State	Passing		
Grambling State	Rushing		
Grambling State	Receiving		

=== Jackson State ===
Jackson State at Alabama A&M

Team	1	2	Total
Tigers			0
Bulldogs			0

- Date: October 9, 2021
- Location: Louis Crews Stadium
  Huntsville, AL
- Game start: 2:00 p.m. CDT
- Elapsed time:
- Game attendance:
- Game weather: • Weather: TBD • Wind: TBD
- Referee:
- TV announcers (ESPN3):

Scoring summary
1
2
3
4

Statistics	Jackson State	Alabama A&M
First downs		
Total yards		
Rushing yards		
Passing yards		
Turnovers		
Time of possession		

Team	Category	Player	Statistics
Jackson State	Passing		
Jackson State	Rushing		
Jackson State	Receiving		
Alabama A&M	Passing		
Alabama A&M	Rushing		
Alabama A&M	Receiving		

=== Florida A&M ===
Florida A&M at Alabama A&M

Team	1	2	Total
Rattlers			0
Bulldogs			0

- Date: October 16, 2021
- Location: Louis Crews Stadium
  Huntsville, AL
- Game start: 1:00 p.m. CDT
- Elapsed time:
- Game attendance:
- Game weather: • Weather: TBD • Wind: TBD
- Referee:
- TV announcers (ESPN3):

Scoring summary
1
2
3
4

Statistics	Florida A&M	Alabama A&M
First downs		
Total yards		
Rushing yards		
Passing yards		
Turnovers		
Time of possession		

Team	Category	Player	Statistics
Florida A&M	Passing		
Florida A&M	Rushing		
Florida A&M	Receiving		
Alabama A&M	Passing		
Alabama A&M	Rushing		
Alabama A&M	Receiving		

=== Vs. Alabama State ===
Alabama State vs. Alabama A&M

Team	1	2	Total
Hornets			0
Bulldogs			0

- Date: October 30, 2021
- Location: Legion Field
  Birmingham, AL
- Game start: TBD CDT
- Elapsed time:
- Game attendance:
- Game weather: • Weather: TBD • Wind: TBD
- Referee:
- TV announcers (ESPN3):

Scoring summary
1
2
3
4

Statistics	Alabama State	Alabama A&M
First downs		
Total yards		
Rushing yards		
Passing yards		
Turnovers		
Time of possession		

Team	Category	Player	Statistics
Alabama State	Passing		
Alabama State	Rushing		
Alabama State	Receiving		
Alabama A&M	Passing		
Alabama A&M	Rushing		
Alabama A&M	Receiving		

=== Mississippi Valley State ===
Mississippi Valley State at Alabama A&M

Team	1	2	Total
Delta Devils			0
Bulldogs			0

- Date: November 6, 2021
- Location: Louis Crews Stadium
  Huntsville, AL
- Game start: 1:00 p.m. CDT
- Elapsed time:
- Game attendance:
- Game weather: • Weather: TBD • Wind: TBD
- Referee:
- TV announcers ( ):

Scoring summary
1
2
3
4

Statistics	Mississippi Valley State	Alabama A&M
First downs		
Total yards		
Rushing yards		
Passing yards		
Turnovers		
Time of possession		

Team	Category	Player	Statistics
Mississippi Valley State	Passing		
Mississippi Valley State	Rushing		
Mississippi Valley State	Receiving		
Alabama A&M	Passing		
Alabama A&M	Rushing		
Alabama A&M	Receiving		

=== At Texas Southern ===
Alabama A&M at Texas Southern

Team	1	2	Total
Bulldogs			0
Tigers			0

- Date: November 13, 2021
- Location: BBVA Stadium
  Houston, TX
- Game start: 2:00 p.m. CDT
- Elapsed time:
- Game attendance:
- Game weather: • Weather: TBD • Wind: TBD
- Referee:
- TV announcers (ESPN3):

Scoring summary
1
2
3
4

Statistics	Alabama A&M	Texas Southern
First downs		
Total yards		
Rushing yards		
Passing yards		
Turnovers		
Time of possession		

Team	Category	Player	Statistics
Alabama A&M	Passing		
Alabama A&M	Rushing		
Alabama A&M	Receiving		
Texas Southern	Passing		
Texas Southern	Rushing		
Texas Southern	Receiving		

=== Arkansas–Pine Bluff ===
Arkansas–Pine Bluff at Alabama A&M

Team	1	2	Total
Golden Lions			0
Bulldogs			0

- Date: November 20, 2021
- Location: Louis Crews Stadium
  Huntsville, AL
- Game start: 1:00 p.m. CDT
- Elapsed time:
- Game attendance:
- Game weather: • Weather: TBD • Wind: TBD
- Referee:
- TV announcers ( ):

Scoring summary
1
2
3
4

Statistics	Arkansas–Pine Bluff	Alabama A&M
First downs		
Total yards		
Rushing yards		
Passing yards		
Turnovers		
Time of possession		

Team	Category	Player	Statistics
Arkansas–Pine Bluff	Passing		
Arkansas–Pine Bluff	Rushing		
Arkansas–Pine Bluff	Receiving		
Alabama A&M	Passing		
Alabama A&M	Rushing		
Alabama A&M	Receiving		
