= The Ted =

The Ted may refer to

- Ted Constant Convocation Center, now Chartway Arena, an arena complex in Norfolk, Virginia.
- Turner Field, a former ballpark in Atlanta, Georgia that was named after Ted Turner.
