= Corky Kell Classic =

Corky Kell + Dave Hunter Classic
- Corky Kell + Dave Hunter Classic
- Stadium: Mercedes-Benz Stadium (Present)
- Location: Atlanta, Georgia (1992–1994, 1996, 1998–Present)
- Previous stadiums: Walter H. Cantrell Stadium (1995, 1997, 2014), Georgia Dome (1992–1994, 1996, 1998–2016), Georgia State Stadium (2017-18)
- Previous locations: Powder Springs, Georgia (1995, 1997, 2014)
- Operated: 1992-Present

Sponsors
- Georgia Construction Careers IBEW 613

The Corky Kell + Dave Hunter Classic is an annual series of high school football games played in Georgia at the beginning of each Georgia High School Association football season, featuring many of the state's top teams. The 2025 Classic will consist of eleven games: four of which were played at Mercedes Benz Stadium in Atlanta; two at Rome's Barron Stadium; two at Kell High School; two at West Forsyth High School; and one at William "Buck" Godfrey Stadium. The teams play to help raise money for the Corky Kell Scholarship Fund.

== History ==
In 1992, former Wheeler head football coach Corky Kell helped create the High School Football Classic in the then-newly built Georgia Dome. From 1992 to 2016 (with a few years of alternating locations), games were played in Georgia Dome in Atlanta. The games were played in the Dome every year except in 1995, 1997, and 2014 when they were played at McEachern High School.

Prior to 2014 there were five games played on the first Saturday of the season starting at 9:00 am and closing with an 8:30 pm game. The 2014 season was the first to host seven games over two days.

In 2017 with the closing of the Georgia Dome, the series was moved to the newly converted and opened Georgia State Stadium (formerly Turner Field). The 2017 series was the first event held in the stadium after the conversion from the baseball Turner Field to the football Georgia State Stadium.

The Classic moved to Mercedes-Benz Stadium in 2018, and has hosted the event's finale there ever since. In 2023, the Corky Kell Classic was renamed to the "Corky Kell + Dave Hunter Classic" to honor long-time Brookwood High School football coach and Corky Kell Executive Director Dave Hunter.

The Classic has featured both McEachern High School and Brookwood High School every year. It has included other teams such as Southwest DeKalb High School, Kell High School, Chattahoochee High School, and many other of the state's top high school football programs.
