= Atlanta Postal Credit Union =

Credit union based in Atlanta, Georgia, US

Atlanta Postal Credit Union (APCU) is a credit union based in Atlanta, Georgia, that was founded in 1925. It is Georgia's oldest credit union, and was originally established to serve postal carriers of the state.

APCU is the fourth largest credit union in Georgia with over 113,000 members and assets of 2.12 billion as of March 2018. They operate 6 branch locations in Georgia.

In 2020, APCU launched a new division known as Center Parc Credit Union, as part of a renewed effort to target the consumer market. APCU president and CEO Chuck Head believed that potential members were being alienated by the organization's heritage as a postal credit union, and that this had led to a slowdown in new membership. The Center Parc name is derived from the word "parcel", as an homage to its history. The first Center Parc branch was opened near Centennial Olympic Park in Atlanta, and the brand also acquired the naming rights to nearby Georgia State Stadium (the former Centennial Olympic Stadium), renaming it Center Parc Stadium.
