= 2021 Alcorn State Braves football team =

American college football season

2021 Alcorn State Braves football
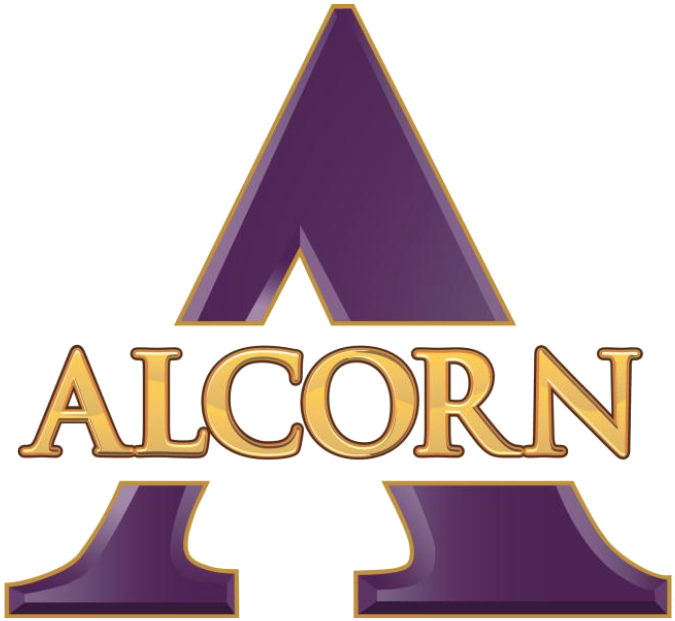
- Conference: Southwestern Athletic Conference
- West Division
- Record: 6–5 (5–3 SWAC)
- Head coach: Fred McNair (5th season)
- Offensive coordinator: Elliott Wratten (2nd season)
- Offensive scheme: Spread option
- Defensive coordinator: Cedric Thornton (3rd season)
- Base defense: Multiple 4–2–5
- Home stadium: Casem-Spinks Stadium

2021 Southwestern Athletic Conference football standings
	Conf.			Overall
Team	W		L	W		L
East Division
No. 22 Jackson State x$	8	–	0	11	–	2
No. 25 Florida A&M ^	7	–	1	9	–	3
Alabama A&M	5	–	3	7	–	3
Mississippi Valley State	3	–	5	4	–	7
Alabama State	3	–	5	5	–	6
Bethune–Cookman	2	–	6	2	–	9
West Division
Prairie View A&M x	6	–	2	7	–	5
Alcorn State	5	–	3	6	–	5
Grambling State	3	–	5	4	–	7
Southern	3	–	5	4	–	7
Texas Southern	2	–	6	2	–	8
Arkansas–Pine Bluff	1	–	7	2	–	9
Championship: Jackson State 27, Prairie View A&M 10
$ – Conference champion; x – Division champion/co-champions; y – Championship game participant; ^ – FCS playoff participant; Rankings from STATS Poll

The 2021 Alcorn State Braves football team represented Alcorn State University in the 2021 NCAA Division I FCS football season. The Braves played their home games at Casem-Spinks Stadium in Lorman, Mississippi, and competed in the West Division of the Southwestern Athletic Conference (SWAC). They were led by fifth-year head coach Fred McNair.

== Schedule ==
Date	Time	Opponent	Site	TV	Result	Attendance
August 28	6:00 p.m.	vs. North Carolina Central*	Center Parc Stadium; Atlanta, GA (MEAC/SWAC Challenge/College GameDay)	ESPN	L 14–23	15,215
September 11	6:00 p.m.	Northwestern State*	Casem-Spinks Stadium; Lorman, MS		W 13–10	0
September 18	7:00 p.m.	at South Alabama*	Hancock Whitney Stadium; Mobile, AL	ESPN3	L 21–28	15,204
September 23	6:30 p.m.	at Arkansas–Pine Bluff	Simmons Bank Field; Pine Bluff, AR	ESPNU	W 39–38	7,541
October 9	2:00 p.m.	Grambling State^{†}	Casem-Spinks Stadium; Lorman, MS	ESPN3	W 24-20	14,500
October 16	3:00 p.m.	at Mississippi Valley State	Rice–Totten Stadium; Itta Bena, MS	YouTube	W 24-12	9,200
October 23	7:00 p.m.	at Texas Southern	BBVA Stadium; Houston, TX	AT&TSN	W 44-27	2,653
October 30	6:00 p.m.	at Southern	A. W. Mumford Stadium; Baton Rouge, LA	ESPN3	L 35-38	15,333
November 6	11:00 a.m.	at Bethune–Cookman	Daytona Stadium; Daytona Beach, FL	ESPN+	L 31-35	3,673
November 13	2:00 p.m.	No. 24 Prairie View A&M	Casem-Spinks Stadium; Lorman, MS		W 31-29	0
November 20	1:00 p.m.	at No. 19 Jackson State	Mississippi Veterans Memorial Stadium; Jackson, MS (Soul Bowl)	ESPN3	L 10-24	58,892
*Non-conference game; ^{†}Homecoming; Rankings from STATS Poll released prior to the game; All times are in Central time

== Game summaries ==
=== Vs. North Carolina Central ===
Alcorn State vs. North Carolina Central

Team	1	2	3	4	Total
Braves	7	0	7	0	14
• Eagles	0	7	6	10	23

- Date: August 28, 2021
- Location: Center Parc Stadium
  Atlanta, GA
- Game start: 6:07 p.m. CDT
- Elapsed time: 3 hours and 27 minutes
- Game attendance: 15,215
- Game weather: • Weather: TBD • Wind: TBD
- Referee: Bobby Wright
- TV announcers (ESPN): Mark Jones (play–by–play), Jay Walker (analyst), Robert Griffin III (analyst), Quint Kessenich (sideline reporter)

Scoring summary
1	10:25	ALCN	Juan Anthony Jr. 20-yard pass from Felix Harper (Cristofer Thompson kick) (10 plays, 65 yards, 4:35)	ALCN 7–0
2	00:23	NCCU	Davius Richard 6-yard rush (Adrian Olivo kick) (8 plays, 57 yards, 2:42)	TIE 7–7
3	10:25	NCCU	Davius Richard 1-yard rush (Adrian Olivo PAT blocked) (9 plays, 75 yards, 4:35)	NCCU 13–7
3	02:19	ALCN	Niko Duffey 4-yard pass from Felix Harper (Cristofer Thompson kick) (6 plays, 28 yards, 2:38)	ALCN 14–13
4	13:39	NCCU	Adrian Olivo 28-yard field goal (8 plays, 64 yards, 3:40)	NCCU 16–14
4	11:21	NCCU	Brandon Codrington 77-yard punt return (Adrian Olivo kick) (5 plays, 8 yards, 2:18)	NCCU 23–14

Statistics	Alcorn State	North Carolina Central
First downs	18	19
Total yards	325	391
Rushing yards	171	207
Passing yards	154	184
Turnovers	1	2
Time of possession	28:20	31:25

Team	Category	Player	Statistics
Alcorn State	Passing	Felix Harper	17/27, 154 yards, 2 TDs
Alcorn State	Rushing	Stadford Anderson	11 carries, 128 yards
Alcorn State	Receiving	Juan Anthony Jr.	5 receptions, 66 yards, 1 TD
North Carolina Central	Passing	Davius Richard	16/26, 184 yards, 1 INT
North Carolina Central	Rushing	Jordan Freeman	9 carries, 72 yards
North Carolina Central	Receiving	Ryan McDaniel	6 receptions, 72 yards

=== Northwestern State ===
Northwestern State at Alcorn State

Team	1	2	Total
Demons			0
Braves			0

- Date: September 11, 2021
- Location: Casem-Spinks Stadium
  Lorman, MS
- Game start: TBD CDT
- Elapsed time:
- Game attendance:
- Game weather: • Weather: TBD • Wind: TBD
- Referee:
- TV announcers ( ):

Scoring summary
1
2
3
4

Statistics	Northwestern State	Alcorn State
First downs		
Total yards		
Rushing yards		
Passing yards		
Turnovers		
Time of possession		

Team	Category	Player	Statistics
Northwestern State	Passing		
Northwestern State	Rushing		
Northwestern State	Receiving		
Alcorn State	Passing		
Alcorn State	Rushing		
Alcorn State	Receiving		

=== At South Alabama ===
Alcorn State at South Alabama

Team	1	2	3	4	Total
Braves	0	14	0	7	21
• Jaguars	7	0	21	0	28

- Date: September 18, 2021
- Location: Hancock Whitney Stadium
  Mobile, AL
- Game start: 7:05 p.m. CDT
- Elapsed time: 4 hours and 42 minutes
- Game attendance: 15,204
- Game weather: 80 °F (27 °C) • Weather: Sunny • Wind: SE 4 MPH
- Referee: Trennis Livingston
- TV announcers (ESPN3): J. D. Byars (play–by–play) and Pat Greenwood (analyst)

Scoring summary
1	02:11	USA	Kareem Walker 1-yard rush (Diego Guajardo kick) (12 plays, 70 yards, 4:31)	USA 7–0
2	06:50	ALCN	Jason Longcor 0-yard fumble returned (Cristofer Thompson kick) (3 plays, -6 yards, 2:33)	TIE 7–7
2	01:49	ALCN	Javonta Leatherwood 1-yard rush (Cristofer Thompson kick) (6 plays, 62 yards, 1:59)	ALCN 14–7
3	12:12	USA	Kareem Walker 13-yard rush (Diego Guajardo kick) (6 plays, 59 yards, 2:43)	TIE 14–14
3	10:27	USA	Kareem Walker 35-yard rush (Diego Guajardo kick) (1 play, 35 yards, 0:08)	USA 21–14
3	03:37	USA	Bryan Hill 11-yard rush (Diego Guajardo kick) (10 plays, 71 yards, 4:56)	USA 28–14
4	14:19	ALCN	Juan Anthony Jr. 2-yard pass from Felix Harper (Cristofer Thompson kick) (7 plays, 30 yards, 2:24)	USA 28–21

Statistics	Alcorn State	South Alabama
First downs	13	22
Total yards	297	396
Rushing yards	32	238
Passing yards	265	158
Turnovers	1	4
Time of possession	32:00	28:00

Team	Category	Player	Statistics
Alcorn State	Passing	Felix Harper	20/33, 265 yards, 1 TD, 1 INT
Alcorn State	Rushing	Jonathon Bolton	7 carries, 16 yards
Alcorn State	Receiving	CJ Bolar	5 receptions, 128 yards
South Alabama	Passing	Jake Bentley	14/25, 158 yards
South Alabama	Rushing	Kareem Walker	23 carries, 150 yards, 3 TDs
South Alabama	Receiving	Jalen Tolbert	2 receptions, 54 yards

=== At Arkansas–Pine Bluff ===
Alcorn State at Arkansas–Pine Bluff

Team	1	2	3	4	Total
• Braves	7	0	19	13	39
Golden Lions	23	3	6	6	38

- Date: September 23, 2021
- Location: Simmons Bank Field
  Pine Bluff, AR
- Game start: TBD CDT
- Elapsed time:
- Game attendance:
- Game weather: • Weather: TBD • Wind: TBD
- Referee:
- TV announcers (ESPNU):

Scoring summary
1
2
3
4

Statistics	Alcorn State	Arkansas–Pine Bluff
First downs		
Total yards		
Rushing yards		
Passing yards		
Turnovers		
Time of possession		

Team	Category	Player	Statistics
Alcorn State	Passing		
Alcorn State	Rushing		
Alcorn State	Receiving		
Arkansas–Pine Bluff	Passing		
Arkansas–Pine Bluff	Rushing		
Arkansas–Pine Bluff	Receiving		

=== Grambling State ===
Grambling State at Alcorn State

Team	1	2	Total
Tigers			0
Braves			0

- Date: October 9, 2021
- Location: Panther Stadium at Blackshear Field
  Prairie View, TX
- Game start: TBD CDT
- Elapsed time:
- Game attendance:
- Game weather: • Weather: TBD • Wind: TBD
- Referee:
- TV announcers (ESPN3):

Scoring summary
1
2
3
4

Statistics	Grambling State	Alcorn State
First downs		
Total yards		
Rushing yards		
Passing yards		
Turnovers		
Time of possession		

Team	Category	Player	Statistics
Grambling State	Passing		
Grambling State	Rushing		
Grambling State	Receiving		
Alcorn State	Passing		
Alcorn State	Rushing		
Alcorn State	Receiving		

=== At Mississippi Valley State ===
Alcorn State at Mississippi Valley State

Team	1	2	Total
Braves			0
Delta Devils			0

- Date: October 16, 2021
- Location: Rice–Totten Stadium
  Itta Bena, MS
- Game start: 3:00 p.m. CDT
- Elapsed time:
- Game attendance:
- Game weather: • Weather: TBD • Wind: TBD
- Referee:
- TV announcers ( ):

Scoring summary
1
2
3
4

Statistics	Alcorn State	Mississippi Valley State
First downs		
Total yards		
Rushing yards		
Passing yards		
Turnovers		
Time of possession		

Team	Category	Player	Statistics
Alcorn State	Passing		
Alcorn State	Rushing		
Alcorn State	Receiving		
Mississippi Valley State	Passing		
Mississippi Valley State	Rushing		
Mississippi Valley State	Receiving		

=== At Texas Southern ===
Alcorn State at Texas Southern

Team	1	2	Total
Braves			0
Tigers			0

- Date: October 23, 2021
- Location: BBVA Stadium
  Houston, TX
- Game start: 7:00 p.m. CDT
- Elapsed time:
- Game attendance:
- Game weather: • Weather: TBD • Wind: TBD
- Referee:
- TV announcers (AT&T SportsNet):

Scoring summary
1
2
3
4

Statistics	Alcorn State	Texas Southern
First downs		
Total yards		
Rushing yards		
Passing yards		
Turnovers		
Time of possession		

Team	Category	Player	Statistics
Alcorn State	Passing		
Alcorn State	Rushing		
Alcorn State	Receiving		
Texas Southern	Passing		
Texas Southern	Rushing		
Texas Southern	Receiving		

=== At Southern ===
Alcorn State at Southern

Team	1	2	3	4	Total
Braves	0	14	7	14	35
• Jaguars	7	7	7	17	38

- Date: October 30, 2021
- Location: A. W. Mumford Stadium
  Baton Rouge, LA
- Game start: 6:00 p.m. CDT
- Elapsed time: 3 hours and 28 minutes
- Game attendance: 15,333
- Game weather: • Weather: Sunny • Wind: TBD
- Referee: Bobby White
- TV announcers (ESPN3):

Scoring summary
1
2
3
4

Statistics	Alcorn State	Southern
First downs		
Total yards		
Rushing yards		
Passing yards		
Turnovers		
Time of possession		

Team	Category	Player	Statistics
Alcorn State	Passing		
Alcorn State	Rushing		
Alcorn State	Receiving		
Southern	Passing		
Southern	Rushing		
Southern	Receiving		

=== At Bethune–Cookman ===
Alcorn State at Bethune–Cookman

Team	1	2	Total
Braves			0
Wildcats			0

- Date: November 6, 2021
- Location: Daytona Stadium
  Daytona Beach, FL
- Game start: TBD CDT
- Elapsed time:
- Game attendance:
- Game weather: • Weather: TBD • Wind: TBD
- Referee:
- TV announcers ( ):

Scoring summary
1
2
3
4

Statistics	Alcorn State	Bethune–Cookman
First downs		
Total yards		
Rushing yards		
Passing yards		
Turnovers		
Time of possession		

Team	Category	Player	Statistics
Alcorn State	Passing		
Alcorn State	Rushing		
Alcorn State	Receiving		
Bethune–Cookman	Passing		
Bethune–Cookman	Rushing		
Bethune–Cookman	Receiving		

=== No. 24 Prairie View A&M ===
Prairie View A&M at Alcorn State

Team	1	2	3	4	Total
No. 24 Panthers	6	3	7	13	29
• Braves	0	24	7	0	31

- Date: November 13, 2021
- Location: Casem-Spinks Stadium
  Lorman, MS
- Game start: 2:00 p.m. CST
- Elapsed time:
- Game attendance:
- Game weather: • Weather: TBD • Wind: TBD
- Referee:
- TV announcers ( ):

Scoring summary
1
2
3
4

Statistics	Prairie View A&M	Alcorn State
First downs		
Total yards		
Rushing yards		
Passing yards		
Turnovers		
Time of possession		

Team	Category	Player	Statistics
Prairie View A&M	Passing		
Prairie View A&M	Rushing		
Prairie View A&M	Receiving		
Alcorn State	Passing		
Alcorn State	Rushing		
Alcorn State	Receiving		

=== At No. 19 Jackson State ===
Alcorn State at Jackson State

Team	1	2	Total
Braves			0
No. 19 Tigers			0

- Date: November 20, 2021
- Location: Mississippi Veterans Memorial Stadium
  Jackson, MS
- Game start: 1:00 p.m. CST
- Elapsed time:
- Game attendance:
- Game weather: • Weather: TBD • Wind: TBD
- Referee:
- TV announcers (ESPN3):

Scoring summary
1
2
3
4

Statistics	Alcorn State	Jackson State
First downs		
Total yards		
Rushing yards		
Passing yards		
Turnovers		
Time of possession		

Team	Category	Player	Statistics
Alcorn State	Passing		
Alcorn State	Rushing		
Alcorn State	Receiving		
Jackson State	Passing		
Jackson State	Rushing		
Jackson State	Receiving		
