= Fanplex =

Entertainment center in Atlanta, Georgia

Coordinates: 33.73405°N 84.38739°W

Fanplex was an entertainment center in Atlanta, Georgia, adjacent to Turner Field. It opened in 2002 and was shut down in early 2004 after losing $500,000, above and beyond an initial investment of $2.5 million.

The attraction was meant to lure fans of the Atlanta Braves with miniature golf and video games, and to pump economic activity into the depressed area around the stadium. However, Fanplex saw little business, even on game days, perhaps since it was actually located far away from most game-day foot traffic. An initial staff of 16 was pared down to one and operating hours were scaled back as patrons continued not to show up.

Critics alleged that the Fanplex was largely built to justify the continued existence of the Atlanta-Fulton County Recreation Authority, which was originally created to manage Atlanta–Fulton County Stadium and The Omni Coliseum (both of which no longer existed), along with Zoo Atlanta.

The facility was put up for sale twice, but cannot find a buyer at the $2.7 million price it has sought. The miniature golf course is now overgrown and nearby residents complain that the facility has become another vacant parking lot. With seemingly few commercial prospects for the current facility, Atlanta leaders quoted by the paper speculate Fanplex may ultimately be swept up in large-scale redevelopment of areas around the stadium.
