= 2021 Florida A&M Rattlers football team =

American college football season

2021 Florida A&M Rattlers football

NCAA Division I First Round, L 14–38 vs. Southeastern Louisiana
- Conference: Southwestern Athletic Conference
- East Division

Ranking
- STATS: No. 25
- FCS Coaches: No. 24
- Record: 9–3 (7–1 SWAC)
- Head coach: Willie Simmons (3rd season)
- Co-offensive coordinators: Kenneth Black (2nd season); Ryan Stanchek (1st season)
- Offensive scheme: Spread
- Co-defensive coordinators: Brandon Sharp (1st season); Ryan Smith (2nd season)
- Base defense: 4–3
- Home stadium: Bragg Memorial Stadium

2021 Southwestern Athletic Conference football standings
	Conf.			Overall
Team	W		L	W		L
East Division
No. 22 Jackson State x$	8	–	0	11	–	2
No. 25 Florida A&M ^	7	–	1	9	–	3
Alabama A&M	5	–	3	7	–	3
Mississippi Valley State	3	–	5	4	–	7
Alabama State	3	–	5	5	–	6
Bethune–Cookman	2	–	6	2	–	9
West Division
Prairie View A&M x	6	–	2	7	–	5
Alcorn State	5	–	3	6	–	5
Grambling State	3	–	5	4	–	7
Southern	3	–	5	4	–	7
Texas Southern	2	–	6	2	–	8
Arkansas–Pine Bluff	1	–	7	2	–	9
Championship: Jackson State 27, Prairie View A&M 10
$ – Conference champion; x – Division champion/co-champions; y – Championship game participant; ^ – FCS playoff participant; Rankings from STATS Poll

The 2021 Florida A&M Rattlers football team represented Florida A&M University in the 2021 NCAA Division I FCS football season. The Rattlers played their home games at Bragg Memorial Stadium in Tallahassee, Florida, and competed in the East Division of the Southwestern Athletic Conference (SWAC). They were led by third-year head coach Willie Simmons.

== Schedule ==
Date	Time	Opponent	Rank	Site	TV	Result	Attendance
September 5	3:00 p.m.	vs. Jackson State		Hard Rock Stadium; Miami Gardens, FL (Orange Blossom Classic)	ESPN2	L 6–7	31,000
September 11	6:00 p.m.	Fort Valley State*		Bragg Memorial Stadium; Tallahassee, FL	Facebook	W 34–7	0
September 18	7:00 p.m.	at South Florida*		Raymond James Stadium; Tampa, FL	ESPN+	L 17–38	29,475
October 2	6:00 p.m.	Alabama State		Bragg Memorial Stadium; Tallahassee, FL	ESPN+	W 28–0	21,087
October 9	6:00 p.m.	South Carolina State*		Bragg Memorial Stadium; Tallahassee, FL	Facebook	W 30–7	14,892
October 16	2:00 p.m.	at Alabama A&M		Louis Crews Stadium; Normal, AL	ESPN3	W 35–31	8,375
October 23	4:00 p.m.	at Mississippi Valley State		Rice–Totten Stadium; Itta Bena, MS	YouTube	W 31–28	2,700
October 30	4:00 p.m.	Grambling State^{†}		Bragg Memorial Stadium; Tallahassee, FL	ESPN3	W 26–3	31,887
November 6	5:00 p.m.	at Southern		A. W. Mumford Stadium; Baton Rouge, LA	ESPN3	W 29–17	15,665
November 13	3:00 p.m.	at Arkansas–Pine Bluff		Simmons Bank Field; Pine Bluff, AR	ESPN3	W 37–7	3,451
November 20	3:30 p.m.	vs. Bethune–Cookman	No. 23	Camping World Stadium; Orlando, FL (Florida Classic)	ESPN3	W 46–21	54,198
November 27	7:00 p.m.	at No. 18 Southeastern Louisiana*	No. 22	Strawberry Stadium; Hammond, LA (NCAA Division I First Round)	ESPN+	L 14–38	4,125
*Non-conference game; ^{†}Homecoming; Rankings from STATS Poll released prior to the game; All times are in Eastern time

== Game summaries ==
=== Vs. Jackson State ===
Florida A&M vs. Jackson State

Team	1	2	3	4	Total
Rattlers	3	3	0	0	6
• Tigers	0	7	0	0	7

- Date: September 5, 2021
- Location: Hard Rock Stadium
  Miami Gardens, FL
- Game start: 2:00 p.m. CDT
- Elapsed time: 3 hours and 35 minutes
- Game attendance: 36,000
- Game weather: 92 °F (33 °C) • Weather: Rainy • Wind: 6mph
- Referee:
- TV announcers (ESPN2):

Scoring summary
1	8:32	FAMU	Jose Romo-Martinez 21-yard field goal	FAMU 3–0
2	11:47	JSU	Shedeur Sanders 1-yard run (Glenn Misiak kick)	JSU 7–3
2	6:02	FAMU	Jose Romo-Martinez 39-yard field goal	JSU 7–6

Statistics	Florida A&M	Jackson State
First downs	17	15
Total yards	234	292
Rushing yards	109	71
Passing yards	125	221
Turnovers	2	3
Time of possession	32:18	27:42

Team	Category	Player	Statistics
Florida A&M	Passing	Rasean McKay	18/29, 78 yards, 0 TD
Florida A&M	Rushing	Bishop Bonnett	15 carries, 76 yards
Florida A&M	Receiving	Chad Hunter	7 receptions, 49 yards
Jackson State	Passing	Shedeur Sanders	18/24, 221 yards, 0 TD
Jackson State	Rushing	Peytton Pickett	15 carries, 62 yards
Jackson State	Receiving	Trevonte Rucker	3 receptions, 83 yards

=== Fort Valley State ===
Fort Valley State at Florida A&M

Team	1	2	3	4	Total
Wildcats	0	7	0	0	7
• Rattlers	7	0	14	13	34

- Date: September 11, 2021
- Location: Bragg Memorial Stadium
  Tallahassee, FL
- Game start: 6:00 p.m. EDT
- Elapsed time:
- Game attendance:
- Game weather: • Weather: TBD • Wind: TBD
- Referee:
- TV announcers ( ):

Scoring summary
1
2
3
4

Statistics	Fort Valley State	Florida A&M
First downs		
Total yards		
Rushing yards		
Passing yards		
Turnovers		
Time of possession		

Team	Category	Player	Statistics
Fort Valley State	Passing		
Fort Valley State	Rushing		
Fort Valley State	Receiving		
Florida A&M	Passing		
Florida A&M	Rushing		
Florida A&M	Receiving		

=== At South Florida ===
Florida A&M at South Florida

Team	1	2	3	4	Total
Rattlers	3	0	7	7	17
• Bulls	10	14	7	7	38

- Date: September 18, 2021
- Location: Raymond James Stadium
  Tampa, FL
- Game start: 7:06 p.m. EDT
- Elapsed time: 3 hours and 33 minutes
- Game attendance: 29,475
- Game weather: 81 °F (27 °C) • Weather: Cloudy • Wind: N 7 MPH
- Referee: Tim Rich
- TV announcers (ESPN+): Drew Fellios (play–by–play) and Leger Douzable (analyst)

Scoring summary
1	09:39	USF	Spencer Shrader 49-yard field goal (4 plays, 5 yards, 1:26)	USF 3–0
1	07:27	FAMU	Jose Romo-Martinez 49-yard field goal (7 plays, 43 yards, 2:12)	TIE 3–3
1	03:43	USF	Jaren Mangham 2-yard rush (Spencer Shrader kick) (8 plays, 75 yards, 3:44)	USF 10–3
2	13:47	USF	Xavier Weaver 9-yard pass from Timmy McClain (Spencer Shrader kick) (10 plays, 49 yards, 3:23)	USF 17–3
2	03:31	USF	Jaren Mangham 4-yard rush (Spencer Shrader kick) (7 plays, 26 yards, 2:25)	USF 24–3
3	04:53	FAMU	Terrell Jennings 33-yard rush (Jose Romo-Martinez kick) (8 plays, 82 yards, 3:27)	USF 24–10
3	02:02	USF	Jaren Mangham 9-yard rush (Spencer Shrader kick) (6 plays, 87 yards, 2:43)	USF 31–10
4	06:10	FAMU	Jah'Marae Sheread 6-yard pass from Rasean McKay (Jose Romo-Martinez kick) (6 plays, 20 yards, 2:39)	USF 31–17
4	00:18	USF	Yasias Young 1-yard rush (Spencer Shrader kick) (4 plays, 14 yards, 1:55)	USF 38–17

Statistics	Florida A&M	South Florida
First downs	20	22
Total yards	380	406
Rushing yards	132	243
Passing yards	248	163
Turnovers	1	1
Time of possession	29:38	30:14

Team	Category	Player	Statistics
Florida A&M	Passing	Rasean McKay	25/49, 248 yards, 1 TD
Florida A&M	Rushing	Terrell Jennings	6 carries, 93 yards, 1 TD
Florida A&M	Receiving	Xavier Smith	15 receptions, 139 yards
South Florida	Passing	Timmy McClain	12/23, 163 yards, 1 TD
South Florida	Rushing	Brian Battie	10 carries, 139 yards
South Florida	Receiving	Xavier Weaver	5 receptions, 77 yards, 1 TD

=== Alabama State ===
Alabama State at Florida A&M

Team	1	2	3	4	Total
Hornets	0	0	0	0	0
• Rattlers	7	14	0	7	28

- Date: October 2, 2021
- Location: Bragg Memorial Stadium
  Tallahassee, FL
- Game start: 6:00 p.m. EDT
- Elapsed time:
- Game attendance:
- Game weather: • Weather: TBD • Wind: TBD
- Referee:
- TV announcers ( ):

Scoring summary
1
2
3
4

Statistics	Alabama State	Florida A&M
First downs		
Total yards		
Rushing yards		
Passing yards		
Turnovers		
Time of possession		

Team	Category	Player	Statistics
Alabama State	Passing		
Alabama State	Rushing		
Alabama State	Receiving		
Florida A&M	Passing		
Florida A&M	Rushing		
Florida A&M	Receiving		

=== South Carolina State ===
South Carolina State at Florida A&M

Team	1	2	3	4	Total
Bulldogs	0	0	0	7	7
• Rattlers	0	20	7	3	30

- Date: October 9, 2021
- Location: Bragg Memorial Stadium
  Tallahassee, FL
- Game start: 6:00 p.m. EDT
- Elapsed time:
- Game attendance:
- Game weather: • Weather: TBD • Wind: TBD
- Referee:
- TV announcers ( ):

Scoring summary
1
2
3
4

Statistics	South Carolina State	Florida A&M
First downs		
Total yards		
Rushing yards		
Passing yards		
Turnovers		
Time of possession		

Team	Category	Player	Statistics
South Carolina State	Passing		
South Carolina State	Rushing		
South Carolina State	Receiving		
Florida A&M	Passing		
Florida A&M	Rushing		
Florida A&M	Receiving		

=== At Alabama A&M ===
Florida A&M at Alabama A&M

Team	1	2	Total
Rattlers			0
Bulldogs			0

- Date: October 16, 2021
- Location: Louis Crews Stadium
  Huntsville, AL
- Game start: 2:00 p.m. EDT
- Elapsed time:
- Game attendance:
- Game weather: • Weather: TBD • Wind: TBD
- Referee:
- TV announcers (ESPN3):

Scoring summary
1
2
3
4

Statistics	Florida A&M	Alabama A&M
First downs		
Total yards		
Rushing yards		
Passing yards		
Turnovers		
Time of possession		

Team	Category	Player	Statistics
Florida A&M	Passing		
Florida A&M	Rushing		
Florida A&M	Receiving		
Alabama A&M	Passing		
Alabama A&M	Rushing		
Alabama A&M	Receiving		

=== At Mississippi Valley State ===
Mississippi Valley State at Florida A&M

Team	1	2	Total
Delta Devils			0
Rattlers			0

- Date: October 23, 2021
- Location: Rice–Totten Stadium
  Itta Bena, MS
- Game start: 4:00 p.m. EDT
- Elapsed time:
- Game attendance:
- Game weather: • Weather: TBD • Wind: TBD
- Referee:
- TV announcers ( ):

Scoring summary
1
2
3
4

Statistics	Florida A&M	Mississippi Valley State
First downs		
Total yards		
Rushing yards		
Passing yards		
Turnovers		
Time of possession		

Team	Category	Player	Statistics
Florida A&M	Passing		
Florida A&M	Rushing		
Florida A&M	Receiving		
Mississippi Valley State	Passing		
Mississippi Valley State	Rushing		
Mississippi Valley State	Receiving		

=== Grambling State ===
Grambling State at Florida A&M

Team	1	2	Total
Tigers			0
Rattlers			0

- Date: October 30, 2021
- Location: Bragg Memorial Stadium
  Tallahassee, FL
- Game start: 4:00 p.m. EDT
- Elapsed time:
- Game attendance:
- Game weather: • Weather: TBD • Wind: TBD
- Referee:
- TV announcers (ESPN3):

Scoring summary
1
2
3
4

Statistics	Grambling State	Florida A&M
First downs		
Total yards		
Rushing yards		
Passing yards		
Turnovers		
Time of possession		

Team	Category	Player	Statistics
Grambling State	Passing		
Grambling State	Rushing		
Grambling State	Receiving		
Florida A&M	Passing		
Florida A&M	Rushing		
Florida A&M	Receiving		

=== At Southern ===
Florida A&M at Southern

Team	1	2	3	4	Total
• Rattlers	7	13	3	6	29
Jaguars	14	3	0	0	17

- Date: November 6, 2021
- Location: A. W. Mumford Stadium
  Baton Rouge, LA
- Game start: 5:00 p.m. EDT
- Elapsed time: 3 hours and 12 minutes
- Game attendance: 15,665
- Game weather: • Weather: Sunny • Wind: TBD
- Referee: Y.N. Miles
- TV announcers (ESPN+):

Scoring summary
1
2
3
4

Statistics	Florida A&M	Southern
First downs		
Total yards		
Rushing yards		
Passing yards		
Turnovers		
Time of possession		

Team	Category	Player	Statistics
Florida A&M	Passing		
Florida A&M	Rushing		
Florida A&M	Receiving		
Southern	Passing		
Southern	Rushing		
Southern	Receiving		

=== At Arkansas–Pine Bluff ===
Florida A&M at Arkansas–Pine Bluff

Team	1	2	Total
Rattlers			0
Golden Lions			0

- Date: November 13, 2021
- Location: Simmons Bank Field
  Pine Bluff, AR
- Game start: 3:00 p.m. EST
- Elapsed time:
- Game attendance:
- Game weather: • Weather: TBD • Wind: TBD
- Referee:
- TV announcers (ESPN3):

Scoring summary
1
2
3
4

Statistics	Florida A&M	Arkansas–Pine Bluff
First downs		
Total yards		
Rushing yards		
Passing yards		
Turnovers		
Time of possession		

Team	Category	Player	Statistics
Florida A&M	Passing		
Florida A&M	Rushing		
Florida A&M	Receiving		
Arkansas–Pine Bluff	Passing		
Arkansas–Pine Bluff	Rushing		
Arkansas–Pine Bluff	Receiving		

=== Vs. Bethune–Cookman ===
Bethune–Cookman vs. Florida A&M

Team	1	2	Total
Wildcats			0
No. 23 Rattlers			0

- Date: November 20, 2021
- Location: Camping World Stadium
  Orlando, FL
- Game start: TBD EST
- Elapsed time:
- Game attendance:
- Game weather: • Weather: TBD • Wind: TBD
- Referee:
- TV announcers (ESPN3):

Scoring summary
1
2
3
4

Statistics	Bethune–Cookman	Florida A&M
First downs		
Total yards		
Rushing yards		
Passing yards		
Turnovers		
Time of possession		

Team	Category	Player	Statistics
Bethune–Cookman	Passing		
Bethune–Cookman	Rushing		
Bethune–Cookman	Receiving		
Florida A&M	Passing		
Florida A&M	Rushing		
Florida A&M	Receiving		

== FCS Playoffs ==
=== Vs. No. 18 Southeastern Louisiana – first round ===
	1	2	3	4	Total
No. 22 Florida A&M	0	0	0	14	14
No. 18 Lions	7	17	7	7	38
