= 2021 Jackson State Tigers football team =

American college football season

2021 Jackson State Tigers football

SWAC champion SWAC East Division champion

SWAC Championship Game, W 27–10 vs. Prairie View A&M

Celebration Bowl, L 10–31 vs. South Carolina State
- Conference: Southwestern Athletic Conference
- East Division

Ranking
- STATS: No. 22
- FCS Coaches: No. 19
- Record: 11–2 (8–0 SWAC)
- Head coach: Deion Sanders (2nd season)
- Co-offensive coordinators: Michael Pollock (2nd season); Jason Phillips (2nd season)
- Offensive scheme: Run and shoot
- Defensive coordinator: Dennis Thurman (2nd season)
- Base defense: 3–4
- Home stadium: Mississippi Veterans Memorial Stadium

2021 Southwestern Athletic Conference football standings
	Conf.			Overall
Team	W		L	W		L
East Division
No. 22 Jackson State x$	8	–	0	11	–	2
No. 25 Florida A&M ^	7	–	1	9	–	3
Alabama A&M	5	–	3	7	–	3
Mississippi Valley State	3	–	5	4	–	7
Alabama State	3	–	5	5	–	6
Bethune–Cookman	2	–	6	2	–	9
West Division
Prairie View A&M x	6	–	2	7	–	5
Alcorn State	5	–	3	6	–	5
Grambling State	3	–	5	4	–	7
Southern	3	–	5	4	–	7
Texas Southern	2	–	6	2	–	8
Arkansas–Pine Bluff	1	–	7	2	–	9
Championship: Jackson State 27, Prairie View A&M 10
$ – Conference champion; x – Division champion/co-champions; y – Championship game participant; ^ – FCS playoff participant; Rankings from STATS Poll

The 2021 Jackson State Tigers football team represented Jackson State University in the 2021 NCAA Division I FCS football season. The Tigers played their home games at Mississippi Veterans Memorial Stadium in Jackson, Mississippi, and competed in the East Division of the Southwestern Athletic Conference (SWAC). They were led by second-year head coach Deion Sanders.

== Schedule ==
Date	Time	Opponent	Rank	Site	TV	Result	Attendance
September 5	2:00 p.m.	vs. Florida A&M		Hard Rock Stadium; Miami Gardens, FL (Orange Blossom Classic)	ESPN2	W 7–6	36,000
September 11	6:00 p.m.	vs. Tennessee State*		Liberty Bowl Memorial Stadium; Memphis, TN (Southern Heritage Classic)	ESPN3/ESPNU	W 38–16	46,171
September 18	7:00 p.m.	at Louisiana–Monroe*		Malone Stadium; Monroe, LA	ESPN3	L 7–12	21,720
September 25	2:00 p.m.	Delta State*		Mississippi Veterans Memorial Stadium; Jackson, MS	Jackson State Sports Network	W 24–17	33,652
October 9	2:00 p.m.	at Alabama A&M		Louis Crews Stadium; Huntsville, AL	ESPN+	W 61–15	21,835
October 16	2:00 p.m.	Alabama State^{†}		Mississippi Veterans Memorial Stadium; Jackson, MS	ESPN+	W 28–7	53,578
October 23	3:00 p.m.	Bethune–Cookman	No. 24	Mississippi Veterans Memorial Stadium; Jackson, MS	ESPN+	W 42–12	26,428
October 30	3:00 p.m.	at Mississippi Valley State	No. 20	Rice–Totten Stadium; Itta Bena, MS	YouTube	W 28–19	10,000
November 6	1:00 p.m.	Texas Southern	No. 19	Mississippi Veterans Memorial Stadium; Jackson, MS	Jackson State Sports Network	W 41–21	31,078
November 13	1:00 p.m.	at Southern	No. 18	A. W. Mumford Stadium; Baton Rouge, LA (The Boombox Classic)	ESPN3	W 21–17	25,379
November 20	1:00 p.m.	Alcorn State	No. 19	Mississippi Veterans Memorial Stadium; Jackson, MS (Soul Bowl)	ESPN+	W 24–10	58,892
December 4	3:00 p.m.	Prairie View A&M	No. 15	Mississippi Veterans Memorial Stadium; Jackson, MS (SWAC Championship Game)	ESPN2	W 27–10	50,128
December 18	12:00 p.m.	vs. South Carolina State*	No. 15	Mercedes-Benz Stadium; Atlanta, GA (Celebration Bowl)	ABC	L 10–31	48,653
*Non-conference game; ^{†}Homecoming; Rankings from STATS Poll released prior to the game; All times are in Central time

== Staff ==
Staff
Name	Position	Consecutive season at Jackson State in current position
Deion Sanders	Head Coach	2nd
Otis Riddley	Director of player personnel	2nd
Michael Pollock	Co-offensive coordinator/quarterbacks	2nd
Jason Phillips	Co-offensive coordinator/wide receivers coach	2nd
Dennis Thurman	Defensive coordinator	2nd
Alan Ricard	Special teams coordinator	2nd
T.C. Taylor	Tight ends coach	3rd
Mike Markuson	Offensive line coach	2nd
Gary Harrell	Running Backs Coach	2nd
Jeff Weeks	Defensive line coach	2nd
Andre' Hart	Linebackers Coach	2nd
Kevin Mathis	Defensive backs coach	2nd

== Game summaries ==
=== Vs. Florida A&M ===
Florida A&M vs. Jackson State

Team	1	2	3	4	Total
Rattlers	3	3	0	0	6
• Tigers	0	7	0	0	7

- Date: September 5
- Location: Hard Rock Stadium
  Miami Gardens, Florida
- Game start: 2:00 p.m. CDT
- Elapsed time: 3 hours and 35 minutes
- Game attendance: 36,000
- Game weather: 92 °F (33 °C) • Weather: Rainy • Wind: 6mph
- Referee:
- TV announcers (ESPN2):

Scoring summary
1	8:32	FAMU	Jose Romo-Martinez 21-yard field goal	FAMU 3–0
2	11:47	JSU	Shedeur Sanders 1-yard run (Glenn Misiak kick)	JSU 7–3
2	6:02	FAMU	Jose Romo-Martinez 39-yard field goal	JSU 7–6

Statistics	FAMU	JKST
First downs	17	15
Total yards	234	292
Rushing yards	109	71
Passing yards	125	221
Turnovers	2	3
Time of possession	32:18	27:42

Team	Category	Player	Statistics
Florida A&M	Passing	Rasean McKay	18/29, 78 yards
Florida A&M	Rushing	Bishop Bonnett	15 carries, 76 yards
Florida A&M	Receiving	Chad Hunter	7 receptions, 49 yards
Jackson State	Passing	Shedeur Sanders	18/24, 221 yards
Jackson State	Rushing	Peytton Pickett	15 carries, 62 yards
Jackson State	Receiving	Trevonte Rucker	3 receptions, 83 yards

=== Vs. Tennessee State ===
Tennessee State vs. Jackson State

Team	1	2	3	4	Total
TSU Tigers	0	7	0	9	16
• JSU Tigers	7	3	14	14	38

- Date: September 11, 2021
- Location: Liberty Bowl Memorial Stadium
  Memphis, Tennessee
- Game start: 6:00 p.m. CDT
- Elapsed time: 3:22
- Game attendance: 46,171
- Game weather: • Weather: – • Wind: –
- Referee:
- TV announcers (ESPN3/ESPNU):

Scoring summary
Q1	0:19	JSU	Joshua Lanier 14-yard pass from Shedeur Sanders (Glenn Misiak kick)	0–7
Q2	9:36	TSU	Deveon Bryant 2-yard run (Antonio Zita kick)	7–7
Q2	0:32	JSU	Glenn Misiak 28-yard field goal	7–10
Q3	11:30	JSU	Keith Corbin 67-yard pass from Shedeur Sanders (Glenn Misiak kick)	7–17
Q3	2:22	JSU	Shane Hooks 10-yard pass from Shedeur Sanders (Glenn Misiak kick)	7–24
Q4	13:17	TSU	Chayil Garnett 37-yard field goal	10–24
Q4	7:29	JSU	Warren Newman 81-yard punt return (Glenn Misiak kick)	10–31
Q4	2:55	JSU	Peytton Pickett 4-yard run (Glenn Misiak kick)	10–38
Q4	0:06	TSU	Rodell Rahmaan 47-yard pass from Geremy Hickbottom (2-point fail)	16–38

Statistics	TNST	JKST
First downs	19	19
Total yards	264	404
Rushing yards	70	42
Passing yards	194	362
Turnovers	1	1
Time of possession	31:52	28:08

Team	Category	Player	Statistics
Tennessee State	Passing	Geremy Hickbottom	9/15, 138 yards, TD
Tennessee State	Rushing	Devon Starling	11 carries, 35 yards
Tennessee State	Receiving	Rodell Rahmaan	4 receptions, 94 yards, TD
Jackson State	Passing	Shedeur Sanders	30/40, 362 yards, 3 TD
Jackson State	Rushing	Peytton Pickett	11 carries, 55 yards, TD
Jackson State	Receiving	Trevonte Rucker	5 receptions, 72 yards

=== At Louisiana–Monroe ===
Jackson State at Louisiana–Monroe

Team	1	2	3	4	Total
Tigers	0	7	0	0	7
• Warhawks	3	0	3	6	12

- Date: September 18, 2021
- Location: Malone Stadium
  Monroe, Louisiana
- Game start: 7:00 p.m. CDT
- Elapsed time: 3 hours and 28 minutes
- Game attendance: 21,720
- Game weather: 86 °F (30 °C) • Weather: Cloudy • Wind: E 7 MPH
- Referee: William Bonet
- TV announcers (ESPN3): Mike Hammett (play–by–play) and Josh Pederson (analyst)

Scoring summary
Q1	9:17	ULM	Calum Sutherland 29 Yd Field Goal	0-3
Q2	6:03	JS	Joshua Lanier 24 Yd pass from Shedeur Sanders (Glenn Misiak Kick)	7-3
Q3	3:12	ULM	Calum Sutherland 45 Yd Field Goal	7-6
Q4	11:37	ULM	Calum Sutherland 42 Yd Field Goal	7-9
Q4	2:24	ULM	Calum Sutherland 49 YD Field Goal	7-12

Statistics	JKST	ULM
First downs	16	17
Total yards	285	250
Rushing yards	26	94
Passing yards	259	156
Turnovers	3	0
Time of possession	26:27	33:40

Team	Category	Player	Statistics
Jackson State	Passing	Shedeur Sanders	28/41, 259 yards, TD, INT
Jackson State	Rushing	Peytton Pickett	5 carries, 10 yards
Jackson State	Receiving	Joshua Lanier	7 receptions, 72 Yards, TD
Louisiana–Monroe	Passing	Rhett Rodriguez	16/29, 150 yards
Louisiana–Monroe	Rushing	Andrew Henry	9 carries, 52 yards
Louisiana–Monroe	Receiving	Boogie Knight	6 receptions, 78 yards

=== Delta State ===
Delta State at Jackson State

Team	1	2	Total
Statesmen			0
Tigers			0

- Date: September 25, 2021
- Location: Mississippi Veterans Memorial Stadium
  Jackson, MS
- Game start: 2:00 p.m. CDT
- Elapsed time:
- Game attendance:
- Game weather: • Weather: TBD • Wind: TBD
- Referee:
- TV announcers ( ):

Scoring summary
Q1
Q2
Q3
Q4

Statistics	Delta State	Jackson State
First downs		
Total yards		
Rushing yards		
Passing yards		
Turnovers		
Time of possession		

Team	Category	Player	Statistics
Delta State	Passing		
Delta State	Rushing		
Delta State	Receiving		
Jackson State	Passing		
Jackson State	Rushing		
Jackson State	Receiving		

=== At Alabama A&M ===
Jackson State at Alabama A&M

Team	1	2	Total
Bulldogs			0
Tigers			0

- Date: October 9, 2021
- Location: Louis Crews Stadium
  Huntsville, AL
- Game start: 2:00 p.m. CDT
- Elapsed time:
- Game attendance:
- Game weather: • Weather: TBD • Wind: TBD
- Referee:
- TV announcers (ESPN3):

Scoring summary
Q1
Q2
Q3
Q4

Statistics	Jackson State	Alabama A&M
First downs		
Total yards		
Rushing yards		
Passing yards		
Turnovers		
Time of possession		

Team	Category	Player	Statistics
Jackson State	Passing		
Jackson State	Rushing		
Jackson State	Receiving		
Alabama A&M	Passing		
Alabama A&M	Rushing		
Alabama A&M	Receiving		

=== Alabama State ===
Alabama State at Jackson State

Team	1	2	Total
Hornets			0
Tigers			0

- Date: October 16, 2021
- Location: Mississippi Veterans Memorial Stadium
  Jackson, MS
- Game start: 2:00 p.m. CDT
- Elapsed time:
- Game attendance:
- Game weather: • Weather: TBD • Wind: TBD
- Referee:
- TV announcers (ESPN3):

Scoring summary
Q1
Q2
Q3
Q4

Statistics	Alabama State	Jackson State
First downs		
Total yards		
Rushing yards		
Passing yards		
Turnovers		
Time of possession		

Team	Category	Player	Statistics
Alabama State	Passing		
Alabama State	Rushing		
Alabama State	Receiving		
Jackson State	Passing		
Jackson State	Rushing		
Jackson State	Receiving		

=== Bethune–Cookman ===
Bethune–Cookman at Jackson State

Team	1	2	Total
Wildcats			0
No. 24 Tigers			0

- Date: October 23, 2021
- Location: Mississippi Veterans Memorial Stadium
  Jackson, MS
- Game start: 1:00 p.m. CDT
- Elapsed time:
- Game attendance:
- Game weather: • Weather: TBD • Wind: TBD
- Referee:
- TV announcers (ESPN3):

Scoring summary
Q1
Q2
Q3
Q4

Statistics	Bethune–Cookman	Jackson State
First downs		
Total yards		
Rushing yards		
Passing yards		
Turnovers		
Time of possession		

Team	Category	Player	Statistics
Bethune–Cookman	Passing		
Bethune–Cookman	Rushing		
Bethune–Cookman	Receiving		
Jackson State	Passing		
Jackson State	Rushing		
Jackson State	Receiving		

=== At Mississippi Valley State ===
Jackson State at Mississippi Valley State

Team	1	2	Total
No. 20 Tigers			0
Delta Devils			0

- Date: October 30, 2021
- Location: Rice–Totten Stadium
  Itta Bena, MS
- Game start: 3:00 p.m. CDT
- Elapsed time:
- Game attendance:
- Game weather: • Weather: TBD • Wind: TBD
- Referee:
- TV announcers ( ):

Scoring summary
Q1
Q2
Q3
Q4

Statistics	Jackson State	Mississippi Valley State
First downs		
Total yards		
Rushing yards		
Passing yards		
Turnovers		
Time of possession		

Team	Category	Player	Statistics
Jackson State	Passing		
Jackson State	Rushing		
Jackson State	Receiving		
Mississippi Valley State	Passing		
Mississippi Valley State	Rushing		
Mississippi Valley State	Receiving		

=== Texas Southern ===
Texas Southern at Jackson State

Team	1	2	Total
TXSO Tigers			0
No. 19 JSU Tigers			0

- Date: November 6, 2021
- Location: Mississippi Veterans Memorial Stadium
  Jackson, MS
- Game start: 1:00 p.m. CDT
- Elapsed time:
- Game attendance:
- Game weather: • Weather: TBD • Wind: TBD
- Referee:
- TV announcers ( ):

Scoring summary
Q1
Q2
Q3
Q4

Statistics	Texas Southern	Jackson State
First downs		
Total yards		
Rushing yards		
Passing yards		
Turnovers		
Time of possession		

Team	Category	Player	Statistics
Texas Southern	Passing		
Texas Southern	Rushing		
Texas Southern	Receiving		
Jackson State	Passing		
Jackson State	Rushing		
Jackson State	Receiving		

=== At Southern ===
Jackson State at Southern

Team	1	2	3	4	Total
• No. 18 Tigers	0	7	0	14	21
Jaguars	7	7	3	0	17

- Date: November 13, 2021
- Location: A. W. Mumford Stadium
  Baton Rouge, LA
- Game start: 6:00 p.m. CST
- Elapsed time: 3 hours and 7 minutes
- Game attendance: 25,379
- Game weather: • Weather: Sunny • Wind: TBD
- Referee: Bobby Wright
- TV announcers (ESPN3):

Scoring summary
Q1
Q2
Q3
Q4

Statistics	Jackson State	Southern
First downs		
Total yards		
Rushing yards		
Passing yards		
Turnovers		
Time of possession		

Team	Category	Player	Statistics
Jackson State	Passing		
Jackson State	Rushing		
Jackson State	Receiving		
Southern	Passing		
Southern	Rushing		
Southern	Receiving		

=== Alcorn State ===
Alcorn State at Jackson State

Team	1	2	Total
Braves			0
No. 19 Tigers			0

- Date: November 20, 2021
- Location: Mississippi Veterans Memorial Stadium
  Jackson, MS
- Game start: 1:00 p.m. CST
- Elapsed time:
- Game attendance:
- Game weather: • Weather: TBD • Wind: TBD
- Referee:
- TV announcers (ESPN3):

Scoring summary
Q1
Q2
Q3
Q4

Statistics	Alcorn State	Jackson State
First downs		
Total yards		
Rushing yards		
Passing yards		
Turnovers		
Time of possession		

Team	Category	Player	Statistics
Alcorn State	Passing		
Alcorn State	Rushing		
Alcorn State	Receiving		
Jackson State	Passing		
Jackson State	Rushing		
Jackson State	Receiving		
