= Centennial Olympic Stadium =

Former stadium in Atlanta, Georgia, U.S.

Coordinates: 33°44′08″N 84°23′22″W

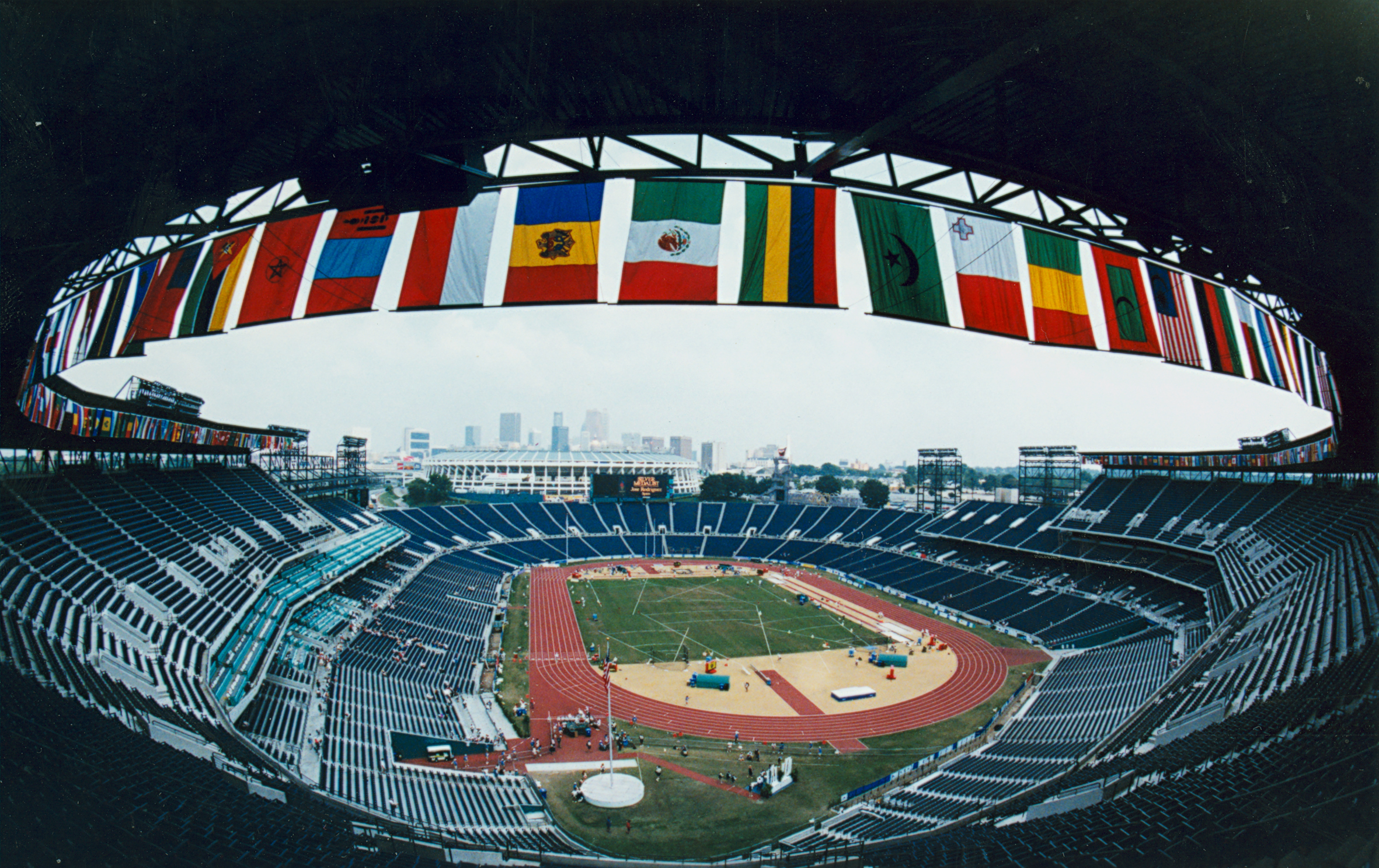
- Interior of the stadium during the 1996 Paralympic Games with Atlanta-Fulton County Stadium in the background
- Interactive map of Centennial Olympic Stadium
- Location: Atlanta, Georgia, United States
- Owner: Atlanta Fulton County Recreation Authority
- Operator: Atlanta Committee for the Olympic Games
- Capacity: 85,000
- Surface: Grass

Construction
- Groundbreaking: July 10, 1993
- Opened: May 18, 1996
- Renovated: 1996–97 (reconstructed as Turner Field); 2017 (reconstructed as Center Parc Stadium)
- Closed: August 27, 1996
- Demolished: 1996–97
- Cost: $209 million ($429 million dollars in 2025)
- Architects: Atlanta Stadium Design Team (a joint venture of Heery International, Inc., Rosser International, Inc., Williams-Russell and Johnson, Inc. and Ellerbe Becket, Inc.)

Tenants
- 1996 Summer Olympics; 1996 Summer Paralympics

Centennial Olympic Stadium was the 85,000-seat main stadium of the 1996 Summer Olympics and Paralympics in Atlanta, Georgia, United States. Construction of the stadium began in 1993, and it was complete and ready for the opening ceremony in July 1996, where it hosted track and field events and the closing ceremony.

After the Olympics and Paralympics, it was reconstructed into the baseball-specific Turner Field, used by the Atlanta Braves of Major League Baseball for 20 seasons (1997–2016). After the Braves departed for Truist Park, the facility was purchased by Georgia State University, which rebuilt the stadium a second time as Center Parc Stadium, designed for American football.

== History ==
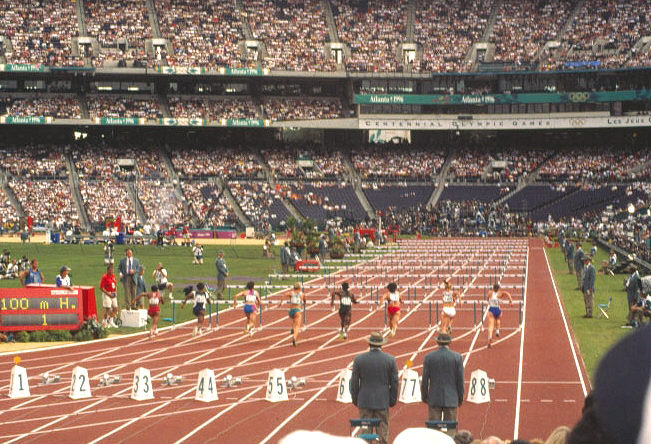
Stadium during the 1996 Summer Olympic Games. Seats in the background became the seating behind home plate for Turner Field and subsequently the south end zone for Center Parc Stadium.

During the week-long athletics program, the stadium bore witness to Donovan Bailey of Canada winning the 100 m in a world record time of 9.84 s; Michael Johnson winning both the 200 and 400 meters titles, breaking the 200 m world record in the process; and France's Marie-José Pérec also winning the 200/400 double. Meanwhile, Carl Lewis won his fourth consecutive Olympic title in the long jump, becoming only the second person, after Al Oerter, to win the same athletics event at four consecutive Games. After the closing ceremony of the 1996 Paralympics, the stadium was reconfigured so it could be leased by the Atlanta Braves.

The Atlanta Committee for the Olympic Games (ACOG) designed and built the stadium in a way that it could be converted to a new baseball stadium, and ACOG paid for the conversion. This was considered a good agreement for both the Olympic Committee and the Braves, because there would be no use for a permanent 85,000 seat track and field stadium in Downtown Atlanta since the 71,000 seat Georgia Dome had been completed four years earlier by the state of Georgia and became the home of the National Football League's Atlanta Falcons. The Braves had already been exploring opportunities for a new venue to replace Atlanta–Fulton County Stadium.

The southwest corner of the Olympic Stadium was built to accommodate the future baseball infield and seating; in the Olympic configuration of the stadium, the seats are not placed next to the oval running track. The southwest part of the stadium also had four tiers of seats, luxury boxes, a facade facing the street, and a roof, whereas the north half of the stadium used a simpler two-tiered seating configuration.

During reconstruction, the athletics track was removed and relocated to the field hockey stadium located at Clark Atlanta University, which uses it for athletics and football, and the north half of the stadium was demolished, reducing the capacity to 49,000. Because of the need to fit a track within the stadium in its earlier incarnation, the field of play, particularly foul territory, while not large by historical standards, was nonetheless larger than that of most MLB stadiums built since 1990. Reconstruction was completed in 1997, and the facility was renamed Turner Field. Afterward, Atlanta–Fulton County Stadium, the Braves' previous home and the venue for the Olympics baseball events, was imploded and the site became a parking lot for Turner Field. The Atlanta Fulton County Recreation Authority owned Turner Field, and the Atlanta Braves occupied the revised stadium until the expiration of their lease in 2016; the Braves moved to Truist Park in Cobb County in the following year.

Georgia State University acquired Turner Field and its surrounding parking lots in January 2017 for a mixed-use expansion of the Georgia State campus, which includes private and student housing, academic, retail, and office space in addition to the redevelopment of the former ballpark into Center Parc Stadium.

The Atlanta Track Club's annual Father's Day four-mile (6.4 km) road race ends inside the stadium near the warning track where the finish line was located for the Olympics.

Preceded by Estadi Olímpic de Montjuïc; Barcelona	Summer Olympics; Opening and closing ceremonies (Olympic Stadium); 1996	Succeeded by Sydney Olympic Stadium; Sydney
Preceded by Estadi Olímpic de Montjuïc; Barcelona	Summer Olympics; Olympic athletics competitions Main venue 1996	Succeeded by Sydney Olympic Stadium; Sydney
