= Center Parc Stadium =

College football stadium in Atlanta, Georgia, US

- The Parc

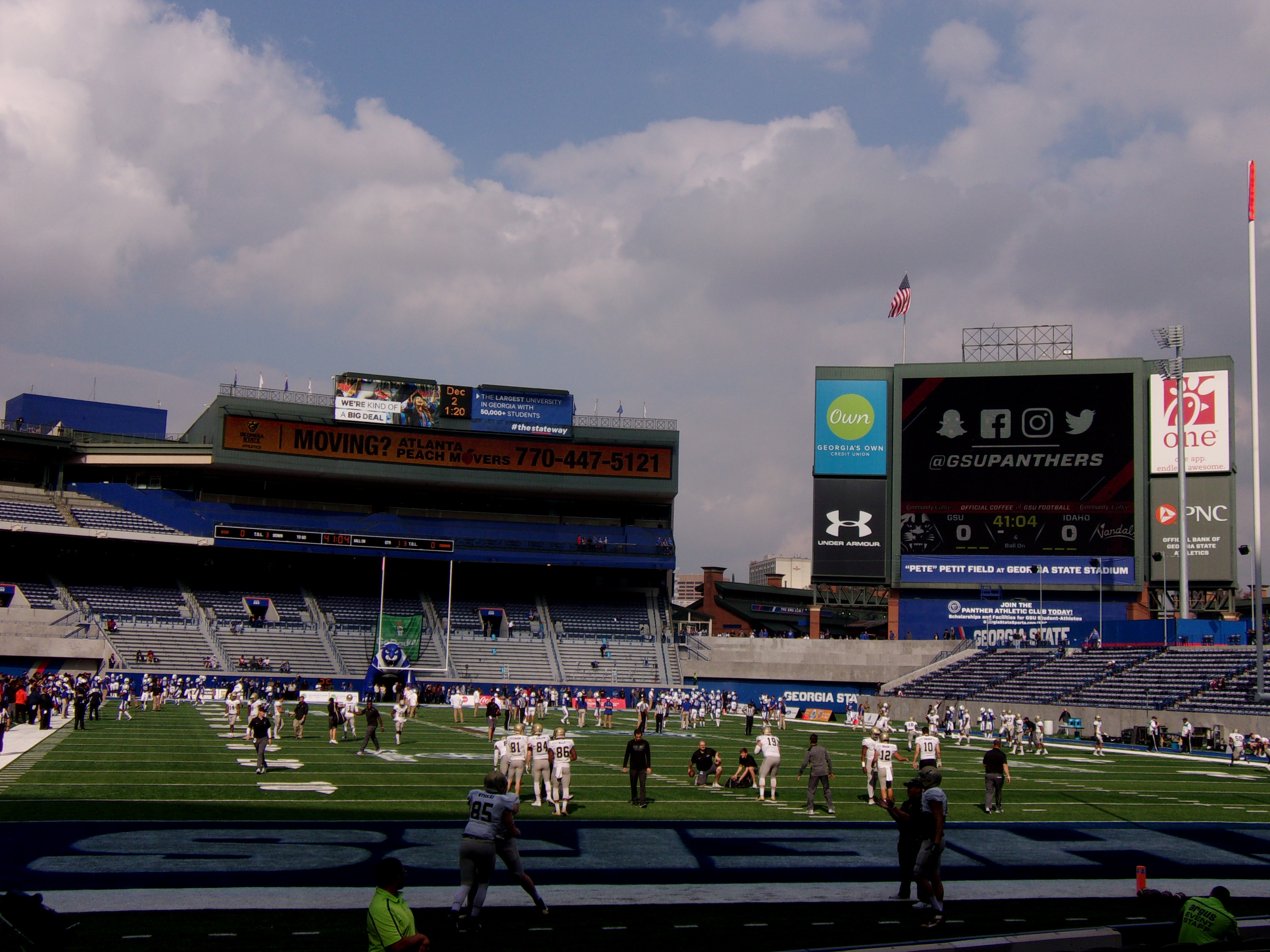
- Center Parc Stadium in December 2017

- Location in Atlanta Location in Georgia Location in the United States
- Former names: Centennial Olympic Stadium (1996); Turner Field (1997–2016); Georgia State Stadium (2017–2020)
- Address: 755 Hank Aaron Drive SE
- Location: Atlanta, Georgia
- Coordinates: 33°44′7″N 84°23′22″W
- Owner: Georgia State University
- Capacity: 24,333
- Surface: FieldTurf

Construction
- Groundbreaking: July 10, 1993 (as Centennial Olympic Stadium)
- Opened: August 18, 2017
- Renovated: 1996–97 (rebuilt as Turner Field); 2017 (rebuilt as Center Parc Stadium)
- Cost: $209 million (as Centennial Olympic Stadium) ($429 million in 2025 dollars)
- Architects: Atlanta Stadium Design Team (a joint venture of Heery International, Inc., Rosser International, Inc., Williams-Russell and Johnson, Inc. and Ellerbe Becket, Inc.)

Tenants
- Georgia State Panthers (NCAA) (2017–present); Atlanta Legends (AAF) (2019); MEAC/SWAC Challenge (NCAA) (2019–present)

Center Parc Stadium (also commonly referred to as Georgia State Stadium or GSU Stadium, formerly Turner Field) is an outdoor stadium in Atlanta, Georgia. The stadium is the home of the Georgia State Panthers football team as of the 2017 season, replacing the Georgia Dome which had served as their home stadium from the program's inception in 2010 until 2016.

It was originally built for the 1996 Summer Olympics as Centennial Olympic Stadium. Following the 1996 Summer Paralympics, the Olympic Stadium was reconfigured as designed into the baseball-specific Turner Field, serving as the home of the Atlanta Braves of Major League Baseball from 1997 until 2016. After the Braves' departure for Truist Park in Cobb County, Georgia State University acquired the stadium and its surrounding parking lots for a large scale expansion of the university's campus, including new private and student housing, academic, and retail space, in addition to the stadium redevelopment.

Center Parc Stadium is the second former Braves ballpark to be converted to a college football stadium, the first being Boston University's Nickerson Field.

== History ==
=== 1996 Summer Olympics ===
The stadium was originally constructed as the 85,000-seat Centennial Olympic Stadium and used for the 1996 Summer Olympics. Private entities, including NBC and other Olympic sponsors, agreed to pay a large sum of the cost to build the Centennial Olympic Stadium (approximately $170 million of the $209 million bill). It was complete and ready for the opening ceremony in July 1996, where it hosted track and field events and the closing ceremony.

The Atlanta Committee for the Olympic Games (ACOG) designed and built the stadium in a way that it could be readily converted to a new baseball stadium, and ACOG would pay for the conversion. This was considered a good agreement for both the Olympic Committee and the Braves. The 71,000-seat Georgia Dome had been completed four years earlier by the state of Georgia to become the home of the National Football League's Atlanta Falcons, so there was no need for another large stadium in downtown Atlanta. Furthermore, the Braves had already been exploring opportunities for a new stadium.

=== Turner Field ===
Immediately after the 1996 Summer Paralympics, which followed the Olympics, the stadium went through its first conversion. In the multimillion-dollar renovation covered by the ACOG, much of the north end of the stadium was removed in order to convert it to its permanent use as a 49,000-seat baseball park. This involved demolishing the temporary stands that had made up nearly half the Olympic stadium and replacing them with outfield stands and other attractions behind them.

The Atlanta Fulton County Recreation Authority continued to own the stadium and leased it to the Atlanta Braves of Major League Baseball from 1997 to 2016. The Braves operated the stadium. As Turner Field, the stadium hosted notable events such as games 1 and 2 of the 1999 World Series and the 2000 Major League Baseball All-Star Game. The end of the Braves' most recent lease in 2016 coincided with the team's departure for Truist Park.

=== Acquisition by Georgia State University ===
In November 2013, the Atlanta Braves announced that they would vacate Turner Field upon the expiration of their lease in 2016 after negotiations between the team and the city of Atlanta to extend the lease broke down. According to then-Braves vice chairman John Schuerholz, Turner Field required $350 million in renovations—$150 million for structural upkeep and $200 million to improve the fan experience. Then-Atlanta mayor Kasim Reed stated that the city could not afford the cost of the renovations desired by the Braves while also partially funding the construction of Mercedes-Benz Stadium for the Falcons and the renovation of Philips Arena (now known as State Farm Arena) for the National Basketball Association's Atlanta Hawks.

Between April and May 2014, Georgia State University announced its intentions to pursue the 77-acre (31 ha) Turner Field site for a mixed use development. One proposed development plan included reconfiguring Turner Field into a football stadium and building a new baseball field on the footprint of the former Atlanta–Fulton County Stadium, incorporating the wall where Hank Aaron hit his historic 715th home run; an alternate proposal submitted in November 2015 proposed adaptively reusing portions of the ballpark for a mixed housing and retail development while a new football-specific stadium was built to the north along with the aforementioned new baseball field. On December 21, 2015, the Atlanta Fulton County Recreation Authority announced that they had accepted Georgia State's bid for the stadium property. It was decided to go with the reconfiguration plan and on August 18, 2016, Georgia State and the Atlanta-Fulton County Recreation Authority reached a tentative purchase agreement for Turner Field, and the purchase and redevelopment plan was approved by the Board of Regents of the University System of Georgia on November 9, 2016.

The sale of the Turner Field property to Georgia State was officially closed on January 5, 2017, with the stadium conversion project beginning in February 2017. The stadium acquisition and renovation project was expected to cost $52.8 million; the university did not expect to add or increase student fees to fund the project, and the proceeds would come from revenue from bookstore operations, parking, and housing, as well as private donations. Renovations took place over multiple phases, and included installing an artificial turf playing surface, reorienting the lower bowl, covering upper deck seating, and upgrading locker rooms. Initial capacity for the stadium was 23,000, with future expansion for 33,000. In addition to football, the university intends to use the stadium as a multipurpose facility.

The university announced on February 9, 2017, that the Panthers' first game in Georgia State Stadium was scheduled for August 31, 2017 against Tennessee State. Reconstruction for Georgia State Stadium began on February 27, 2017, and the first phase of construction was completed prior to the Panthers' first scheduled game at the stadium. The second phase of construction took place in 2018 and built out the remainder of the stadium. While the university planned to tailor the stadium to suit the Panthers' football team and its future needs, the university also planned to honor the legacy of the 1996 Olympics and the Braves' tenure at the stadium. On August 8, 2017, the university announced that the playing surface would be named in honor of Georgia State alumnus Parker H. "Pete" Petit, who contributed $10 million towards the Panthers athletic program.

Prior to and since the acceptance of the bid from Georgia State and developers Carter and Oakwood Development for Turner Field, residents of the Summerhill and Mechanicsville neighborhoods, which lie adjacent to the stadium, have expressed their criticisms over the impending development, particularly over the potential of being displaced due to gentrification, despite both Georgia State and the developers seeking input from local residents to help mitigate their concerns. In April 2017, protesters set up a tent city near the stadium; however, the encampment was removed by the Georgia State Police Department at the behest of Summerhill residents in June 2017 for health and safety reasons.

On August 11, 2020, the university entered a naming rights agreement with the Atlanta Postal Credit Union (APCU), in a contract lasting 15 years and valued at $21 million. The stadium was renamed under APCU's new consumer brand Center Parc as Center Parc Stadium. Under the agreement, APCU can change the name of the stadium no more than twice with approval from the university and the Georgia Board of Regents.

=== Stadium firsts ===
The stadium's first event was the 2017 Corky Kell Classic, a series of high school football games, on August 18 and 19, 2017. The first Panthers home game in the stadium was on August 31, 2017, a 17–10 loss to the Tennessee State Tigers in front of an announced sellout crowd of 24,333. Georgia State's first home victory at Center Parc Stadium came on October 26, 2017, with a 21–13 victory over the South Alabama Jaguars.

Foo Fighters played the first concert at Center Parc Stadium on April 28, 2018, as part of the Concrete and Gold Tour.

The Legends' first home game was played on February 24, 2019, against the Birmingham Iron, where they lost 28–12.

On September 10, 2022, Georgia State hosted a Power 5 conference school for the first time in the Panthers' history. The game was a 35–28 loss to the North Carolina Tar Heels.

On September 14, 2024, Georgia State defeated the Vanderbilt Commodores out of the Southeastern Conference (SEC) 36–32 at Center Parc Stadium. It was Georgia State's first time hosting an SEC opponent, and their first victory against an SEC team since beating the Tennessee Volunteers on the road in 2019.

=== Other events ===
In 2018, Center Parc Stadium became the new neutral home of the MEAC/SWAC Challenge.

On May 7, 2019, the Georgia High School Association (GHSA) announced that the football championships would be moved from Mercedes-Benz Stadium to Center Parc Stadium starting in the 2019 season, citing the higher costs of renting Mercedes-Benz Stadium compared to the former Georgia Dome. The GHSA's first two years at Mercedes-Benz Stadium were also marred by logistical issues, with the six of the eight 2017 championship games postponed and moved to school sites due to a winter storm hitting Atlanta on the weekend of the championships, and the 2018 championships were moved to mid-week due to Major League Soccer's Atlanta United FC hosting MLS Cup 2018 on December 8. In December 2022, the GHSA and the Atlanta Falcons reached a three-year agreement, starting in the 2023 season, to bring the football championships back to Mercedes-Benz Stadium.

Drum Corps International has hosted the annual DCI Southeastern Championship at Center Parc Stadium since 2022.

== Access and transportation ==
Center Parc Stadium is located in the Southeastern Atlanta neighborhood of Summerhill. It is located on Hank Aaron Drive, which provides multiple parking areas.

Center Parc Stadium is also accessible from multiple bus routes near the stadium courtesy of MARTA. MARTA does not offer a direct rail station at the stadium; however, it can be accessed from the Georgia State station on the Blue/Green Line.

== Attendance records ==
Rank	Attendance	Date	Game Result
1	24,333	August 31, 2017	Georgia State 10, Tennessee State 17
2	24,238	August 26, 2023	Jackson State 37, South Carolina State 7*
3	23,333	September 1, 2019	Jackson State 15, Bethune-Cookman 36*
4	23,088	August 30, 2018	Georgia State 24, #5 (FCS) Kennesaw State 20
5	22,210	August 25, 2024	#25 (FCS) Florida A&M 24, Norfolk State 23*
6	21,720	October 19, 2019	Georgia State 28, Army 21
7	21,088	August 27, 2022	Alabama State 23, Howard 13*
8	20,351	September 7, 2019	Georgia State 48, #7 (FCS) Furman 42
9	20,011	November 24, 2018	Georgia State 14, Georgia Southern 35
10	19,587	October 11, 2025	Georgia State 20, Appalachian State 41
11	18,280	September 4, 2021	Georgia State 10, Army 43

- Indicates MEAC-SWAC Challenge

== See also ==
- List of NCAA Division I FBS football stadiums
