= Turner Field =

Former baseball stadium in Atlanta, Georgia

- The Ted

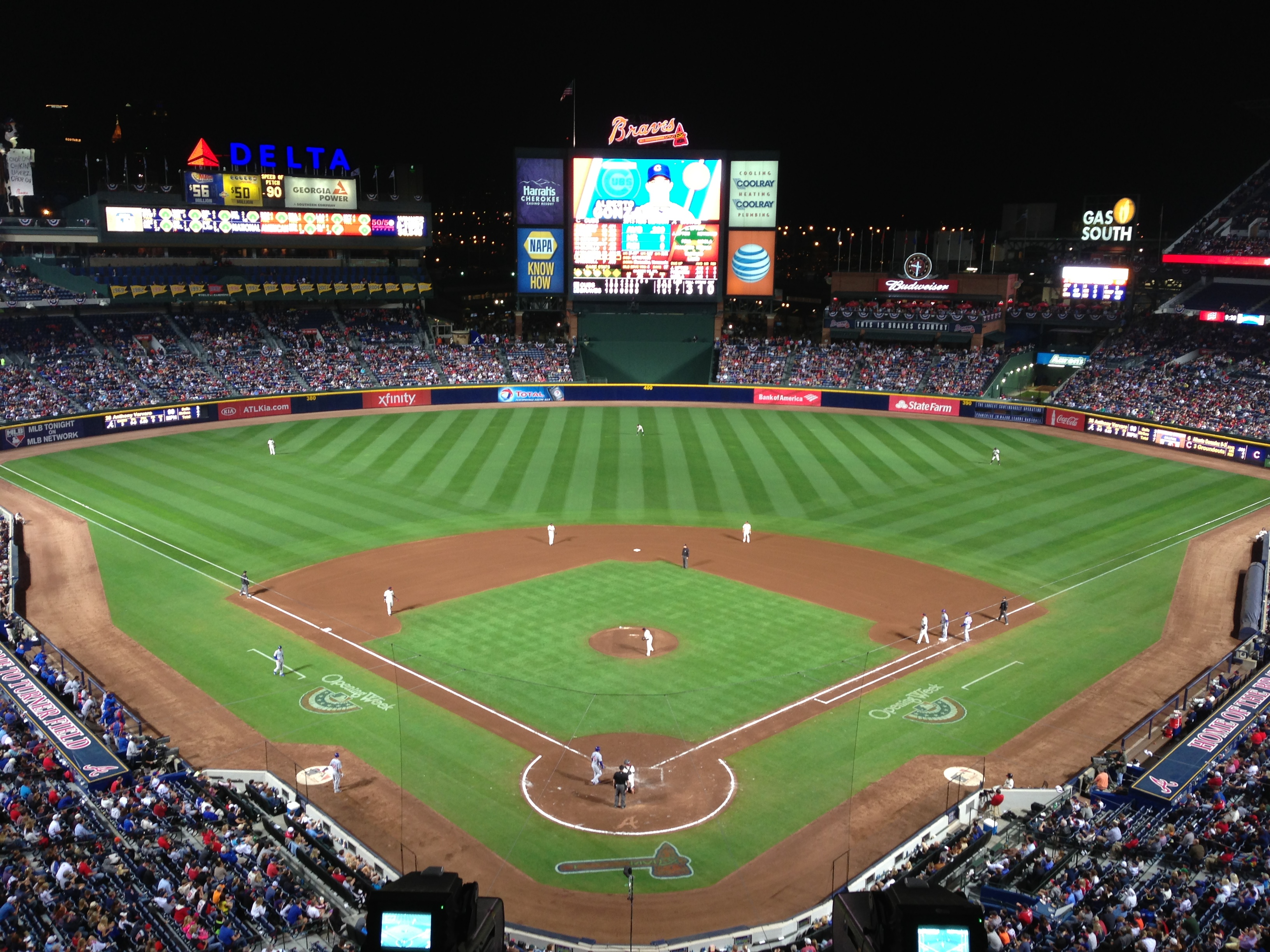
- Turner Field in 2013
- Interactive map of Turner Field
- Former names: Centennial Olympic Stadium (1996)
- Address: 755 Hank Aaron Drive
- Location: Atlanta, Georgia
- Coordinates: 33°44′7″N 84°23′22″W
- Owner: Atlanta Fulton County Recreation Authority
- Operator: Atlanta National League Baseball Club Inc.
- Capacity: 49,586
- Surface: Infield: Seashore Paspalum; Outfield: Tifway 419 Bermuda Grass
- Record attendance: 54,357 (2003-10-05 vs Chicago Cubs)
- Field size: Left Field – 335 ft (102 m); Left-Center – 380 ft (116 m); Center Field – 400 ft (122 m); Right-Center – 390 ft (119 m); Right Field – 330 ft (100.5 m); Backstop – 43 ft (13 m)
- Public transit: Hank Aaron Drive @ Ralph D Abernathy Boulevard

Construction
- Groundbreaking: July 10, 1993 (as Centennial Olympic Stadium)
- Opened: March 29, 1997; 29 years ago
- Renovated: 2017; 9 years ago (reconstructed as Center Parc Stadium)
- Closed: October 2, 2016; 10 years ago
- Demolished: 2016–17 (added concrete)
- Cost: US$209 Million ($429 million in 2025 dollars)
- Architects: Atlanta Stadium Design Team (a joint venture of Heery International, Inc., Rosser International, Inc., Williams-Russell and Johnson, Inc. and Ellerbe Becket, Inc.)
- Project manager: Barton Malow
- Structural engineer: Thornton Tomasetti
- General contractors: Atlanta Stadium Constructors (a joint venture of Beers Construction Co., HJ Russell Construction Co. and CD Moody Construction Co.)

Tenant
- Atlanta Braves (MLB) (1997–2016)

Turner Field was a baseball stadium located in Atlanta, Georgia. From 1997 to 2016, it served as the home ballpark to the Atlanta Braves of Major League Baseball (MLB). Originally built as Centennial Olympic Stadium in 1996 to serve as the centerpiece of the 1996 Summer Olympics, it was converted into a baseball stadium to serve as the new home of the team. The Braves moved less than one block from Atlanta–Fulton County Stadium, which served as their home field for 31 seasons from 1966 to 1996.

Opening during the Braves' "division dominance" years, Turner Field hosted the NLDS a total of 11 times (1997–2005, 2010, 2013), the NLCS four times (1997–1999, 2001), one World Series (1999), one NL Wild Card Game (2012, the first in baseball history), and the 2000 Major League Baseball All-Star Game. The Braves played the final game at Turner Field on October 2, 2016, a 1–0 win over the Detroit Tigers. The franchise allowed its lease on the facility to expire at the end of the calendar year. In 2017, the team moved to the newly constructed SunTrust Park (now called Truist Park), located in nearby Cobb County.

The stadium was reconfigured for the second time, redesigned for college football in 2017 as Center Parc Stadium for Georgia State University. Architecture firm Heery was responsible for both stadium conversions. The stadium is the second former Braves ballpark to be converted to a college football stadium, the first being Braves Field when it was renovated into Nickerson Field in 1955.

== History ==
The ballpark was built in the Southeastern Atlanta neighborhood of Summerhill. across the street from the former home of the Braves, Atlanta–Fulton County Stadium, which was demolished in the summer of 1997 and replaced with a parking lot. The parking lot is painted with the field location and configuration of the old ballpark. The section of the outfield wall with the monument marking where Hank Aaron's 715th home run went over it was reinstalled in its original location, and still stands today. From 2002 to 2004, the failed Fanplex entertainment center was located adjacent to the stadium's parking lot. The stadium contained 5,372 club seats, 64 luxury suites, and three party suites.

The most popular name choice among Atlanta residents for the new stadium at the time of its construction (according to a poll in The Atlanta Journal-Constitution) was Hank Aaron Stadium. After the ballpark was instead named after Ted Turner (and subsequently nicknamed "The Ted" by fans), the city of Atlanta renamed the section of Capitol Avenue on which the stadium sits Hank Aaron Drive, giving Turner Field the street number 755, after Aaron's home run total.

=== 1996 Summer Olympics ===
The stadium was originally constructed as the 85,000-seat Centennial Olympic Stadium and used for the 1996 Summer Olympics. Immediately after the 1996 Summer Paralympics, which followed the Olympics, much of the north end of the stadium was removed in order to convert it to its permanent use as a 49,000-seat baseball park. The stadium hosted the Atlanta Braves of Major League Baseball from 1997 to 2016, following a multimillion-dollar renovation to retrofit the stadium for baseball by removing the temporary stands that had made up nearly half the stadium and building the outfield stands and other attractions behind them.

After the 1996 Olympics were complete the stadium was leased by the Atlanta Braves. Private entities, including NBC and other Olympic sponsors, agreed to pay a large sum of the cost to build Centennial Olympic Stadium (approximately $170 million of the $209 million bill). The Atlanta Committee for the Olympic Games (ACOG) sought to build the stadium in a way that it could be converted to a new baseball stadium, and ACOG paid for the conversion. This was considered a good agreement for both the Olympic Committee and the Braves. The 71,228 seat Georgia Dome had been completed four years earlier by the state of Georgia, so there was no need for another large stadium in downtown Atlanta. Furthermore, the Braves had already been exploring opportunities for a new stadium. The Atlanta Fulton County Recreation Authority owns Turner Field and leased it to the Braves, who operated the stadium. The end of the Braves' most recent lease in 2016 coincided with the team's departure for SunTrust Park (now Truist Park).

Because of the need to fit a track within the stadium in its earlier configuration, the field of play, particularly foul territory, while not large by historical standards, was still larger than most MLB stadiums of its era. The fence line around the north main entrance, beyond left field, marks the original extent of Centennial Olympic Stadium.

=== Replacement ===
Turner Field was a relatively new facility, being younger than 14 of Major League Baseball's other 29 stadiums at the time of the Braves' last game there. However, the Braves executives complained that its downtown location restricted game attendance because of traffic into the city and a shortage of on-site parking. The stadium was 3/4 mile (1,200 m) from the nearest Metropolitan Atlanta Rapid Transit Authority (MARTA) stop, and many fans were unwilling to brave Atlanta's infamous congestion to attend games; plus, the team could not secure more parking spaces. In addition, team VP for business operations Mike Plant said the site "doesn't match up with where the majority of our fans come from", as the stadium is near some of Atlanta's poorest neighborhoods. Plant also said that while the Braves operated Turner Field, they had no control over the commercial development around the stadium. Other stadiums built in recent years have been accompanied by shopping and entertainment facilities in the surrounding area (as Truist Park later would be).

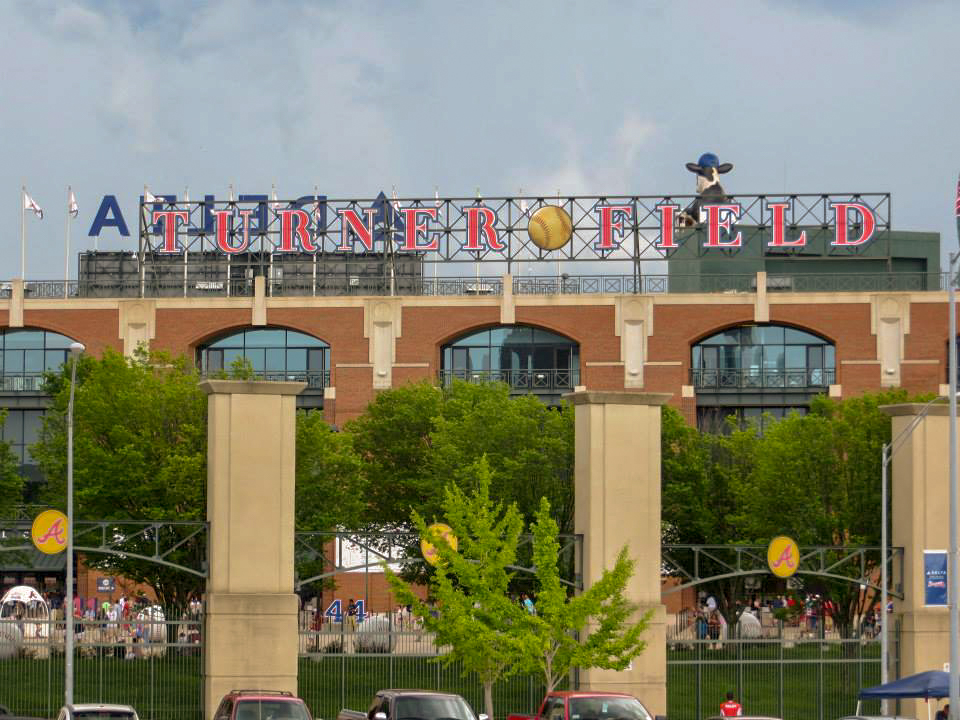
Turner Field exterior pictured from the parking lot.

According to Braves team president John Schuerholz, Turner Field required $150 million in renovation costs merely for structural upkeep, including replacing seats, lighting, and plumbing, to remain operating for the future. He estimated that fan improvement renovations would have cost an additional $200 million. The Braves were in talks in 2013 with the Recreational Authority over extending the team's original lease, Plant said, but those talks broke down. Atlanta mayor Kasim Reed said the city could not afford to support the kind of renovations the Braves desired.

After negotiations broke down, the team began planning a new stadium, SunTrust Park. The stadium would be built in southern Cobb County, with an Atlanta address, located "near the geographic center of the Braves' fan base." The new stadium was constructed in a public/private partnership. The projected cost was $672 million. It occupies 15 acres (6.1 ha) of a 60-acre (24 ha) lot, with the remainder of the space devoted to parking, green space, and mixed-use development. The new stadium is part of a 60-acre development called The Battery Atlanta. Although Cobb County is not presently served by MARTA, the Braves use a "circulator" bus system to shuttle fans to and from the stadium. Construction on SunTrust Park broke ground on September 16, 2014. Had SunTrust Park been behind schedule, the Braves had the option (but ultimately declined) to extend their lease at Turner Field up to 5 years. Braves executive vice president Mike Plant has stated that capital maintenance would be much less at SunTrust Park. While Turner Field was designed from the ground up with the Braves in mind, Plant said that it required higher capital maintenance costs in the long run because it was value engineered for the 1996 Summer Olympics. Plant estimates that capital maintenance costs at SunTrust Park will be no more than $80 million after 30 years – less than half of the $150 million in capital maintenance needed for Turner Field after 17 years.

==== Center Parc Stadium ====
In April and May 2014, Georgia State University officials expressed an interest in acquiring Turner Field and converting it into a 30,000-seat open-air stadium for the Panthers football program. New development, including retail, residential and student housing, would also be put into use on the Turner Field site. Additionally, a new baseball field would be built on the former Atlanta–Fulton County Stadium site, incorporating the outfield wall where Hank Aaron hit his record-breaking 715th home run. While Mayor Reed showed preference towards Georgia State's plan, at least three offers from other developers were up for consideration. On August 13, 2015, the Braves officially gave notice to the city of Atlanta and Fulton County that the team would not exercise the option to extend their lease at Turner Field and would vacate the stadium by December 31, 2016, allowing the Atlanta Fulton County Recreation Authority to move forward with any redevelopment plans. On November 23, 2015, Georgia State submitted an alternative proposal for redeveloping Turner Field, where portions of the current ballpark would be rebuilt into a mixed retail and housing development and a new football-specific stadium would be constructed north of Turner Field along with the new baseball field. While vetting bids for redevelopment, two casino firms showed interest in the Turner Field property; however, they did not submit bids due to Mayor Reed's and the community's opposition to casino gaming. On December 21, 2015, the Atlanta Fulton County Recreation Authority announced that they have accepted the joint bid by Georgia State University and real estate firm Carter for the stadium property. Georgia State was considered the front-runner for the property as the other two bids submitted were from little known entities with no documented redevelopment experience. Residents of the Summerhill neighborhood expressed their criticism for Turner Field's quick sale without their input; however, city and county officials stated that a quick sale was necessary to keep the burden of the stadium's security and upkeep from falling on the tax payers' shoulders once the Braves move out. On August 18, 2016, Georgia State and the Atlanta-Fulton County Recreation Authority reached a tentative purchase agreement for Turner Field, and the purchase and redevelopment plan was approved by the Board of Regents of the University System of Georgia on November 9, 2016. On January 5, 2017, the sale of the Turner Field property to Georgia State was officially closed, with the stadium conversion project beginning in February 2017. The stadium conversion would occur over multiple phases, while the first phase was completed in time for Georgia State's opener on August 31, 2017.

=== Final game ===
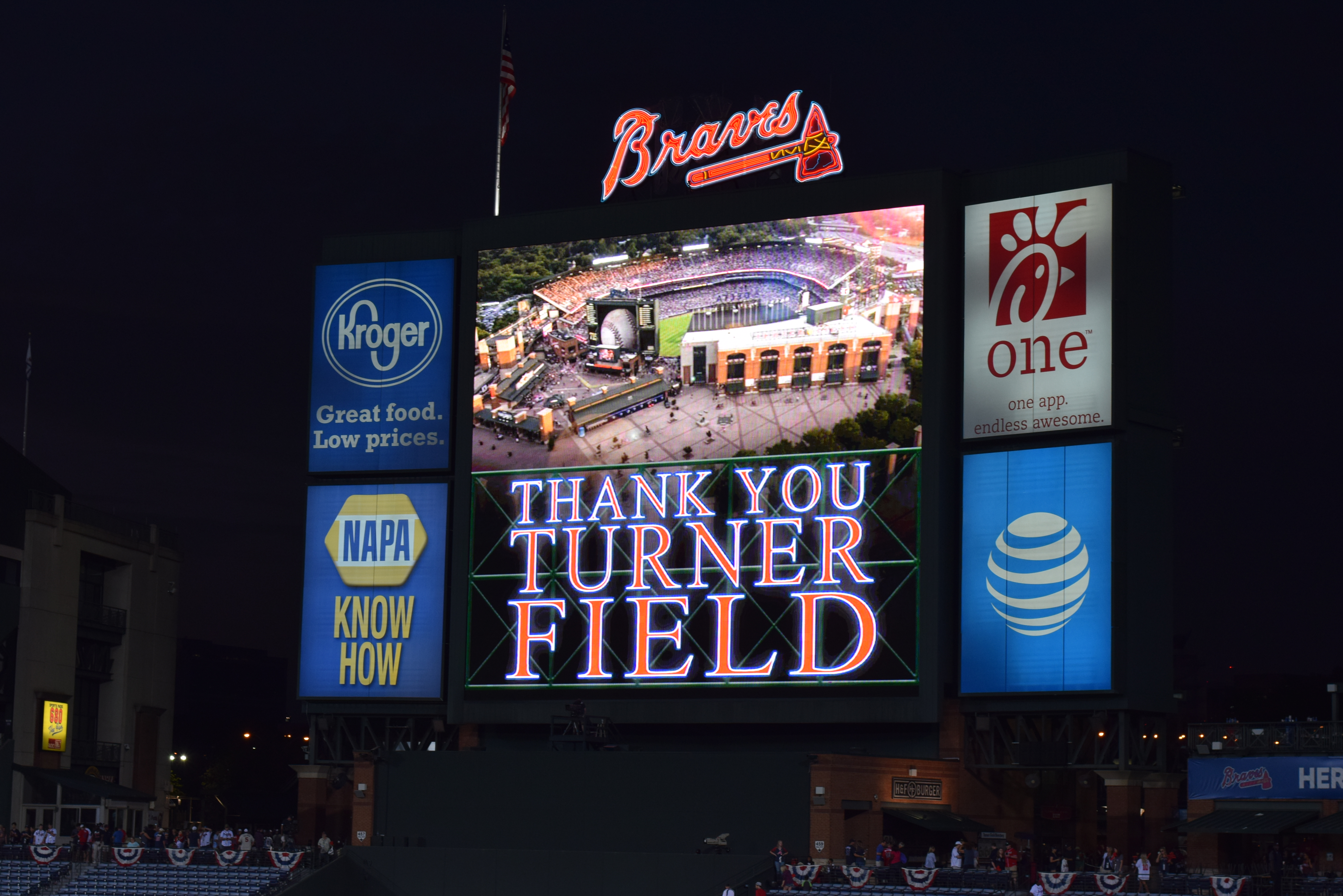
The final message displayed on the Turner Field video board after the conclusion of the final game & accompanying events.

The Braves' final game at Turner Field was a 1–0 victory on October 2, 2016, an interleague game against the Detroit Tigers that eliminated the Tigers from playoff contention; the last run was scored by Adonis Garcia off a sacrifice fly ball from Freddie Freeman, and Julio Teherán had a career-high 12 strikeouts to earn the final win at the field.

Prior to the game, the Braves unveiled their All-Turner Field Team, as chosen on the team's website by fans: catcher Javy López, first baseman Freddie Freeman, second baseman Marcus Giles, shortstop Rafael Furcal, third baseman Chipper Jones, left fielder Ryan Klesko, center fielder Andruw Jones, right fielder Brian Jordan, utility player Martin Prado, pitchers Greg Maddux, Tom Glavine, John Smoltz, Tim Hudson, and Julio Teherán, and relief pitcher Craig Kimbrel.

In a post-game ceremony, home plate was removed and delivered to SunTrust Park by Hank Aaron and Braves chairman Terry McGuirk, as those remaining at Turner Field watched its progress on the video board. While home plate was being driven up Interstate 75, the ceremony included a parade of fans representing each state in the Braves' television footprint and speeches from Braves dignitaries, followed by a simultaneous performance of the Braves' signature "Tomahawk Chop" rally cry by the crowd still at Turner Field and the small gathering of team executives and Little Leaguers at SunTrust Park.

== Description ==
=== Seating capacity ===
Years	Capacity
1996 Olympics	85,000
1997	50,528
1998–2000	49,714
2001–2007	50,096
2008–2010	49,743
2011–2016	49,586

=== Comparison with Atlanta–Fulton County Stadium ===
Characteristic	Atlanta–Fulton County Stadium	Turner Field
Opening Day	April 9, 1965	April 4, 1997
Capacity	52,769	49,586
Distance from Home Plate to:		
Backstop	59 feet 9 inches (18.21 m)	43 feet (13.11 m)
Left Field	330 feet (100.58 m)	335 feet (102.11 m)
Left Center	385 feet (117.35 m)	380 feet (115.82 m)
Center Field	402 feet (122.53 m)	400 feet (121.92 m)
Right Center	385 feet (117.35 m)	390 feet (118.87 m)
Right Field	330 feet (100.58 m)	

=== Stadium firsts ===
The first game played at Turner Field was an exhibition game against the New York Yankees on March 29, 1997; Braves starter Tom Glavine threw the first pitch, a swinging fastball strike, to Yankees shortstop Derek Jeter and the Braves won the exhibition game 2–0. The first regular season game played at Turner Field was on April 4, 1997, against the Chicago Cubs, with Denny Neagle making the start for the Braves. The Braves were losing 4–3 in the eighth inning when Chipper Jones drove in the tying run. A Michael Tucker single gave the Braves the lead as they won their first regular season game at Turner Field 5–4.

The first postseason game played at Turner Field was also during the 1997 season between the Braves and the Houston Astros in the NLDS. Starting pitcher Greg Maddux pitched a complete game, giving up only one run and leading the Braves to a 2–1 victory. Following a sweep of the Astros, the Braves went on to the NLCS, where Tom Glavine picked up the first NLCS win at Turner Field; however, the Braves lost to the eventual-World Series-champion Florida Marlins.

The first World Series game ever played at Turner Field was Game 1 of the 1999 World Series, where the starting pitcher Maddux and the Braves were defeated 4–1 by the New York Yankees' Orlando Hernández and series MVP Mariano Rivera; the Braves went on to lose the series by a four-game sweep. The only Major League Baseball All-Star Game ever to be played at Turner Field was in 2000. Atlanta's Chipper Jones hit the lone home run in the game, and Braves outfielder Andruw Jones drove in a run as the National League was defeated 6–3.

Turner Field was also home to the first NL Wild Card Game in 2012 between the Braves and St. Louis Cardinals. The Braves were behind 6–3 in the bottom of the 8th inning when Andrelton Simmons hit a fly ball to shallow left field that dropped in between Cardinals shortstop Pete Kozma and left fielder Matt Holliday. Umpire Sam Holbrook called Simmons out, citing the infield fly rule. Had an infield fly not been called, Simmons would have been credited with a single and Atlanta would have had the bases loaded with one out. Fans at Turner Field began to litter the field with debris, prompting the game to be delayed for 19 minutes. The Braves lost the game 6–3, ending their season.

Statistic	Regular season	Postseason
First game	April 4, 1997; Braves 5, Cubs 4	September 30, 1997; Braves 2, Astros 1
Ceremonial First Pitch	Ted Turner	Ernie Johnson Jr.
First pitch	Denny Neagle	Greg Maddux
First batter	Brian McRae (Cubs)	Craig Biggio (Astros)
First hit	Chipper Jones	Kenny Lofton
First home run	Michael Tucker	Ryan Klesko
First win	Brad Clontz	Greg Maddux
First save	Mark Wohlers	Robb Nen (Marlins)

=== Renovations ===
Braves Home Attendance at Turner Field
Season	Attendance	Avg./Game	NL Rank
1997	3,464,488	42,771	2nd
1998	3,360,860	41,492	3rd
1999	3,284,897	40,554	2nd
2000	3,234,304	39,930	4th
2001	2,823,530	34,858	6th
2002	2,603,484	32,142	8th
2003	2,401,084	30,393	7th
2004	2,327,565	29,399	10th
2005	2,521,167	31,126	10th
2006	2,550,524	31,488	9th
2007	2,745,207	33,891	10th
2008	2,532,834	31,270	10th
2009	2,373,631	29,304	10th
2010	2,510,119	30,989	9th
2011	2,372,940	30,037	8th
2012	2,420,171	29,879	8th
2013	2,548,679	31,465	8th
2014	2,354,305	29,065	11th
2015	2,001,392	24,709	13th
2016	2,020,914*	24,950*	12th
Source: *includes attendance (12,582) for home game played at Fort Bragg Park on July 3, 2016

Significant renovations to the stadium were put into place for the 2005 season. Among the improvements was installation of a $10 million video display, which was at the time listed by the Guinness Book of World Records as the world's largest HD video board. The video board was kept by Georgia State as part of the football stadium.

Other renovations in that year included the addition of a 1,080-foot (330-meter) long LED display to the stadium's upper deck, primarily for advertising purposes.

Turner Field's left field vista was dominated by advertising fixtures from two iconic Atlanta corporations. In 2009, a new large Coca-Cola bottle was installed behind left field. Replacing an earlier version made of various pieces of baseball equipment, the new bottle featured a HD display around the label, as well as LED lighting. Next to this second iteration of Turner Field's Coca-Cola bottle was a 40-foot (12 m) Chick-fil-A cow, added in 2008. Wearing a Braves hat, the cow did the Tomahawk Chop along with fans while holding a sign with rotating slogans which tie in to the fast-food chain's successful "Eat Mor Chikin" advertising campaign. The cow was removed from Turner Field following the 2015 season for refurbishment before being installed at Truist Park.

=== Major League Baseball stadium records ===
The highest recorded attendance for a playoff game, and overall, was 54,357 and was set on October 5, 2003, against the Chicago Cubs. The number includes standing room tickets.

The longest game by time, and in Braves history, was played on July 26–27, 2011 between the Braves and the Pittsburgh Pirates. The game lasted 6 hours and 39 minutes with the Braves winning controversially 4–3 in 19 innings. The Braves' previous longest game by time was 6:10 against the Mets on July 4, 1985, at Atlanta–Fulton County Stadium.

The most runs scored by either team in a single inning was 10, set on October 5, 2001, between the Braves and the Florida Marlins. The record was set in the 1st inning of the game. The Braves won the game 20–3.

== Accidents ==
=== 2008 ===
On May 21, 2008, during a game against the New York Mets, fan Justin Hayes was attempting to slide down the staircase railing from the club level to the field level; he slipped and fell to his death. Police later confirmed alcohol as a factor in the accident.

=== 2013 ===
On August 13, 2013, Ronald Lee Homer Jr., a fan attending the game against the Philadelphia Phillies, fell 85 feet (26 m) to his death after leaping over the fourth level wall in the rear of the stadium and landing in the player's parking lot. His death was later ruled a suicide.

=== 2015 ===
On August 29, 2015, during a game against the New York Yankees, as Alex Rodriguez was being introduced for his first plate appearance of the series, 60-year-old Greg Murrey fell 40 feet (12 m) from section 402 in the stadium's upper deck into the second and third rows of seats in section 202. He was pronounced dead on scene from his injuries. Murrey was a longtime season ticket holder and "incredibly passionate Braves fan", the team said.

== Features ==
=== Premium seating/suites ===
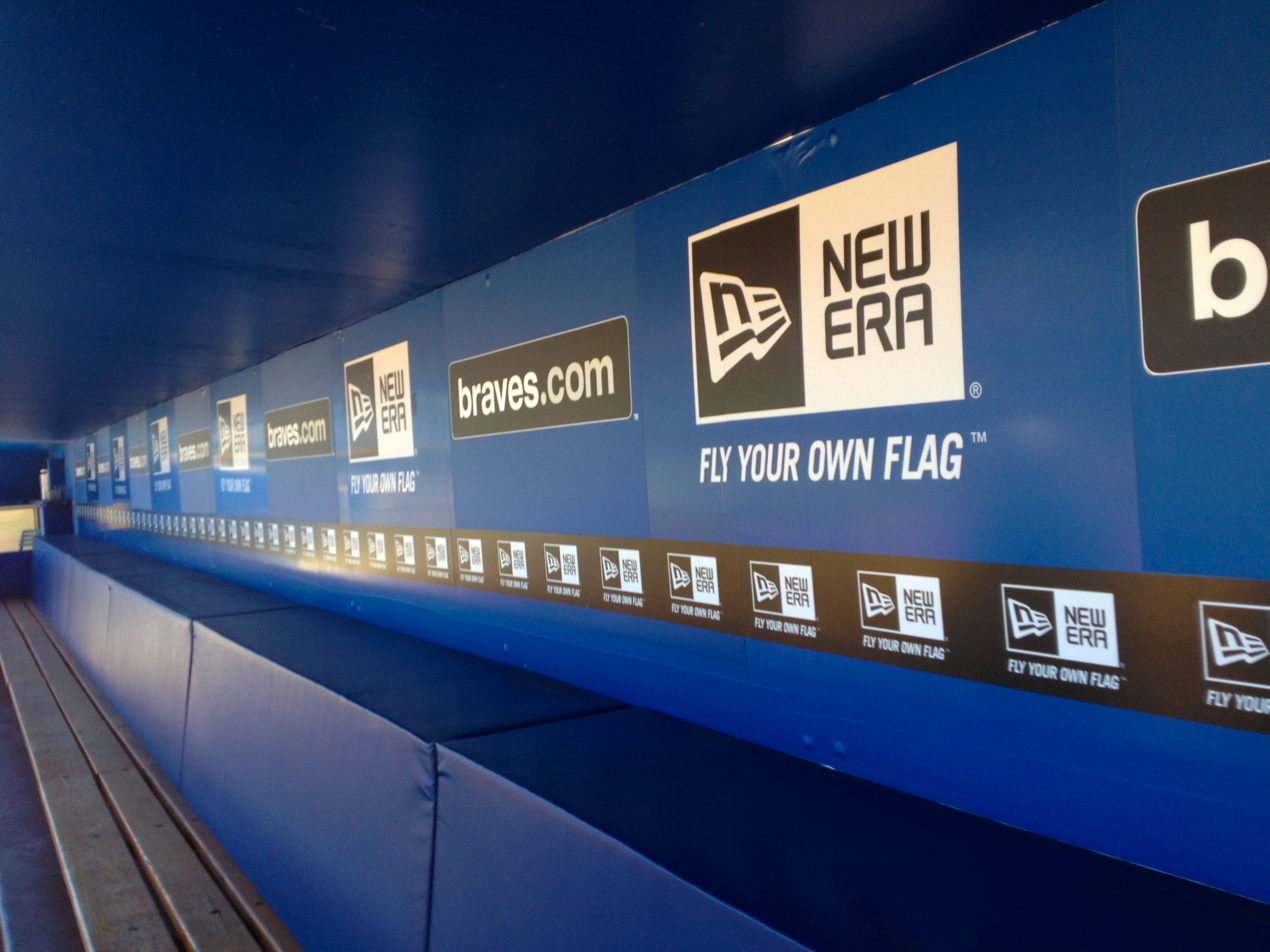
Inside the Braves dugout

Turner Field featured multiple premium seating areas and suites. The SunTrust Club was named for the bank holding company headquartered in Atlanta and was reserved for official partners and luxury clients of the ballpark. This $6 million addition was completed in 2008 and its 143 premium seats were just 43 feet (13 m) from home plate, closer than seats in any other MLB ballpark of the era (and closer to home plate than the pitcher's mound). SunTrust Club members also had access to an exclusive club area located under the Hank Aaron Seats (Section 101) that consists of free food and drinks for club members. The club area featured a waitstaff that catered to club members in their seats during the games. Members could choose to watch the games from their reserved seats, or from inside the club itself on high definition televisions.

The 755 Club (named in honor of Hank Aaron's home run record) was the stadium's predominant suite location. The club was a 24,000 square feet (2,200 m^{2}) area of space rented for special events and parties; individual suites were rented for individual games or for the entire season. The Delta Sky 360 Lounge was added in 2010 and was located behind the 755 Club suites on the second level of the ballpark. The lounge could only be accessed by members of the 755 Club. The lounge consisted of multiple premium eateries not found in the rest of the ballpark. Other Delta Sky 360 Lounges could be found at Yankee Stadium and Citi Field, and one was included in the construction of SunTrust Park. The 755 Club became the University Club as part of the Georgia State football stadium.

Turner Field also featured the Georgia's Own Credit Union Club and Superior Plumbing Club, consisting of 152 collective premium seats located directly adjacent to each side of the press box. The original club, sponsored by Georgia's Own Credit Union and featuring 80 seats, was added to the ballpark for the 2012 season and also contained multiple upscale dining options and in-seat food and beverage services. Instead of stadium seats, patrons faced the field in chairs around semicircular tables. A slightly smaller second section, sponsored by Superior Plumbing and featuring 72 seats, was added for the 2013 season on the opposite side of the press area. The Club Level was another indoor premium concourse level located on the second deck of the ballpark. This level featured multiple VIP suites that could be purchased for individual games and used for party-style affairs, among other events. For Turner Field's final few seasons, the Club Level had no title sponsor; in previous years, it was known as the Lexus Level and Golden Moon Casino Level.

=== Other areas and features ===
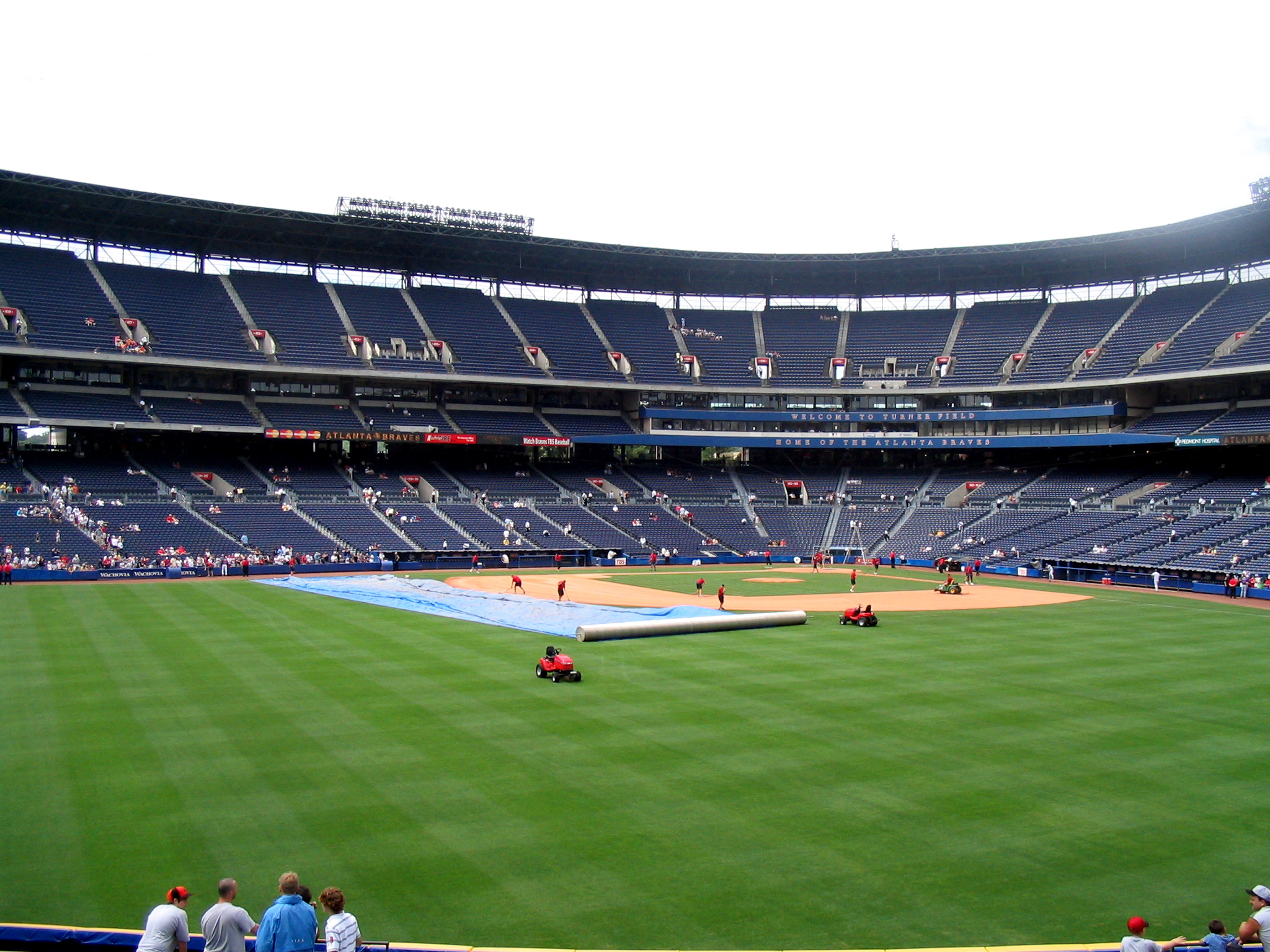
View from the outfield.

- Coca-Cola Sky Field: Along the Left Field Corner of the Upper Level and sponsored by Atlanta-based Coca-Cola, Sky Field was a large standing room area from which fans could view the game. The area contained a base path which kids can run during the games, as well as an unobstructed view of the downtown Atlanta skyline and the former Atlanta–Fulton County Stadium site. Rising above Sky Field was a giant Coca-Cola Bottle. The original bottle was designed and outfitted with baseball equipment; however, a newer "glass" bottle featuring a video screen serving as the bottle's label replaced the original during the 2009 season. Many of the pieces of the original bottle would later go on display at the World of Coca-Cola in Atlanta.
- Scouts Alley: Along the field level under the left field seating area, Scout's Alley was an area featuring interactive baseball-themed games targeted at younger fans. Games included pitching cages and batting cages. Balloon and face-painting artists were also located along Scout's Alley. Most attractions required additional payment by tokens, which were purchased at kiosks within Scouts Alley.
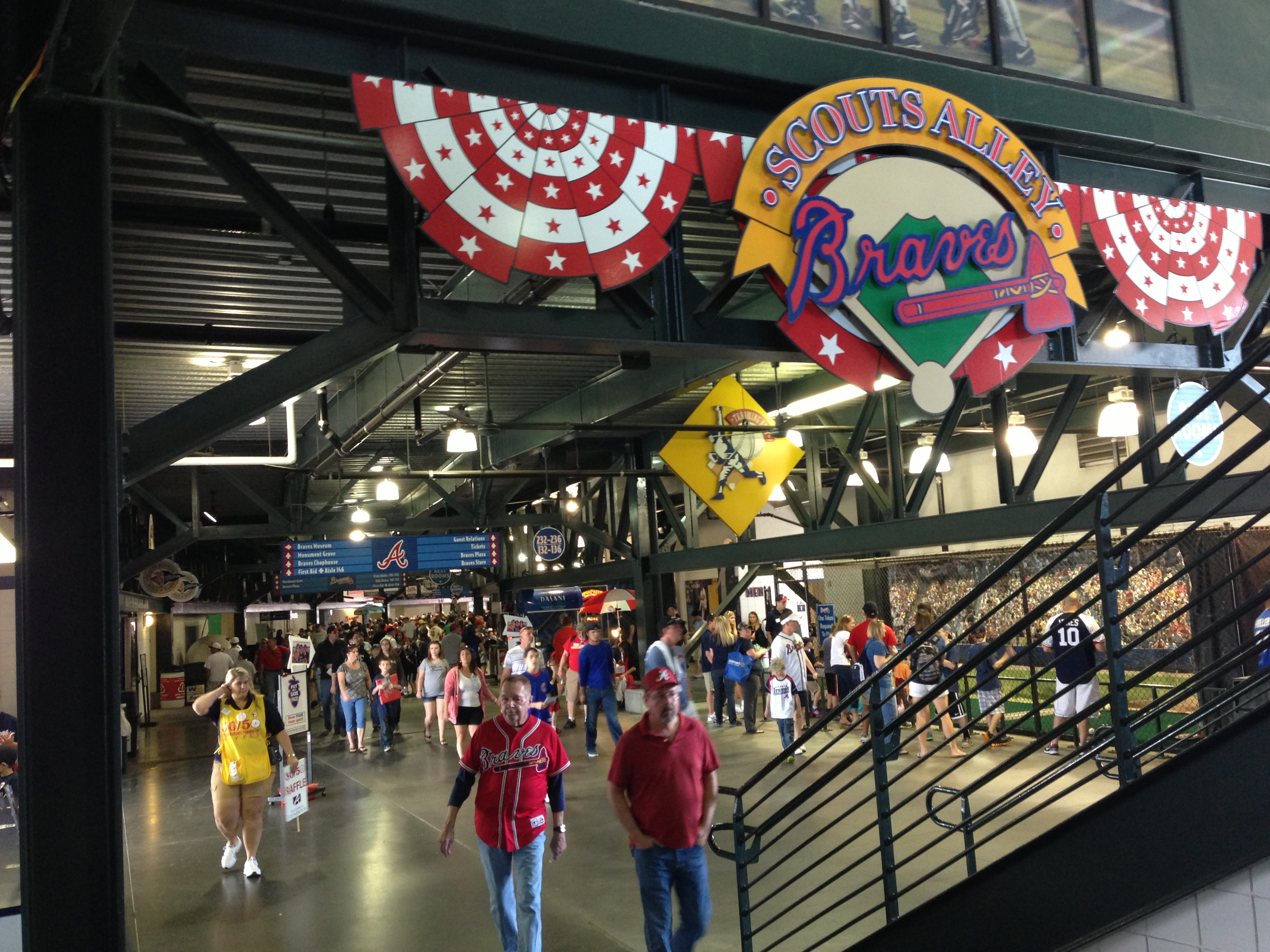
  Scouts Alley was located beneath the stadium's left field seating area.
- Ivan Allen Jr. Braves Museum and Hall of Fame: Located along the northwest side at Aisle 134 and served as the franchise's main museum. Admission to the museum and hall of fame could be purchased at the Braves ticket window. It was open year-round, and served as the starting and ending point for stadium tours, which were offered to the public on dates when the stadium was dormant and on mornings preceding night games. While the stadium was in use, the museum was featured as a Scout's Alley attraction, and was open to game ticket holders for an additional fee (paid in Scouts Alley tokens).
- Fan Plaza: Fan Plaza (sometimes called Grand Entry Plaza) served as the primary entrance and exit to the park, and was the hub of pregame and postgame activity at Turner Field. The Plaza was located directly behind centerfield and the jumbotron. The area featured the Majestic Clubhouse Store, as well as multiple dining options and drink stands, and the Family Zone (a children's interactive area, which replaced Cartoon Network's "Tooner Field" in 2012). The radio pre-game and post-game show broadcast location was also located on the Plaza. Prior to select home games, live music was performed in this area.
- Monument Grove: Located outside the gates of the ballpark, but inside the gated perimeter, near the ticket windows, was Monument Grove. Monument Grove featured statues of Braves legends Hank Aaron and Phil Niekro (as well as Georgia native Ty Cobb), the "Full Count" sculpture, a bust of Aaron, as well as the 6-foot (1.8 m) high team baseballs originally used to celebrate the 2000 All Star Game. Every Braves player with a retired number (plus Jackie Robinson) was honored with a large sculpture of the number fashioned after the font used during that player's era. The Braves Walk Of Fame was also housed here, as was the exterior entrance to the Ivan Allen Jr. Braves Museum and Hall of Fame.
- Braves Chop House: The Braves Chop House was a casual dining restaurant located behind the right-center field seats. Each table in the restaurant is placed to provide a view of the field. On the roof of the Braves Chop House was the Budweiser Pavilion party deck. The Chop House, now sponsored by Coors Light, is an integral part of the SunTrust Park design. The Turner Field Chop House became the State House Grill as part of the Georgia State re-use of the stadium.
- Skyline Tickets: Located on each end of the upper level (along the third base line in section 422L, and above right field in section 437R), the Skyline seats were available for purchase for $1 each, and went on sale at the Turner Field ticket windows 2½ hours before gametime. There was a strict policy of one ticket per person, and entry to the stadium was required immediately after purchase, in an effort to prevent ticket scalping.

== Additional events ==
=== Concerts ===
During its tenure, Turner Field was also used as a concert venue, with capacity of up to 60,000. Among the performers who performed at the stadium are the Dave Matthews Band, Metallica, Eminem, Paul McCartney and The Rolling Stones.

Date	Artist	Opening act(s)	Tour / Concert name	Attendance	Revenue	Notes
April 22, 2001	George Strait	Sara Evans; Asleep at the Wheel; Lee Ann Womack; Alan Jackson; Brad Paisley; Lonestar	George Strait Country Music Festival	—	—	
June 6, 2001	Dave Matthews Band	Angelique Kidjo; Macy Gray	—	—	—	
October 26, 2002	The Rolling Stones	No Doubt	Licks Tour	—	—	
July 11, 2003	Metallica	Limp Bizkit; Linkin Park; Deftones; Mudvayne	Summer Sanitarium Tour	—	—	
August 20, 2016	Tori Kelly	—	Unbreakable Tour	—	—	This concert is a part of the Braves Summer Concert Series presented by Coca-Cola and Delta Air Lines

=== College baseball ===
From 2003 to 2016, the NCAA baseball teams of Georgia Tech and the University of Georgia, which had previously played two games on each school's campus, replaced one of the home and home pairs in favor of a third game at Turner Field. This rivalry game at Turner Field was one of the most attended games in college baseball, with the 2004 game drawing 28,836—larger than that year's College World Series games. Proceeds from this annual match benefit Children's Healthcare of Atlanta. The annual event moved to SunTrust Park in 2017.

=== In film & TV ===
The stadium was used as a central location in many films and television series, including Flight, The Change-Up, Trouble with the Curve and the 19th season of The Amazing Race, which took place outside of the stadium.

== Panoramas ==
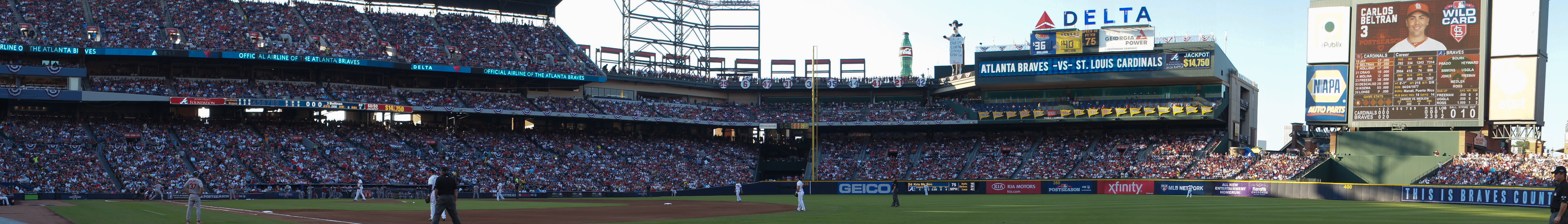
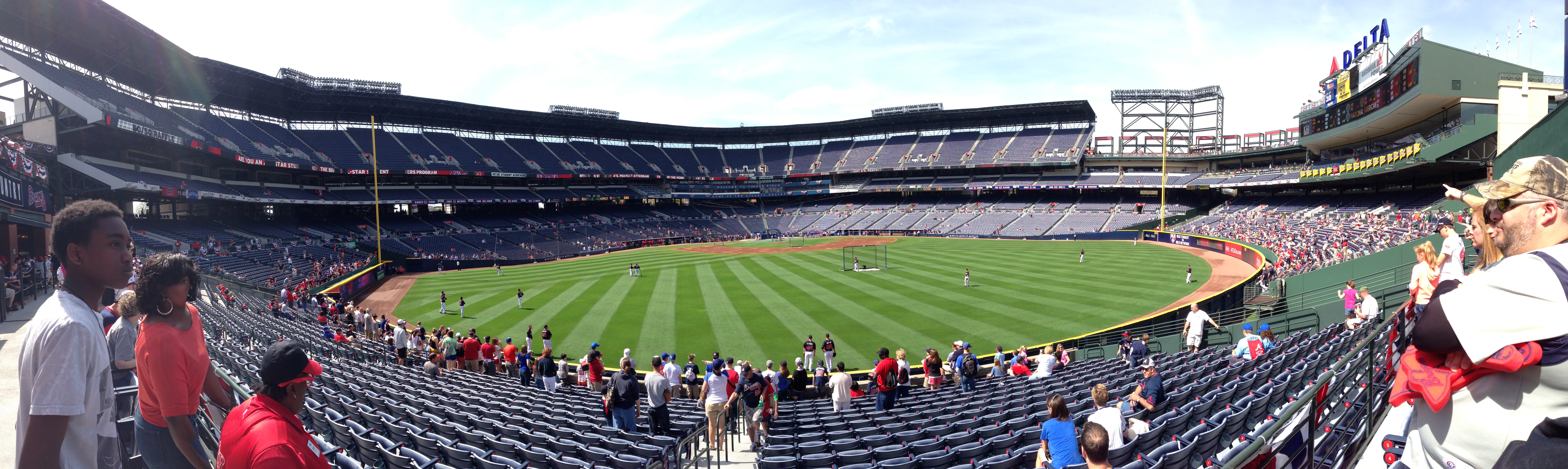

== Retired numbers ==
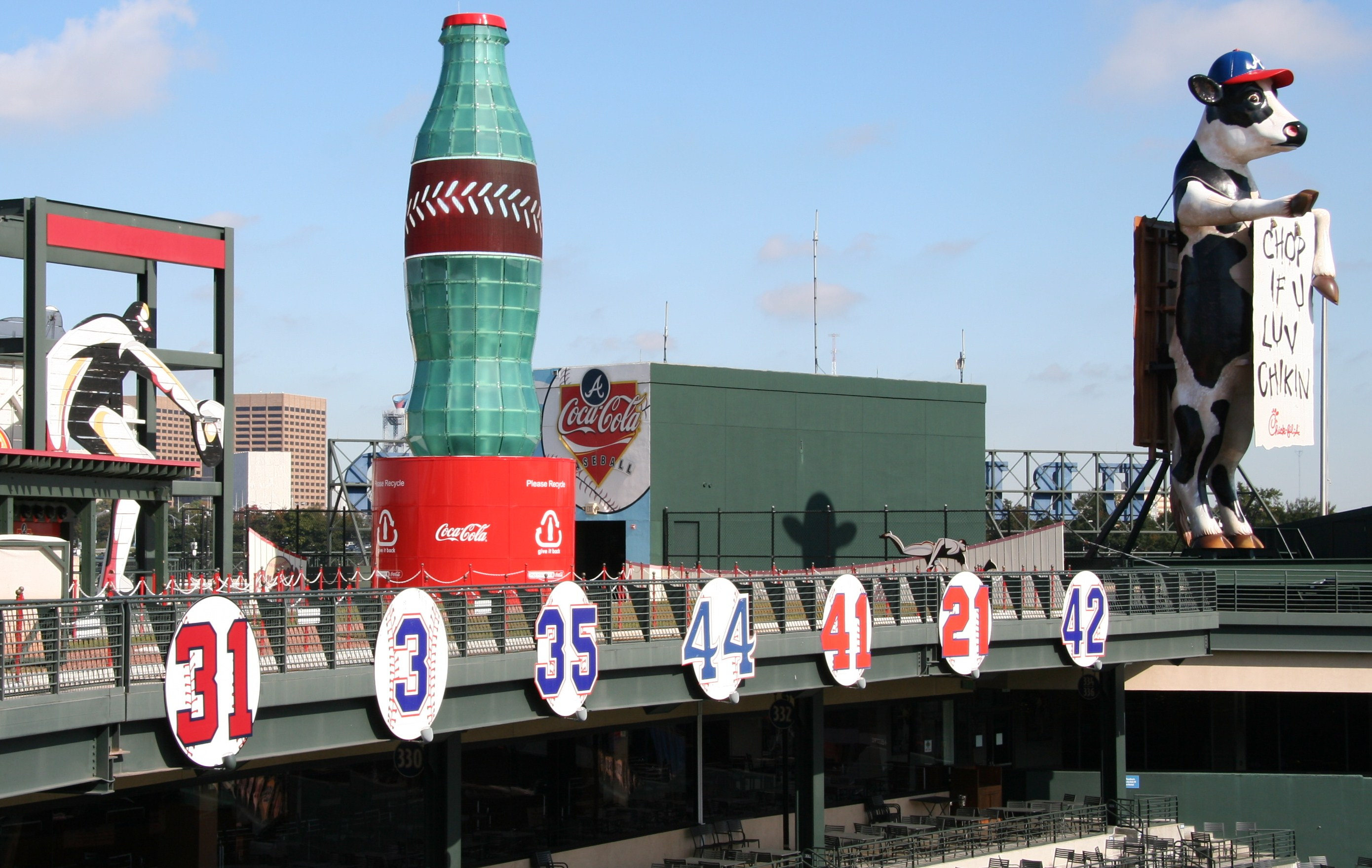
Retired numbers (removed prior to the 2013 season and replaced with markers along the terraces)

There were 11 retired numbers on display at Turner Field. The numbers were on display at the Monument Grove section of the ballpark, as well as on display inside the actual stadium. From the time of its opening in 1997 until the 2012 season, the retired numbers were commemorated by the number as pictured below hanging from the facade in left field. These were removed for the 2013 season and replaced with a modern representation of the player's first name followed by their number and last name (such as Dale 3 Murphy), which were located on the left and right sides of the club level.

Braves retired numbers
No.	Player	Position	Braves Years	Date Retired
3	Dale Murphy	OF	1976–1990	June 19, 1994
6	Bobby Cox	Manager	1978–1981; 1990–2010	August 12, 2011
10	Chipper Jones	3B, LF	1993–2012	June 28, 2013
21	Warren Spahn	P	1942, 1946–1964	December 11, 1965
29	John Smoltz	P	1988–1999; 2001–2008	June 8, 2012
31	Greg Maddux	P	1993–2003	July 17, 2009
35	Phil Niekro	P	1964–1983, 1987	August 6, 1984
41	Eddie Mathews	3B, Manager	1952–1966 (player); 1972–1974 (manager)	July 26, 1969
44	Hank Aaron	OF	1954–1974	April 15, 1977
47	Tom Glavine	P	1987–2002, 2008	August 6, 2010
42	Jackie Robinson	Retired by Major League Baseball		April 15, 1997

Of the 10 Braves whose numbers were retired prior to Turner Field's closure, nine (Spahn, Mathews, Aaron, Niekro, Cox, Maddux, Glavine, Smoltz and Jones) were elected to the National Baseball Hall of Fame, while Murphy's eligibility expired without election. Only Glavine, Jones, Maddux, and Smoltz appeared in games at Turner Field. Cox managed the team for 25 seasons in all, including its first 14 seasons in Turner Field.

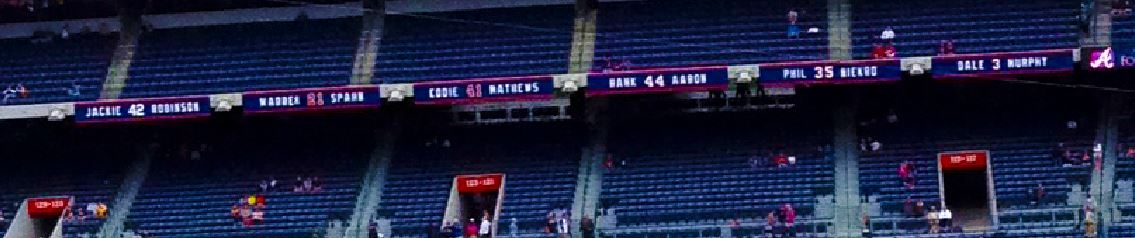
Six of the eleven retired numbers at Turner Field (2013)

Events and tenants
Preceded by Atlanta–Fulton County Stadium	Home of the Atlanta Braves; 1997–2016	Succeeded by SunTrust Park
Preceded by Fenway Park	Host of the Major League Baseball All-Star Game; 2000	Succeeded by Safeco Field
Preceded by Great American Ball Park	Host of the Civil Rights Game; 2011–2012	Succeeded by U.S. Cellular Field
