= C. Randy Taylor =

American football and basketball coach

Biographical details
- Education: Ohio State University

Playing career

Football
- 1924–1926: Tufts

Basketball
- c. 1925: Tufts

Track
- c. 1925: Tufts
- Position: Halfback (football)

Coaching career (HC unless noted)

Football
- 1927: Johnson C. Smith (assistant)
- 1928: Johnson C. Smith
- 1929–1930: Tougaloo (backfield)
- 1933: Douglass HS (OK) (assistant)
- 1934: Shaw (assistant)
- 1937–1940: Tillotson
- 1941–1942: Bluefield State
- 1947–1950: Kentucky State

Basketball
- 1928–1929: Johnson C. Smith
- 1936–1939: Tillotson

Head coaching record
- Bowls: 1–0

Claude Randolph Taylor was an American football, basketball, and track and field coach and educator. He served as the head football coach at Johnson C. Smith University in Charlotte, North Carolina, Tillotson College—now a part of Huston–Tillotson University—in Austin, Texas, Bluefield State College in Bluefield, West Virginia, and Kentucky State College for Negroes—now known as Kentucky State University—in Frankfort, Kentucky. Taylor was also the head basketball coach at Johnson C. Smith for one season, in 1928–29, tallying a mark of 6–11.

== Early life and college ==
Taylor was a native of Harlem in New York City. He attended DeWitt Clinton High School, where starred in football and track. He then matriculated at Tufts College—now known as Tufts University—where he played football and basketball and ran track, before graduating in 1927 with a Bachelor of Science degree. As a senior, he was named the school's best all-around athlete.

== Coaching and teaching career ==
In 1929, Taylor joined the coaching staff at Tougaloo College in Tougaloo, Mississippi, assisting head coach "Duke" Williams. In 1933, Taylor was hired as a science teacher at Douglass High School in Oklahoma City. He was also appointed assistant football coach under head coach L. L. McGee. The following year, he was hired at Shaw University in Raleigh, North Carolina as a biology instructor and assistant football coach under head football coach James Lytle.

Taylor served as the head football coach at Kentucky State University in Frankfort, Kentucky for four seasons, from 1947 to 1950, compiling a record of 21–16–2. After the 1950 season, he was succeeded as head football coach by Big Bertha Edwards, who had assisted Taylor as backfield coach. Taylor remained the school's track coach.

== Head coaching record ==
=== Football ===
Year	Team	Overall	Conference	Standing	Bowl/playoffs
Johnson C. Smith Golden Bulls (Independent) (1928)
1928	Johnson C. Smith	4–4			
Johnson C. Smith:		4–4			
Tillotson Eagles () (1937–1938)
1937	Tillotson				
1938	Tillotson				
Tillotson:					
Bluefield State Big Blues (Colored Intercollegiate Athletic Association) (1941–1942)
1941	Bluefield State	5–3	4–3	4th	
1942	Bluefield State	4–1–3	2–1–3	4th	
Bluefield State:		9–4–3	6–4–3		
Kentucky State Thorobreds (Midwest Athletic Association) (1947–1950)
1947	Kentucky State	4–6	3–2	3rd	
1948	Kentucky State	7–2–1	2–1–1	2nd	W Vulcan
1949	Kentucky State	6–4	2–2	3rd	
1950	Kentucky State	4–5–1	1–2	3rd	
Kentucky State:		21–17–2	8–7–1		
Total:					
