= 1945 Wilberforce Green Wave football team =

American college football season

1945 Wilberforce State Green Wave football
- Conference: Midwest Athletic Association
- Record: 6–3 (– MWAA)
- Head coach: Gaston F. Lewis (10th season)

The 1945 Wilberforce Green Wave football team was an American football team that represented Wilberforce University in the Midwest Athletic Association (MWAA) during the 1945 college football season. In its 10th season under head coach Gaston F. Lewis, the team compiled a 6–3 record and outscored opponents by a total of 177 to 85.

== Schedule ==
| Date | Opponent | Site | Result | Attendance | Source |
|---|---|---|---|---|---|
| September 29 | at Clark (GA)* | Atlanta, GA | W 8–6 | | |
| October 6 | Florida A&M* | Wilberforce, OH | L 20–26 | | |
| October 12 | vs. Tuskegee* | Chicago, IL | W 6–0 | | |
| October 19 | vs. Kentucky State | Detroit, MI | W 32–7 | | |
| October 27 | at Tennessee A&I | Nashville, TN | L 0–21 | | |
| November 3 | Lincoln (MO) | Wilberforce, OH | W 36–6 | | |
| November 10 | Godman Field* | Wilberforce, OH | L 3–7 | | |
| November 17 | at Philander Smith | Little Rock, AR | W 52–6 | | |
| November 22 | West Virginia State* | Wilberforce, OH | W 20–6 | | |
*Non-conference game
