= Henry Kean =

American sports coach (1894–1955)

Henry A. Kean
Biographical details
- Born: April 20, 1894; Kentucky, U.S.
- Died: December 12, 1955 (aged 61); Nashville, Tennessee, U.S.
- Education: Indiana University; Fisk University

Playing career

Football
- c. 1920: Fisk

Coaching career (HC unless noted)

Football
- c. 1921–1930: Central HS (KY)
- 1931–1942: Kentucky State
- 1944–1954: Tennessee A&I

Basketball
- c. 1921–1931: Central HS (KY)
- c. 1931–1944: Kentucky State
- 1944–1949: Tennessee A&I
- 1950–1951: Tennessee A&I

Track and field
- c. 1931–1944: Kentucky State

Administrative career (AD unless noted)
- 1931–1944: Kentucky State
- 1944–1955: Tennessee A&I

Head coaching record
- Overall: 165–34–9 (college football)
- Bowls: 5–3

Accomplishments and honors

Championships
- Football; 6 black college national (1934–1935, 1946–1947, 1953–1954); 11 MWAA (1932, 1934, 1937–1938, 1941–1942, 1945–1947, 1949, 1954)

Henry Arthur Kean Sr. (April 20, 1894 – December 12, 1955) was an American football and basketball coach. He served as head football coach at Kentucky State Industrial College (now known as Kentucky State University) from 1931 to 1942 and Tennessee Agricultural & Industrial State College (now known as Tennessee State University) from 1944 to 1954, compiling a career college football coaching record of 165–34–9, with a winning percentage of .819. Kean was also the head basketball coach at Tennessee A&I from 1944 to 1949 and again in 1950–51, tallying a mark of 108–26.

== Coaching career ==
=== Central High School ===
Kean taught mathematics, and coached football and basketball at Central High School in Louisville, Kentucky, for ten years. During this time he also worked a college football and college basketball official. Kean studied coaching under Knute Rockne of the University of Notre Dame.

=== Kentucky State ===
In 1931, Kean was hired as the head football coach and athletic director at Kentucky State Industrial College—now known as Kentucky State University—in Frankfort, Kentucky. He served as head coach of the Kentucky State Thorobreds football program for 12 seasons, from 1931 to 1942, compiling a record of 72–18–6 and leading his to two black college football national championships, in 1934 and 1935. Kean also coached basketball and track and field at Kentucky State.

=== Tennessee State ===
In September 1944, Kean left Kentucky State to become the athletic director and head of the department of health and physical education at Tennessee Agricultural & Industrial State College—now known as Tennessee State University. He was head coach of the Tennessee A&I Tigers football program for 11 seasons, from 1944 to 1954, tallying a mark of 93–16–3, and leading his teams to four black college football national championships.

Kean also coached basketball at Tennessee State from 1944 to 1949 and from 1950 to 1951, amassing a record of 108–26. In 1948–49, the Tigers went undefeated finishing with a record of 24 wins, scoring 1,765 points while allowing only 977 points by their opponents. This team remains Tennessee State's only undefeated team.

Kean was inducted into the Tennessee State Sports Hall of Fame in 1983. Kean Hall Gymnasium, nicknamed "Kean's Little Garden," is named in his honor.

== Personal life ==
Born in Louisville, Kentucky, Kean held college degrees from both Indiana University Bloomington and Fisk University. He died at the age of 61, on December 12, 1955, at a hospital in Nashville, Tennessee.

== Head coaching record ==
=== College football ===
Year	Team	Overall	Conference	Standing	Bowl/playoffs
Kentucky State Thorobreds (Midwest Athletic Association) (1931–1942)
1931	Kentucky State	6–3			
1932	Kentucky State	5–0–2	2–0–1	1st	
1933	Kentucky State	4–3			
1934	Kentucky State	8–0	4–0	1st	
1935	Kentucky State	9–1	3–1	2nd	W Orange Blossom Classic
1936	Kentucky State	3–3–3	1–2–1	3rd	
1937	Kentucky State	7–0	3–0	1st	
1938	Kentucky State	7–2	4–0	1st	L Orange Blossom Classic
1939	Kentucky State	6–1	3–1	2nd	
1940	Kentucky State	5–2–1			L Peach Blossom Bowl
1941	Kentucky State	6–2	3–0	1st	W Prairie View Bowl
1942	Kentucky State	6–1		1st	
Kentucky State:		72–18–6			
Tennessee A&I Tigers (Midwest Athletic Association) (1944–1954)
1944	Tennessee A&I	8–2–1			W Vulcan Bowl
1945	Tennessee A&I	8–2	3–0	1st	W Vulcan Bowl
1946	Tennessee A&I	10–1	3–0	1st	W Vulcan Bowl
1947	Tennessee A&I	10–0	3–0	1st	
1948	Tennessee A&I	5–3–1	2–2	3rd	
1949	Tennessee A&I	9–1	4–0	1st	
1950	Tennessee A&I	9–2	2–1	2nd	
1951	Tennessee A&I	8–2	2–1	2nd	
1952	Tennessee A&I	8–2	2–1	3rd	
1953	Tennessee A&I	8–0–1	2–0–1	T–1st	
1954	Tennessee A&I	10–1	4–0	1st	L National Classic
Tennessee A&I:		93–16–3			
Total:		165–34–9			
National championship Conference title Conference division title or championship game berth

== See also ==
- List of college football career coaching winning percentage leaders
