= 1948 Tennessee A&I Tigers football team =

American college football season

1948 Tennessee A&I Tigers football
- Conference: Midwest Athletic Association
- Record: 5–3–1 (2–2 MWAA)
- Head coach: Henry Kean (5th season)
- Home stadium: Sulphur Dell

1948 Midwest Athletic Association football standings
	Conf.					Overall
Team	W		L		T	W		L		T
No. 3 Wilberforce State $	3	–	0	–	0	9	–	1	–	1
No. 6 Kentucky State	2	–	1	–	1	7	–	2	–	1
Tennessee A&I	2	–	2	–	0	5	–	3	–	1
Lincoln (MO)	1	–	2	–	1	2	–	3	–	2
Louisville Municipal	0	–	3	–	0	3	–	5	–	0
$ – Conference champion; Rankings from the Pittsburgh Courier

The 1948 Tennessee A&I Tigers football team was an American football team that represented Tennessee Agricultural & Industrial State College as a member of the Midwest Athletic Association (MWAA) during the 1948 college football season. In their fifth season under head coach Henry Kean, the Tigers compiled a 5–3–1 record and outscored opponents by a total of 205 to 67.

== Schedule ==
Date	Opponent	Site	Result	Attendance	Source
September 25	at Alcorn A&M*	Alcorn, MS	W 48–0		
October 1	Langston*	Nashville, TN	W 45–0		
October 9	at Allen*	Columbia, SC	W 27–2		
October 15	West Virginia State*	Sulphur Dell; Nashville, TN	T 6–6		
October 23	vs. Wilberforce State	Griffith Stadium; Washington, DC (National Classic)	L 7–26	13,007	
October 29	North Carolina College*	Sulphur Dell; Nashville, TN	L 6–7		
November 13	Lincoln (MO)	Nashville, TN	W 32–0		
November 20	at Kentucky State	Frankfort, KY	L 0–19		
November 25	Louisville Municipal	Nashville, TN	W 34–7		
*Non-conference game
