= 1938 Tennessee State Tigers football team =

American college football season

1938 Tennessee State Tigers football
- Conference: Midwest Athletic Association
- Record: 6–1 (2–1 MWAA)
- Head coach: Reuben A. Munday (2nd season)

1938 Midwest Athletic Association football standings
	Conf.					Overall
Team	W		L		T	W		L		T
Kentucky State $	4	–	0	–	0	7	–	2	–	0
Tennessee State	2	–	1	–	0	6	–	1	–	0
Wilberforce	2	–	2	–	1	4	–	2	–	1
West Virginia State	2	–	2	–	1	3	–	4	–	1
Lincoln (MO)	2	–	3	–	0	3	–	3	–	1
Louisville Municipal	0	–	4	–	0	0	–	6	–	0
$ – Conference champion

The 1938 Tennessee State Tigers football team represented Tennessee Agricultural & Industrial State College—now known as Tennessee State University—as a member of the Midwest Athletic Association (MWAA) during the 1938 college football season. Led by Reuben A. Munday in his second and final season as head coach, the Tigers compiled an overall record of 6–1 with a mark of 2–1 conference play, placing second in the MWAA.

== Schedule ==
Date	Time	Opponent	Site	Result	Attendance	Source
October 8		Mississippi Industrial*	Nashville, TN	W 27–0		
October 15	2:00 p.m.	Johnson C. Smith*	Nashville, TN	W 9–0		
October 29		Wilberforce	Nashville, TN	W 13–0	3,000	
November 5		Alabama A&M*	Nashville, TN	W 26–0		
November 12		West Virginia State	Nashville, TN	W 13–2		
November 19		at Lincoln (MO)	Jefferson City, MO	L 0–7		
November 24	2:30 p.m.	Lane*^{†}	Nashville, TN	W 2–0	4,000	
*Non-conference game; ^{†}Homecoming; All times are in Central time
