= 1947 Kentucky State Thorobreds football team =

American college football season

1947 Kentucky State Thorobreds football
- Conference: Midwest Athletic Association
- Record: 4–6 (3–2 MWAA)
- Head coach: C. Randy Taylor (1st season)
- Home stadium: Alumni Field

1947 Midwest Athletic Association football standings
	Conf.					Overall
Team	W		L		T	W		L		T
No. 1 Tennessee A&I $	3	–	0	–	0	10	–	0	–	0
No. 2 Wilberforce State	3	–	1	–	0	11	–	1	–	0
No. 22 Kentucky State	3	–	2	–	0	4	–	6	–	0
No. 13 Lincoln (MO)	1	–	3	–	0	3	–	4	–	1
Philander Smith	0	–	2	–	0	1	–	9	–	1
Wilberforce	0	–	2	–	0	0	–	6	–	1
No. 12 Louisville Municipal *			–			6	–	1	–	1
$ – Conference champion; * – On probation; Rankings from the Pittsburgh Courier using the Dickinson Ratings System.

The 1947 Kentucky State Thorobreds football team was an American football team that represented Kentucky State Industrial College (now known as Kentucky State University) as a member of the Midwest Athletic Association (MWAA) during the 1947 college football season. In its first season under head coach C. Randy Taylor, the team compiled a 4–6 record (3–2 against conference opponents) and outscored all opponents by a total of 174 to 112. The team was ranked No. 22 among the nation's black college football teams according to the Pittsburgh Courier and its Dickinson Rating System. The team played its home games at Alumni Field in Frankfort, Kentucky.

== Schedule ==
Date	Opponent	Site	Result	Attendance	Source
September 27	Philander Smith	Alumni Field; Frankfort, KY	W 57–0		
October 4	at Wilberforce State	League Park; Cleveland, OH	L 6–34	8,000	
October 11	West Virginia State*	Alumni Field; Frankfort, KY	L 9–13		
October 18	Lincoln (MO)	Alumni Field; Frankfort, KY	W 19–12	5,000	
October 25	Wilberforce	Wilberforce, OH	W 46–0		
November 1	Florida A&M*	Alumni Field; Frankfort, KY	L 12–14		
November 8	at Louisville Municipal*	Central High School Athletic Field; Louisville, KY	L 0–6	> 4,000	
November 15	Morris Brown*	Alumni Field; Frankfort, KY	W 12–0		
November 22	at Bluefield State*	Bluefield, WV	L 0–12		
November 27	at Tennessee A&I	Nashville, TN	L 13–20		
*Non-conference game
