= Reuben A. Munday =

American football coach, agriculturalist (1900–1972)

Biographical details
- Born: February 10, 1900; Berea, Kentucky, U.S.
- Died: July 18, 1972 (aged 72); Tuskegee, Alabama, U.S.

Playing career
- c. 1927: Hampton

Coaching career (HC unless noted)
- c. 1929–1936: Tuskegee (line)
- 1937–1938: Tennessee State

Head coaching record
- Overall: 9–2–1

Reuben Alexander Munday (February 10, 1900 – July 18, 1972) was an American college football coach and agriculturalist. He served as head football coach at Tennessee A&I State College—now known as Tennessee State University—in Nashville, Tennessee, for two seasons, from 1937 to 1938, compiling a record of 9–2–1.

Munday earned a Bachelor of Science degree in agriculture from Hampton Institute (now known as Hampton University) and a Master of Science degree from Iowa State College of Agriculture and Mechanic Arts (now known as Iowa State University). At Hampton, he earned letter in football. In 1929, he began working at the Tuskegee Institute—now known as Tuskegee University—heading the poultry division. From 1937 to 1940, he was director of agriculture at Tennessee A&I, before returning to Tuskegee as acting director of the School of Agriculture. At Tuskegee, he served as line coach for the football team under head football coach Cleve Abbott.

Munday died on July 12, 1972, at a hospital in Tuskegee, Alabama.

== Head coaching record ==
Year	Team	Overall	Conference	Standing	Bowl/playoffs
Tennessee State Tigers (Midwest Athletic Association) (1937–1938)
1937	Tennessee State	3–1–1	2–1–1	T–2nd	
1938	Tennessee State	6–1	2–1	2nd	
Tennessee State:		9–2–1	4–3–1		
Total:		9–2–1			
