= Gaston F. Lewis =

American baseball player and football, basketball, track, and cross country coach

Biographical details
- Born: August 4, 1903; Clinton County, Ohio, U.S.
- Died: November 28, 1989 (aged 86); Xenia, Ohio, U.S.

Playing career

Football
- c. 1925: Wilberforce

Basketball
- c. 1925: Wilberforce

Baseball
- c. 1925: Wilberforce

Track
- c. 1925: Wilberforce

Coaching career (HC unless noted)

Football
- 1926–1928: Alabama State (assistant)
- 1929–1933: Alabama State
- 1934: Wilberforce
- 1935–1937: Wilberforce (assistant)
- 1938–1946: Wilberforce
- 1947–1956: Wilberforce State / Central State (OH)

Basketball
- 1934–?: Wilberforce

Track
- 1934–?: Wilberforce

Administrative career (AD unless noted)
- 1957–1969: Central State (OH)

Head coaching record
- Overall: 123–65–12 (football)
- Bowls: 4–1–1

Accomplishments and honors

Championships
- Football; 1 Black college national (1948); 3 MWAA (1939–1940, 1948, 1950–1951)

Gaston Lewis
- Pitcher
- Threw: Left

Negro league baseball debut
- 1922, for the Bacharach Giants

Last appearance
- 1926, for the Dayton Marcos

Teams
- Bacharach Giants (1922); Dayton Marcos (1926)

Gaston Frederick "Country" Lewis (August 4, 1903 – November 28, 1989) was an American Negro league baseball player and a college football, college basketball, track, and cross country coach. He served as the head football coach at Alabama State University (1929–1933), Wilberforce University (1934, 1938–1946), and Central State University in Wilberforce, Ohio (1947–1956).

== Biography ==
A native of Clinton County, Ohio, Lewis grew up on a farm in Caesarscreek Township, Greene County, Ohio, graduated from Wilberforce University, and earned a master's degree at Ohio State University. He played for the Bacharach Giants in 1922 and for the Dayton Marcos in 1926.

Lewis joined the coaching staff at Alabama's Normal School for Colored Students—now known as Alabama State University–as an assistant in 1926, under head coach Bertrand C. Jacobs. In 1935, Lewis was succeeded as head football coach at Wilberforce by Hank Corrothers, but remained as an assistant coach for the team. After the resignation of James McCrary in 1938, Lewis was once again appointed head coach of the team.

Lewis served as the manager of the track and field competition at the 1967 Pan American Games, and was an assistant track and field coach for the 1968 United States Olympic team. Lewis died in Xenia, Ohio in 1989 at age 86.

== Head coaching record ==
=== Football ===
Year	Team	Overall	Conference	Standing	Bowl/playoffs
Alabama State Hornets (Southern Intercollegiate Athletic Conference) (1929–1933)
1929	Alabama State	5–2–2			
1930	Alabama State	6–5	3–3	6th	
1931	Alabama State	8–3	4–1	3rd	
1932	Alabama State	6–1–1	2–1–1	T–4th	
1933	Alabama State	6–2–1			
Alabama State:		31–13–4			
Wilberforce Green Wave (Midwest Athletic Association) (1934)
1934	Wilberforce	6–3			
Wilberforce Green Wave (Midwest Athletic Association) (1938)
1938	Wilberforce	4–2–1	2–2–1	T–3rd	
1939	Wilberforce	5–2	4–1	1st	
1940	Wilberforce	6–1–2		1st	T Orange Blossom Classic, L Vulcan
1941	Wilberforce	3–4	2–2	T–2nd	
1942	No team—World War II				
1943	No team—World War II				
1944	Wilberforce	4–3–1			
1945	Wilberforce	6–3			
1946	Wilberforce	5–2–2	2–1–1	T–2nd	
Wilberforce:		39–20–6			
Wilberforce State Green Wave / Central State Marauders (Midwest Athletic Association) (1947–1956)
1947	Wilberforce State	10–1	3–1	3rd	W Fruit, W Vulcan
1948	Wilberforce State	9–1–1	3–0	1st	W Prairie View
1949	Wilberforce State	5–4	2–1	2nd	
1950	Wilberforce State	6–4	3–0	1st	W Orange Blossom Classic
1951	Wilberforce State	7–2	3–0	1st	
1952	Central State	4–4	1–2	5th	
1953	Central State	1–5	0–3	T–6th	
1954	Central State	4–4	1–2	5th	
1955	Central State	4–4	0–3	T–5th	
1956	Central State	4–3–1	1–1–1	T–2nd	
Wilberforce State / Central State:		53–32–2	17–12–1		
Total:		123–65–12			
National championship Conference title Conference division title or championship game berth
