= 1937 Kentucky State Thorobreds football team =

American college football season

1937 Kentucky State Thorobreds football

MWAA champion
- Conference: Midwest Athletic Association
- Record: 7–0 (3–0 MWAA)
- Head coach: Henry Kean (7th season)
- Captain: Big Bertha Edwards
- Home stadium: Alumni Field

1937 Midwest Athletic Association football standings
	Conf.					Overall
Team	W		L		T	W		L		T
Kentucky State $	3	–	0	–	0	7	–	0	–	0
Tennessee State	2	–	1	–	1	3	–	1	–	1
Lincoln (MO)	2	–	1	–	2	2	–	2	–	2
Wilberforce	2	–	2	–	1	4	–	2	–	1
West Virginia State	2	–	3	–	0	3	–	3	–	1
Louisville Municipal	0	–	4	–	0	0	–	6	–	1
$ – Conference champion

The 1937 Kentucky State Thorobreds football team represented Kentucky State Industrial College (KISC)—now known as Kentucky State University—as a member of the Midwest Athletic Association (MWAA) during the 1937 college football season. Led by seventh-year head coach Henry Kean, the Thorobreds compiled a perfect overall record of 7–0 with a mark of 3–0 in conference play, winning the MWAA title.

== Schedule ==
Date	Time	Opponent	Site	Result	Attendance	Source
October 2		Bluefield State*	Alumni Field; Frankfort, KY	W 28–0		
October 9		at Wilberforce	Wilberforce, OH	W 18–0		
October 16		Lincoln (MO)^{†}	Frankfort, KY	W 14–0	3,500	
October 23		at Tuskegee*	Alumni Bowl; Tuskegee, AL	W 26–0		
October 29	8:00 p.m.	vs. Alabama State*	Legion Field; Birmingham, AL	W 51–0		
November 6		West Virginia State	Alumni Field; Frankfort, KY	W 41–6		
November 13	2:00 p.m.	LeMoyne	Alumni Field; Frankfort, KY	W 31–7	3,000	
November 25	2:00 p.m.	at Tennessee State	Nashville, TN	Cancelled		
*Non-conference game; ^{†}Homecoming; All times are in Central time
