= David Abner =

American politician

David Abner Sr.
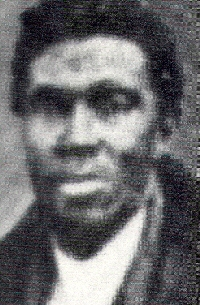

Texas State Representative for District 5 (Harrison and Rusk counties)
- In office January 13, 1874 – March 15, 1875

Personal details
- Born: c. 1826 Selma, Alabama, U.S.
- Died: 1902 (aged 75–76) Marshall, Texas, U.S.
- Party: Republican
- Children: David Abner Jr.
- Profession: Politician, farmer, educator

David Abner Sr. (c. 1826–1902) was an American politician who served in the Texas House of Representatives.

Born into slavery in Selma, Alabama, he served in the Fourteenth Texas Legislature for District 5 and sat on the Education Committee. He was a delegate to the 1875 Texas Constitutional Convention.

== Early life ==
At the age of seventeen, Abner in 1843 was taken to Upshur County in East Texas. After being emancipated after the American Civil War, he moved to Marshall in Harrison County, also in East Texas. There, he rented a plot of land and a mule from the sister of his original master. A few years later, he purchased the farm and became wealthy.

== Political life ==
In 1873, Abner was appointed to the executive committee of the first Colored Men's State Convention. Later, he was elected to the position of treasurer for Harrison County. In 1874, Abner was elected to the legislature for Harrison and Rusk counties and a councilman in the Texas House of Councils.

Halfway through his term in the state House, in August 1875, a convention was called to rewrite the 1869 Texas State Constitution. Abner was one of three delegates elected to the convention from the Texas State Senate district that comprised Harison and Rusk counties. He was the only Republican at the convention who voted for a clause in the state constitution that prohibited the state from spending money for the encouragement of immigration.^{a}

After his state legislative term, Abner was the vice president of the Republican State Convention in 1876.

== After politics ==
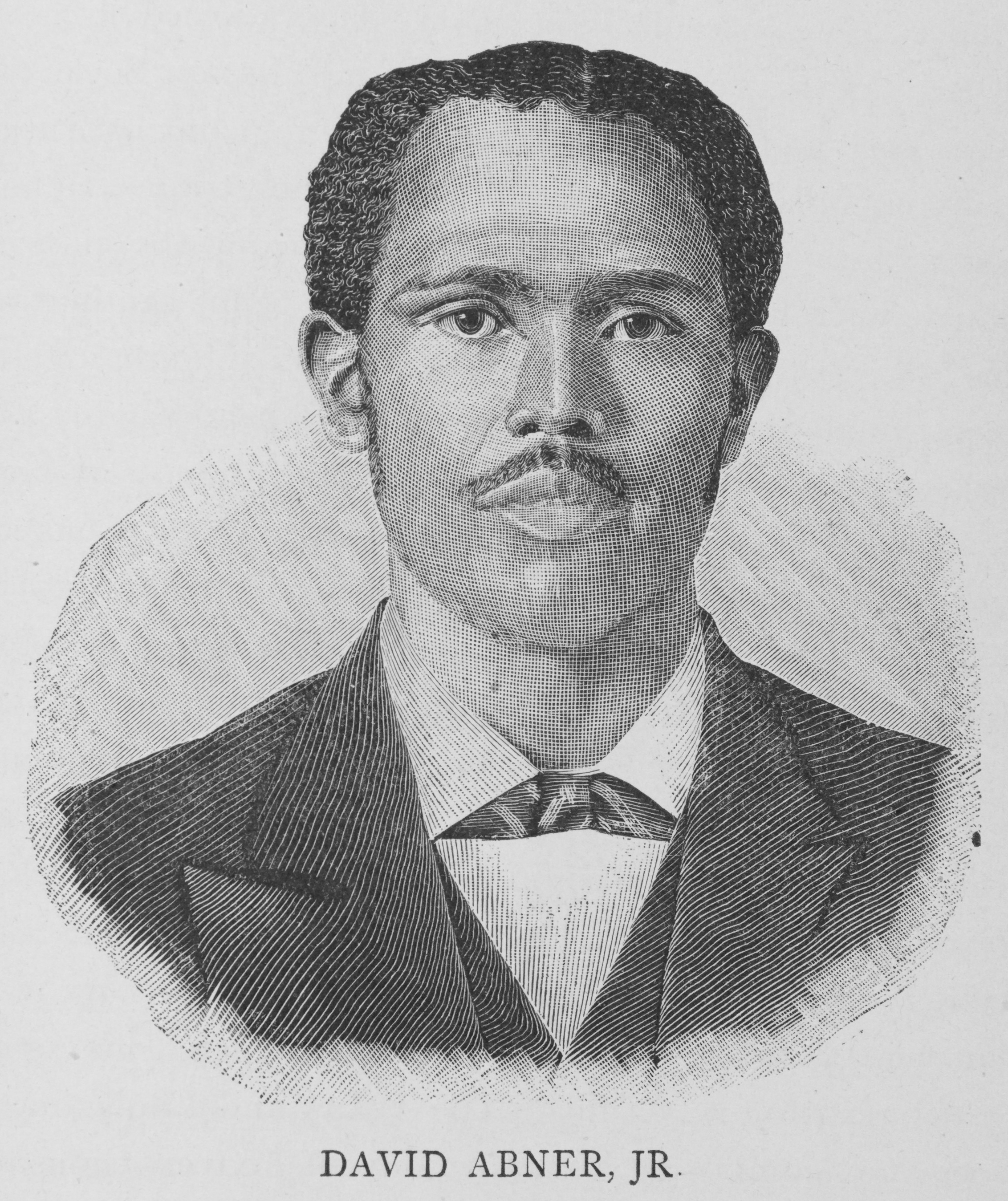
Son, David Abner Jr.

In 1881, Abner helped establish Bishop College, and served as one of its first trustees. In 1884, his son David Abner Jr., became the first black man to graduate from a Texas college, and later became president of Guadalupe College and then of Conroe College.

Abner died in 1902 in Marshall, Texas, and is interred there at a family cemetery.

== Notes ==
- ^a Article 16, section 56 of the Texas State Constitution states: "The Legislature shall have no power to appropriate any of the public money for the establishment and maintenance of a bureau of immigration, or for any purpose of bringing immigrants to this State." It was part of the Constitution from 1875 until repealed in 2001.
