= 1947 Louisville Municipal Bantams football team =

American college football season

1947 Louisville Municipal Bantams football
- Conference: Midwest Athletic Association
- Record: 6–1–1 (0–0–0 MWAA)
- Head coach: Dwight T. Reed (2nd season)

1947 Midwest Athletic Association football standings
	Conf.					Overall
Team	W		L		T	W		L		T
No. 1 Tennessee A&I $	3	–	0	–	0	10	–	0	–	0
No. 2 Wilberforce State	3	–	1	–	0	11	–	1	–	0
No. 22 Kentucky State	3	–	2	–	0	4	–	6	–	0
No. 13 Lincoln (MO)	1	–	3	–	0	3	–	4	–	1
Philander Smith	0	–	2	–	0	1	–	9	–	1
Wilberforce	0	–	2	–	0	0	–	6	–	1
No. 12 Louisville Municipal			–			6	–	1	–	1
$ – Conference champion; * – On probation; Rankings from the Pittsburgh Courier using the Dickinson Ratings System.

The 1947 Louisville Municipal Bantams football team was an American football team that represented Louisville Municipal College (now part of University of Louisville) in the Midwest Athletic Association (MWAA) during the 1947 college football season. In their second season under head coach Dwight T. Reed, the Bantams compiled a 6–1–1 record and was ranked No. 12 among the nation's black college football teams according to the Pittsburgh Courier and its Dickinson Rating System. Louisville Municipal was on a one-year probation in the MWAA, and its game did not count in the conference standings.

== Schedule ==
Date	Opponent	Site	Result	Attendance	Source
September 26	at Fisk*	Sulphur Dell; Nashville, TN	W 14–7		
October 4	Lincoln (MO)*	Louisville, KY	T 0–0		
October 11	at Bluefield State*	Bluefield, WV	W 14–7		
October 18	at Philander Smith*	Little Rock, AR	W 20–7		
October 24	at Morristown*	Burke-Toney Stadium; Morristown, TN	W 33–0		
November 1	Lane*^{†}	Central Stadium; Louisville, KY	L 13–19	3,000	
November 8	Kentucky State*	Central HS Athletic Field; Louisville, KY	W 6–0	> 4,000	
November 14	at Miles*	Bessemer Stadium; Birmingham, AL	W 14–13	2,000	
*Non-conference game; ^{†}Homecoming
