= 1937 Tennessee State Tigers football team =

American college football season

1937 Tennessee State Tigers football
- Conference: Midwest Athletic Association
- Record: 3–1–1 (2–1–1 MWAA)
- Head coach: Reuben A. Munday (1st season)

1937 Midwest Athletic Association football standings
	Conf.					Overall
Team	W		L		T	W		L		T
Kentucky State $	3	–	0	–	0	7	–	0	–	0
Tennessee State	2	–	1	–	1	3	–	1	–	1
Lincoln (MO)	2	–	1	–	2	2	–	2	–	2
Wilberforce	2	–	2	–	1	4	–	2	–	1
West Virginia State	2	–	3	–	0	3	–	3	–	1
Louisville Municipal	0	–	4	–	0	0	–	6	–	1
$ – Conference champion

The 1937 Tennessee State Tigers football team represented Tennessee Agricultural & Industrial State College—now known as Tennessee State University—as a member of the Midwest Athletic Association (MWAA) during the 1937 college football season. Led by first-year head coach Reuben A. Munday, the Tigers compiled an overall record of 3–1–1 with a mark of 2–1–1 conference play, tying for second place in the MWAA.

== Schedule ==
Date	Time	Opponent	Site	Result	Source
October 16		Mississippi Industrial*	Nashville, TN	W 38–0	
October 30		at Wilberforce	Wilberforce, OH	W 6–3	
November 6		Louisville Municipal^{†}	Nashville, TN	W 29–0	
November 13		at West Virginia State	Institute, WV	L 0–6	
November 20		Lincoln (MO)	Nashville, TN	T 0–0	
November 25	2:00 p.m.	Kentucky State	Nashville, TN	Cancelled	
*Non-conference game; ^{†}Homecoming; All times are in Central time
