= 1947 Wilberforce State Green Wave football team =

American college football season

1947 Wilberforce State Green Wave football

Fruit Bowl, W 26–0 vs. Prairie View A&M Vulcan Bowl, W 27–21 vs. Grambling
- Conference: Midwest Athletic Association
- Record: 11–1 (3–1 MWAA)
- Head coach: Gaston F. Lewis (12th season)

1947 Midwest Athletic Association football standings
	Conf.					Overall
Team	W		L		T	W		L		T
No. 1 Tennessee A&I $	3	–	0	–	0	10	–	0	–	0
No. 2 Wilberforce State	3	–	1	–	0	11	–	1	–	0
No. 22 Kentucky State	3	–	2	–	0	4	–	6	–	0
No. 13 Lincoln (MO)	1	–	3	–	0	3	–	4	–	1
Philander Smith	0	–	2	–	0	1	–	9	–	1
Wilberforce	0	–	2	–	0	0	–	6	–	1
No. 12 Louisville Municipal *			–			6	–	1	–	1
$ – Conference champion; * – On probation; Rankings from the Pittsburgh Courier using the Dickinson Ratings System.

The 1947 Wilberforce State Green Wave football team was an American football team that represented Wilberforce State College of Education (now known as Central State University) in the Midwest Athletic Association (MWAA) during the 1947 college football season. In its 12th season under head coach Gaston F. Lewis, the team compiled a 11–1 record and all outscored opponents by a total of 415 to 79.

Wilberforce State was ranked No. 2 among the nation's black college football teams according to the Pittsburgh Courier and its Dickinson Rating System. The team's only defeat was against Tennessee A&I, the team selected by the Courier as the 1947 national champion.

Key players on the 1947 Wilberforce State team included halfbacks Walt Sellers and Carl Baylor, quarterbacks Freddie Hall and Michael "Mickey" Carter, and end Blake White.

Prior to the start of the 1947–48 academic year, the State of Ohio withdrew support from the church-supported portion of the school. The two portions of the school then split and fielded separate football teams with different coaches. Lewis, who had been the coach at Wilberforce since 1934, took responsibility for coaching the state school, and Dwight Fisher coached the religious school.

== Schedule ==
Date	Opponent	Site	Result	Attendance	Source
September 27	at North Carolina A&T*	Greensboro, NC	W 9–7	8,000	
October 4	vs. Kentucky State	League Park; Cleveland, OH	W 34–6	8,000	
October 10	vs. Tuskegee*	Comiskey Park; Chicago, IL	W 20–6	25,000	
October 18	Wright Field*	Wilberforce Stadium; Xenia, OH	W 101–0		
October 24	at Tennessee A&I	Sulphur Dell; Nashville, TN	L 7–14		
November 1	Lincoln (MO)	Wilberforce Stadium; Xenia, OH	W 32–6		
November 8	Delaware State*	Wilberforce Stadium; Xenia, OH	W 31–0		
November 15	at Philander Smith	Hot Springs, AR	W 57–7		
November 22	West Virginia State*	Wilberforce Stadium; Xenia, OH	W 31–0	3,000	
November 29	vs. Bergen Junior College*	Polo Grounds; New York, NY	W 40–12	13,000–16,000	
December 14	vs. Prairie View A&M*	Kezar Stadium; San Francisco, CA (Fruit Bowl)	W 26–0	10,000	
January 1, 1948	vs. Grambling*	Rickwood Field; Birmingham, AL (Vulcan Bowl)	W 27–21	8,500	
*Non-conference game
