= 1945 Tennessee A&I Tigers football team =

American college football season

1945 Tennessee A&I Tigers football

MWAA champion

Derby Bowl, W 45–24 vs. Godman Field Vulcan Bowl, W 33–6 vs. Texas College
- Conference: Midwest Athletic Association
- Record: 9–2 (3–0 MWAA)
- Head coach: Henry Kean (2nd season)
- Home stadium: Sulphur Dell, Tennessee State Stadium

The 1945 Tennessee A&I Tigers football team represented Tennessee Agricultural & Industrial State College as a member of the Midwest Athletic Association (MWAA) during the 1945 college football season. In their second season under head coach Henry Kean, the Tigers compiled a 9–2 record (3–0 against conference opponents), won the MWAA championship, defeated Texas College in the Vulcan Bowl, and outscored opponents by a total of 335 to 69. The team played its home games at Tennessee State Stadium and Sulphur Dell in Nashville, Tennessee.

== Schedule ==
Date	Time	Opponent	Site	Result	Attendance	Source
September 29		Fort Benning*	Nashville, TN	W 32–0		
October 6		vs. Langston*	Page Stadium; Oklahoma City, OK	L 0–13	3,500	
October 13		Philander Smith*	Nashville, TN	W 87–0		
October 18	7:00 p.m.	at Clark (GA)*	Ponce de Leon Park; Atlanta, GA	W 21–0		
October 27		Wilberforce	Nashville, TN	W 21–0		
November 3		vs. Florida A&M*	Jacksonville Stadium; Jacksonville, FL	L 18–20		
November 10		Southern*	Nashville, TN	W 33–0		
November 17		at Lincoln (MO)	Jefferson City, MO	W 36–6	4,000	
November 29		Kentucky State	Nashville, TN	W 9–0	4,000	
December 8		Godman Field*	Louisville, KY (Derby Bowl)	W 45–24	2,500	
January 1, 1946		vs. Texas College*	Rickwood Field; Birmingham, AL (Vulcan Bowl)	W 33–6	9,000	
*Non-conference game; All times are in Central time
