= 1948 Wilberforce State Green Wave football team =

American college football season

1948 Wilberforce State Green Wave football

MAA champion

Fish Bowl, L 19–20 at Hampton Prairie View Bowl, W 6–0 at Prairie View A&M
- Conference: Midwest Athletic Association
- Record: 9–1–1 (3–0 MAA)
- Head coach: Gaston F. Lewis (13th season)

1948 Midwest Athletic Association football standings
	Conf.					Overall
Team	W		L		T	W		L		T
No. 3 Wilberforce State $	3	–	0	–	0	9	–	1	–	1
No. 6 Kentucky State	2	–	1	–	1	7	–	2	–	1
Tennessee A&I	2	–	2	–	0	5	–	3	–	1
Lincoln (MO)	1	–	2	–	1	2	–	3	–	2
Louisville Municipal	0	–	3	–	0	3	–	5	–	0
$ – Conference champion; Rankings from the Pittsburgh Courier

The 1948 Wilberforce State Green Wave football team was an American football team that represented Wilberforce State University—now known as Central State University– in the Midwest Athletic Association (MAA) during the 1948 college football season. In its 13th season under head coach Gaston F. Lewis, the team compiled a 9–1–1 record, won the MAA championship, and was defeated by Hampton in the Fish Bowl, but defeated Prairie View A&M in the Prairie View Bowl, and all outscored opponents by a total of 237 to 61.

== Schedule ==
Date	Opponent	Site	Result	Attendance	Source
September 25	North Carolina A&T*	Wilberforce Stadium; Wilberforce, OH	W 13–7		
October 2	Kentucky State	Wilberforce Stadium; Wilberforce, OH	W 20–7	3,000	
October 8	vs. Tuskegee*	Comiskey Park; Chicago, IL	W 39–8	5,000	
October 16	Grambling*^{†}	Wilberforce Stadium; Wilberforce, OH	W 7–0	3,600	
October 23	vs. Tennessee A&I	Griffith Stadium; Washington, DC (National Classic)	W 26–7	13,007	
October 30	at Lincoln (MO)	Jefferson City, MO	W 13–0		
November 6	at Delaware State*	Dover, DE	W 41–0		
November 13	Philander Smith*	Wilberforce Stadium; Wilberforce, OH	W 41–0		
November 20	at West Virginia State*	Institute, WV	T 12–12	4,000	
December 5	vs. Hampton*	Norfolk, VA (Fish Bowl)	L 19–20	10,000	
January 1, 1949	vs. Prairie View A&M*	Buffalo Stadium; Houston, TX (Prairie View Bowl)	W 6–0	8,358	
*Non-conference game; ^{†}Homecoming
