= 1947 Lincoln Blue Tigers football team =

American college football season

1947 Lincoln Blue Tigers football
- Conference: Midwest Athletic Association
- Record: 3–4–1 (1–3 MWAA)
- Head coach: David D. Rains (3rd season)

1947 Midwest Athletic Association football standings
	Conf.					Overall
Team	W		L		T	W		L		T
No. 1 Tennessee A&I $	3	–	0	–	0	10	–	0	–	0
No. 2 Wilberforce State	3	–	1	–	0	11	–	1	–	0
No. 22 Kentucky State	3	–	2	–	0	4	–	6	–	0
No. 13 Lincoln (MO)	1	–	3	–	0	3	–	4	–	1
Philander Smith	0	–	2	–	0	1	–	9	–	1
Wilberforce	0	–	2	–	0	0	–	6	–	1
No. 12 Louisville Municipal			–			6	–	1	–	1
$ – Conference champion; * – On probation; Rankings from the Pittsburgh Courier using the Dickinson Ratings System.

The 1947 Lincoln Blue Tigers football team was an American football team that represented Lincoln University of Missouri in the Midwest Athletic Association (MWAA) during the 1947 college football season. In its third year under head coach David D. Rains, the team compiled a 5–2–1 record and was ranked No. 13 among the nation's black college football teams according to the Pittsburgh Courier and its Dickinson Rating System. The team played its home games at Lincoln Field in Jefferson City, Missouri.

== Schedule ==
Date	Opponent	Site	Result	Attendance	Source
October 4	at Louisville Municipal*	Louisville, KY	T 0–0		
October 11	Langston*	Lincoln Field; Jefferson City, MO	W 13–6		
October 18	at Kentucky State	Frankfort, KY	L 12–19	5,000	
November 1	at Wilberforce State	Wilberforce Stadium; Xenia, OH	L 6–32		
November 1	at Wilberforce	Wilberforce, OH	W 46–0		
November 8	vs. Lane*	Public School Stadium; St. Louis, MO	W 6–0		
November 15	Tennessee A&I	Lincoln Field; Jefferson City, MO	L 7–26		
November 22	vs. Arkansas AM&N*	Sportsman's Park; St. Louis, MO	L 6–12	7,000	
*Non-conference game
