= 1935 Kentucky State Thorobreds football team =

American college football season

1935 Kentucky State Thorobreds football

Black college national co-champion

Orange Blossom Classic, W 19–9 vs. Florida A&M
- Conference: Midwest Athletic Association
- Record: 9–1 (3–1 MWAA)
- Head coach: Henry Kean (5th season)
- Home stadium: Alumni Field

The 1935 Kentucky State Thorobreds football team was an American football team that represented Kentucky State Industrial College (KISC), now known as Kentucky State University, as a member of the Midwest Athletic Association (MWAA) during the 1935 college football season. In their fifth season under head coach Henry Kean, the Thorobreds compiled a 9–1 record, shut out seven of ten opponents (including five consecutive shutouts in November), outscored all opponents by a total of 192 to 42, and defeated Florida A&M in the Orange Blossom Classic. The team was recognized as a black college national champion for the second consecutive year.

Quarterback Joe "Tarzan" Kendall was known for both his accurate passing and open-field running and was later selected to the all-time black college football team and was inducted into the College Football Hall of Fame. Kendall and end William B. Reed, the latter known for his great blocking, received first-team honors on the All-America college football team selected by The Pittsburgh Courier from the nation's African-American football players. Kendall, Reed, and halfback Big Bertha Edwards received first team All-Southern honors.

Kean's assistant coaches were Stewart and Walker. The team played its home games at Alumni Field in Frankfort, Kentucky.

== Schedule ==
Date	Time	Opponent	Site	Result	Attendance	Source
October 5		West Kentucky Industrial*	Alumni Field; Frankfort, KY	W 21–0		
October 12		at Wilberforce	Wilberforce, OH	L 7–19		
October 19		Lane*	Alumni Field; Frankfort, KY	W 35–0	1,500	
October 26		at Tuskegee*	Alumni Bowl; Tuskegee, AL	W 19–14	4,000	
November 2	1:00 p.m.	at Morris Brown*	Ponce de Leon Park; Atlanta, GA	W 15–0		
November 9		West Virginia State^{†}	Alumni Field; Frankfort, KY	W 13–0	4,000	
November 16		Lincoln (MO)	Frankfort, KY	W 24–0		
November 23		at Louisville Municipal	Central High School stadium; Louisville, KY	W 33–0		
November 28	2:00 p.m.	at Tennessee State*	State College field; Nashville, TN	W 6–0	2,000	
December 7		vs. Florida A&M*	Durkee Field; Jacksonville, FL (Orange Blossom Classic)	W 19–9	5,000	
*Non-conference game; ^{†}Homecoming; All times are in Central time

== Game summaries ==
=== Wilberforce ===
On October 12, Kentucky State lost to Wilberforce, 19–7, in Wilberforce, Ohio. The Thorobreds scored in the second quarter on a 45-yard touchdown pass from Kendall to Reed with Kendall kicking the extra point. The touchdown was not enough, as Wilberforce tallied 19 points on three touchdowns and an extra point. The Thorobreds led, 7–6, at halftime, but Wilberforce added two touchdowns in the second half. Kentucky State was held to only 11 first downs in the game. It was the football program's first loss since December 16, 1933.

=== Lane ===
On October 19, Kentucky State defeated Lane, 35–0, at Alumni Field in Frankfort, Kentucky. The Thorobreds opened the game with a safety after a blocked kick recovered on the goal line. They followed with a 45-yard touchdown pass from Kendall to Woods in the first quarter, a touchdown run by Woods in the second quarter, a touchdown by Hardin in the third quarter, and two touchdown runs by Flash Passmore in the fourth quarter. It was the Thorobreds' highest point total of the season.

=== Tuskegee ===
On October 26, Kentucky State defeated the favored Tuskegee team, 19–14, before a homecoming crowd of 4,000 at Tuskegee, Alabama. Joe "Tarzan" Kendall scored the winning touchdown on a freak touchdown described as follows:

Collier's kick, one of the queerest in Tuskegee's sport history, landed squarely on the 50-yard line, but took a trick backward bounce toward the sidelines, landing on the Tigers' 30-yard stripe. Apparently coming from nowhere, the alert Kendall dashed into the middle of players waiting to down the ball, scooped it up like a hot grounder and shot through an opening into the clear to gallop 30 yards for Kentucky's winning touchdown.

=== Morris Brown ===
On November 2, Kentucky State defeated Morris Brown, 15–0, at Ponce de Leon Park in Atlanta. The Thorobreds scored all of its points in the second half on a 30-yard touchdown run by Atwood, a one-yard touchdown run by Edwards, and a safety when Morris Brown's punter stepped out of his end zone. Kendall converted one of two extra-point kicks.

=== West Virginia State ===
On November 9, Kentucky State defeated West Virginia State, 13–0, before a homecoming crowd of 4,000 at Alumni Field in Frankfort, Kentucky. The Thorobreds scored two touchdowns on passes by Joe Kendall to Woods and Harding.

=== Tennessee State ===
On November 28 (Thanksgiving Day), Kentucky State concluded its regular season schedule with a 6–0 victory over Tennessee State before a homecoming crowd of 2,500 on Tennessee State's home field in Nashville, Tennessee. The only points of the game were scored in the first quarter when Tennessee punted from its own two-yard line; the punt was blocked, and a Thorobred player scooped the ball and ran for a touchdown. It was the fifth consecutive game in which Kentucky State held opponents scoreless.

=== Florida A&M (Orange Blossom Classic) ===
On December 7, the Thorobreds defeated Florida A&M, 19–9, in the third annual Orange Blossom Classic before a crowd of 5,000 at Durkee Field in Jacksonville, Florida. Kentucky State scored all of its points (three touchdowns and one extra point) in the second quarter, including a 65-yard touchdown reception by Woods. Joe Kendall's passing was a feature of the game with Hardin, Woods, and Stevens as his principal targets.

== Roster ==
- William "Bill" Atwood, halfback
- Beck, tackle
- Elmer Collins, guard
- Big Bertha Edwards, fullback
- Robert Hardin, end
- Jones, guard
- Joe "Tarzan" Kendall, quarterback
- Norman "Flash" Passmore, back
- William B. Reed (sometimes referred as Reid), end
- Timothy Robinson, tackle
- Grover Stevens (sometimes spelled "Stephens"), fullback
- White, center
- Wood (sometimes referred to as Woods), halfback
