= John A. Bell =

American football coach and civil rights official (born 1929)

Biographical details
- Born: 1929

Coaching career (HC unless noted)
- 1959–1960: Mississippi Vocational

Administrative career (AD unless noted)
- 1959–1961: Mississippi Vocational

Head coaching record
- Overall: 5–9–2

Accomplishments and honors

Championships
- 1 SCAC (1959)

John Anthony Bell (born 1929) was an American football coach and college athletics administrator, and later a civil rights officer in the United States Department of Health, Education, and Welfare, with broad authority over several states.

== Early life, education, and coaching career ==
A native of Little Rock, Arkansas, Bell earned a bachelor's degree from Philander Smith College in 1951, where he was a member of Kappa Alpha Psi fraternity. He earned a master's degree from the University of Arkansas, receiving additional graduate education at Indiana University. He was an assistant football coach at Lincoln High School in Fort Smith, Arkansas and then line and backfield coach at Texas College in Tyler, Texas.

He served as the head football coach at Mississippi Vocational College (MVC)—now known as Mississippi Valley State University—in Itta Bena, Mississippi for two seasons. In his first season as head football coach at Mississippi Vocational, Bell led the team to the South Central Athletic Conference championship. In his two years as head coach at MVC, he compiled a 5–9–2 record.

Following his time at MVC, Bell was announced as the new Dean of Men at the historically black Knoxville College on July 7, 1961. In that capacity, Bell denied a police claim that Knoxville College students had made up a significant proportion of participants in an anti-segregation rally in April 1963. In September 1963, it was reported that Bell was one of two Knoxville College faculty members for whom the United Negro College Fund Faculty Fellowship Program had granted funds to pursue doctoral degrees, with the report stating that "Mr. Bell will study for a doctorate in physical education at the University of Georgia". Bell thereafter received a Ph.D. from Indiana University, receiving approval for his dissertation on the effects of certain recreational and academic factors on "Negro students enrolled in the secondary public schools of Eastern Tennessee".

== Educational civil rights career ==
By December 1968, Bell had received his doctorate and was a program officer in the Texas Education Agency, and participated in a review of Lubbock County, Texas schools overseen by the United States Office of Education. The following year, Bell testified about Lubbock's plans in a hearing on the matter in Dallas, questioning whether they would ever lead to integration of the district, and proposing two alternative plans to achieve this goal. By October 1970, Bell was chief of the Civil Rights Division of the U.S. Office of Education in Dallas, and by 1971, his title was reported as chief of the education branch of the Office of Civil Rights, Department of Health, Education, and Welfare, from which position he continued to review Texas school district desegregation plans throughout the 1970s.

In one incident in 1975, Bell learned that the East Baton Rouge Parish School Board was allowing the Ku Klux Klan to hold meetings in one of the schools during nonschool hours, and sent a telegram to the Board deeming this a violation of various federal regulations, threatening to cut off federal funding to the district; the Klan sued, and in 1978 the United States Court of Appeals for the Fifth Circuit ruled in favor of the Klan. By June 1980, Bell was Director of the Education and Secondary Education Division of the Office of Civil Rights, Department of Health, Education, and Welfare, a position from which he was responsible for the office examining complaints of discrimination in education in an area including New Mexico, Texas, Louisiana, and Oklahoma.

By June 1989, Bell had left the government and established a private firm, Bell and Associates, School Desegregation and Educational Civil Rights Consultants. In 1992, Bell was the commencement speaker at his first alma mater, Philander Smith College. In 1996, the Galveston Independent School District invited Bell, as "a desegregation expert", to review its desegregation plans, and in 1999 and 2000, Bell was a consultant for the United States Department of Justice in an investigation of desegregation progress in Lafayette Parish, Louisiana, with Bell producing a report criticizing the school system for allowing "racially identifiable" schools to persist.

== Head coaching record ==
| Year | Team | Overall | Conference | Standing | Bowl/playoffs |
|---|---|---|---|---|---|
Mississippi Vocational Delta Devils (South Central Athletic Conference) (1959–1960)
| 1959 | Mississippi Vocational | 3–4–1 | 3–1 | 1st | |
| 1960 | Mississippi Vocational | 2–5–1 | | | |
| Mississippi Vocational: | | 5–9–2 | | | |
| Total: | | 5–9–2 | | | |
National championship Conference title Conference division title or championship game berth
