= 1947 Tennessee A&I Tigers football team =

American college football season

1947 Tennessee A&I Tigers football

Black college national champion MWAA champion
- Conference: Midwest Athletic Association
- Record: 10–0 (3–0 MWAA)
- Head coach: Henry Kean (4th season)
- Home stadium: Sulphur Dell

1947 Midwest Athletic Association football standings
	Conf.					Overall
Team	W		L		T	W		L		T
No. 1 Tennessee A&I $	3	–	0	–	0	10	–	0	–	0
No. 2 Wilberforce State	3	–	1	–	0	11	–	1	–	0
No. 22 Kentucky State	3	–	2	–	0	4	–	6	–	0
No. 13 Lincoln (MO)	1	–	3	–	0	3	–	4	–	1
Philander Smith	0	–	2	–	0	1	–	9	–	1
Wilberforce	0	–	2	–	0	0	–	6	–	1
No. 12 Louisville Municipal *			–			6	–	1	–	1
$ – Conference champion; * – On probation; Rankings from the Pittsburgh Courier using the Dickinson Ratings System.

The 1947 Tennessee A&I Tigers football team represented Tennessee Agricultural & Industrial State College as a member of the Midwest Athletic Association (MWAA) during the 1947 college football season. In their fourth season under head coach Henry Kean, the Tigers compiled a perfect 10–0 record, won the MWAA championship, and outscored opponents by a total of 293 to 58. The team was also recognized as black college national champion for the second consecutive season.

Tennessee A&I had an enrollment of 2,204 students in the fall of 1947.

== Schedule ==
Date	Opponent	Site	Result	Attendance	Source
September 19	vs. Arkansas AM&N*	Memphis, TN	W 28–0	8,000	
September 27	at Texas College*	Steer Stadium; Tyler, TX	W 34–0		
October 4	at Langston*	Page Stadium; Oklahoma City, OK	W 33–0		
October 10	Allen*	Sulphur Dell; Nashville, TN	W 26–0		
October 18	at West Virginia State*	Institute, WV	W 27–12		
October 25	Wilberforce State	Sulphur Dell; Nashville, TN	W 14–7		
November 1	at North Carolina College*	Durham, NC	W 21–6	4,500	
November 7	Alcorn A&M*	Sulphur Dell; Nashville, TN	W 66–7		
November 15	at Lincoln (MO)	Jefferson City, MO	W 26–7		
November 27	Kentucky State	Nashville, TN	W 20–13		
*Non-conference game
