= Conroe Normal and Industrial College =

Location
- 10th Street, Conroe, Montgomery County, Texas, U.S.
- Coordinates: 30.318311°N 95.445788°W

Information
- Other name: Conroe College, Conroe Baptist Theological Institute
- School type: Private vocational
- Religious affiliation(s): Baptist
- Established: April 1903
- Founder: Jimmie Johnson
- Closed: 1981

Conroe Normal and Industrial College (1903–1981) was a private co-educational vocational school and normal school for African American students, founded in 1903 in Conroe, Texas, United States. The school also went by the names Conroe Baptist Theological Institute, and Conroe College.

== History ==
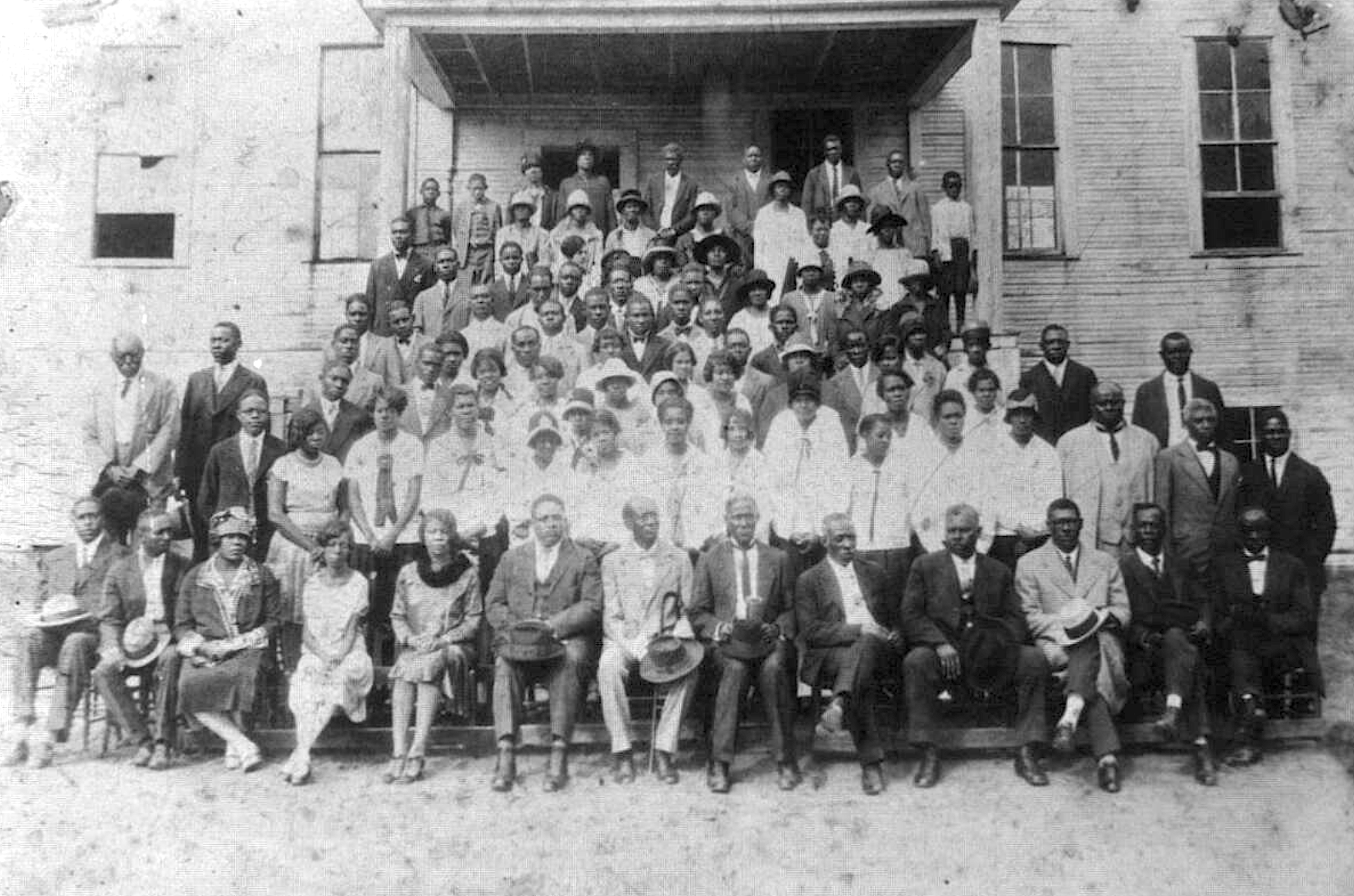
Conroe Normal and Industrial College faculty (c. 1903)

Conroe Normal and Industrial College was established in April 1903, by founding president Jimmie Johnson. Johnson fundraised for the formation of the school through extensive travel within Texas and lecturing; he solicited for funds from black churches, black associations, and black conventions.

Johnson and his wife were among the small number of early teachers at the school in the early years. David Abner Jr. took over as the second president. William A. Johnson served as the third president.

It was on 10th Street. Its five-story main building burned in 1915 and a new two-story building constructed for it.

The school had a lot of land, approximately 105 acres which was an active farm that students worked on tending livestock, growing crops, and indoor domestic work. Boys and girls were taught at the school separately, and were required to wear uniforms.

In the 1980s, the school was one of the organizational locations for the "Free Clarence Brandley" movement.

In October 2014, the Conroe Baptist Theological Institute deeded the remaining 20-plus acre campus to a private investor.

== Presidents ==
- Jimmie Johnson (1903–1906)
- David Abner Jr. (1906–1919)
- William A. Johnson (1919–?)
- Warren S. Brent
- C. H. Durden
- A. L. Bradley
- J. S. Curry
- I. S. Spencer
- P. J. Walker (1971–?)

== Archives and legacy ==
UTSA Libraries has a 1947 photograph of Baptist ministers in front of the school. TCU Libraries have a collection of photographs, interviews, and documents about the school.

In 2017, Robin Navarro Montgomery and the Montgomery County Historical Commission were working on adding a state historical marker to the 10th Street location. In 2021, plans were announced to restore the one remaining college building into a youth community center.

== See also ==
- Guadalupe College
