= 1932 Kentucky State Thorobreds football team =

American college football season

1932 Kentucky State Thorobreds football

MWAA champion
- Conference: Midwest Athletic Association
- Record: 5–0–2 (2–0–1 MWAA)
- Head coach: Henry Kean (2nd season)
- Home stadium: Alumni Field

The 1932 Kentucky State Thorobreds football team represented Kentucky State Industrial College (KISC)—now known as Kentucky State University—as a member of the Midwest Athletic Association (MWAA) during the 1932 college football season. Led by second-year head coach Henry Kean, the Thorobreds compiled an overall record of 5–0–2 with a mark of 2–0–1 in conference play, winning the MWAA title.

== Schedule ==
Date	Time	Opponent	Site	Result	Source
October 1		at Lincoln (MO)*	Jefferson City, MO	W 20–8	
October 8		at West Virginia State	Institute, WV	W 19–7	
October 15		Wilberforce	Alumni Field; Frankfort, KY	T 0–0	
October 29	2:30 p.m.	at Knoxville*	Knoxville College field; Knoxville, TN	W 14–0	
November 5	2:30 p.m.	Louisville Municipal	Alumni Field; Frankfort, KY	W 46–0	
November 11		at Morristown*	Morristown, TN	T 6–6	
November 19		Bluefield State*^{†}	Alumni Field; Frankfort, KY	W 25–8	
*Non-conference game; ^{†}Homecoming; All times are in Central time
