= 1949 Tennessee A&I Tigers football team =

American college football season

1949 Tennessee A&I Tigers football

MWAA champion
- Conference: Midwest Athletic Association
- Record: 9–1 (4–0 MWAA)
- Head coach: Henry Kean (6th season)

1949 Midwest Athletic Association football standings
	Conf.					Overall
Team	W		L		T	W		L		T
No. 4 Tennessee A&I $	4	–	0	–	0	9	–	1	–	0
No. 16 Wilberforce State	2	–	1	–	0	5	–	4	–	0
No. 16 Kentucky State	2	–	2	–	0	6	–	4	–	0
Louisville Municipal	0	–	2	–	0	3	–	5	–	0
Lincoln (MO)	0	–	3	–	0	3	–	6	–	0
$ – Conference champion; Rankings from the Pittsburgh Courier

The 1949 Tennessee A&I Tigers football team was an American football team that represented Tennessee Agricultural & Industrial State College as a member of the Midwest Athletic Association (MWAA) during the 1949 college football season. In their sixth season under head coach Henry Kean, the Tigers compiled a 9–1 record, won the MWAA championship, and outscored opponents by a total of 299 to 87. The team was ranked fourth among the nation's black college football teams according to the Pittsburgh Courier and its Dickinson Rating System.

== Schedule ==
Date	Opponent	Site	Result	Attendance	Source
September 24	at Lincoln (MO)	Jefferson City, MO	W 19–6		
October 1	at Langston*	Langston, OK	W 10–0	3,500	
October 8	Allen*	Nashville, TN	W 56–0		
October 15	at West Virginia State*	Lakin Field; Institute, WV	L 21–25	> 3,000	
October 22	Wilberforce State	Nashville, TN	W 28–7		
October 29	at North Carolina College*	Durham, NC	W 19–18		
November 5	at North Carolina A&T*	Greensboro, NC	W 19–18		
November 19	at Louisville Municipal	Louisville, KY	W 52–0		
November 24	Kentucky State	Nashville, TN	W 27–0		
December 3	at Jackson*	Alumni Field; Jackson, MS (Magnolia Classic)	W 48–13		
*Non-conference game
