= Big Bertha Edwards =

American football coach

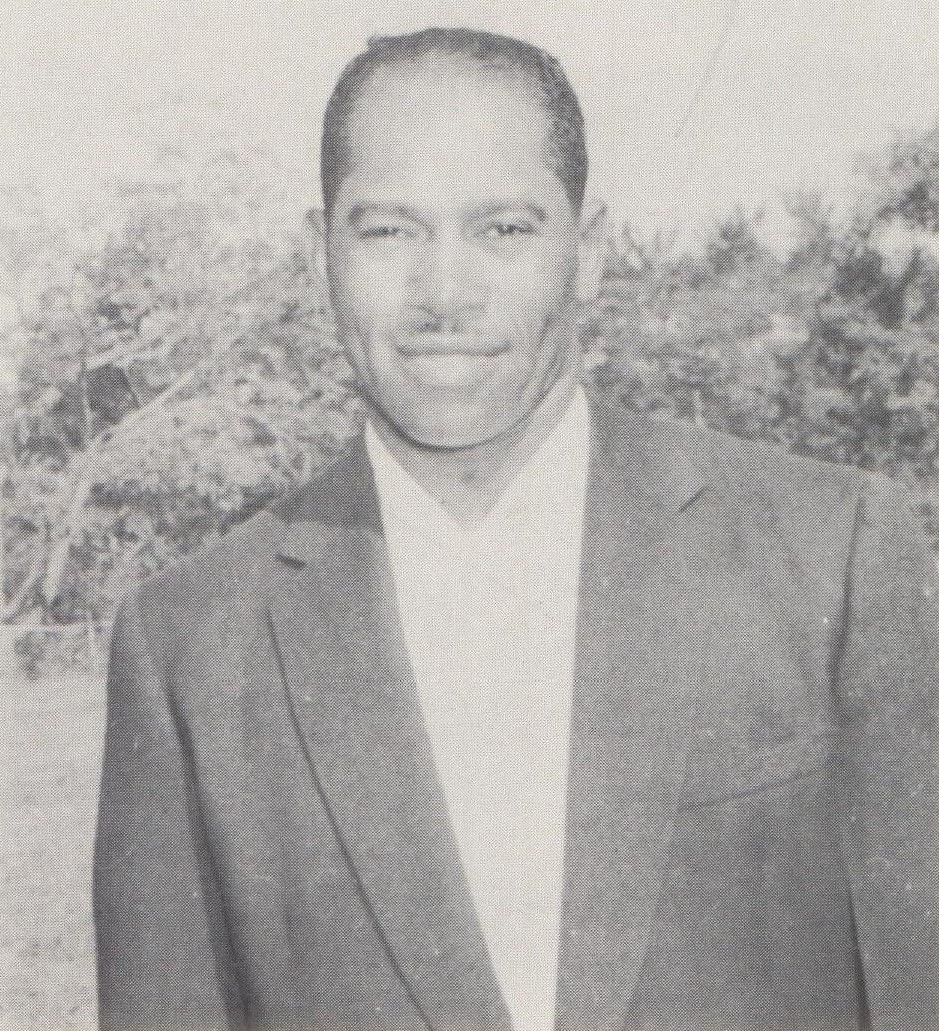

Biographical details
- Education: Kentucky State College (bachelor's 1939, master's 1951)

Playing career

Football
- 1934–1937: Kentucky State
- 194?: Harlem Brown Bombers
- 194?: Patterson Panthers
- Position: Quarterback

Coaching career (HC unless noted)

Football
- 1944: DuSable HS (IL)
- 1947–1950: Kentucky State (backfield)
- 1951–1956: Kentucky State

Baseball
- 1950: Kentucky State

Head coaching record
- Overall: 27–27–2 (college football)

George "Big Bertha" Edwards was an American football player and coach. He served as the head football coach at Kentucky State College—now known as Kentucky State University from 1951 to 1956, compiling a record of 27–27–2.

== Football career ==
Edwards played football at Englewood High School in Chicago, where he earned All-City, All-Chicagoland, and All-State honors. He played college football at Kentucky State College from 1934 to 1937, and the team won national championships in 1934 and 1935. He was selected for the 1938 All-Star team that lost to the professional Chicago Bears by a score of 51–0. He was selected for All-American honors in 1934 and 1937. He was captain of the 1937 Kentucky State and All-American teams. He also played on the school's basketball team from 1934 to 1937, and in 1999, he was selected as a member of that team's all-time second team.

He went on the play two years of semi-professional football, one with the Harlem Brown Bombers, and one with the Patterson Panthers. Edwards coached the DuSable High School football team for two seasons, including 1944. He coached basketball at Russellville High School in Kentucky, compiling a 64–11 record and winning a tri-state championship.

Edwards returned to Kentucky State in 1947 to be the school's boxing coach and the football backfield coach. He was also head baseball coach in 1950. He was named head football coach on December 1, 1950. Edwards was the 11th head football coach at Kentucky State, and he held that position for six seasons, from 1951 until 1956. His career coaching record at Kentucky State was 27–27–2. He resigned his coaching position effective June 30, 1957.

He was an inaugural inductee to the Kentucky State Athletic Hall of Fame in 1975.

He was married and had three sons as of 1950.

== Head coaching record ==
=== College football ===
Year	Team	Overall	Conference	Standing	Bowl/playoffs
Kentucky State Thorobreds (Midwest Athletic Association) (1951–1956)
1951	Kentucky State	2–7	0–4	6th	
1951	Kentucky State	4–6–1	0–4	7th	
1953	Kentucky State	6–4	1–3	5th	
1954	Kentucky State	5–3	1–3	6th	
1955	Kentucky State	7–2	2–2	4th	
1956	Kentucky State	3–5–1	0–3–1	6th	
Kentucky State:		27–27–2	4–19–1		
Total:		27–27–2			
