= 1944 Tennessee A&I Tigers football team =

American college football season

1944 Tennessee A&I Tigers football

Vulcan Bowl, W 13–0 vs. Tuskegee
- Conference: Midwest Athletic Association
- Record: 8–2–1 (3–0 MWAA)
- Head coach: Henry Kean (1st season)
- Home stadium: A&I Gridiron

The 1944 Tennessee A&I Tigers football team represented Tennessee Agricultural & Industrial State College (now known as Tennessee State University) as a member of the Midwest Athletic Association (MWAA) during the 1944 college football season. Led by first-year head coach Henry Kean, the Tigers compiled an overall record of 8–2–1.

== Schedule ==
Date	Opponent	Site	Result	Attendance	Source
October 7	at Langston*	Page Stadium; Oklahoma City, OK	T 6–6		
October 14	Langston*	A&I Gridiron; Nashville, TN	W 33–7		
October 19	at Clark (GA)*	Ponce de Leon Park; Atlanta, GA	W 14–6	4,000	
October 28	at Wilberforce	Wilberforce Stadium; Xenia, OH	W 13–0		
November 4	at Florida A&M*	Sampson-Bragg Field; Tallahassee, FL	L 19–7		
November 11	Clark (GA)*	A&I Gridiron; Nashville, TN	L 6–7		
November 18	Lincoln (MO)	A&I Gridiron; Nashville, TN	W 31–13		
November 25	Florida A&M*	A&I Gridiron; Nashville, TN	W 12–0		
November 30	Wilberforce	A&I Gridiron; Nashville, TN	W 19–18		
December 9	vs. Arkansas AM&N*	Booker T. Washington Stadium; Memphis, TN	W 50–19	2,500	
January 1, 1945	vs. Tuskegee*	Rickwood Field; Birmingham, AL (Vulcan Bowl)	W 13–0	6,000	
*Non-conference game
