= James McCrary =

American football coach, educator (c. 1911 – 1975)

Biographical details
- Born: c. 1911
- Died: October 29, 1975 (aged 64); Howell, Michigan, U.S.

Playing career
- 1933–1934: Michigan State
- Position: Fullback

Coaching career (HC unless noted)
- 1935: Arkansas AM&N
- 1936: Wilberforce (assistant)
- 1937: Wilberforce
- 1941: Wilberforce (backfield)
- c. 1945: Miller HS (MI) (assistant)

Head coaching record
- Overall: 8–8–1

James L. McCrary (c. 1911 – October 29, 1975) was an American educator and college football player and coach. He served as the head football coach at Arkansas Agricultural, Mechanical & Normal College (Arkansas AM&N)—now known as University of Arkansas at Pine Bluff—in 1935 and at Wilberforce University—in 1937.

A native of Flint, Michigan, McCrary played football at Michigan State College—now known as Michigan State University—as a fullback in 1933 and 1934. He was hired as an assistant football coach at Wilberforce in 1935 and promoted to head coach the following year. McCrary resigned from his post at Wilberforce in 1938, and was succeeding by Gaston F. Lewis.

McCrary later coached football at Miller High School in Detroit, and taught at the Moore School for Boys in Detroit for 29 years, until his retirement in 1973. He died on October 29, 1975, at McPherson Community Health Center in Howell, Michigan. He was inducted into the Greater Flint Afro-American Hall of Fame in 1985.

== Head coaching record ==
Year	Team	Overall	Conference	Standing	Bowl/playoffs
Arkansas AM&N Lions (Independent) (1935)
1935	Arkansas AM&N	4–6			
Arkansas AM&N:		4–6			
Wilberforce Green Wave (Midwest Athletic Association) (1937)
1937	Wilberforce	4–2–1	2–2–1	4th	
Wilberforce:		4–2–1	2–2–1		
Total:		8–8–1			
