= 1948 North Carolina A&T Aggies football team =

American college football season

1948 North Carolina A&T Aggies football

Vulcan Bowl, L 13–23 vs. Kentucky State
- Conference: Colored Intercollegiate Athletic Association
- Record: 4–4–1 (4–2–1 CIAA)
- Head coach: William M. Bell (3rd season)
- Home stadium: World War Memorial Stadium

1948 Colored Intercollegiate Athletic Association football standings
	Conf.					Overall
Team	W		L		T	W		L		T
No. 4 West Virginia State $	5	–	1	–	0	5	–	2	–	2
Winston-Salem State	5	–	1	–	0	8	–	1	–	0
Howard	7	–	2	–	0	7	–	4	–	0
No. 8 Lincoln (PA)	4	–	2	–	0	5	–	2	–	0
North Carolina A&T	4	–	2	–	1	4	–	4	–	1
No. 9 Morgan State	5	–	3	–	0	5	–	3	–	0
Virginia State	5	–	3	–	0	5	–	3	–	0
North Carolina College	4	–	3	–	1	6	–	3	–	1
Shaw	4	–	3	–	0	4	–	3	–	0
Delaware State	4	–	4	–	0	4	–	5	–	0
No. 10 Virginia Union	3	–	5	–	0	6	–	5	–	0
Hampton	2	–	5	–	1	4	–	5	–	1
Bluefield State	1	–	5	–	0	2	–	7	–	0
Johnson C. Smith	0	–	7	–	1	0	–	7	–	1
St. Augustine's	1	–	4	–	0	4	–	4	–	0
Saint Paul's (VA)	0	–	4	–	0	0	–	4	–	0
$ – Conference champion; Rankings from the Pittsburgh Courier

The 1948 North Carolina A&T Aggies football team was an American football team that represented the North Carolina A&T State University as a member of the Colored Intercollegiate Athletic Association (CIAA) during the 1948 college football season. In their third season under head coach William M. Bell, the Aggies finished the season with an overall record of 4–4–1 and 4–2–1 in conference playing, placing fourth in the CIAA. They were invited to the Vulcan Bowl, where they lost to Kentucky State.

== Schedule ==
Date	Opponent	Site	Result	Attendance	Source
September 25	at Wilberforce State*	Wilberforce Stadium; Wilberforce, OH	L 7–13		
October 2	Virginia Union	World War Memorial Stadium; Greensboro, NC	W 14–7		
October 9	at Hampton	Armstrong Field; Hampton, VA	L 0–21		
October 16	at Shaw	Chavis Park; Raleigh, NC	L 6–12	5,000	
October 30	Morgan State^{†}	World War Memorial Stadium; Greensboro, NC	W 6–0		
November 13	Virginia State	World War Memorial Stadium; Greensboro, NC	W 14–0		
November 25	Johnson C. Smith	World War Memorial Stadium; Greensboro, NC	W 32–7		
December 4	North Carolina College	World War Memorial Stadium; Greensboro, NC (rivalry)	T 6–6		
January 1	vs. Kentucky State*	Rickwood Field; Birmingham, AL (Vulcan Bowl)	L 13–23	6,000	
*Non-conference game; ^{†}Homecoming
