= 1947 Alcorn A&M Braves football team =

American college football season

1967 Alcorn A&M Braves football

Black smaller college national champion SCAC champion
- Conference: South Central Athletic Conference
- Record: 10–1 (7–0 SCAC)
- Head coach: W. Felix Harris (1st season)

The 1947 Alcorn A&M Braves football team was an American football team that represented Alcorn A&M College as a member of the South Central Athletic Conference (SCAC) during the 1947 college football season. In their first season under head coach W. Felix Harris, Alcorn compiled a 10–1 record (7–0 against conference opponents), shut out eight of eleven opponents, and outscored all opponents by a total of 327 to 79. The team won the SCAC championship, and was also ranked No. 1 among the nation's smaller black college football teams by the Pittsburgh Courier using the Dickinson Rating System. The team played its home games in Alcorn, Mississippi.

== Schedule ==
| Date | Opponent | Site | Result | Attendance | Source |
|---|---|---|---|---|---|
| September 20 | Central Louisiana Trade School* | Bolton High School Stadium; Alexandria, LA | W 66–0 | | |
| September 26 | Rust | Murphy Stadium; Greenville, MS | W 24–0 | | |
| October 4 | Philander Smith* | Alcorn, MS | W 20–0 | | |
| October 11 | at Southern Christian Institute | Vicksburg, MS | W 75–0 | | |
| October 18 | Mississippi Industrial | Alcorn, MS | W 19–0 | | |
| October 25 | at Jackson State | King's Field; Vicksburg, MS | W 13–0 | 5,000 | |
| November 1 | Tougaloo | Alcorn, MS | W 7–0 | | |
| November 8 | at Tennessee A&I* | Sulphur Dell; Nashville, TN | L 7–66 | | |
| November 15 | Tillotson* | Fort Gibbons, MS | W 14–6 | | |
| November 25 | at Leland | Baton Rouge, LA | W 26–7 | | |
| | Okolona Industrial School | | W 56–0 | | |
*Non-conference game
