= Gulf Coast Athletic Conference (1958–1965) =

College sports conference of historically Black colleges and universities

The Gulf Coast Athletic Conference was a short-lived NCAA conference of HBCUs. Five of the schools broke away from the South Central Athletic Conference, while Huston–Tillotson College had previously been a member of the Midwest Athletic Association. The schools split up by 1965.

== Member schools ==
Institution	Location	Founded	Nickname	Joined	Previous conference	Left	Subsequent conference joined	Current conference
Bishop College	Marshall, Texas	1881	Tigers	1957	SCAC	1965	Independents	closed 1988
Dillard University	New Orleans, Louisiana	1930	Bleu Devils	1957	SCAC	1965	Independents	Gulf Coast Athletic
Huston–Tillotson College	Austin, Texas	1875	Rams	1957	Midwest Athletic Association			Red River Athletic Conference
Philander Smith College	Little Rock, Arkansas	1877	Panthers	1957	SCAC	1965	Independents	Gulf Coast Athletic
Rust College	Holly Springs, Mississippi	1866	Bearcats	1957	SCAC	1965	Independents	Gulf Coast Athletic
Tougaloo College	Tougaloo, Mississippi	1869	Bulldogs	1957	SCAC	1965	Independents	Gulf Coast Athletic
