= Bishop College =

Historically black college in Marshall, Texas (1881–1988)

- Type: HBCU
- Active: 1881–1988
- Location: Marshall and Dallas, Texas, United States; 32°40′41″N 96°45′19″W
- Mascot: Tiger

Bishop College was a historically black college, founded in Marshall, Texas, United States, in 1881 by the Baptist Home Mission Society. It was intended to serve students in east Texas, where the majority of the black population lived at the time. In 1961 the administration moved the college into Dallas, Texas. It closed in 1988.

In 2006 the president of Georgetown College, reached out to Bishop College alumni, proposing to have them "adopt" his college as an alma mater. He offered scholarships to their descendants, with a chance to have their diploma read "Bishop College". This was part of an effort to increase minority enrollment at Georgetown.

== History ==
1850 plot plan of Bishop College (Wyalucing)

The college was founded by the Baptist Home Mission Society in 1881 as the result of a movement to build a college for African-American Baptists. Nathan Bishop, who had been the superintendent of several major school systems in New England, started this effort. Baylor University President Rufus C. Burleson secured a pledge of $25,000 from Judge Bishop to start the college during a meeting of the National Baptist Education Society meeting in Philadelphia.

A committee of Baptist ministers from East Texas, where most African Americans then lived, selected a location in Marshall, on land belonging to the Holcomb Plantation, Wyalucing.

For the college's first several decades, Bishop's faculty and administration were staffed largely by European Americans. The first African American appointed as president was Joseph J. Rhoads, who started in 1929 and served through the Great Depression and World War II. During his presidency, Bishop phased out the high school preparatory programs associated with the college, which had operated to help students compensate for failures in public education. He emphasized the college's new two-year ministerial program.

During the 1930s and 1940s, the ministerial program was developed as the Lacey Kirk Williams Institute. It moved to Dallas when the college moved in 1961. The Lacey Kirk Williams Institute evolved into a week-long seminar which attracted well-known preachers including Jesse Jackson and Martin Luther King Sr. in 1975. (source, Lloyd Thompson's dissertation for North Texas University, p 34–35)

In 1961, after receiving a grant from the Hoblitzelle Foundation, Bishop moved to a 360-acre (1.5 km^{2}) campus in Dallas. It was able to attract more students there. In Dallas, enrollments increased, peaking at almost 2,000 students around 1970.

The college closed in 1988 after a financial scandal led to the revocation of its accreditation, and its eligibility to receive funds from charities such as the UNCF. Purchased in 1990 by Comer S. Cottrell, the campus is now used by Paul Quinn College.

In 2006, the president of Georgetown College proposed a plan to Bishop College alumni to make Georgetown their adopted alma mater. Georgetown offers scholarships to children or grandchildren of Bishop alumni or students nominated by Bishop alumni. Upon graduation, these students receive diplomas with the name and insignia of Bishop College. Georgetown president William H. Crouch Jr. hopes the program will help the college reach its goal of increasing minority enrollment to 25% by 2012.

== Athletics ==
The Bishop athletic teams were called the Tigers. The college was a member of the National Association of Intercollegiate Athletics (NAIA), primarily competing as an NAIA Independent from 1965–66 to the school's closure in 1987–88. The Tigers previously competed in the Gulf Coast Athletic Conference (GCAC) from 1958–59 to 1964–65, and the South Central Athletic Conference from 1956–57 to 1957–58. They were also a founding member of the Southwestern Athletic Conference (SWAC) from 1920–21 to 1955–56, which is currently an NCAA Division I FCS athletic conference.

== Notable alumni ==
Listed below is a list of select notable alumni, listed in alphabetical order by last name.

Name	Class year	Notability	Reference(s)
David Abner Jr.		First African American to graduate from a college in Texas, president of Guadalupe College and Conroe College	
TeCora Ballom	1978	United States Assistant Surgeon General, U.S. Public Health Service, Rear Admiral US Public Health Service	
Harry Blake		pastor and civil rights leader in Shreveport, Louisiana	
R. H. Boyd		Founder and head of the National Baptist Publishing Board	
Ella J. Bradley-Hughley	1907	choir director, and a soprano soloist, popular from 1911 until 1918 in Los Angeles, California	
Bobby Brooks		NFL Player, New York Giants	
William Harris	1987	NFL player, St. Louis Cardinals, Tampa Bay Buccaneers, Green Bay Packers	
Frederick D. Haynes III	1982	Senior pastor of Friendship-West Baptist Church, former Rainbow/PUSH CEO, and United States House of Representatives member-elect	
Mae C. King	1960	Notable political scientist, founder of several professional organizations, and first African American and first woman on the staff of the American Political Science Association	
Tony Martin		Dropped out after his freshman year in 1983 and eventually transferred to Mesa State College in 1987. NFL Player, Miami Dolphins and San Diego Chargers	
Tony McGee	1971	NFL defensive end (Chicago, New England, Washington); transfer from Wyoming	
Sybil Collins Mobley		Educator, founder of the Florida A&M University business school	
William Nickerson, Jr.		Founder of Golden State Mutual Life Insurance Company, at one time largest black-owned business in the West	
Ike Thomas	1970	NFL Player, Dallas Cowboys, Green Bay Packers and Buffalo Bills	
Emmitt Thomas	1966	Member of the NFL Pro Football Hall of Fame	
Michael S. Williams	1976	Pastor, St. James Missionary Baptist Church, San Francisco, CA. Former board member (1996-1999), National Baptist Convention U.S.A., Inc.	
