= Maud A. B. Fuller =

American educator (1868–1972)

- Born: Maud Anna Berry; October 7, 1868; Lockhart, Texas, United States
- Died: January 26, 1972 (aged 103); Lockhart, Texas, United States
- Other names: M. A. B. Smith; M. A. B. Fuller
- Education: Tillotson College, Guadalupe College
- Occupations: Educator, editor, missionary
- Spouse: William Handy Fuller (m. 1914–1941)

Maud Anna Berry Fuller (October 7, 1868 – January 26, 1972), also known as M. A. B. Smith and M. A. B. Fuller, was an American educator and a leader in the Baptist church. She was the founder and the editor of the Woman's Helper, a national newspaper. Fuller served for 41 years as the president of the National Baptist Convention's Women's Auxiliary.

== Biography ==
Maud Anna Berry was born in Lockhart, Texas, United States, on October 7, 1868. She was the daughter of Hugh and Anna Berry. She attended Tillotson College and then went on to Guadalupe College. Berry went on to teach for some time in Seguin, Texas. She later taught in Austin, Texas, and in other Texas cities.

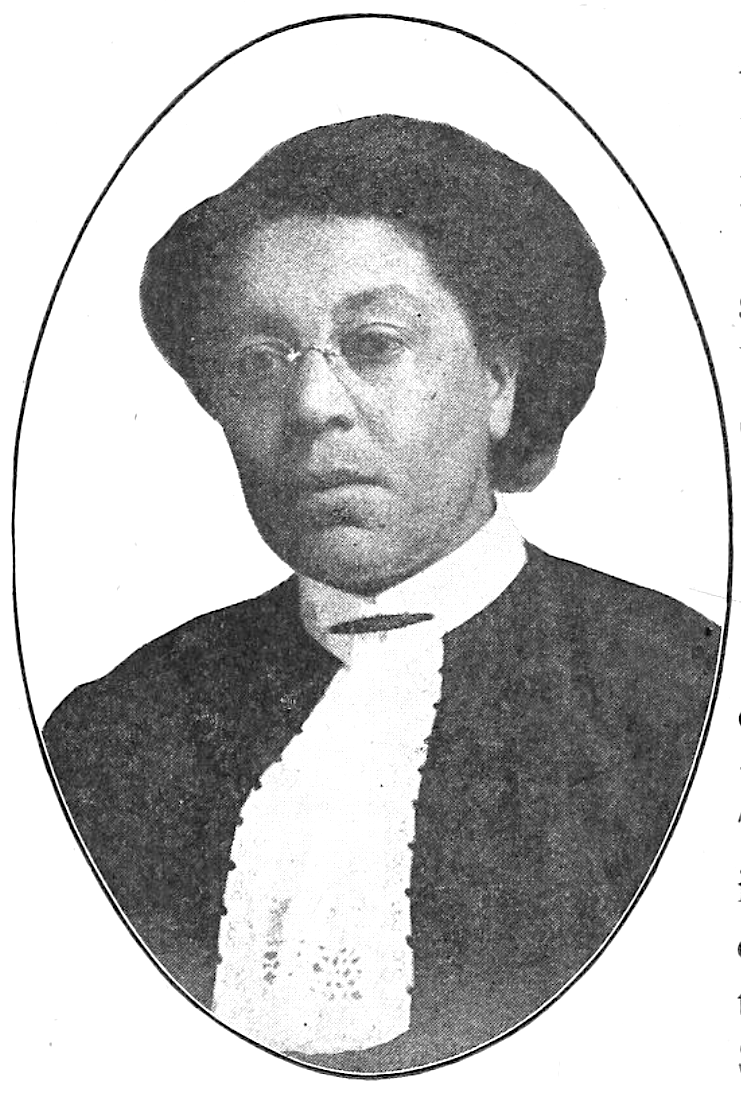
Fuller, circa 1913

Before 1913, Berry used the married name Mrs. M. A. B. Smith. At this time, she was the corresponding secretary of the Women's Auxiliary, General Baptist State Convention of Texas, and ran the Missionary Training School of Guadalupe.

Smith married William Handy Fuller in 1914, taking his last name. They were together until his death in 1941. Later, in 1932, they would purchase and run the N.W. Rhambo Funeral Parlor and a funeral home. The Fullers were known for taking in orphans and providing education for young people and educated them both at her home and abroad. Margaret Taylor Simms was orphaned at the age of 13 and came to live with Fuller. Simms would go on to work at Fisk as a dean. Maude Fuller George of Liberia graduated from the Florida Normal and Industrial Institute in 1943.

She became the secretary to the Woman's Auxiliary of the National Baptist Convention in 1916 and then became president in 1928. She wrote literature for missionaries, including Guides for Home and Foreign Missionary Societies. She also founded and edited the national newspaper, the Woman's Helper.

Fuller raised the money to build a mission in Liberia in 1944. She went on several missions to Africa, including the one that secured the land for the permanent mission in Liberia. She also gave speeches and spoke about her missionary work around the country.

In 1954, she was given an honorary humanities degree and a doctorate from the Union Baptist Theological Seminary. Fuller retired as the president of the Woman's Auxiliary of the National Baptist Convention in 1968 and became the president emeritus.

Fuller died at the age of 103 on January 26, 1972, in her home in Lockhart. She is buried in Austin in the Evergreen Cemetery. She was fondly called "Mother Fuller" or "Aunt Maude" by people who knew her. The prayer room of the Ebenezer Baptist Church in Austin is named after Fuller.
