= Joe Kendall (American football) =

American football player (1909–1965)

Profile
- Position: Halfback

Personal information
- Born: October 2, 1909; Owensboro, Kentucky, U.S.
- Died: November 25, 1965 (aged 56); Owensboro, Kentucky, U.S.
- Listed height: 6 ft 2 in (1.88 m)
- Listed weight: 171 lb (78 kg)

Career information
- High school: Western Colored (Owensboro, KY)
- College: West Kentucky Industrial College (1932); Kentucky State (1933–1936)

Awards and highlights
- Consensus Black college football national champion (1934); 3× TPC First-team All-American (1934–1936); Black College Football Hall of Fame (2011)
- College Football Hall of Fame (Class of 2007)

Joseph Nathaniel Kendall (October 2, 1909 – November 25, 1965) was an American college football player who was a quarterback for the Kentucky State Industrial College for Colored Persons (now Kentucky State University) in the mid-1930s. Nicknamed "Tarzan" for his athletic prowess, he was inducted to the College Football Hall of Fame in 2007.

== Biography ==
Kendall was born in Owensboro, Kentucky, in 1909, and attended high school there. A dominant figure in black college football in the 1930s, Kendall first played for West Kentucky Industrial College, a junior college, during the 1932 season. He then played for the Kentucky State Thorobreds during the 1933–1936 seasons. His nickname of "Tarzan" appeared in print by October 1934. While Kendall played as a halfback, football of the era included much more passing by halfbacks than in modern collegiate or professional football; various newspaper reports of the era highlighted Kendall's skill as a passer.

Kendall helped lead the 1934 Kentucky State Thorobreds to an undefeated season and consensus black college football national championship selection; the program was also named champion by some selectors in 1933 and 1935. In December 1935, the Thorobreds defeated Florida A&M in that season's Orange Blossom Classic; coverage of the game highlighted "Kendall with his sure arm, shooting bullet-like passes all over the field." Kentucky State had an overall 29–7–3 (.782) record during Kendall's playing years. He was a first-team All-America selection by Chester L. Washington, sports editor of the Pittsburgh Courier, for the 1934 to 1936 seasons. In September 1938, Kendall played on an all-star team against the Chicago Bears in an exhibition game at Soldier Field.

Following his playing career, Kendall served as a high school teacher, principal, and sports coach. He first taught in Harlan, Kentucky, interrupted by service in the United States Army during World War II. He then taught in Owensboro from 1948 until his death. Kendall died on November 25, 1965, at Owensboro Daviess County Hospital, a month after sustaining injuries in an automobile accident on U.S. Route 60 near Garfield, Kentucky. He was survived by his wife, four sons, and three daughters.

A park in Kendall's hometown of Owensboro was co-named in his honor in 1973. Kendall was inducted into the Kentucky State Athletics Hall of Fame in 1975, and was inducted to the College Football Hall of Fame in 2007, becoming the first inductee from Kentucky State. He was inducted to the Black College Football Hall of Fame in 2011.
