= Calvin King =

American farm developer

Calvin R. King (born 1953) is an American farm developer, and the President of the Arkansas Land and Farm Development Corp.

He graduated from Philander Smith College in 1975.

The agency collaborated with the Farmers Home Association to create the Outreach Training and Technical Assistance program.

== Awards ==
- 1990 MacArthur Fellows Program
- 1990 National Partnership Award, by the United States Department of Agriculture
- 1989 Arkansas Public Service Award.
