= 1948 Delaware State Hornets football team =

American college football season

1948 Delaware State Hornets football
- Conference: Colored Intercollegiate Athletic Association
- Record: 4–5 (4–4 CIAA)
- Head coach: Tom Conrad (5th season)

1948 Colored Intercollegiate Athletic Association football standings
	Conf.					Overall
Team	W		L		T	W		L		T
No. 4 West Virginia State $	5	–	1	–	0	5	–	2	–	2
Winston-Salem State	5	–	1	–	0	8	–	1	–	0
Howard	7	–	2	–	0	7	–	4	–	0
No. 8 Lincoln (PA)	4	–	2	–	0	5	–	2	–	0
North Carolina A&T	4	–	2	–	1	4	–	4	–	1
No. 9 Morgan State	5	–	3	–	0	5	–	3	–	0
Virginia State	5	–	3	–	0	5	–	3	–	0
North Carolina College	4	–	3	–	1	6	–	3	–	1
Shaw	4	–	3	–	0	4	–	3	–	0
Delaware State	4	–	4	–	0	4	–	5	–	0
No. 10 Virginia Union	3	–	5	–	0	6	–	5	–	0
Hampton	2	–	5	–	1	4	–	5	–	1
Bluefield State	1	–	5	–	0	2	–	7	–	0
Johnson C. Smith	0	–	7	–	1	0	–	7	–	1
St. Augustine's	1	–	4	–	0	4	–	4	–	0
Saint Paul's (VA)	0	–	4	–	0	0	–	4	–	0
$ – Conference champion; Rankings from the Pittsburgh Courier

The 1948 Delaware State Hornets football team represented Delaware State College—now known as Delaware State University—as a member of the Colored Intercollegiate Athletic Association (CIAA) in the 1948 college football season. The Hornets compiled a 4–5 record under coach Tom Conrad. Of their five losses, three of them were by 40 points or more.

== Schedule ==
Date	Opponent	Site	Result	Source
September 25	North Carolina College	Dover, DE	L 0–14	
October 2	vs. Morgan State	Wilmington Park; Wilmington, DE	L 0–41	
October 9	at Lincoln (PA)	Lincoln, PA	W 7–6	
October 16	Johnson C. Smith	Dover, DE	W 14–12	
October 23	at Winston-Salem	Winston-Salem, NC	L 7–12	
October 30	at Saint Paul's (VA)	Lawrenceville, VA	W 58–0	
November 6	Wilberforce State*	Dover, DE	L 0–41	
November 13	Howard	Dover, DE	L 0–40	
November 20	at St. Augustine's	Raleigh, NC	W 22–0	
*Non-conference game
