= 1935 Florida A&M Rattlers football team =

American college football season

1935 Florida A&M Rattlers football

Orange Blossom Classic, L 9–19 vs. Kentucky State
- Conference: Southern Intercollegiate Athletic Conference
- Record: 4–5 (2–4 SIAC)
- Head coach: Eugene J. Bragg (2nd season)

1935 Southern Intercollegiate Athletic Conference football standings
	Conf.					Overall
Team	W		L		T	W		L		T
Alabama State $	6	–	0	–	1	9	–	1	–	1
Morehouse	5	–	1	–	1	5	–	1	–	1
Tuskegee	5	–	2	–	0	8	–	4	–	0
Clark (GA)	2	–	1	–	2	2	–	2	–	3
LeMoyne	3	–	2	–	0	5	–	3	–	1
Florida A&M	2	–	4	–	0	4	–	5	–	0
Morris Brown	2	–	2	–	2	3	–	4	–	2
South Carolina State	2	–	3	–	0	4	–	4	–	0
Fisk	1	–	4	–	0	1	–	4	–	1
Knoxville	0	–	5	–	1	1	–	5	–	3
Talladega	1	–	2	–	1	2	–	2	–	2
Benedict	0	–	3	–	0	1	–	5	–	2
$ – Conference champion; Standings were based on Dickinson System ratings. Benedict and Talladega were not rated because they did not play the quota of five conference games.

The 1935 Florida A&M Rattlers football team represented Florida Agricultural and Mechanical College for Negroes—now known as Florida A&M University—as a member of the Southern Intercollegiate Athletic Conference (SIAC) during the 1935 college football season. Led by Eugene J. Bragg in his second and final season, the Rattlers compiled an overall record of 4–5 with a mark of 2–4, placing sixth in the SIAC standings, which were determined by Dickinson System ratings.

== Schedule ==
Date	Time	Opponent	Site	Result	Attendance	Source
October 12	3:30 p.m.	LeMoyne	Tallahassee, FL	L 13–19		
October 18	3:30 p.m.	at Alabama State	Cramton Bowl; Montgomery, AL	L 7–0		
October 26		Benedict	Tallahassee, FL	W 24–6		
November 1	2:00 p.m.	South Carolina State	Orangeburg County Negro Fair; Orangeburg, SC	L 6–7		
November 9	3:00 p.m.	Tuskegee	Campus gridiron; Tallahassee, FL	W 3–0		
November 16	3:00 p.m.	at Dillard*	Dillard Athletic Field; New Orleans, LA	W 19–6		
November 23	2:00 p.m.	at Morris Brown	Ponce de Leon Park; Atlanta, GA	L 0–21		
November 28	1:30 p.m.	Alcorn A&M*^{†}	Tallahassee, FL	W 7–0	1,000	
December 7		vs. Kentucky State*	Durkee Field; Jacksonville, FL (Orange Blossom Classic)	L 9–19	5,000	
*Non-conference game; ^{†}Homecoming; All times are in Eastern time
