= South Central Athletic Conference =

College sports conference of historically Black colleges and universities

The South Central Athletic Conference (SCAC) was an intercollegiate athletic conference of historically black colleges and universities (HBCUs) that existed from 1923 to 1962. The conference's members were located in Arkansas, Louisiana, Mississippi, and Texas.

== Member schools ==
Institution	Location	Founded	Nickname	Joined	Previous conference	Left	Subsequent conference joined	Current conference
Alcorn Agricultural and Mechanical College	Lorman, Mississippi	1871	Braves	1935	Independents	1962	SWAC	SWAC
Campbell College	Jackson, Mississippi	1890		1935	Independents	1951		closed 1964
Jackson State University	Jackson, Mississippi	1877	Tigers	1935; 1947	Independents; Independents	1940; 1952	Independents; Midwest Athletic Association	SWAC
Leland College	Baker, Louisiana	1877	Bulldogs	1935	Independents	1960	school closed	closed 1960
Okolona College	Okolona, Mississippi	1902		1935	Independents	1949		closed 1965
Rust College	Holly Springs, Mississippi	1866	Bearcats	1935	Independents	1957	Gulf Coast	NAIA
Tougaloo College	Tougaloo, Mississippi	1869	Bulldogs	1935	Independents	1957	Gulf Coast	Gulf Coast
Dillard University	New Orleans, Louisiana	1930	Bleu Devils	1946; 1954	Independents; Independents	1947; 1957	Independents; Gulf Coast	Gulf Coast
Southern Christian College	Edwards, Mississippi	1882		1947		1948		closed 1953
Philander Smith College	Little Rock, Arkansas	1877	Panthers	1948	Independents	1957	Gulf Coast	Gulf Coast
Mississippi Industrial College	Holly Springs, Mississippi	1905	Tigers	1954	Independents	1962		closed 1982
Mississippi Vocational College	Itta Bena, Mississippi	1953	Delta Devils	1954	New program	1962	Independents	SWAC
Bishop College	Marshall, Texas	1881	Tigers	1956	SWAC	1957	Gulf Coast	closed 1988
Paul Quinn College	Waco, Texas (Note: Paul Quinn's campus location is currently now in Dallas, Texas.)	1872	Tigers	1956	Independents	1961	Independents	Red River
Jarvis Christian College	Hawkins, Texas	1912	Bulldogs	1958	Independents	1962	Independents	Red River

== Football champions ==
- 1930: Tougaloo
- 1931: No champion
- 1933: Alcorn A&M
- 1934: Alcorn A&M
- 1935: Tougaloo
- 1936: Tougaloo
- 1937: Tougaloo
- 1939: Leland
- 1942: Leland
- 1943–1945: No champion
- 1946: Leland
- 1947: Alcorn A&M
- 1948: Dillard
- 1949: Alcorn A&M
- 1950: Alcorn A&M
- 1951: Alcorn A&M
- 1952: Unknown
- 1953: Unknown
- 1954: Mississippi Industrial
- 1955: Mississippi Vocational
- 1956: Mississippi Vocational
- 1957: Dillard and Mississippi Vocational
- 1958: Paul Quinn
- 1959: Mississippi Vocational
- 1960: Alcorn A&M
- 1961: Alcorn A&M
- 1963: Mississippi Vocational

== See also ==
- List of defunct college football conferences
