= David Abner Jr. =

American educator (1860–1928)

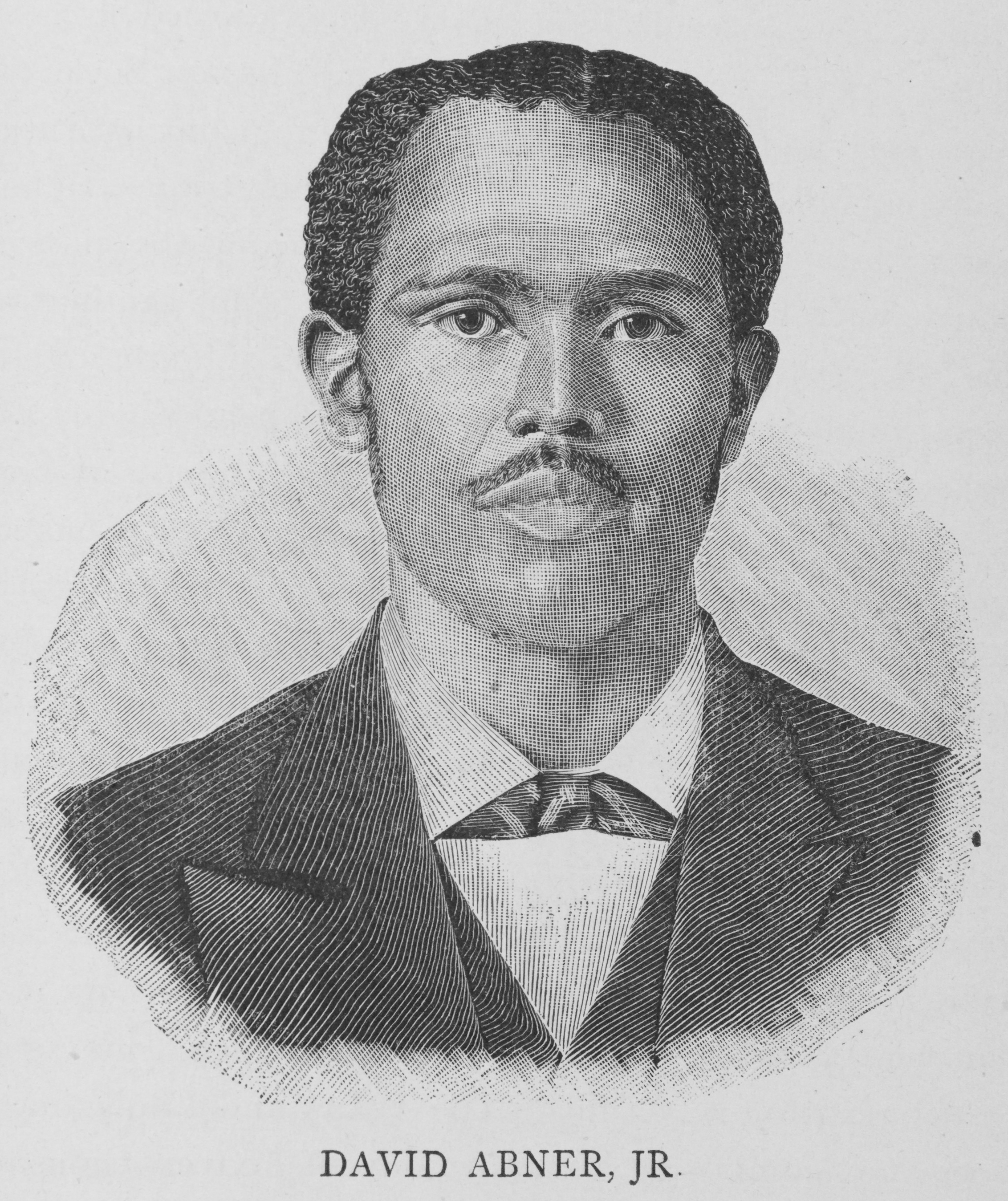
- Abner in 1887
- Born: November 25, 1860; Upshur County, Texas, US
- Died: August 21, 1928 (aged 67); Houston, Texas, US
- Occupations: Educator, journalist
- Spouse: Ella M. Wheeler (1877–1950)
- Children: 2

Religious life
- Religion: Baptist

David Abner Jr. (November 25, 1860 – July 21, 1928) was an American educator. He was the first president of Guadalupe College and then of Conroe College.

== Early life ==
David Abner Jr. was born November 25, 1860, in Upshur County, Texas, the son of David Abner and Louisa Abner. His family was enslaved until emancipation, but his father would become a delegate to the state constitutional convention and state legislature. In 1870 they moved to Marshall, Texas, where Abner attended Wiley University. He then enrolled in Straight University in New Orleans. In 1877 he enrolled at Fisk University in Nashville, Tennessee. In 1881 he enrolled at Bishop College, where he graduated in 1884, becoming the first African American to graduate from a Texas school of higher education. He then became a professor at the school. He was a delegate to the National Convention of Colored men (part of the Colored Conventions Movement) in September 1883; in 1884 he became the corresponding secretary of the Baptist State Convention of Texas. He also edited the convention's paper, known as the Baptist Journal and later as the Baptist Pilot.

== College president ==
In 1884, Guadalupe College was founded, primarily through the efforts of William B. Ball, who would later serve as president. The school opened in 1887, and Abner was made the first president of the school, a position he served until 1905, when he was forcibly removed due to opposition within the Baptist church leadership. The denomination opened a new (third) convention in the state and created a new college, Conroe College. Abner served as councilman for the Texas House of Councils. In 1906, Abner was elected the first president of Conroe College.

== Personal life ==
Abner married Ella M. Wheeler (1877–1950), with whom he had two children. He died on August 21, 1928, in Houston, Texas.

== See also ==
- Men of Mark
