= 1934 Kentucky State Thorobreds football team =

American college football season

1934 Kentucky State Thorobreds football

Black college national champion MWAA champion
- Conference: Midwest Athletic Association
- Record: 8–0 (4–0 MWAA)
- Head coach: Henry Kean (4th season)
- Home stadium: Alumni Field

The 1934 Kentucky State Thorobreds football team was an American football team that represented Kentucky State Industrial College (now known as Kentucky State University) as a member of the Midwest Athletic Association (MWAA) during the 1934 college football season. In their fourth season under head coach Henry Kean, the team compiled an 8–0 record, won the MWAA championship, shut out seven of eight opponents, and outscored all opponents by a total of 193 to 2. The team was recognized as the black college national champion. The team played its home games at Alumni Field in Frankfort, Kentucky. Notable players included Joe "Tarzan" Kendall, an inductee of the College Football Hall of Fame.

== Schedule ==
Date	Opponent	Site	Result	Attendance	Source
October 6	at West Virginia State	Institute, WV	W 14–0		
October 13	Wilberforce	Frankfort, KY	W 15–0		
October 27	vs. Tuskegee*	Crosley Field; Cincinnati, OH	W 6–2		
November 3	Morris Brown*	Alumni Field; Frankfort, KY	W 21–0		
November 10	Fisk*	Frankfort, KY	W 44–0		
November 17	at Lincoln (MO)	Jefferson City, MO	W 33–0		
November 24	Louisville Municipal	Alumni Field; Frankfort, KY	W 27–0		
December 8	at Wiley*	Fair Park Stadium; Marshall, TX	W 33–0	2,000	
*Non-conference game
