= Tennessee State Tigers football =

College football team

2026 Tennessee State Tigers football team
- First season: 1912; 114 years ago
- Athletic director: Mikki Allen
- Head coach: Reggie Barlow; 2nd season, 2–10 (.167)
- Location: Nashville, Tennessee
- Stadium: Nissan Stadium and Hale Stadium (capacity: 69,143 and 10,000)
- NCAA division: Division I FCS
- Conference: Ohio Valley
- Colors: Reflex blue and white
- All-time record: 597–339–32 (.633)
- Bowl record: 8–1–1 (.850)

Small college national championships
- 1973

Black college national championships
- 1946, 1947, 1954, 1956, 1965, 1966, 1970, 1971, 1973, 1979, 1982, 2013

Conference championships
- Midwestern: 1945, 1946, 1947, 1949, 1954, 1956, 1957, 1959, 1960, 1961, 1963, 1964, 1965, 1966 OVC: 1998, 1999 OVC–Big South: 2024
- Website: TSUTigers.com

The Tennessee State Tigers football program represents Tennessee State University in the sport of American football. The Tigers compete in the NCAA Division I Football Championship Subdivision (FCS) as a member of the Ohio Valley Conference.

== History ==
=== NCAA relegation ===
In 1981, the Tennessee State Tigers were relegated from Division I-A to Division I-AA.

=== First FBS victory ===
Tennessee State's first victory over an NCAA Division I Football Bowl Subdivision (FBS) opponents came in the opening game of the 2017 season, when the Tigers defeated the Georgia State Panthers, 17–10.

== Championships ==
=== National championships ===
Year	Coach	Record	Championship
1946	Henry A. Kean	10–1	Black College National Champions
1947	Henry A. Kean	10–0	Black College National Champions
1954	Henry A. Kean	10–1	Black College National Champions
1956	Howard C. Gentry	10–0	Black College National Champions
1965	John A. Merritt	9–0–1	Black College National Champions
1966	John A. Merritt	10–0	Black College National Champions
1970	John A. Merritt	11–0	Black College National Champions
1971	John A. Merritt	9–1	Black College National Champions
1973	John A. Merritt	10–0	AP & UPI College Division National Champions; Black College National Champions
1979	John A. Merritt	8–3	Black College National Champions
1982	John A. Merritt	10–1–1	Black College National Champions
2013	Rod Reed	10–4	Black College National Champions

=== Conference championships ===
Year	Coach	Conference	Conference record
1945	Henry A. Kean	Midwest Athletic Association	3–0
1946	Henry A. Kean	Midwestern Conference	3–0
1947	Henry A. Kean	Midwestern Conference	3–0
1949	Henry A. Kean	Midwestern Conference	4–0
1954	Henry A. Kean	Midwestern Conference	4–0
1956	Howard C. Gentry	Midwestern Conference	4–0
1957	Howard C. Gentry	Midwestern Conference	3–0
1959	Howard C. Gentry	Midwestern Conference	3–0
1960	Howard C. Gentry	Midwestern Conference	3–0
1961	Lawrence E. Simmons	Midwestern Conference	3–0
1963	John A. Merritt	Midwest Conference	3–0
1964	John A. Merritt	Midwestern Conference	3–0
1965	John A. Merritt	Midwestern Conference	2–0
1966	John A. Merritt	Midwestern Conference	2–0
1998	Lawrence C. Cole	Ohio Valley Conference	6–1
1999	Lawrence C. Cole	Ohio Valley Conference	7–0
2024	Eddie George	Big South–OVC Football Association	6–2

== Postseason appearances ==
=== Bowl games ===
Tennessee State has competed in ten bowl games and has a record of 8–1–1.

Season	Bowl	Opponent	Result
1944	Vulcan Bowl	Tuskegee	W 12–7
1945	Vulcan Bowl	Texas College	W 33–6
1946	Vulcan Bowl	Louisville Municipal College	W 32–0
1954	National Classic	North Carolina College	L 6–19
1956	Orange Blossom Classic	Florida A&M	W 41–39
1965	Grantland Rice Bowl	Ball State	T 14–14
1966	Grantland Rice Bowl	Muskingum	W 34–7
1970	Grantland Rice Bowl	Southwestern Louisiana	W 26–25
1971	Grantland Rice Bowl	McNeese State	W 26–23
1972	Pioneer Bowl	Drake	W 29–7

=== NCAA Division I-AA/FCS playoffs ===
The Tigers have made seven appearances in the NCAA Division I FCS Football Championship playoffs, with a combined record of 3–7.

Year	Round	Opponent	Result
1981	Quarterfinals	South Carolina State	L 25–26 ^{OT}
1982	Quarterfinals; Semifinals	Eastern Illinois; Eastern Kentucky	W 20–19; L 7–13
1986	First Round; Quarterfinals	Jackson State; Nevada	W 32–23; L 6–33
1998	First Round	Appalachian State	L 31–45
1999	First Round	North Carolina A&T	L 10–24
2013	First Round; Second Round	Butler; Eastern Illinois	W 31–0; L 10–51
2024	First Round	Montana	L 27–41

== College Football Hall of Fame members ==
Name	Position	Tenure	Inducted	Ref.
John Merritt	Coach	1963–1983	1994	

== Alumni in the NFL ==
Over 100 Tennessee State alumni have played in the NFL, including:

- Richard Dent
- Onzy Elam
- Joe Gilliam
- Mike Hegman
- Sylvester Hicks
- Bennie Anderson
- Claude Humphrey
- Ed "Too Tall" Jones
- Jim Kelly
- Greg Kindle
- Loaird McCreary
- Dominique Rodgers-Cromartie
- Harold Rice
- Anthony Shelton
- Jim Thaxton
- Mike Jones
- Larry Kinnebrew
- Steve Moore
- Herman Hunter
- Gilbert Renfroe
- Malcolm Taylor

== Annual Classic ==
- Southern Heritage Classic

== Future non-conference opponents ==
Announced schedules as of March 16, 2026.

2026	2027	2028	2029
Jackson State^{1}	at Jackson State	at Vanderbilt	at Middle Tennessee
at Georgia	at Tennessee	at North Carolina A&T	
at Alabama A&M	Alabama A&M	at Alabama A&M	
at Florida A&M	at Morgan State		
Morgan State	Florida A&M		

1. John A. Merritt Classic
