= Vulcan Bowl =

The Vulcan Bowl was a college football bowl game played at Rickwood Field in Birmingham, Alabama. The game was played on New Year's Day between 1941 and 1949 and again in 1952, between historically black colleges and universities (HBCUs). The game was one of the longer-lasting bowls for HBCUs established in the 1940s. The first game in the series was called the Steel Bowl, and the bowl game served as an early era black college football national championship game by matching the Southern Intercollegiate Athletic Conference champion against the best team from the other HBCU conferences. The final contest was also called the Steel Bowl and was played at Legion Field.

== Game results ==
| Date | Winner | | Loser | | Ref. |
|---|---|---|---|---|---|
| January 1, 1941 | Morris Brown | 19 | Wilberforce | 3 | |
| January 1, 1942 | Langston | 13 | Morris Brown | 0 | |
| January 1, 1943 | Texas College | 13 | Tuskegee | 10 | |
| January 1, 1944 | Tuskegee | 12 | Clark (GA) | 7 | |
| January 1, 1945 | Tennessee A&I | 13 | Tuskegee | 0 | |
| January 1, 1946 | Tennessee A&I | 33 | Texas College | 6 | |
| January 1, 1947 | Tennessee A&I | 32 | Louisville Municipal | 0 | |
| January 1, 1948 | Wilberforce State | 27 | Grambling | 21 | |
| January 1, 1949 | Kentucky State | 23 | North Carolina A&T | 13 | |
| January 1, 1952 | Bethune–Cookman | 27 | Texas College | 13 | |
