= Guadalupe College =

Private Baptist college for African Americans in Seguin, Texas

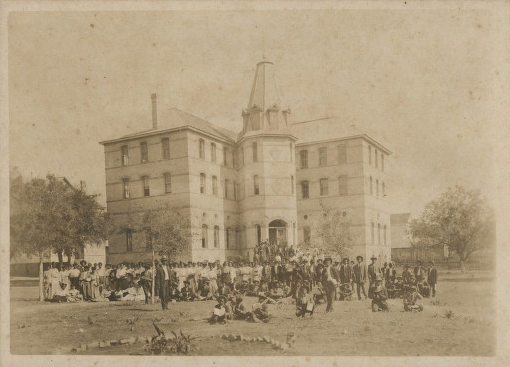
- Guadalupe College, c. 1900s
- Type: Junior college (1926–29, 1931–37); Senior college (1929–31)
- Active: 1884–1937
- Founder: William B. Ball
- Parent institution: Guadalupe Baptist Association
- Religious affiliation: Baptist
- Students: Approximately 200 (1887–1899); Approximately 300–500 (1891–1906); Approximately 60 (early 1930s)
- Location: Seguin, Texas, United States; 29°34′10″N 97°58′03″W

Guadalupe College was a private Baptist college for African Americans in Seguin, Texas. It was established in 1884 and opened officially in 1887. Its founding was chiefly due to the efforts of William B. Ball, who later became its president. David Abner Jr. was president of Guadalupe College from 1891 to 1906, a 15-year tenure during which the college flourished and gained statewide recognition. At its height during his administration, the college had an enrollment of approximately 500 students.

Guadalupe College offered a traditional liberal arts program based on classical courses, as well as an "academy" and grammar school, but comparatively little agricultural or trades-based education. It was recognized as a junior college by the Texas Department of Education in 1926 and briefly attained senior college status, from 1929 to 1931, before being adversely affected by the Great Depression. Guadalupe College's main building was destroyed by a fire in 1936 and the college became defunct in 1937 after a fundraising drive was cancelled. Numerous later attempts to reestablish the college were unsuccessful.

== History ==
=== Early history ===
Guadalupe College was established in 1884 by members of the Guadalupe Baptist Association in Seguin, Texas. The association was led chiefly by Dr. William B. Ball, an African American Civil War veteran, minister, and academic from Ohio, and Rev. Leonard Ilsley, a white preacher. Ball, the founder of the college, was a member of both the 24th Infantry Regiment and 28th Infantry Regiment of the United States Army, in which he served for three years during the American Indian Wars. In 1884, the Guadalupe Baptist Association purchased a large plot of land for $6,500, which was the site of many schools previously and is currently home to Joe F. Saegert Middle School.

In 1887, Guadalupe College's first official session was opened with J. H. Garnett serving as president. Enrollment for the first 12 years averaged over 200 students annually. On March 28, 1888, the State of Texas granted a charter to the college. Its goal was to provide the African American community with an education comparable to white institutions of the day. This curriculum at Guadalupe College consisted of four years of classical courses, which led to a bachelor of arts degree through the college department. Additionally, students could receive training and certification through five other departments: industrial, musical, preparatory, primary, and theological. Guadalupe College's early funding came from grassroots efforts of the African American community, principally donating through their churches. Additionally, philanthropist George W. Brackenridge donated considerably to the college, including giving it funds for a new chapel-auditorium and a valuable 216-acre (87 ha) tract on the Guadalupe River west of Seguin.

=== Abner era ===
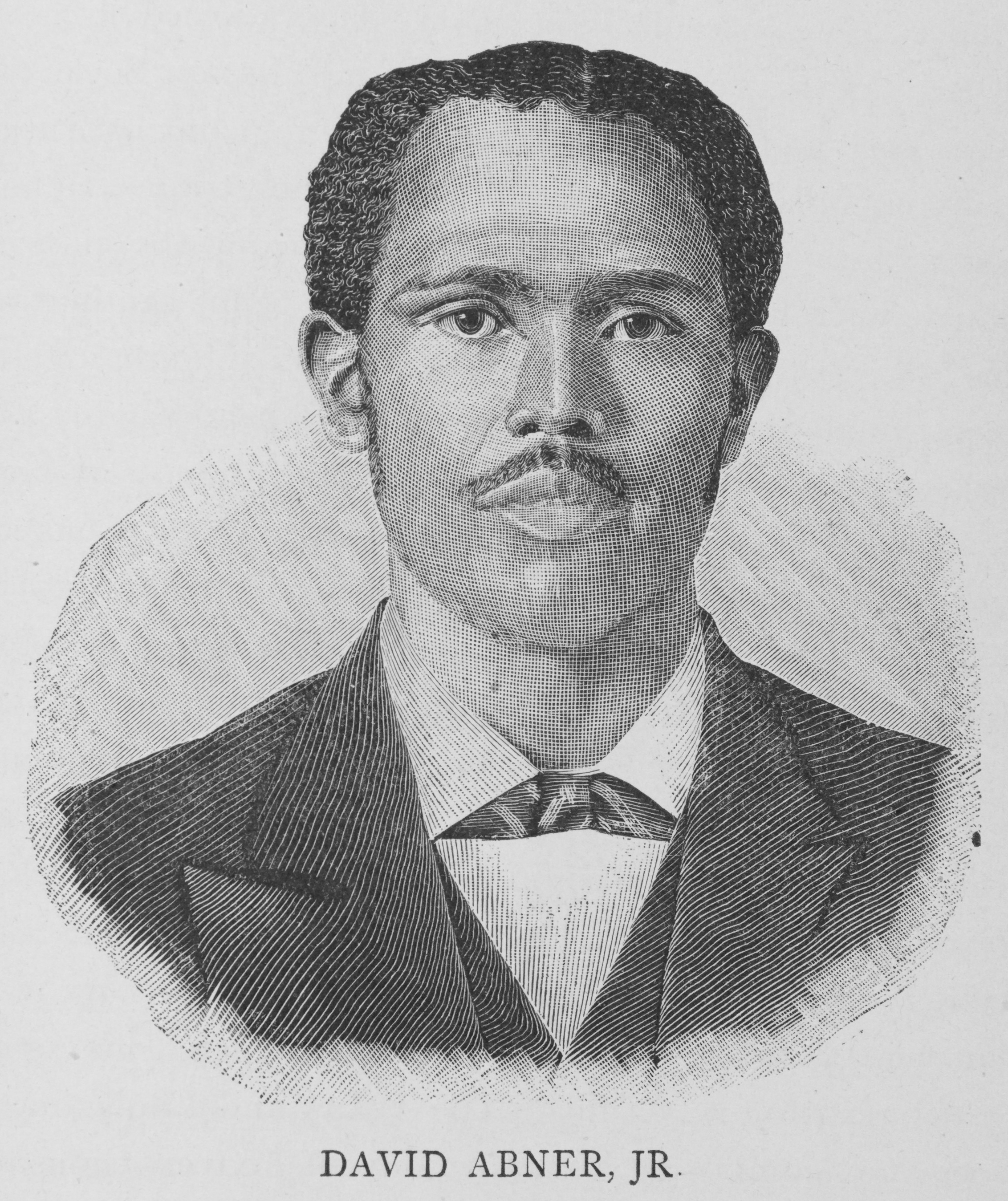
David Abner Jr., 1887

Garnett was succeeded by David Abner Jr. in 1891, marking the beginning of Abner's 15-year tenure, during which the college flourished and gained statewide recognition. During this time, attendance ranged from 300–500 students annually. Abner was the first African American to graduate from a Texas institution of higher learning. Before becoming president of Guadalupe College, he was a professor at the Baptist Home Mission Society of New York and was a delegate for Louisville, Kentucky's National Convention of Black Men. Due to his large success with the college, Abner received many offers from northern institutions. These positions reportedly offered much higher status and pay, but Abner declined them all and is quoted saying, "I am a southern man, conducting a school for the colored youths of the south and expect to remain right where I am."

=== Post-Abner era ===
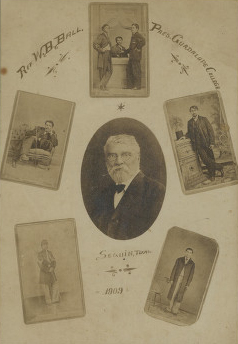
William B. Ball, circa 1909–10

In 1906, Abner resigned under pressure from the college's trustees. His successor as president, William B. Ball, entered a challenging period at Guadalupe College defined by "lawsuits, financial crises, declining enrollment, and loss of state endorsement". He served as president until 1913. By 1917, Ball had been named president emeritus of the college, with a contemporary issue of the El Paso Herald observing he was "the only negro in the world holding such title". As president emeritus, Ball earned a monthly salary of $60 until his death in 1923.

In 1914, George Brackenridge purchased the college and saved it "from financial ruin". He and the college's boosters moved it to farmland on the Guadalupe River in 1914, where two new brick buildings were built for the college: a four-story combined classroom and women's dormitory building and a three-story men's dormitory. In November 1914, William Henry Moses of Tennessee became the college's new president. Guadalupe College's traditional liberal arts program was retained alongside an "academy" and grammar school, with comparatively little agricultural or trades-based education. During this period college students were required to provide "evidence of good moral character", attend Sunday school and weekly prayer meetings, and work for the college on a daily basis.

In 1916, Marlin native Jesse Washington was named president. During his tenure, he created a bachelor of arts and science degree and organized the college's curriculum into nine divisions.

A 1921 Dallas Express article called Guadalupe College "the leading educational institution for Negroes in this section of the state". That year, former Prairie View A&M College professor Charles H. Griggs succeeded Washington as Guadalupe College president. In 1926, the Texas Department of Education recognized Guadalupe College as a "standard junior college" and accepted its teacher education credits, which bolstered its enrollment.

In 1927, Florida native F. G. S. Everett was named president of Guadalupe College. During his tenure, a two-story president's house was built on campus. In May 1929, Guadalupe was officially recognized as a senior college. By the early 1930s, enrollment in the college was averaging about 60 students annually, with another 125 or so in the "academy" division.

Guadalupe College was adversely affected by the Great Depression and reverted to its previous status as a junior college in 1931. In 1930, J. R. Lockett became the college's next president. On February 9, 1936, the main college building was destroyed in a fire. A fundraising drive was cancelled in 1937 and the college ceased operations.

While the General Baptist Convention did build a new building and held classes for both ministers and laypeople on the site in the 1940s, a fully accredited college was never reestablished after the fire. Furthermore, while the Texas Secretary of State issued a new charter in 1971 to the "College of the Guadalupe Baptist Association" and alumni succeeded in refurbishing a wooden chapel for group meetings, no regularly scheduled classes were ever held.

== Legacy ==
Alumnus Henry F. Wilson coordinated a reunion of about 200 former students and their families on July 26, 1979. The event was held in the Seguin-Guadalupe County Coliseum and included a tour of the campus, signing of college songs, recognition of attendees, and speeches covering the history, goals, and status of the college. The oldest former student in attendance was Mozella Allen, 91, who graduated from Guadalupe College sometime around 1900. Estella P. Burns, the oldest living former Guadalupe College teacher, was also in attendance. Participants on the tour visited the college's former auditorium, an unfinished building on which construction was started after the fire, and former college buildings that were converted into a religious education school. The reunion became an annual event that continued drawing former students, teachers, and their families. The last confirmed reunion was held in 1986 and drew about 35 former students. By 1985, the only remaining building on the former campus was a chapel, but alumni endeavored to start a trade school on the property and raise cattle. They made progress towards this goal when, in 1986, they raised enough money to run a water line onto the land. At the 1985 reunion, Henry F. Wilson, who by this time was the president of the Guadalupe College Ex-Student Association, said "We want to leave a landmark for our people and provide models for our race to follow."

By 1995, The Guadalupe Baptist District Association College Inc. had joined in the reconstruction efforts with the goal of moving Guadalupe Baptist Seminary from San Antonio to the former Guadalupe College campus in Seguin by 1997. In 1997, the school's representatives made attempts to sell portions of the land to generate funds for the project.

== Notable alumni ==
- Maud A. B. Fuller (1868–1972), Baptist leader and educator
