= Philander Smith University =

Historially Black university in Little Rock, Arkansas, US

Coordinates: 34.73686°N 92.28249°W

- Former names: Walden Seminary (1877–1882); Philander Smith College (1882–2023)
- Type: Private historically black college
- Established: 1877
- Accreditation: HLC
- Religious affiliation: United Methodist Church
- Academic affiliations: UNCF
- Endowment: $3 million
- President: Maurice D. Gipson
- Students: 866
- Location: Little Rock, Arkansas, U.S.
- Colors: Green and gold
- Nickname: Panthers
- Sporting affiliations: NAIA – HBCUAC
- Website: www.philander.edu

Philander Smith University (previously Philander Smith College) is a private historically black college in Little Rock, Arkansas. It is affiliated with the United Methodist Church and is a founding member of the United Negro College Fund (UNCF). Philander Smith University is accredited by the Higher Learning Commission.

== History ==
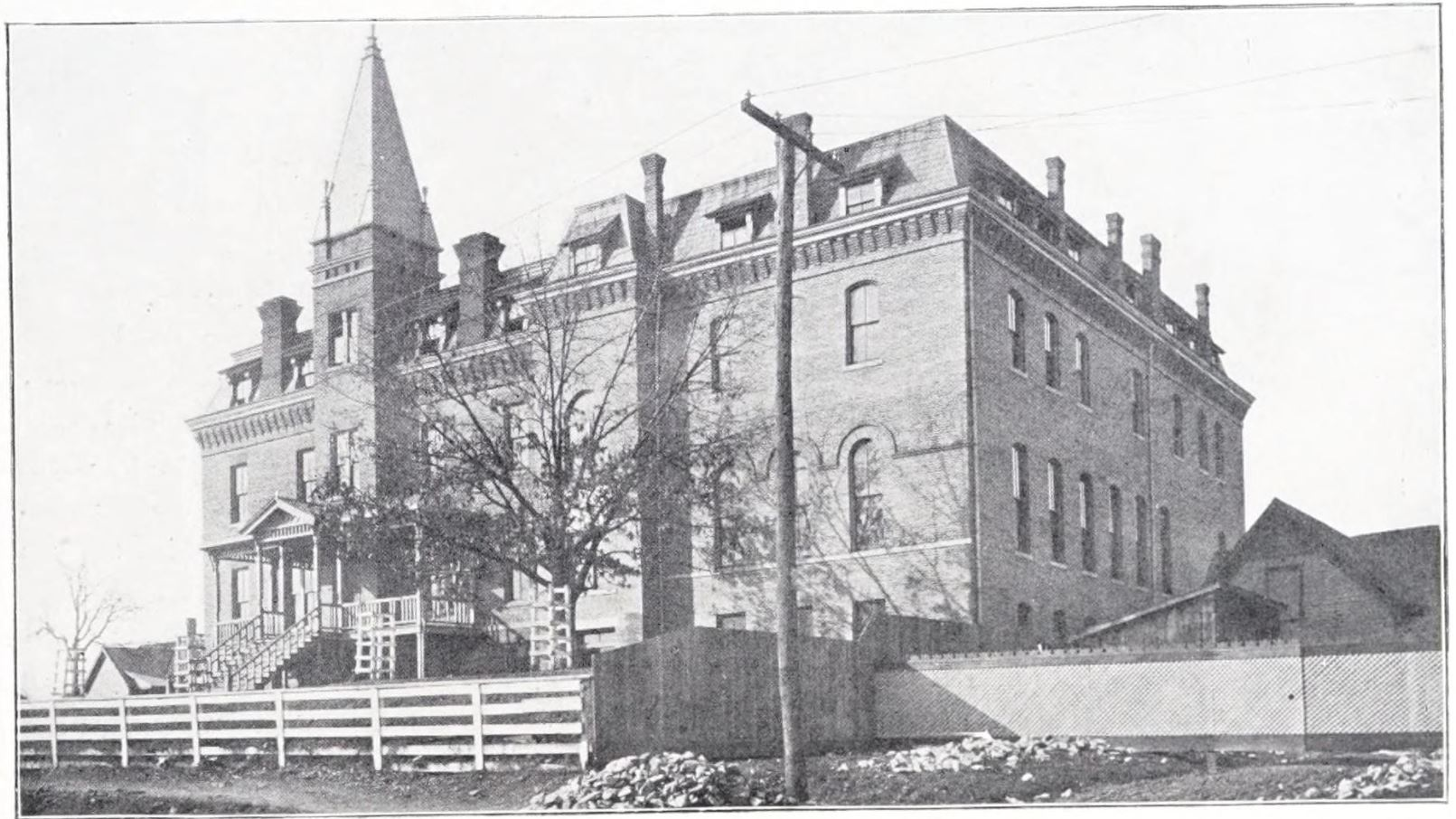
Budlong Hall, c. 1910. Built 1883, demolished 1963.

Philander Smith University was officially founded in 1877 under the name of Walden Seminary to provide educational opportunities for emancipated slaves west of the Mississippi River. In 1882 the school was renamed Philander Smith College in honor of the financial contributions of Adeline Smith, widow of Philander Smith. It was chartered as a four-year college in 1883 and conferred its first bachelor's degree in 1888. In 1933, it merged the assets of the George R. Smith College in Sedalia, Missouri, which burned down in 1925. In 1943, Philander Smith was accredited by the North Central Association of Colleges and Schools.

During the Civil Rights Movement, Philander Smith College was a pioneer in activism: many of its students engaged in nonviolent resistance against segregation laws or customs (such as sitting in at "whites-only" lunch counters).

In 1998, Trudie Kibbe Reed became the first woman president of the college.

On August 1, 2023, the college announced the addition of its first master's degree program and the change of its name from Philander Smith College to Philander Smith University.

In 2025, MacKenzie Scott donated $19 million to the university which is the largest single gift in its history.

=== Rankings and education conservancy ===
Walter Kimbrough, former president of Philander Smith College, joined the Education Conservancy in criticizing the annual U.S. News & World Report college rankings; he signed a letter circulating among college presidents that asks them to refrain from participating in the peer assessment portion of the survey.

== Campus ==
- Philander Smith College Historic District
- U.S. National Register of Historic Places
- U.S. Historic district
- Location: Roughly bounded by 13th, 11th, Izard, and State Sts., Little Rock, Arkansas
- Area: less than one acre
- Architect: Almand, John Parks
- Architectural style: Colonial Revival, Bungalow/Craftsman, et al.
- NRHP reference No.: 99000229
- Added to NRHP: September 13, 1999

Campus

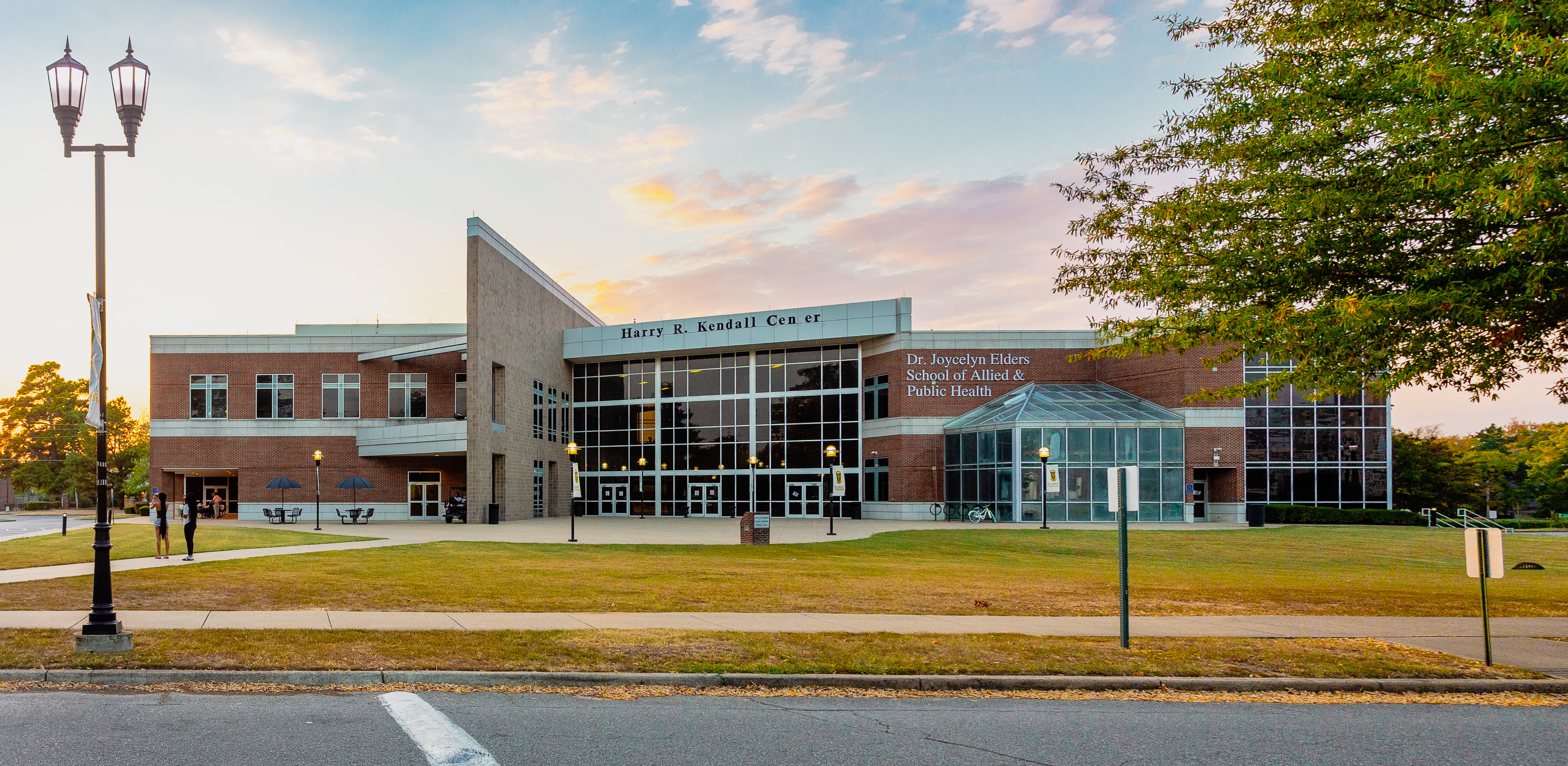
Harry R. Kendall Center, home to the Dr. Joycelyn Elders School of Allied and Public Health.

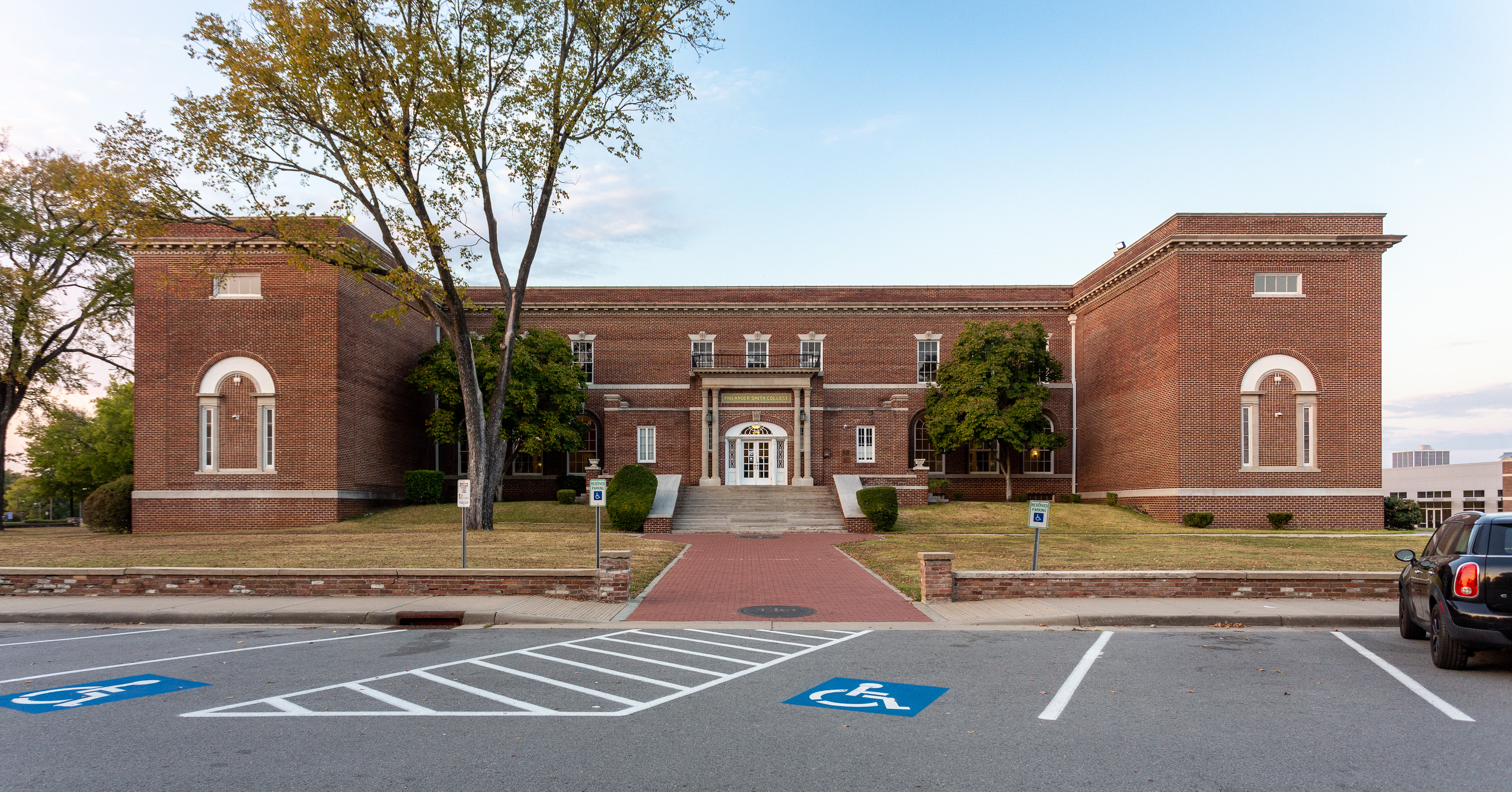
Cox Administration Building

The school campus is located in central Little Rock. Interstate 630 (the Mills Freeway) was constructed just north of the campus, which is bounded by 10th and 14th streets to the north and south, and Gaines and Chester streets to the east and west. The core of the campus was originally built for Little Rock Junior College (now the University of Arkansas at Little Rock), and a two-block section of it is listed on the National Register of Historic Places. One of its centerpieces is the former U.M. Rose School building, now the Cox Administration Building, designed by the noted Arkansas architect John Parks Almand in 1915, when he was working for Charles L. Thompson. The campus also includes the "Old Gym", a gymnasium built by the WPA during the Great Depression; and a former barracks building of the Camp Robinson Air Force Base, which was moved here in 1948.

== Athletics ==
The Philander Smith athletic teams are called the Panthers. The college is a member of the National Association of Intercollegiate Athletics (NAIA), primarily competing in the HBCU Athletic Conference (HBCUAC), formerly the Gulf Coast Athletic Conference (GCAC), since the 2011–12 academic year. The Panthers previously competed as an NAIA Independent within the Association of Independent Institutions (AII) from 2009–10 to 2010–11.

Philander Smith competes in ten intercollegiate varsity sports: Men's sports include basketball, baseball, cross country and track & field (indoor and outdoor); while women's sports include basketball, cross country, track & field (indoor and outdoor) and volleyball; and co-ed sports include cheerleading.

=== Accomplishments ===
The 2012–13 Philander Smith men's basketball team made history by bringing home their first GCAC conference tournament title.

On February 21, 1989, the Philander Smith women's basketball team won 92–89 victory against Rust College of Holly Springs, Mississippi.

== Notable alumni ==
Name	Class year	Notability	Reference(s)
"Geese" Ausbie	1960	former Harlem Globetrotters player and coach	
Al Bell		founder of Stax Records and former president of Motown Records	
John A. Bell	1951	Director of the Education and Secondary Education Division of the Office of Civil Rights, United States Department of Health, Education, and Welfare	
Isaac M. Burgan		President of Paul Quinn College from 1883–1891, 1911–1914	
Deon Cole		comedian	
James Hal Cone	1958	major figure in systematic theology and liberation theology	
L. Clifford Davis	1945	civil rights, attorney, judge	
Joycelyn Elders	1952	former Surgeon General of the United States	
Stephanie Flowers	1975	Arkansas State Senator since 2011 and former member of the Arkansas House of Representatives from Pine Bluff	
Scipio Africanus Jones	coursework before transfer to Shorter College	lawyer and businessman	
Calvin King	1975	farm developmer, and the President of the Arkansas Land and Farm Development Corp	
Amina Claudine Myers		musician	
Elijah Pitts	1961	former Green Bay Packers player, 2x Super Bowl champion	
Devon Scott		basketball player in the Israel Basketball Premier League	
Lottie Shackelford	1979	former mayor of Little Rock, Arkansas	
Robert L. Williams	1953	prominent figure in the history of African-American psychology	

== Notable faculty ==
Name	Department	Notability	Reference
Lee Lorch		mathematician and civil rights activist	
Georg Iggers		historian	10

== See also ==
- National Register of Historic Places listings in Little Rock, Arkansas
