= Kentucky State Thorobreds football =

College football team for Kentucky State University

- First season: 1907; 119 years ago
- Athletic director: Grant Stepp
- Head coach: Felton Huggins; 3rd season, 17–16 (.515)
- Location: Frankfort, Kentucky
- Stadium: Alumni Field
- Conference: SIAC
- Division: West Division
- Colors: Green and gold
- All-time record: 388–461–27 (.458)
- Bowl record: 4–4 (.500)

National championships
- Claimed: 3 (1934, 1935, 1937)

Conference championships
- 6
- Consensus All-Americans
- Website: ksuthorobreds.com

The Kentucky State Thorobreds football program represents Kentucky State University in the sport of American football. The Thorobreds compete in the Division II (D2) of the National Collegiate Athletic Association (NCAA) and the Western Division of the Southern Intercollegiate Athletic Conference (SIAC).

The Thorobreds have competed in football as members of SIAC since the 1996 NCAA Division II football season (in 1995, their games against other members of SIAC were treated as non-conference contests). From 1967 to 1984, the program competed in the National Association of Intercollegiate Athletics (NAIA) as a football independent. The program competed in the Midwest Athletic Association (MAA) in earlier years, including during its 1934 and 1935 seasons.

== Playoff appearances ==
=== NCAA Division II ===
The Thorobreds have made two appearances in the NCAA Division II playoffs, with a combined record of 0–1.

Year	Round	Opponent	Result
2025	First Round	Newberry	L, 24–45
2026	First Round	Carson–Newman	TBP
