= Midwest Athletic Association =

The Midwest Athletic Association (MWAA or MAA), also known as the Midwestern Athletic Association and the Mid-Western Athletic Association, was an intercollegiate athletic conference of historically black colleges and universities (HBCUs) that existed from 1926 to 1970. It was later known as the Midwest Conference from 1962 to 1963 and as the Midwestern Conference from 1964 to 1970. The conference's membership was widespread due to the lack of HBCUs in the Midwest, with members located in Arkansas, Kentucky, Louisiana, Mississippi, Missouri, Ohio, Tennessee, West Virginia, and Texas.

Lincoln University of Jefferson City, Missouri was admitted to the conference on December 10, 1932.

== Members ==
Institution	Location	Founded	Nickname	Joined	Previous conference	Left	Conference joined	Current conference
Bluefield State College^{1}	Bluefield, WV	1895	Big Blues	1926	Independents	1932	CIAA	CIAA (DII)
Kentucky State College^{2}	Frankfort, KY	1886	Thorobreds	1926	Independents	1970	Independents (GLVC 1989)	SIAC (DII)
West Virginia State College^{3}	Institute, WV	1891	Yellow Jackets	1926	Independents	1942	CIAA	MEC (DII)
Wilberforce University	Wilberforce, OH	1856	Bulldogs^{4}	1926	Independents	1970	Independents (AMEC 1999)	HBCUAC (NAIA)
Tennessee State University^{5}	Nashville, TN	1912	Tigers	1934	SIAC	1966	Independents (OVC 1986)	OVC (D1)
Louisville Municipal College	Louisville, KY	1931	Bantams	1931	none (new school)	1951	none (school closed)	merged into Louisville
Lincoln University	Jefferson City, MO	1866	Blue Tigers	1932	Independents	1970	MIAA	GLVC (DII)
Philander Smith College	Little Rock, AR	1877	Panthers	1940	Independents	1948	SCAC	HBCUAC (NAIA)
Central State University^{6}	Wilberforce, OH	1887	Marauders^{7}	1947	none (new school)	1970	Independents (AMEC 2000)	SIAC (DII)
Grambling College	Grambling, LA	1901	Tigers	1952	Independents	1958	SWAC	SWAC (DI)
Jackson College	Jackson, MS	1877	Tigers	1952	SCAC	1958	SWAC	SWAC (DI)
Texas Southern University	Houston, TX	1949	Tigers	1952	Independents	1954	SWAC	SWAC (DI)
Huston–Tillotson College	Austin, TX	1875	Rams	1954	SWAC	1956	Independents (GCAC 1957)	HBCUAC (NAIA)

1. Known as Bluefield Institute until 1931.
2. Known as Kentucky State Industrial College until 1938.
3. Known as West Virginia Institute until 1929.
4. Team name was Green Wave until 1947.
5. Known as Tennessee A&I State College until 1968.
6. Known as Wilberforce State College until 1951, and Central State College until 1965.
7. Known as Green Wave until 1951.

== Football champions ==
=== Midwest Athletic Association ===
- 1926: Wilberforce
- 1927: Bluefield
- 1928: Bluefield
- 1929: Wilberforce
- 1930: Wilberforce
- 1931: Wilberforce
- 1932: Kentucky State
- 1933: Wilberforce
- 1934: Kentucky State
- 1935: Wilberforce
- 1936: West Virginia State
- 1937: Kentucky State
- 1938: Kentucky State
- 1939: Wilberforce
- 1940: Wilberforce
- 1941: Kentucky State
- 1942: Kentucky State
- 1943: No champion
- 1944: No champion
- 1945: Tennessee A&I
- 1946: Tennessee A&I
- 1947: Tennessee A&I
- 1948: Wilberforce State
- 1949: Tennessee A&I
- 1950: Wilberforce State
- 1951: Central State (OH)
- 1952: Lincoln (MO) and Texas Southern
- 1953: Lincoln (MO)
- 1954: Tennessee A&I
- 1955: Grambling
- 1956: Tennessee A&I
- 1957: Jackson State and Tennessee A&I
- 1958: Lincoln (MO)
- 1959: Tennessee A&I
- 1960: Tennessee A&I
- 1961: Tennessee A&I

=== Midwest Conference ===
- 1962: Lincoln (MO)
- 1963: Tennessee A&I

=== Midwestern Conference ===
- 1964: Tennessee A&I
- 1965: Tennessee A&I
- 1966: Tennessee A&I

== See also ==
- List of defunct college football conferences
