= Edward Clemons =

American football (c. 1903 – 1966)

Biographical details
- Born: c. 1903
- Died: February 27, 1966; Jacksonville, Florida, U.S.
- Education: Morris Brown College (1929)

Playing career
- 1922–1925: Paul Quinn
- c. 1928: Morris Brown
- Position: Tackle

Coaching career (HC unless noted)
- 1929–1931: Edward Waters
- 1932: Rust
- 1936–1948: Lane
- 1950–1962: Morris Brown
- 1963: Jackson State
- 1965: Edward Waters

Head coaching record
- Bowls: 1–5

Accomplishments and honors

Championships
- 1 black college national (1951); 1 SIAC (1951); 1 SEAC (1965)

Edward James "Ox" Clemons (c. 1903 – February 27, 1966) was an American college football coach. He served as the head football coach at Edward Waters College in Jacksonville, Florida from 1929 to 1931 and again in 1965, Rust College in Holly Springs, Mississippi for one season, in 1932, Lane College in Jackson, Tennessee from 1936 to 1948, Morris Brown College in Atlanta from 1950 to 1962, and Jackson State University in Jackson, Mississippi in 1963.

Clemons played football as a tackle, first at Paul Quinn College in Dallas, from 1922 to 1925 under brothers Fred T. Long and Harry Long. In 1926, Chief Aiken, head coach at Atlanta University, convinced Clemons and several other Paul Quinn players to leave Texas for Atlanta. Clemons ultimately ended up at Morris Brown College, where he started alongside Billy Nicks. After coaching at Edward Waters and Rust, Clemons was hired to lead the athletic department at Lane, in 1936.

Clemons died on February 27, 1966, at a hospital in Jacksonville, after a short illness.

== Head coaching record ==
Year	Team	Overall	Conference	Standing	Bowl/playoffs
Edward Waters Tigers (Southern Intercollegiate Athletic Conference) (1929–1931)
1929	Edward Waters				
1930	Edward Waters	7–1–1	2–1	T–4th	
1931	Edward Waters	6–2–1	0–1	T–9th	
Rust Bearcats () (1932)
1932	Rust				
Rust:					
Lane Dragons (Southern Intercollegiate Athletic Conference) (1936–1948)
1936	Lane	6–1–2	2–1–1		
1937	Lane	5–2–1	1–2		
1938	Lane	4–3	3–2	7th	
1939	Lane	4–3–1	2–2–1	4th	
1940	Lane	5–3–1	2–2–1	7th	
1941	Lane	6–3–1	4–1–1		L Flower
1942	Lane	6–4	4–1	T–3rd	L Peach Blossom Classic
1943	No team—World War II				
1944	No team—World War II				
1945	Lane	3–2	1–0	NA	L Flower
1946	Lane	8–2	6–0	2nd	L Cattle Bowl
1947	Lane	6–4	2–2	7th	L Flower
1948	Lane	7–1–1	4–0–1	2nd	
Lane:					
Morris Brown Wolverines (Southern Intercollegiate Athletic Conference) (1950–1962)
1950	Morris Brown	7–3	5–2	T–3rd	
1951	Morris Brown	10–1	8–0	1st	W Tropical
1952	Morris Brown	7–3	4–2	T–6th	
1953	Morris Brown	4–5–1	3–1–1	2nd	
1954	Morris Brown	5–3	5–1	2nd	
1955	Morris Brown	6–3	5–1	4th	
1956	Morris Brown	5–3	4–2	T–4th	
1957	Morris Brown	5–2–1	4–1–1	2nd	
1958	Morris Brown	4–5	2–4	10th	
1959	Morris Brown	6–3	4–2	4th	
1960	Morris Brown	4–6	3–4	10th	
1961	Morris Brown	5–4	4–2	4th	
1962	Morris Brown	4–5	2–4	10th	
Morris Brown:		72–46–2	48–24–2		
Jackson State Tigers (Southwestern Athletic Conference) (1963)
1963	Jackson State	4–5	2–5	T–6th	
Jackson State:		4–5	2–5		
Edward Waters Tigers (Southeastern Athletic Conference) (1965)
1965	Edward Waters	7–2	3–0	1st	
Edward Waters:					
Total:					
National championship Conference title Conference division title or championship game berth
