= 1964 Edward Waters Tigers football team =

American college football season

1964 Edward Waters Tigers football

SEAC champion
- Conference: Southeastern Athletic Conference
- Record: 9–0 (4–0 SEAC)
- Head coach: Clifford Paul (3rd season)

The 1964 Edward Waters Tigers football team was an American football team that represented Edward Waters College (EWC), a historically-black college with 1,200 students in Jacksonville, Florida, as a member of the Southeastern Athletic Conference (SEAC) during the 1964 NAIA football season. In their third and final year under head coach Clifford Paul, the Tigers compiled a perfect 9–0 record and outscored opponents by a total of 498 to 20. The team shut out six of nine opponents and set a single-game school scoring record with 142 points against the Friendship Tigers. The Tigers were described as "the Cinderella team of Negro football in 1964"

Running back Jim "Cannonball" Butler starred for the 1964 team and became is the only EWC alumnus to play in the National Football League (NFL).

== Schedule ==
Date	Opponent	Site	Result	Source
September 19	Voorhees*	Jacksonville, FL	W 56–6	
October 3	Savannah State	Jacksonville, FL	W 24–8	
October 10	at Albany State	Albany, GA	W 12–0	
October 17	Lane*	Jacksonville, FL	W 72–0	
October 24	Claflin	Jacksonville, FL	W 50–6	
October 31	vs. Mississippi Industrial*	Municipal Stadium; Palm Beach, FL (Gold Coast Classic)	W 32–0	
November 7	Saint Paul's (VA)*^{†}	Jacksonville, FL	W 70–0	
November 22	Friendship*	Jacksonville, FL	W 142–0	
November 26	at Morris	Sumter, SC	W 36–0	
*Non-conference game; ^{†}Homecoming
