= 1945 Allen Yellow Jackets football team =

American college football season

1945 Allen Yellow Jackets football

Cotton-Tobacco Bowl, L 6–18 vs. Johnson C. Smith
- Conference: Southeastern Athletic Conference
- Record: 8–1–1 (4–0 SEAC)
- Head coach: William W. Lawson (3rd season)

The 1945 Allen Yellow Jackets football team was an American football team that represented Allen University of Columbia, South Carolina, in the Southeastern Athletic Conference (SEAC) during the 1945 college football season. The team compiled an 8–1–1 record, lost to Johnson C. Smith in the Cotton-Tobacco Bowl, and outscored opponents by a total of 255 to 36.

== Schedule ==
Date	Opponent	Site	Result	Attendance	Source
September 29	Johnson C. Smith*	Hurst Field; Columbia, SC	W 7–0		
October 6	at Morris Brown*	Ponce de Leon Park; Atlanta, GA	T 0–0		
October 25	Florida Normal	Hurst Field; Columbia, SC	W 20–0		
October 27	at Paine	Augusta, GA	W 47–0	2,000	
November 3	Morris	Hurst Field; Columbia, SC	W 50–0		
November 10	Edward Waters*	Hurst Field; Columbia, SC	W 34–0	3,000	
November 17	at Bethune–Cookman	Tampa, FL	W 31–0		
November 22	Fayetteville State*	Hurst Field; Columbia, SC	W 40–12		
December 1	vs. Knoxville*	Withrow Stadium; Cincinnati, OH	W 12–0		
January 1, 1946	at Johnson C. Smith*	Memorial Stadium; Greensboro, NC (Cotton-Tobacco Bowl)	L 6–18	5,000	
*Non-conference game
