= Oliver C. Dawson =

American athlete and sports coach (1910–1989)

Biographical details
- Born: September 7, 1910; Hampton, Georgia, U.S.
- Died: February 9, 1989 (aged 78); Orangeburg, South Carolina, U.S.

Playing career

Football
- 1931–1933: John Carroll

Basketball
- 1931–1934: John Carroll

Tennis
- 1932/3–1934: John Carroll
- Positions: Fullback (football); Guard (basketball)

Coaching career (HC unless noted)

Football
- 1935–1936: South Carolina State (backfield)
- 1937–1950 (Note: Football was not played from 1943 to 1945 due to World War II.): South Carolina State

Basketball
- 1936–1947: South Carolina State

Track
- Unknown: South Carolina State

Tennis
- Unknown (Note: Dawson coached tennis for seven years, but the dates are unknown.): South Carolina State

Golf
- Unknown (Note: Dawson coached golf for six years, but the dates are unknown.): South Carolina State

Administrative career (AD unless noted)
- 1937–? (Note: Dawson served as athletic director for 16 years, but the dates are unknown.): South Carolina State

Head coaching record
- Overall: 43–40–11 (football)
- Bowls: 2–0

Accomplishments and honors

Awards
- South Carolina Athletic Hall of Fame (1974); South Carolina State Athletic Hall of Fame (1983); John Carroll Athletic Hall of Fame (1984)

Oliver Cromwell Dawson (September 7, 1910 – February 9, 1989) was an American athlete and sports coach. After playing several sports at John Carroll University, he served as a coach and athletic director for the South Carolina State Bulldogs from 1935 to 1976. The Bulldogs' Oliver C. Dawson Stadium is named in his honor.

== Early life and education ==
Dawson was born on September 7, 1910. He grew up in Ohio and attended Collinwood High School in Cleveland, where he played several sports. He played at fullback in football for three seasons, at guard in basketball as a starter for three years, and participated in several track and field events. He led his basketball teams to undefeated records in all three seasons and in track and field set a state record in the 440-yard dash. Dawson also participated in 100-yard dash events as well as the 220. He also was a boxer during this time, and once held the heavyweight championship of Cleveland.

Dawson later attended John Carroll University, where he played three years of football, two or three years of tennis, (Note: The John Carroll Blue Streaks website and an article from The Times and Democrat conflict.) and three years of basketball. He has been called "perhaps John Carroll's most versatile star athlete of all time." Playing fullback in football, he finished with a career average of 5.5 yards-per-carry, and led the team in scoring as a junior and senior. Dawson played his last football game in November 1933.

In basketball, Dawson played guard for the 1931–32, 1932–33, and 1933–34 teams, serving as their team captain in the last. As a tennis player, he began with singles before moving on to doubles; while playing singles he ranked number one at the school. Dawson was inducted into the John Carroll University Athletic Hall of Fame in 1984, the first African-American ever to earn the honor.

== Coaching career ==
Dawson transferred to South Carolina State College following his time at John Carroll and graduated in 1936. It was here where he coached five different sports and served as athletic director across a period that spanned from 1935 to 1976, winning championships in all but one of those sports. Dawson served as head coach for the men's basketball team, football team, golf team, track team, and tennis team, and for 16 years was director of athletics. He succeeded Robert A. Brooks as athletic director in 1937.

In football, Dawson served as the backfield coach from 1935 until his graduation. He was promoted to head football coach in 1937, and served in the position through 1950. The 1943 through 1945 seasons were cancelled due to World War II. His 1947 team played for the black college national championship. Among notable football players he coached or recruited included Marion Motley and Deacon Jones, both of whom went on to be Pro Football Hall of Famers.

Described as being one of the most "versatile" coaches, Dawson also served as the head basketball coach from 1936 to 1947, winning the school's first ever SIAC title in 1943 in any sport. For seven years, he coached tennis, leading the team to four conference championships; among the players he coached was George Stewart, a national champion in the American Tennis Association (ATA). Dawson also coached the golf team for six seasons and led them to four conference titles. He was head athletic director for 16 years and also served as a professor at the school, initiating in 1947 the health and physical education program while serving as its chairman for 30 years. He retired from South Carolina State in 1976.

== Honors, personal life and death ==
Dawson was inducted into the South Carolina Athletic Hall of Fame in 1974, the first black person ever to receive the honor. He was inducted into the South Carolina State Athletic Hall of Fame in 1983, as a charter member. Oliver C. Dawson Stadium, South Carolina State's home football venue, was renamed in his honor in 1984. Dawson attended St. Luke Presbyterian Church, where he was an elder, and was a member of the Hillcrest Recreational Facility Commission for 17 years. Dawson died on February 9, 1989, at the age of 78.

== Head coaching record ==
=== Football ===
Year	Team	Overall	Conference	Standing	Bowl/playoffs
South Carolina State Bulldogs (Southern Intercollegiate Athletic Conference) (1937–1950)
1937	South Carolina State	5–3–2	2–2–1		
1938	South Carolina State	3–5	2–3	T–8th	
1939	South Carolina State	4–3–1	3–3–1	8th	
1940	South Carolina State	3–6	1–5	11th	
1941	South Carolina State	4–3–2	1–2–2		
1942	South Carolina State	4–2–1	4–2–1	6th	
1943	No team—World War II				
1944	No team—World War II				
1945	No team—World War II				
1946	South Carolina State	5–3–1	4–3–1	4th	W Pecan
1947	South Carolina State	7–1–2	5–0–2	2nd	W Pecan
1948	South Carolina State	4–3–1	3–1–1	4th	
1949	South Carolina State	3–4–1	2–2–1	T–8th	
1950	South Carolina State	1–7	1–6	14th	
South Carolina State:		43–40–11	28–29–10		
Total:		43–40–11			
