= 1946 Florida Normal Lions football team =

American college football season

1946 Florida Normal Lions football

Tropical Bowl, W 33–6 vs. Morris Flower Bowl, L 6–7 vs. Delaware State
- Conference: Southeastern Athletic Conference
- Record: 6–3–1 (3–1–1 SEAC)
- Head coach: Freeman W. Hinson (3rd season)

1946 Southeastern Athletic Conference football standings
| | Conf. | | | | | Overall |
| Team | W | | L | | T | W | | L | | T |
|---|---|---|---|---|---|---|---|---|---|---|
| No. 11 Allen $ | 5 | – | 0 | – | 0 | 8 | – | 2 | – | 0 |
| No. 12 Bethune–Cookman | 3 | – | 1 | – | 1 | 7 | – | 1 | – | 1 |
| Florida Normal | 3 | – | 1 | – | 1 | 6 | – | 3 | – | 1 |
| Paine | 3 | – | 2 | – | 1 | ? | – | ? | – | ? |
| Georgia State | 2 | – | 2 | – | 1 | 3 | – | 2 | – | 2 |
| Morris | 2 | – | 4 | – | 0 | ? | – | ? | – | ? |
| Claflin | 1 | – | 4 | – | 0 | 1 | – | 6 | – | 1 |
| Fort Valley State | 0 | – | 2 | – | 0 | 0 | – | 9 | – | 0 |
| Albany State | 0 | – | 3 | – | 0 | 0 | – | 7 | – | 0 |
$ – Conference champion; Rankings from Pittsburgh Courier Dickinson System

The 1946 Florida Normal Lions football team was an American football team that represented Florida Normal and Industrial Memorial College (now known as Florida Memorial University) in the Southeastern Athletic Conference (SEAC) during the 1946 college football season. Led by head coach F. W. Hinson, the Lions compiled an overall record of 6–3–1 with a mark of 3–1–1 in conference play, tying for second place in the SEAC. Florida Normal had a 101-point victory over Albany State and a one-point loss to black college national champion Delaware State in the Flower Bowl on New Year's Day 1947. The team's appearance in the Flower Bowl was the first time a Florida team played in a New Year's Day game.

Florida Normal's Joe Carter led the nation in scoring with 152 points on 21 touchdowns and 25 extra points. Two Florida Normal players were named to the 1946 All-Southeast Conference football team: Carter at quarterback and Danly Smith at tackle.

== Schedule ==
| Date | Time | Opponent | Site | Result | Attendance | Source |
|---|---|---|---|---|---|---|
| October 5 | | Fort Benning* | Bunker Hill; St. Augustine, FL | L 6–12 | | |
| October 11 | 2:30 p.m. | at Friendship* | Friendship Field; Rock Hill, SC | W 64–0 | | |
| October 26 | 2:30 p.m. | Allen^{†} | Bunker Hill; St. Augustine, FL | L 6–12 | | |
| November 2 | | at Morris | Sumter, SC | W 54–0 | | |
| | | Claflin | | W 19–0 | | |
| November 16 | | at Albany State | Albany, GA | W 101–0 | | |
| November 22 | | Jacksonville Naval Air Station* | Bunker Hill; St. Augustine, FL | W 47–0 | | |
| November 28 | 3:00 p.m. | vs. Bethune–Cookman | Jacksonville, FL | T 7–7 | | |
| December 25 | | vs. Morris* | Jacksonville, FL (Tropical Bowl) | W 33–6 | | |
| January 1, 1947 | | vs. Delaware State* | Jacksonville, FL (Flower Bowl) | L 6–7 | 2,500 | |
*Non-conference game; ^{†}Homecoming; All times are in Eastern time
