= 1960 Albany State Golden Rams football team =

American college football season

1960 Albany State Golden Rams football

SEAC co-champion
- Conference: Southeastern Athletic Conference
- Record: 7–0–2 (3–0–1 SEAC)
- Head coach: Obie O'Neal (10th season)

1960 Southeastern Athletic Conference football standings
	Conf.					Overall
Team	W		L		T	W		L		T
Albany State +	3	–	0	–	1	7	–	0	–	2
Claflin +	3	–	0	–	1	4	–	4	–	1
Savannah State	2	–	2	–	0	3	–	5	–	1
Morris	1	–	3	–	0	2	–	6	–	1
Paine	0	–	4	–	0	1	–	7	–	0
+ – Conference co-champions

The 1960 Albany State Golden Rams football team represented Albany State University as a member of the Southeastern Athletic Conference (SEAC) during the 1960 college football season. Led by head coach Obie O'Neal, in his tenth season as head coach, the Golden Rams compiled an overall record of 7–0–2 with a mark of 3–0–1, sharing the SEAC title with Claflin. They allowed 1,142 total yards for an average of 126.9 yards per game. Both marks ranke sixth among small colleges. Albany State allowed an average of 71.8 rushing yards per game, placing tenth among small colleges.

== Schedule ==
Date	Opponent	Site	Result	Attendance	Source
September 24	Miles*	Albany, GA	W 3–0		
October 1	at Bethune–Cookman*	Memorial Stadium; Daytona Beach, FL	W 13–0	2,000	
October 8	Edward Waters*	Albany, GA	W 12–0		
October 15	Paine	Albany, GA	W 45–0		
October 22	at Claflin	Orangeburg, SC	T 0–0		
October 29	Savannah State	Albany, GA	W 19–0		
November 5	at Livingstone*	Salisbury, NC	T 0–0		
November 12	Morris	Albany, GA	W 47–0		
November 19	at Fort Valley State*	Fort Valley, GA	W 12–0		
*Non-conference game

== Roster ==
Ed Nelson (FB), Ransom Hill (HB), Willie Townsend (HB), Garfield Stephens (E), Clifton Bradley (T), Charlie Fambro (T), co-captain Milton Bostic (QB-E), co-captain Robert Bowens (C), Art Gamble (QB), Tem DuHart (G), Abner Mackey (T), Earl Summerline (G), Dave Horne (E), Jesse James (HB), Cutris Taylor (QB), Frank Scott (HB), Clayton Furlow (HB), Oscar Webster (HB), Henry Wilson (HB), Eddie Coleman (G), Howard Magwood (G), Stanley Jones (G), Charles Price (G), Brister Hightower (G), Jesse Ivory (HB), Calvin Hention (T), Charles Peters (G), Armond Farrar (E), Jerry Hancock (HB), Bill Parkman (HB), Robert Wiley (T), Charles Goins (E), Leamon Wiley (C), Sherman Bailey (C), Steve Jackson (T), Marion Dious (T)
