= Lane Dragons football =

- First season: 1882; 144 years ago
- Athletic director: Jeremy C Patterson
- Head coach: Stanley Conner; 1st season, 0–10 (.000)
- Location: Jackson, Tennessee
- Stadium: Rothrock Stadium/Lane Field
- NCAA division: Division II
- Conference: Southern Intercollegiate Athletic Conference
- Colors: Royal blue and cardinal
- Bowl record: 0–1 (.000)
- Rivalries: Miles College Golden Bears, Kentucky State University, Tuskegee Golden Tigers, Benedict College Tigers, Harding Bisons

The Lane Dragons football are the college football team representing Lane College. The Dragons compete in NCAA Division II as a member of the Southern Intercollegiate Athletic Conference. They play their home games at Rothrock Stadium in Jackson, Tennessee.

Former Lane defensive tackle Ernest Bonwell was drafted in 1971 in the 11th round by the Dallas Cowboys.

Former Lane defensive back/wide receiver Daryl Hart was drafted by the Buffalo Bills in the second round of the 1984 NFL Supplemental Draft. He became a two-year player in 1984–85 for the Oakland Invaders of the United States Football League (USFL). He also played Arena League professional football with the Chicago Bruisers and the Orlando Predators, culminating his career in 1991. For his Arena League career he caught 32 passes for 408 and 8 touchdowns on offense, and had 109 tackles and 7 interceptions on defense.

Former Lane wide receiver/kick returner Jacoby Jones became the first NFL player in history to score a receiving touchdown and a return touchdown in a Super Bowl, as a member of the Baltimore Ravens. He played a total of nine years in the NFL for the Houston Texans, Baltimore Ravens, San Diego Chargers and the Pittsburgh Steelers. Jones ended his NFL career with 203 receptions for 2,733 yards and 14 touchdowns.

Former Lane running back Fred Lane played three years (1997–99) for the Carolina Panthers. He rushed for 2,001 yards and 14 touchdowns for the Panthers.

Former Lane running back Jason Brookins rushed for 551 yards and 5 touchdowns in 2001 for the Baltimore Ravens.

Former Lane defensive tackle Ron Smith played one season in 2002 for the Cincinnati Bengals.

Former Lane wide receiver Edward Williams played briefly with the Tennessee Titans, Baltimore Ravens and Cleveland Browns from 2008 to 2009.

== History ==
Founded in 1882 by the Colored Methodist Episcopal (C.M.E.) Church in America as the "C.M.E. High School", Lane College was named after Methodist Bishop Isaac Lane, a co-founder of the school. Lane College's primary purpose was to educate newly freed slaves.

Lane's campus is about 25 acres, just northeast of downtown Jackson, Tennessee. Along with Lane, Jackson is also home to Union University and Lambuth University.

Lane's football stadium is Rothrock Stadium, also referred to as "Lane Field." It was built in the 1930s and served as the home stadium of Union University until Union discontinued football in the 1950s. Rothrock/"Lane Field" seats 3,500 people, and The Jackson Sun newspaper has called for Lane College and the city of Jackson to step up and build a new stadium.

"...a century-old stadium is still a century-old stadium, and Lane is competing with the rest of the SIAC teams along with other smaller schools for the same recruits. Just like in big-time college sports, 17-year-old athletes are often swayed to attend college at the place that has the nicer facilities. Lane in most cases will lose that battle. But Jackson can help the Dragons win some of those battles. And hopefully, Lane would be willing to help get a stadium built."

A United States warship, the SS Lane Victory, was named after Lane College. The ship is now a museum ship in San Pedro, California.

=== 1947 team ===
The 1947 Lane Dragons football team ended the season as the 18th-ranked black college football team, according to the Pittsburgh Courier and the Dickinson Rating System. For the year, the 1947 team outscored its opponents 194 to 87.

Under 11th-year head coach Edward Clemons, the Dragons carved out a 6–4 regular season, with a 26–0 victory over Alabama A&M and a one-point loss to South Carolina State on October 11 in Orangeburg, South Carolina. Led by Wild Bill Battles at quarterback, team captain Alex Moore at tackle, Country Reeves at center, and William Green at fullback, the Dragons were invited to play against Bethune–Cookman in the 1947 Flower Bowl in Jacksonville, Florida. Bethune–Cookman was coached by the legendary Bunky Matthews.

The high-powered Dragon offense outgained the Bethune–Cookman Wildcats 157 yards to 77, but Lane lost the game. Trailing 6–0, Lane drove 81 yards downfield, only to turn the ball over on downs at the Bethune–Cookman 9-yard line.

=== 1982 team ===
Led by head coach, Neal McCall, the 1982 football team earned the school's only Southern Intercollegiate Athletic Conference championship (Division III). The Dragons finished the season with a 6–2–1 record including wins over Miles College, Fisk University, Baptist University, and others. Earned a tie with the University of Arkansas at Pine Bluff.
