= Bunky Matthews =

American football and basketball coach (1915–1976)

Biographical details
- Born: August 14, 1915
- Died: September 28, 1976 (aged 61); Daytona Beach, Florida, U.S.
- Education: Columbia

Playing career

Football
- c. 1935: Bethune–Cookman
- c. 1937: Morehouse

Coaching career (HC unless noted)

Football
- 1944–1945: Edward Waters
- 1946–1960: Bethune–Cookman

Basketball
- 1947–1956: Bethune–Cookman

Head coaching record
- Overall: 87–54–6 (football); 90–47 (basketball)
- Bowls: 3–3

Accomplishments and honors

Championships
- Football; 2 SEAC (1947); 1 SIAC (1952)

Rudolph G. "Bunky" Matthews (August 14, 1915 – September 28, 1976) was an American college football and college basketball coach. He served as the head football coach at Bethune–Cookman University in Daytona Beach, Florida from 1946 to 1960, compiling a record of 83–46–6. He is widely credited as being the first football coach in the modern, competitive era of Bethune–Cookman football history. Matthews was also the head basketball coach at Bethune–Cookman from 1947 to 1956, tallying a mark of 90–47.

Matthews died of a heart attack, on September 28, 1976.

== Head coaching record ==
=== Football ===
Year	Team	Overall	Conference	Standing	Bowl/playoffs
Edward Waters Tigers () (1944–1945)
1944	Edward Waters	2–4			
1945	Edward Waters	2–4			
Edward Waters:		4–8			
Bethune–Cookman Wildcats (Southeastern Athletic Conference) (1946–1950)
1946	Bethune–Cookman	7–1–1	3–1–1	T–2nd	
1947	Bethune–Cookman	10–2	6–0	1st	L Lions, W Flower
1948	Bethune–Cookman	7–2–1			
1949	Bethune–Cookman	5–3			
1950	Bethune–Cookman	4–3–1	2–0	NA	L Iodine Bowl
Bethune–Cookman Wildcats (Southern Intercollegiate Athletic Conference) (1951–1960)
1951	Bethune–Cookman	7–2	4–2	T–5th	W Steel
1952	Bethune–Cookman	9–1	5–1	1st	W Tropical
1953	Bethune–Cookman	6–3–2	3–1–2	T–5th	L Tropical
1954	Bethune–Cookman	5–3	1–3	11th	
1955	Bethune–Cookman	5–4–1	4–2	2nd	
1956	Bethune–Cookman	6–3	4–2	2nd	
1957	Bethune–Cookman	2–6	1–5	13th	
1958	Bethune–Cookman	1–7	1–6	14th	
1959	Bethune–Cookman	6–2	4–2	T–6th	
1960	Bethune–Cookman	3–4	2–3	8th	
Bethune–Cookman:		83–46–6			
Total:		87–54–6			
National championship Conference title Conference division title or championship game berth
