= Samuel Adler =

Samuel Adler may refer to:

- Samuel Adler (rabbi) (1809–1891), Reform rabbi
- Samuel Adler (composer) (born 1928), composer and conductor
- Samuel Adler (artist) (1898–1979), American artist
