= List of Texas Southern Tigers head football coaches =

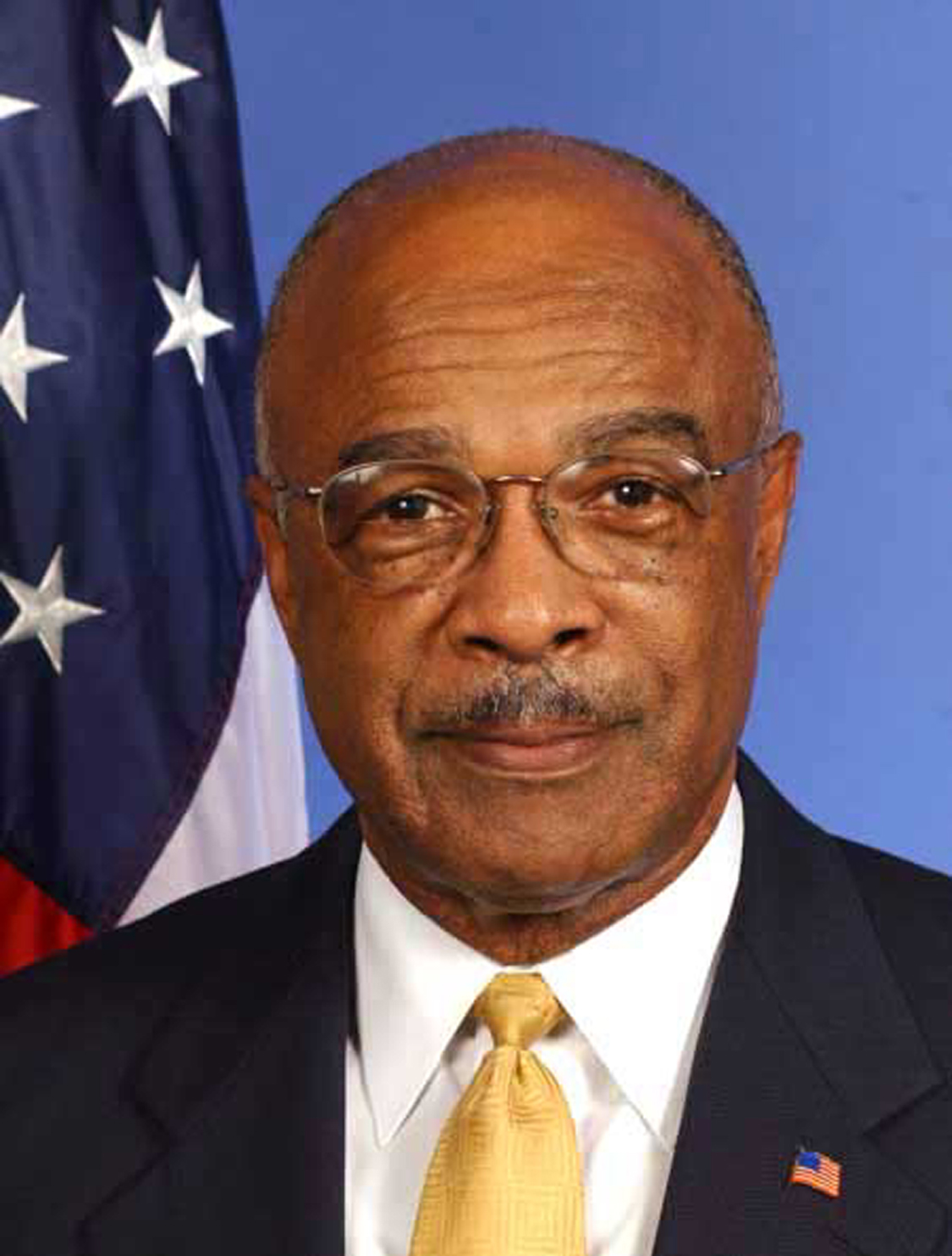
Rod Paige served as the fifth head coach of the Texas Southern Tigers from 1971 to 1975.

The Texas Southern Tigers college football team represents Texas Southern University (Note: Texas Southern University previously competed as the Texas State University for Negroes from 1947 to 1950.) as a member of the Southwestern Athletic Conference (SWAC). The Tigers competes as part of the NCAA Division I Football Championship Subdivision. The program has had 16 head coaches and one interim head coach, since it began play during the 1947 season. Since January 2024, Cris Dishman has served as head coach at Texas Southern.

Since their 1947 season, two coaches have led Texas Southern in postseason bowl games: Eolus Von Rettig and Alexander Durley. Three coaches have won conference championships: Durley won one as a member of the Midwest Athletic Association, and Durley and Johnnie Cole each won one, and Clifford Paul won two as a member of the SWAC. (Note: In October 2012, the NCAA officially vacated all wins from the 2010 season as part of their penalties for playing ineligible players during the season. This resulted in the vacating of all nine victories and their SWAC championship under head coach Johnnir Cole.)

Durley is the leader in seasons coached, games played, and won, with 164 games and 101 wins, during his 16 years with the program. Alfred Benefield has the highest winning percentage of those who have coached more than one game, with .667. Steve Wilson has the lowest winning percentage of those who have coached more than one game, with .091.

== Key ==
Key to symbols in coaches list
General		Overall		Conference		Postseason (Note: Although the first Rose Bowl Game was played in 1902, it has been continuously played since the 1916 game, and is recognized as the oldest bowl game by the NCAA. "—" indicates any season prior to 1916 when postseason games were not played.)	
No.	Order of coaches (Note: A running total of the number of head coaches, with coaches who served separate tenures being counted only once. Interim head coaches are represented with "Int" and are not counted in the running total. "—" indicates the team played but either without a coach or no coach is on record. "X" indicates an interim year without play.)	GC	Games coached	CW	Conference wins	PW	Postseason wins
DC	Division championships	OW	Overall wins	CL	Conference losses	PL	Postseason losses
CC	Conference championships	OL	Overall losses	CT	Conference ties	PT	Postseason ties
NC	National championships	OT	Overall ties (Note: Overtime rules in college football were introduced in 1996, making ties impossible in the period since.)	C%	Conference winning percentage		
†	Elected to the College Football Hall of Fame	O%	Overall winning percentage (Note: When computing the win–loss percentage, a tie counts as half a win and half a loss.)				

== Coaches ==
List of head football coaches showing season(s) coached, overall records, conference records, postseason records, championships and selected awards (Note: Statistics correct as of the end of the 2024 NCAA Division I FCS football season.)
No.	Name	Season(s)	GC	OW	OL	OT	O%	CW	CL	CT	C%	PW	PL	PT	CC	NC	Awards
1	Eolus Von Rettig	1947–1948	21	9	11	1	0.452	—	—	—	—	1	0	0	—	0	—
2	Alexander Durley	1949–1964	164	101	55	8	0.640	38	26	3	0.590	1	3	1	2	0	—
3	Clifford Paul	1965–1969	49	27	18	4	0.592	22	10	3	0.671	0	0	0	1	0	—
4	Alfred Benefield	1970	9	6	3	0	0.667	4	2	0	0.667	0	0	0	0	0	—
5	Rod Paige	1971–1975	51	27	21	3	0.559	13	14	3	0.483	0	0	0	0	0	—
6	Wendell Mosley	1976–1978	33	11	20	2	0.364	5	11	2	0.333	0	0	0	0	0	—
7	Jim Sorey	1979–1980	22	5	17	0	0.227	3	9	0	0.250	0	0	0	0	0	—
8	Joe Redmond	1981–1983	32	9	21	2	0.313	4	16	0	0.200	0	0	0	0	0	—
9	Lionel Taylor	1984–1988	55	13	41	1	0.245	7	27	1	0.214	0	0	0	0	0	—
10	Wally Highsmith	1989–1993	55	19	34	2	0.364	12	20	2	0.382	0	0	0	0	0	—
11	William A. Thomas	1994–2003	108	50	58	0	0.463	32	37	0	0.464	0	0	0	0	0	—
12	Steve Wilson	2004–2007	44	4	40	—	0.091	4	30	—	0.118	0	0	—	0	0	—
13	Johnnie Cole	2008–2010	35	19	16	—	0.543	14	9	—	0.609	0	0	—	1	0	—
Int. (Note: Ramsey served as interim head coach for the 2011 season after Johnnie Cole was fired in April 2011.)	Kevin Ramsey	2011	11	4	7	—	0.364	2	7	—	0.222	0	0	—	0	0	—
14	Darrell Asberry	2012–2015	43	12	31	—	0.279	9	27	—	0.250	0	0	—	0	0	—
15	Michael Haywood	2016–2018	33	8	25	—	0.242	7	17	—	0.292	0	0	—	0	0	—
16	Clarence McKinney	2019–2023	47	12	35	—	0.255	9	26	—	0.257	0	0	—	0	0	—
17	Cris Dishman	2024–present	11	5	6	—	0.455	4	4	—	0.500	0	0	—	0	0	—
