= Arthur Rose Sr. =

American painter

- Born: May 26, 1921; Charleston, South Carolina, United States
- Died: February 13, 1995 (aged 73); Columbia, South Carolina, United States
- Education: Claflin University (B.Art), NYU, (Master's Degree)
- Known for: Art, Art Education, painting, sculpture
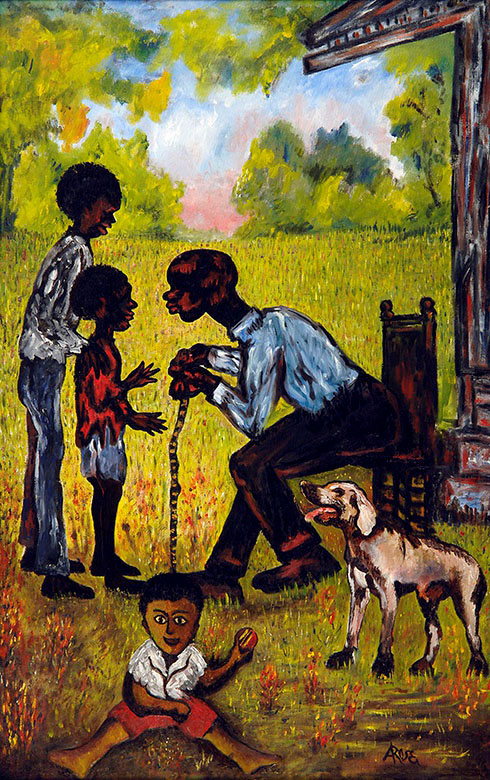
- Notable work: The Graduate (1974 Sculpture); Facts of Life Oil on Canvas 39 1/8" x 25 1/8"
- Movement: Expressionist
- Spouse(s): Elizabeth McMillan Rose, 1926 -

Arthur Rose Sr. (May 26, 1921 - February 13, 1995) was an American painter, sculptor, and professor. He has been featured in many publications and public exhibitions in the United States.

== Biography ==
Rose was African-American. Arthur Rose Sr. was born in Charleston, South Carolina on May 26, 1921.

=== World War II Service ===
In November 1942, he enlisted in the Navy, serving until December 6, 1945, when he was honorably discharged.

=== Education ===
Rose graduated cum laude from Claflin University in 1950, becoming the second student in the school's history to earn a degree in art. Wanting to further his education, Rose attended New York University and studied under several noted artists, including Hale Woodruff, earning his master's degree in 1952.

=== Teaching years ===
In 1952 Rose returned to Claflin, helping to establish that school's Department of Art, and served as its Chair through 1976. In 1977, he transferred to Voorhees College, becoming that school's Artist in Residence, continuing to teach through 1991. Many students under his tutelage were poor. Not only would Rose invite them to his home for meals, but would provide them art supplies. Many of his students would go on to successful art and teaching careers of their own. One of them, Leo Twiggs, would help establish the art program and museum at South Carolina State College.

An art museum has been established in his name at Claflin.

He had four children: Patricia A. Rose (deceased), Arthur Rose Jr., Bernard H. Rose, and Marcia L. Rose (deceased).
