= 1947 Bethune–Cookman Wildcats football team =

American college football season

1947 Bethune–Cookman Wildcats football

SEAC champion

Lions Bowl, L 6–47 vs. Grambling Flower Bowl, W 6–0 vs. Lane
- Conference: Southeastern Athletic Conference
- Record: 10–2 (6–0 SEAC)
- Head coach: Bunky Matthews (2nd season)

1947 Southeastern Athletic Conference football standings
| | Conf. | | | | | Overall |
| Team | W | | L | | T | W | | L | | T |
|---|---|---|---|---|---|---|---|---|---|---|
| Bethune–Cookman $ | 6 | – | 0 | – | 0 | 10 | – | 2 | – | 0 |
| Allen | 3 | – | 0 | – | 0 | 6 | – | 4 | – | 0 |
| Florida Normal | 4 | – | 1 | – | 0 | 7 | – | 3 | – | 0 |
| Paine | 3 | – | 3 | – | 0 | 3 | – | 4 | – | 0 |
| Claflin | 2 | – | 5 | – | 0 | 2 | – | 6 | – | 0 |
| Albany State | 1 | – | 3 | – | 1 | 1 | – | 5 | – | 1 |
| Georgia State | 1 | – | 5 | – | 1 | 1 | – | 5 | – | 1 |
| Morris | 1 | – | 4 | – | 0 | ? | – | ? | – | ? |
$ – Conference champion

The 1947 Bethune–Cookman Wildcats football team was an American football team that represented Bethune Cookman College as a member of the Southeastern Athletic Conference (SEAC) during the 1947 college football season. In their second season under head coach Bunky Matthews, the Wildcats compiled am overall record of 10–2, with a mark of 6–0 in conefrence playing, winning the SEAC title. Bethune–Cookman was ranked No. 2 among the nation's smaller black college football teams by the Pittsburgh Courier using the Dickinson Rating System. The team played home games in Daytona Beach, Florida.

Key players included quarterback "Sport" Anderson.

Bethune Cookman had a total enrollment of approximately 800 students in the fall of 1947.

== Schedule ==
| Date | Opponent | Site | Result | Attendance | Source |
|---|---|---|---|---|---|
| September 27 | at Florida A&M* | Bragg Stadium; Tallahassee, FL (rivalry) | L 0–6 | | |
| October 4 | Edward Waters* | Daytona Beach, FL | W 33–0 | | |
| October 11 | vs. Albany State | Miami, FL | W 34–0 | | |
| October 18 | vs. Georgia State | Orlando, FL | W 21–0 | | |
| October 25 | Wilberforce*^{†} | Daytona Beach, FL | W 45–6 | | |
| November 1 | Morristown | Daytona Beach, FL | W 51–7 | | |
| November 8 | at Morris | Sumter, SC | W 39–0 | | |
| November 15 | vs. Claflin | Phillips Field; Tampa, FL | W 48–0 | | |
| November 22 | MacDill Field* | Daytona Beach, FL | W 47–0 | | |
| November 27 | vs. Florida Normal | Bryant Stadium; Lakeland, FL | W 2–0 | > 3,000 | |
| December 5 | at Grambling* | Ruston, LA (Lions Bowl) | L 6–47 | 8,000 | |
| January 1, 1948 | vs. Lane* | Jacksonville Ball Park; Jacksonville, FL (Flower Bowl) | W 6–0 | 3,000 | |
*Non-conference game; ^{†}Homecoming
