= 1946 Allen Yellow Jackets football team =

American college football season

1946 Allen Yellow Jackets football

SEAC champion

Piedmont Tobacco Bowl, W 40–6 vs. Fayetteville State
- Conference: Southeastern Athletic Conference
- Record: 8–2 (5–0 SEAC)
- Head coach: William W. Lawson (4th season)

1946 Southeastern Athletic Conference football standings
	Conf.					Overall
Team	W		L		T	W		L		T
No. 11 Allen $	5	–	0	–	0	8	–	2	–	0
No. 12 Bethune–Cookman	3	–	1	–	1	7	–	1	–	1
Florida Normal	3	–	1	–	1	6	–	3	–	1
Paine	3	–	2	–	1	?	–	?	–	?
Georgia State	2	–	2	–	1	3	–	2	–	2
Morris	2	–	4	–	0	?	–	?	–	?
Claflin	1	–	4	–	0	1	–	6	–	1
Fort Valley State	0	–	2	–	0	0	–	9	–	0
Albany State	0	–	3	–	0	0	–	7	–	0
$ – Conference champion; Rankings from Pittsburgh Courier Dickinson System

The 1946 Allen Yellow Jackets football team was an American football team that represented Allen University of Columbia, South Carolina, in the Southeastern Athletic Conference (SEAC) during the 1946 college football season. William "Buster" Lawson and Hooks Nelson were the team's coaches. The team compiled an overall record of 8–2 with a mark of 5–0 in conference play, winning the SEAC title. The Yellow Jackets lost the first two games of the season and then won the remain eight games, including a victory over Fayetteville State in the Piedmont Tobacco Bowl.

The Dickinson System rated Allen as the No. 11 black college football team for 1946.

== Schedule ==
Date	Time	Opponent	Site	Result	Attendance	Source
September 28		at Virginia State*	Petersburg, VA	L 6–12		
October 5		Morris Brown*	Columbia, SC	L 9–12		
October 18		at Paine	Augusta, GA	W 19–0		
October 26	2:30 p.m.	at Florida Normal	Bunker Hill; St. Augustine, FL	W 12–6		
October 31		Benedict*	Columbia, SC (Negro State Fair)	W 14–0	10,000	
November 2		Bethune–Cookman	Columbia, SC	W 7–6		
November 9	1:30 p.m.	Georgia State	Hurst-Alumni Stadium; Columbia, SC	W 60–0		
November 17		at Howard*	Washington, DC	W 7–0		
November 28		Claflin	Hurst Field; Columbia, SC	W 70–0		
December 7		at Fayetteville State*	Cumberland Stadium; Fayetteville, NC (Piedmont Tobacco Bowl)	W 40–6		
*Non-conference game; All times are in Eastern time
