= William W. Lawson =

American sports coach, athletics administrator (c. 1914 – 1986)

Biographical details
- Born: c. 1914
- Died: February 24, 1986 (aged 71); Petersburg, Virginia, U.S.

Playing career

Football
- c. 1935: Allen

Coaching career (HC unless noted)

Football
- c. 1941: Allen (assistant)
- 1943–1953: Allen
- 1954–1969: Virginia State

Administrative career (AD unless noted)
- ?–1954: Allen

Head coaching record
- Overall: 103–91–11 (football)
- Bowls: 6–3

Accomplishments and honors

Championships
- Football; 1 SEAC (1946)

William W. "Buster" Lawson Sr. (c. 1914 – February 24, 1986) was an American football, basketball, baseball, track and field coach, college athletics administrator, and educator. He served as the head football coach at Allen University in Columbia, South Carolina from 1943 to 1953, and Virginia State College—now known as Virginia State University—in Petersburg, Virginia from 1954 to 1969.

A native of Camden, South Carolina, Lawson received a bachelor's from Allen University and a master's degree in physical education from Columbia University. He played football at Allen, and then served as an assistant football coach at his alma mater under Thomas B. Nelson in the early 1940s. Lawson also coached baseball, basketball, and track and field at Allen, and served as the school's athletic director. At Virginia State, Lawson also taught physical education before retiring in 1972. He died on February 24, 1986, at a hospital in Petersburg.

== Head coaching record ==
=== Football ===
Year	Team	Overall	Conference	Standing	Bowl/playoffs
Allen Yellow Jackets (Southeastern Athletic Conference) (1943–1947)
1943	Allen	4–2–1			W Flower Bowl
1944	Allen	3–5			
1945	Allen	8–1–1	4–0		L Cotton-Tobacco Bowl
1946	Allen	8—2	5–0	1st	W Piedmont Tobacco Bowl
1947	Allen	6–4	3–0	2nd	L Pecan Bowl
Allen Yellow Jackets (Southern Intercollegiate Athletic Conference) (1948–1953)
1948	Allen	7–1	3–0	3rd	
1949	Allen	5–6	0–3		L Iodine Bowl
1950	Allen	5–4–1	2–2–1		W Peninsula Bowl, W Iodine Bowl
1951	Allen	3–7	1–5		W Iodine Bowl
1952	Allen	6–4	4–1		
1953	Allen	3–5–2	0–3–1	13th	W Iodine Bowl
Allen:		35–31–3			
Virginia State Trojans (Central Intercollegiate Athletic Association) (1954–1969)
1954	Virginia State	7–2	7–1	3rd	
1955	Virginia State	4–2–3	4–1–3	6th	
1956	Virginia State	1–7–1	1–6–1	14th	
1957	Virginia State	4–4	4–4	T–8th	
1958	Virginia State	3–6	3–6	12th	
1959	Virginia State	7–2	7–2	3rd	
1960	Virginia State	6–3	5–3	6th	
1961	Virginia State	3–4–1	3–4–1	9th	
1962	Virginia State	3–5	3–5	10th	
1963	Virginia State	4–4	4–4	7th	
1964	Virginia State	6–2	6–2	6th	
1965	Virginia State	5–4	5–4	7th	
1966	Virginia State	3–5	3–5	13th	
1967	Virginia State	4–3–1	4–3–1	7th	
1968	Virginia State	5–2–1	5–2–1	6th	
1969	Virginia State	3–5–1	3–5–1	11th	
Virginia State:		68–60–8	67–57–8		
Total:		103–91–11			
National championship Conference title Conference division title or championship game berth
