= Flower Bowl =

Flower Bowl may refer to:

- Flower Bowl (bowl game), a college football bowl game played in the 1940s in Jacksonville, Florida
- Flower Bowl (horse), an American Thoroughbred racehorse
- Flower Bowl Stakes, an American Grade I horse race run in early September at Saratoga Race Course
