= 1946 Bethune–Cookman Wildcats football team =

American college football season

1946 Bethune–Cookman Wildcats football

Coconut Bowl, W 13-0 vs. Columbia Athletic Club
- Conference: Southeastern Athletic Conference
- Record: 7–1–1 (3–1–1 SEAC)
- Head coach: Bunky Matthews (1st season)
- Home stadium: Volusia Field

1946 Southeastern Athletic Conference football standings
	Conf.					Overall
Team	W		L		T	W		L		T
No. 11 Allen $	5	–	0	–	0	8	–	2	–	0
No. 12 Bethune–Cookman	3	–	1	–	1	7	–	1	–	1
Florida Normal	3	–	1	–	1	6	–	3	–	1
Paine	3	–	2	–	1	?	–	?	–	?
Georgia State	2	–	2	–	1	3	–	2	–	2
Morris	2	–	4	–	0	?	–	?	–	?
Claflin	1	–	4	–	0	1	–	6	–	1
Fort Valley State	0	–	2	–	0	0	–	9	–	0
Albany State	0	–	3	–	0	0	–	7	–	0
$ – Conference champion; Rankings from Pittsburgh Courier Dickinson System

The 1946 Bethune–Cookman Wildcats football team was an American football team that represented Bethune Cookman College as a member of the Southeastern Athletic Conference (SEAC) during the 1946 college football season. In their first season under head coach Bunky Matthews, the team compiled an overall record of 7–1–1 with a mark of 3–1–1 in conference play, trying for second place in the SEAC. Bethune–Cookman played home games at Volusia Field in Daytona Beach, Florida.

The Dickinson System rated Bethune-Cookman in a tie for No. 12 among the black college football teams for 1946.

== Schedule ==
Date	Time	Opponent	Site	Result	Attendance	Source
October 5		at Voorhees*	Denmark, SC	W 18–0		
October 12	2:30 p.m.	Albany State	Volusia Field; Daytona Beach, FL	W 68–6		
October 19		Morris	Volusia Field; Daytona Beach, FL	W 41–7		
October 26	2:30 p.m.	Benedict*^{†}	Volusia Field; Daytona Beach, FL	W 18–0		
November 2		at Allen	Columbia, SC	L 6–7		
November 9		vs. Leland*	Phillips Field; Tampa, FL	W 25–6	2,500–5,000	
November 16		at Paine	Augusta, GA	W 13–6	4,000	
November 28	3:00 p.m.	vs. Florida Normal	Jacksonville, FL	T 7–7		
January 1, 1947		vs. Columbia Athletic Club*	Dorsey Park; Miami, FL (Coconut Bowl)	W 13–0	5,000	
*Non-conference game; ^{†}Homecoming; All times are in Eastern time
