= Oliver C. Dawson Stadium =

Multi-purpose stadium

Coordinates: 33.498592°N 80.844636°W

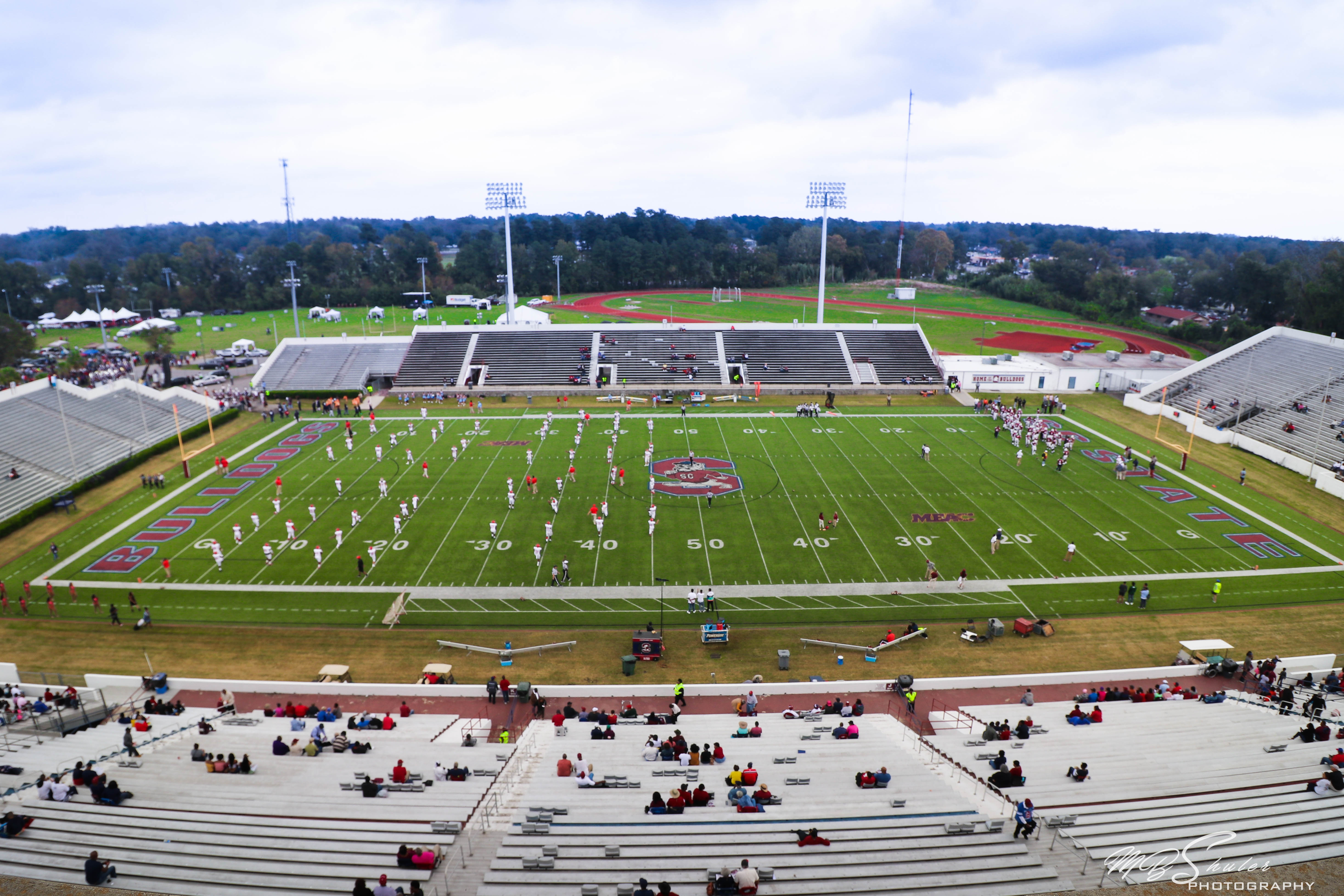
- Interactive map of Oliver C. Dawson Stadium
- Former names: State College Stadium (1955–1984)
- Location: 300 College Street; Orangeburg, SC 29117
- Owner: South Carolina State University
- Operator: South Carolina State University
- Capacity: 22,000
- Surface: Poly Turf

Construction
- Opened: 1955
- Cost: $175,000

Tenant
- South Carolina State Bulldogs

Oliver C. Dawson Stadium is a 22,000-seat multi-purpose stadium in Orangeburg, South Carolina. It opened in 1955, with major renovations in 1994. It is home to the South Carolina State Bulldogs college football team and the women's college soccer team.

The Bulldogs played the first football game at the stadium – then known as State College Stadium – on October 1, 1955, against Allen University. The stadium took its current name in 1984, named after Oliver C. Dawson (1910–1989), athletic director at the university for 16 years, and inductee of the South Carolina Athletic Hall of Fame.

From 2006 to 2009, the stadium served as the host of the South Carolina High School League's Class 1A state football championship games.

== See also ==
- List of NCAA Division I FCS football stadiums
