= Earl Middleton =

American politician and businessman

Earl Matthew Middleton (February 18, 1919 – November 2007) was a businessman who served as a state legislator in South Carolina. An African American, he served in the military during World War II. He represented Orangeburg County in the South Carolina House of Representatives from 1974 to 1984.

== Early life and education ==
Middleton was born February 18, 1919, in Orangeburg, South Carolina, the youngest of six children. His great-great-grandfather was an enslaved. His father was a carpenter and his mother was in the first graduating class of the University of South Carolina.

In 1942, Middleton graduated from Claflin University. Later that year he joined the military first training as a pilot in Tuskegee, Alabama, then joining the Army in a segregated unit, serving as barber for black servicemen.

== Career ==
After returning from the Army in 1946, he opened a barber shop while selling insurance and homes on the side. In the 1950s, he started his own insurance and real-estate business.

He was active in the NAACP.

He wrote an autobiography.

In 2007, Middletom was awarded a Congressional Gold Medal, presented to him by President George W. Bush.

== Personal life ==
Middleton married Bernice Bryant in 1947 and had two daughters and one son.
