= Obie O'Neal =

American football coach (1925–1994)

Biographical details
- Born: June 17, 1925; Union County, North Carolina, U.S.
- Died: January 31, 1994 (aged 68); Dougherty, Georgia, U.S.
- Education: Bluefield State College; West Virginia University

Playing career

Football
- ?: Bluefield State

Coaching career (HC unless noted)

Football
- 1951–1967: Albany State

Men's basketball
- 1951–1958: Albany State

Women's basketball
- 1991: Albany State (interim HC)

Track and field
- 1951–?: Albany State

Administrative career (AD unless noted)
- 1951–?: Albany State

Head coaching record
- Overall: 79–57–10 (football)
- Bowls: 0–1

Accomplishments and honors

Championships
- 6 SEAC (1955, 1957, 1959–1960, 1962, 1966)

Obie Washington O'Neal Jr. (June 17, 1925 – January 31, 1994) was an American college football coach. He was the head football coach for Albany State College—now known as Albany State University—from 1951 to 1967. He also served stints as the head coach for the school's men's and women's basketball team and the track and field team.

O'Neal was the athletic director for Albany State throughout his tenure. He also served the chairman of the college's department of health and physical education.

== Head coaching record ==
=== Football ===
Year	Team	Overall	Conference	Standing	Bowl/playoffs	ANP^{#}
Albany State Golden Rams (Southeastern Athletic Conference) (1951–1966)
1951	Albany State	5–3				
1952	Albany State	7–3	4–1	2nd	L Tropical Bowl	
1953	Albany State	2–5–1	2–2–1	4th		
1954	Albany State	3–4–1				
1955	Albany State	7–1	5–0	1st		
1956	Albany State	3–3–2	2–2–1	4th		
1957	Albany State	4–3–1	3–1–1	1st		
1958	Albany State	4–4				
1959	Albany State	4–5	3–1	1st		
1960	Albany State	7–0–2	3–0–1	T–1st		12
1961	Albany State	6–3	3–2	T–2nd		
1962	Albany State	6–3	4–1	1st		
1963	Albany State	4–4	2–2	T–3rd		
1964	Albany State	5–3				
1965	Albany State	5–3–2				
1966	Albany State	4–4–1		1st		
Albany State Golden Rams (NCAA College Division independent) (1967)
1967	Albany State	3–6				
Albany State:		79–57–10				
Total:		79–57–10				
National championship Conference title Conference division title or championship game berth
^{#}Rankings from final Associated Negro Press poll.
