= 1947 Wiley Wildcats football team =

American college football season

1947 Wiley Wildcats football
- Conference: Southwestern Athletic Conference
- Record: 5–3–1 (3–3–1 SWAC)
- Head coach: Fred T. Long (25th season)
- Home stadium: Wiley Field

1947 Southwestern Athletic Conference football standings
	Conf.					Overall
Team	W		L		T	W		L		T
No. 8 Southern $	7	–	0	–	0	10	–	2	–	0
No. 17 Prairie View A&M	5	–	2	–	0	6	–	6	–	0
No. 16 Texas College	3	–	1	–	1	5	–	2	–	3
Bishop	3	–	2	–	2	3	–	4	–	3
No. 20 Wiley	3	–	3	–	1	4	–	3	–	2
Langston	2	–	4	–	1	2	–	7	–	1
Samuel Huston	1	–	6	–	0	3	–	9	–	0
Arkansas AM&N	0	–	6	–	1	2	–	7	–	1
$ – Conference champion; Rankings from the Pittsburgh Courier using the Dickinson Ratings System.

The 1947 Wiley Wildcats football team was an American football team that represented Wiley College in the Southwestern Athletic Conference (SWAC) during the 1947 college football season. In their 25th season under head coach Fred T. Long, the team compiled a 5–3–1 record (3–3–1 against conference opponents), finished in fifth place in the SWAC, and outscored opponents by a total of 126 to 58. Southern ranked No. 8 among the nation's black college football teams according to the Pittsburgh Courier and its Dickinson Rating System.

On October 25, 1947, the team played its first night game at Wiley Field against the Lane Dragons.

== Schedule ==
Date	Opponent	Site	Result	Attendance	Source
September 27	at Clark (GA)*	Ponce de Leon Park; Atlanta, GA	W 40–7		
October 4	at Arkansas AM&N	Pine Bluff, AR	W 26–0		
October 13	vs. Prairie View A&M	Cotton Bowl; Dallas, TX (State Fair Classic)	L 6–12		
October 25	Lane*	Wiley Field; Marshall, TX	W 22–7		
November 8	Langston	Wiley Field; Marshall, TX	W 20–2		
November 15	at Southern	University Stadium; Baton Rouge, LA	L 0–23		
November 22	vs. Samuel Huston	Alamo Stadium; San Antonio, TX	W 6–0		
November 27	Texas College^{†}	Wiley Field; Marshall, TX	L 6–7	> 6,000	
December 6	Bishop	Wiley Field; Marshall, TX	T 0–0		
*Non-conference game; ^{†}Homecoming
