= 1947 Tuskegee Golden Tigers football team =

American college football season

1947 Tuskegee Golden Tigers football
- Conference: Southern Intercollegiate Athletic Conference
- Record: 6–4–1 (3–2–1 SIAC)
- Head coach: Cleve Abbott (25th season)
- Home stadium: Alumni Bowl

1947 Southern Intercollegiate Athletic Conference football standings
	Conf.					Overall
Team	W		L		T	W		L		T
No. 3 Florida A&M $	5	–	0	–	0	9	–	1	–	0
No. 10 South Carolina State	5	–	0	–	2	7	–	1	–	2
No. 15 Fort Valley State	4	–	0	–	1	7	–	1	–	1
No. 3 (small) LeMoyne	2	–	1	–	0	4	–	1	–	1
Tuskegee	3	–	2	–	1	6	–	4	–	1
No. 21 Clark (GA)	3	–	2	–	1	4	–	3	–	1
No. 18 Lane	2	–	2	–	0	6	–	5	–	0
Morehouse	3	–	4	–	0	3	–	5	–	0
Morris Brown	2	–	4	–	1	3	–	7	–	1
Knoxville	1	–	2	–	1	-	–	-	–	-
Alabama State	2	–	5	–	2	2	–	6	–	2
Fisk	1	–	3	–	1	-	–	-	–	-
No. 7 (small) Alabama A&M	1	–	4	–	1	3	–	5	–	1
Xavier (LA)	0	–	2	–	1	1	–	5	–	1
Benedict	0	–	3	–	2	2	–	4	–	3
$ – Conference champion; Rankings from the Pittsburgh Courier using the Dickinson Ratings System.

The 1947 Tuskegee Golden Tigers football team represented the Tuskegee Institute—now known as Tuskegee University—as a member of the Southern Intercollegiate Athletic Conference (SIAC) during the 1947 college football season. In their 25th season under head coach Cleve Abbott, Tuskegee compiled a 6–4–1 record (3–2–1 against conference opponents) and outscored all opponents by a total of 174 to 116. The team played home games at the Alumni Bowl in Tuskegee, Alabama.

== Schedule ==
Date	Opponent	Site	Result	Attendance	Source
September 13	25th Infantry (Buffalo Soldiers)*	Alumni Bowl; Tuskegee, AL	W 22–0		
September 20	Philander Smith*	Alumni Bowl; Tuskegee, AL	W 27–0		
September 27	Grambling*	Alumni Bowl; Tuskegee, AL	W 19–6		
October 9	vs. Clark (GA)	Rickwood Field; Birmingham, AL	W 13–0		
October 10	vs. Wilberforce State*	Comiskey Park; Chicago, IL	L 6–20	25,000	
October 18	at Hampton*	Armstrong Field; Hampton, VA	L 0–19		
October 24	vs. Morehouse	Memorial Stadium; Columbus, GA	W 31–7	16,000	
November 1	Xavier (LA)	Alumni Bowl; Tuskegee, AL	W 24–7		
November 8	Florida A&M^{†}	Alumni Bowl; Tuskegee, AL	L 6–19		
November 15	at South Carolina State	State College Stadium; Orangeburg, SC	L 0–12	8,000	
November 27	at Alabama State	Cramton Bowl; Montgomery, AL (Turkey Day Classic)	T 26–26	15,000	
*Non-conference game; ^{†}Homecoming
