= 1947 Fort Valley State Wildcats football team =

American college football season

1947 Fort Valley State Wildcats football

Yam Bowl, L 0–46 vs. Southern
- Conference: Southern Intercollegiate Athletic Conference
- Record: 7–1–1 (4–0–1 SIAC)
- Head coach: Richard Craig

1947 Southern Intercollegiate Athletic Conference football standings
	Conf.					Overall
Team	W		L		T	W		L		T
No. 3 Florida A&M $	5	–	0	–	0	9	–	1	–	0
No. 10 South Carolina State	5	–	0	–	2	7	–	1	–	2
No. 15 Fort Valley State	4	–	0	–	1	7	–	1	–	1
No. 3 (small) LeMoyne	2	–	1	–	0	4	–	1	–	1
Tuskegee	3	–	2	–	1	6	–	4	–	1
No. 21 Clark (GA)	3	–	2	–	1	4	–	3	–	1
No. 18 Lane	2	–	2	–	0	6	–	5	–	0
Morehouse	3	–	4	–	0	3	–	5	–	0
Morris Brown	2	–	4	–	1	3	–	7	–	1
Knoxville	1	–	2	–	1	-	–	-	–	-
Alabama State	2	–	5	–	2	2	–	6	–	2
Fisk	1	–	3	–	1	-	–	-	–	-
No. 7 (small) Alabama A&M	1	–	4	–	1	3	–	5	–	1
Xavier (LA)	0	–	2	–	1	-	–	-	–	-
Benedict	0	–	3	–	2	2	–	4	–	3
$ – Conference champion; Rankings from the Pittsburgh Courier using the Dickinson Ratings System.

The 1947 Fort Valley State Wildcats football team was an American football team that represented Fort Valley State College in the Southern Intercollegiate Athletic Conference (SIAC) during the 1947 college football season. Led by head coach Richard Craig, the team compiled a 7–0–1 record in eight regular season games. The Wildcats were ranked No. 15 among the nation's black college football teams according to the Pittsburgh Courier and its Dickinson Rating System.

After going through its eight-game regular season with an undefeated record, Fort Valley was regarded as the "Cinderella team" of 1947 and received an invitation to play No. 8 Southern in the Yam Bowl in Dallas. Southern defeated Fort Valley by a 46–0 score on Christmas Day.

Key players included halfback Ted Bey, Webb Hollis, Joseph Davis, and Carl Cannon. William E. McKinney was the assistant coach.

== Schedule ==
Date	Opponent	Site	Result	Attendance	Source
October 11	Knoxville	Wildcats Field; Fort Valley, GA	T 0–0	1,550	
October 18	Edward Waters*		W 21–0		
October 25	at Albany State*	Albany, GA	W 26–6		
November 1	Miles*	Wildcats Field; Fort Valley, GA	W 14–6		
November 8	vs. Morris Brown	Porter Field; Macon, GA	W 19–13		
November 15	Benedict		W 7–0		
November 22	Alabama State	Wildcats Field; Fort Valley, GA	W 25–0		
November 27	Alabama A&M	Wildcats Field; Fort Valley, GA	W 20–6	2,500	
December 25	vs. Southern*	Dal-Hi Stadium; Dallas, TX (Yam Bowl)	L 0–46	1,500	
*Non-conference game
