= 1947 Clark Panthers football team =

American college football season

1947 Clark Panthers football
- Conference: Southern Intercollegiate Athletic Conference
- Record: 4–3–1 (3–2–1 SIAC)
- Head coach: Marion M. Curry (1st season)

1947 Southern Intercollegiate Athletic Conference football standings
	Conf.					Overall
Team	W		L		T	W		L		T
No. 3 Florida A&M $	5	–	0	–	0	9	–	1	–	0
No. 10 South Carolina State	5	–	0	–	2	7	–	1	–	2
No. 15 Fort Valley State	4	–	0	–	1	7	–	1	–	1
No. 3 (small) LeMoyne	2	–	1	–	0	4	–	1	–	1
Tuskegee	3	–	2	–	1	6	–	4	–	1
No. 21 Clark (GA)	3	–	2	–	1	4	–	3	–	1
No. 18 Lane	2	–	2	–	0	6	–	5	–	0
Morehouse	3	–	4	–	0	3	–	5	–	0
Morris Brown	2	–	4	–	1	3	–	7	–	1
Knoxville	1	–	2	–	1	-	–	-	–	-
Alabama State	2	–	5	–	2	2	–	6	–	2
Fisk	1	–	3	–	1	-	–	-	–	-
No. 7 (small) Alabama A&M	1	–	4	–	1	3	–	5	–	1
Xavier (LA)	0	–	2	–	1	1	–	5	–	1
Benedict	0	–	3	–	2	2	–	4	–	3
$ – Conference champion; Rankings from the Pittsburgh Courier using the Dickinson Ratings System.

The 1947 Clark Panthers football team was an American football team that represented Clark College in the Southern Intercollegiate Athletic Conference (SIAC) during the 1947 college football season. In its first year under head coach Marion M. Curry, the team compiled a 4–3–1 record, 3–2–1 against conference opponents. The team was ranked No. 21 among the nation's black college football teams according to the Pittsburgh Courier and its Dickinson Rating System.

End Grady Williams was the team captain. Other key players included quarterback George Gray and halfbacks Schley Williamson and Johnny Richards. Albert Watts and Dean Charlton Hamilton were assistant coaches.

== Schedule ==
Date	Opponent	Site	Result	Attendance	Source
September 27	Wiley*	Ponce de Leon Park; Atlanta, GA	L 7–40		
October 9	vs. Tuskegee	Rickwood Field; Birmingham, AL	L 0–13		
October 18	at Fort Benning, 25th Combat Team	Doughboy Stadium; Fort Benning, GA	W 13–0		
October 24	at Alabama State	Hornet Stadium; Montgomery, AL	W 12–6		
November 1	Morehouse^{†}	Harper Field; Atlanta, GA	W 12–0	4,000	
November 8	at Xavier (LA)	New Orleans, LA	T 6–6		
November 15	Florida A&M	Atlanta, GA	L 6–33		
*Non-conference game; ^{†}Homecoming
