= Henry N. Tisdale =

American academic administrator (born 1944)

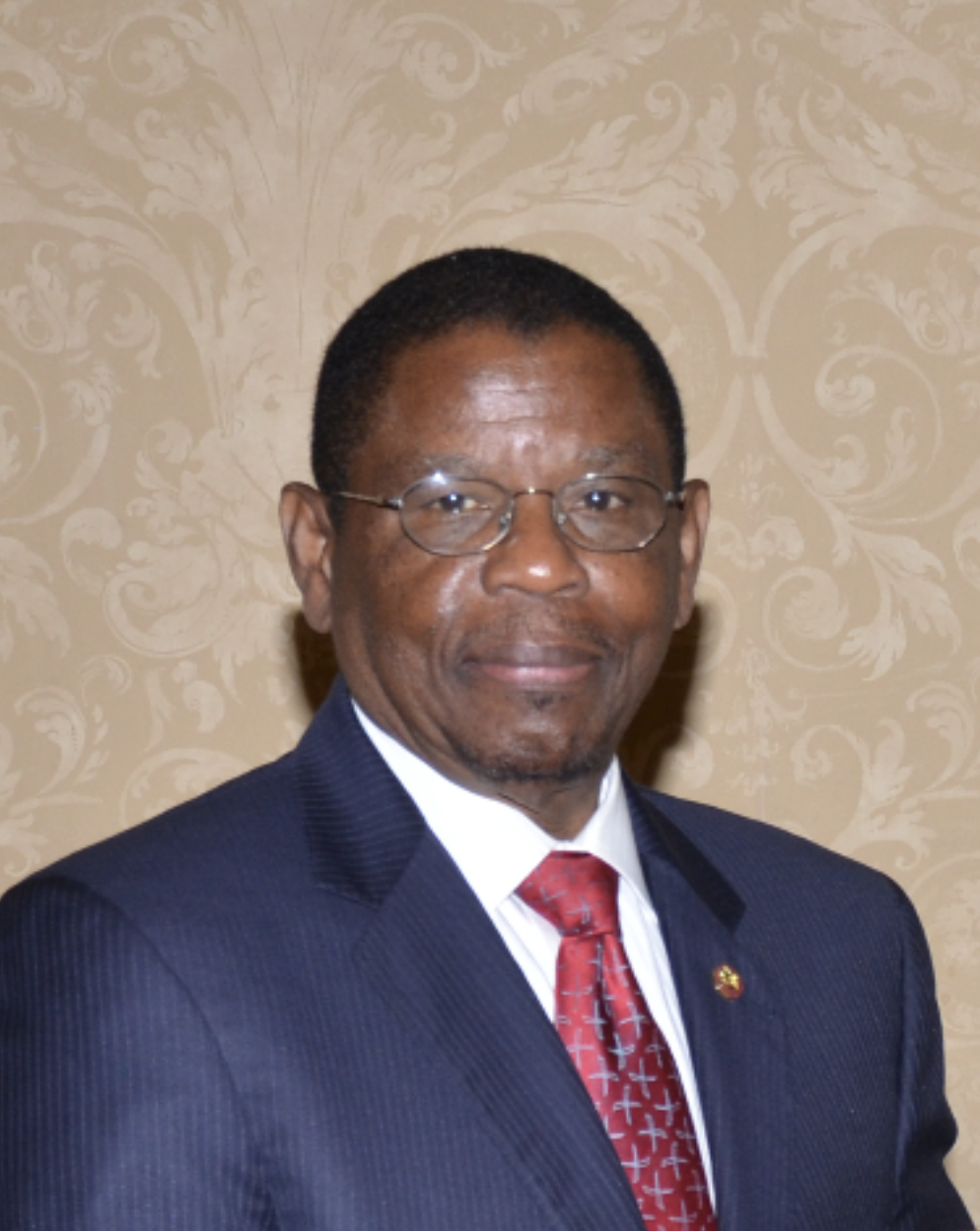
- Claflin University President; Dr. Henry N. Tisdale (2012)

8th President of Claflin University
- In office June 1994 – June 30, 2019
- Preceded by: Oscar A. Rogers
- Succeeded by: Dwaun Warmack

Personal details
- Born: Henry Nehemiah Tisdale; January 13, 1944 (age 82) Kingstree, South Carolina, U.S.
- Spouse: Alice Carson
- Children: 2
- Education: Claflin University, Temple University, Dartmouth College
- Occupation: Academic administrator, educator, mathematician

Henry Nehemiah Tisdale (born 1944) is an American retired academic administrator, educator, and mathematician. He served as the 8th president of Claflin University, a historically black university in Orangeburg, South Carolina from 1994 to 2019. During his tenure, Tisdale oversaw significant academic and infrastructural growth at the institution.

== Biography ==
=== Early life and education ===
Henry Nehemiah Tisdale was born on January 13, 1944, in Kingstree, South Carolina.

He received his elementary education at St. Paul Elementary and Junior High School (1st grade) and Cane Branch School. He then attended Tomlinson High School before transferring to St. Mark Elementary and High School, where he graduated as Valedictorian in 1961.

He earned a Bachelor of Science degree in mathematics from Claflin University in 1965, graduating magna cum laude. He continued his education at Temple University, where he received a Master of Education (Ed.M.) degree in 1967.

Tisdale pursued further studies in mathematics at Dartmouth College, where he earned both a Master of Arts (M.A.) in 1975 and a Doctor of Philosophy (Ph.D.) in 1978. His doctoral dissertation, titled "On Methods for Solving Optimal Stopping Problems", was supervised by Professor James Laurie Snell. He was the first African American to receive a doctorate in mathematics from Dartmouth.

=== Personal life ===
He was married to Alice née Carson, who died in July 2020. In 1996, Alice Carson Tisdale was honored by the Claflin University Board of Trustees by being the namesake of the university's honors college. They had two children — a son and a daughter. Their daughter Danica Tisdale was crowned Miss Georgia in 2004.

== Career ==
Tisdale began his professional career as a mathematics educator in the Philadelphia School District, where he taught from 1965 to 1969. In 1969, he moved on to Delaware State University where he held various academic positions for 24 years: Professor of Mathematics, 1969–1985; assistant director of Institutional Research and Planning, 1978–1985; Assistant Academic Dean for Administration, 1986 to 1987; Senior Vice President and Chief Academic Officer, 1987 to 1994.

In 1994, Tisdale was elected as the 8th president of Claflin University, where he worked from June 1994 to June 2019. During his time as president he constructed many campus buildings including the Living and Learning Center, the Legacy Plaza, the Music Center, a new student residential hall, and a new university chapel. He also strengthened the school endowment and faculty.

He is a member of the Mathematical Association of America.

=== Honors ===
In 2008, Claflin University, under the leadership of Tisdale, was named the number one HBCU by Forbes, as well as ranking in the top 4% of U.S. colleges and universities.

In 2014, Tisdale was honored with South Caroline's Order of the Palmetto, the state's highest civilian honor.

In 2019, Tisdale received Columbia World Affairs Council's Global Vision Award, which is given "to a leader whose contributions have made a significant impact on projecting South Carolina globally."
