= Stanley Conner =

American football player and coach

Current position
- Title: Head coach
- Team: Lane
- Conference: SIAC
- Record: 0–10

Biographical details
- Education: Jackson State

Playing career
- 1980–1983: Jackson State
- 1984: New Orleans Breakers

Coaching career (HC unless noted)
- 1986–1989: Alabama State (WR)(RB)
- 1990: Theodore HS (AL) (RB/QB)
- 1991–1993: LeFlore HS (AL)
- 1994–1996: Alabama A&M (RB/AHC)
- 1997: Lanett HS (AL)
- 1998–2006: Alabama A&M (AHC)
- 2007–2011: Benedict
- 2014–2015: Concordia (AL)
- 2016–2024: Miles (RB)
- 2025–present: Lane

Head coaching record
- Overall: 22–64 (college)

Accomplishments and honors

Awards
- Alabama 6A Coach of the Year (1993)

Stanley Conner is an American college football coach and former professional player. He is the head football coach for Lane College, a position he has held since 2025. He served as the head football coach at Benedict College in Columbia, South Carolina from 2007 until midway through the 2011 season and Concordia College Alabama in Selma, Alabama from 2014 to 2015. Concordia program was forced to shut down to budget cuts after the 2015 season.

== Head coaching record ==
=== College ===
Year	Team	Overall	Conference	Standing	Bowl/playoffs
Benedict Tigers (Southern Intercollegiate Athletic Conference) (2007–201)
2007	Benedict	2–9	1–6	9th	
2008	Benedict	5–6	4–5	T–5th	
2009	Benedict	8–3	6–3	T–3rd	
2010	Benedict	5–6	4–5	T–5th	
2011	Benedict	1–3 (Note: Conner was fired after the first four games of the 2011 season and replaced by James Woody who led the team for the final six games of the season. Benedict finished the year with an overall record of 2–8 overall and a mark of 1–6 in conference play, tying for fourth place in the East Division of the Southern Intercollegiate Athletic Conference (SIAC).)	0–1		
Benedict:		21–27	15–20		
Concordia Hornets (NAIA independent) (2014–2015)
2014	Concordia	1–9			
2015	Concordia	0–10			
Concordia:		1–19			
Lane Dragons (Southern Intercollegiate Athletic Conference) (2025–present)
2025	Lane	0–10	0–8	13th	
2026	Lane	0–8	0–0		
Lane:		0–18	0–8		
Total:		22–64			
