= 1947 South Carolina State Bulldogs football team =

American college football season

1947 South Carolina State Bulldogs football

Pecan Bowl champion

National Bowl, L 0–8 vs. Shaw Pecan Bowl, W 7–0 vs. Allen
- Conference: Southern Intercollegiate Athletic Conference
- Record: 7–1–2 (5–0–2 SIAC)
- Head coach: Oliver C. Dawson (8th season)
- Home stadium: State College Stadium

1947 Southern Intercollegiate Athletic Conference football standings
	Conf.					Overall
Team	W		L		T	W		L		T
No. 3 Florida A&M $	5	–	0	–	0	9	–	1	–	0
No. 10 South Carolina State	5	–	0	–	2	7	–	1	–	2
No. 15 Fort Valley State	4	–	0	–	1	7	–	1	–	1
No. 3 (small) LeMoyne	2	–	1	–	0	4	–	1	–	1
Tuskegee	3	–	2	–	1	6	–	4	–	1
No. 21 Clark (GA)	3	–	2	–	1	4	–	3	–	1
No. 18 Lane	2	–	2	–	0	6	–	5	–	0
Morehouse	3	–	4	–	0	3	–	5	–	0
Morris Brown	2	–	4	–	1	3	–	7	–	1
Knoxville	1	–	2	–	1	-	–	-	–	-
Alabama State	2	–	5	–	2	2	–	6	–	2
Fisk	1	–	3	–	1	-	–	-	–	-
No. 7 (small) Alabama A&M	1	–	4	–	1	3	–	5	–	1
Xavier (LA)	0	–	2	–	1	1	–	5	–	1
Benedict	0	–	3	–	2	2	–	4	–	3
$ – Conference champion; Rankings from the Pittsburgh Courier using the Dickinson Ratings System.

The 1947 South Carolina State Bulldogs football team represented South Carolina State University as a member of the Southern Intercollegiate Athletic Conference (SIAC) during the 1947 college football season. In their eighth season under head coach Oliver C. Dawson, the Bulldogs compiled an overall record of 7–1–2 with a mark of 5–0–2 in conference play, and outscored all opponents by a total of 123 to 46. South Carolina State lost to Shaw in the National Bowl and defeated Allen in the Pecan Bowl. The team ranked No. 10 among the nation's black college football teams according to the Pittsburgh Courier and its Dickinson Rating System.

== Schedule ==
Date	Opponent	Site	Result	Attendance	Source
October 4	at Knoxville	Knoxville, TN	W 13–0		
October 11	Lane	State College Stadium; Orangeburg, SC	W 13–12		
October 18	Claflin*	State College Stadium; Orangeburg, SC	W 28–0		
October 25	at Alabama A&M	Bulldogs Stadium; Normal, AL	T 20–20		
November 1	at Morris Brown	Harper Field; Atlanta, GA	W 13–0		
November 7	at Morehouse	Harper Field; Atlanta, GA	W 12–0	3,000	
November 15	Tuskegee	State College Stadium; Orangeburg, SC	W 12–0	8,000	
November 27	at Benedict	Carolina Stadium; Columbia, SC	T 6–6	8,000	
December 6	vs. Shaw*	Griffith Stadium, Washington, DC (National Bowl)	L 0–8	5,000–6,000	
December 13	vs. Allen*	Orangeburg County Fair Grounds Stadium; Orangeburg, SC (Pecan Bowl)	W 7–0	2,000	
*Non-conference game
