= 1947 Prairie View A&M Panthers football team =

American college football season

1947 Prairie View A&M Panthers football

Fruit Bowl L 0–26 vs. Wilberforce State Prairie View Bowl L 0–13 vs. Texas Southern
- Conference: Southwestern Athletic Conference
- Record: 6–6 (5–2 SWAC)
- Head coach: Billy Nicks (3rd season)

1947 Southwestern Athletic Conference football standings
| | Conf. | | | | | Overall |
| Team | W | | L | | T | W | | L | | T |
|---|---|---|---|---|---|---|---|---|---|---|
| No. 8 Southern $ | 7 | – | 0 | – | 0 | 10 | – | 2 | – | 0 |
| No. 17 Prairie View A&M | 5 | – | 2 | – | 0 | 6 | – | 6 | – | 0 |
| No. 16 Texas College | 3 | – | 1 | – | 1 | 5 | – | 2 | – | 3 |
| Bishop | 3 | – | 2 | – | 2 | 3 | – | 4 | – | 3 |
| No. 20 Wiley | 3 | – | 3 | – | 1 | 4 | – | 3 | – | 2 |
| Langston | 2 | – | 4 | – | 1 | 2 | – | 7 | – | 1 |
| Samuel Huston | 1 | – | 6 | – | 0 | 3 | – | 9 | – | 0 |
| Arkansas AM&N | 0 | – | 6 | – | 1 | 2 | – | 7 | – | 1 |
$ – Conference champion; Rankings from the Pittsburgh Courier using the Dickinson Ratings System.

The 1947 Prairie View A&M Panthers football team was an American football team that represented Prairie View A&M University in the Southwestern Athletic Conference (SWAC) during the 1947 college football season. In their third season under head coach Billy Nicks, the team compiled a 6–6 record, lost to Wilberforce State in the Fruit Bowl and to Texas Southern in the Prairie View Bowl, and was outscored by a total of 137 to 89. Prairie View ranked No. 17 among the nation's black college football teams according to the Pittsburgh Courier and its Dickinson Rating System.

== Schedule ==
| Date | Opponent | Site | Result | Attendance | Source |
|---|---|---|---|---|---|
| September 27 | Samuel Huston | Prairie View, TX | W 12–0 | | |
| October 4 | at Bishop | Fairpark Stadium; Marshall, TX | W 8–6 | | |
| October 13 | vs. Wiley | Cotton Bowl; Dallas, TX (State Fair Classic) | W 12–6 | | |
| October 25 | at Arkansas AM&N | Athletic Field; Pine Bluff, AR | W 6–0 | | |
| October 31 | at Texas State* | Buffalo Stadium; Houston, TX (rivalry) | L 7–13 | | |
| November 8 | at Texas College | Steer Stadium; Tyler, TX | L 6–9 | | |
| November 15 | Grambling* | Prairie View, TX | L 0–13 | | |
| November 22 | Langston | Prairie View, TX | W 19–7 | | |
| November 29 | at Southern | University Stadium; Baton Rouge, LA | L 12–44 | | |
| December 5 | at Paul Quinn* | Katy Park; Waco, TX | W 7–0 | | |
| December 14 | vs. Wilberforce State* | Kezar Stadium; San Francisco, CA (Fruit Bowl) | L 0–26 | 10,000 | |
| January 1, 1948 | at Texas State* | Buffalo Stadium; Houston, TX (Prairie View Bowl) | L 0–12 | | |
*Non-conference game
