= 1947 Texas College Steers football team =

American college football season

1947 Texas College Steers football
- Conference: Southwestern Athletic Conference
- Record: 5–2–3 (3–1–1 SWAC)
- Head coach: Alexander Durley (6th season)

1947 Southwestern Athletic Conference football standings
	Conf.					Overall
Team	W		L		T	W		L		T
No. 8 Southern $	7	–	0	–	0	10	–	2	–	0
No. 17 Prairie View A&M	5	–	2	–	0	6	–	6	–	0
No. 16 Texas College	3	–	1	–	1	5	–	2	–	3
Bishop	3	–	2	–	2	3	–	4	–	3
No. 20 Wiley	3	–	3	–	1	4	–	3	–	2
Langston	2	–	4	–	1	2	–	7	–	1
Samuel Huston	1	–	6	–	0	3	–	9	–	0
Arkansas AM&N	0	–	6	–	1	2	–	7	–	1
$ – Conference champion; Rankings from the Pittsburgh Courier using the Dickinson Ratings System.

The 1947 Texas College Steers football team was an American football team that represented Texas College in the Southwestern Athletic Conference (SWAC) during the 1947 college football season. In their sixth season under head coach Alexander Durley, the team compiled a 5–2–3 record, 3–1–1 against conference opponents. The team was ranked No. 16 among the nation's black college football teams according to the Pittsburgh Courier and its Dickinson Rating System.

== Schedule ==
Date	Opponent	Site	Result	Attendance	Source
September 21	Jarvis*	Steer Stadium; Tyler, TX	W 26–0	1,500	
September 28	Tennessee A&I*	Steer Stadium; Tyler, TX	L 6–34		
October 6	vs. Samuel Huston	Cotton Bowl; Dallas, TX	W 13–7		
October 11	Arkansas AM&N	Steer Stadium; Tyler, TX	T 13–13		
October 18	vs. Langston	Farrington Field; Fort Worth, TX	T 6–6		
November 1	at Southern	University Stadium; Baton Rouge, LA	L 7–35		
November 8	Prairie View^{†}	Steer Stadium; Tyler, TX	W 9–6		
November 15	vs. Bishop	Nacogdoches, TX	T 13–13		
November 22	at Texas State*	Buffalo Stadium; Houston, TX	W 7–0		
November 27	at Wiley^{†}	Wiley Field; Marshall, TX	W 7–6	> 6,000	
*Non-conference game; ^{†}Homecoming
