= Chief Aiken =

American football coach, college athletics administrator, and real estate developer

Biographical details
- Born: January 31, 1893; Dover, Delaware, U.S.
- Died: December 14, 1965; Atlanta, Georgia, U.S.

Coaching career (HC unless noted)
- c. 1922 – 1928: Atlanta
- 1929: Fisk (assistant)
- 1930–1933: Clark (GA)

Administrative career (AD unless noted)
- 1930–?: Clark (GA)

Walter Henry "Chief" Aiken (January 31, 1893 – December 14, 1965) was an American college football coach, athletics administrator, and real estate developer. He served as the head football coach at both Atlanta University and Clark College in Atlanta, which later merged to form Clark Atlanta University. After assisting head football coach Tubby Johnson at Fisk University in 1929, Aiken was hired at the athletic director at Clark in 1930 to succeed Sam B. Taylor.

Aiken was born in Dover, Delaware and was a graduate of Hampton Institute—now known as Hampton University. He died on December 14, 1965, in Atlanta.
