= Leo Twiggs =

American artist (born 1934)

- Born: February 13, 1934 (age 92); St. Stephen, South Carolina, United States
- Education: Claflin University (BA), Art Institute of Chicago, New York University (MA), University of Georgia (Ed.D)
- Occupations: Painter, educator
- Known for: Batik process, founder of I.P. Stanback Museum

Leo Franklin Twiggs (born 1934) is an American painter and educator. He developed the Fine Art Department at South Carolina State University, where he taught from 1964 until 1998. He has presented over seventy five solo exhibitions during his career.

== Biography ==
Leo Franklin Twiggs was born on February 13, 1934, in St. Stephen, South Carolina.

Twiggs received his Bachelor of Arts degree from Claflin University in 1956; studied at the Art Institute of Chicago; and his Master of Arts degree from New York University in 1964. At NYU he studied with Hale Woodruff and Jason Seley. In 1970, Twiggs became the first African American student to receive a Doctor of Education (Ed.D) from the University of Georgia, where he studied with Samuel Adler.

As a professor of art at South Carolina State University, he developed the Art Department and I.P. Stanback Museum. Twiggs was named professor emeritus in 2000. He was the first visual artist to receive the Verner Award (Governor’s Trophy) for outstanding contributions to the arts in South Carolina.

== Artwork ==
Twiggs' paintings utilize a variation of the batik process which he began experimenting with in 1964. This process of painting allows him to create the illusion of subtle textures. His chosen subject matter has included the iconography of the American Civil War, the Confederate flag, Blues music, and rivers. Twiggs' work deals with the role of relics, images, and icons in the culture of the South Eastern United States.

== Awards ==
- 2016: Order of Palmetto, South Carolina's highest civilian honor
- 2017: Elizabeth O'Neill Verner Governor's Award for the Arts, Lifetime Achievement Award winner
- 2018: Society 1858 Prize
