= James Woody =

American football player

Playing career
- 1981–1984: Central State
- Position: Quarterback

Coaching career (HC unless noted)
- 1987–1995: Central State (OC/QB)
- 1996–2005: Tuskegee (OC)
- 2006–2009: Jackson State (OC)
- 2011–2014: Benedict

Administrative career (AD unless noted)
- 2016–present: Jackson Public Schools (MS) (assistant AD)

Head coaching record
- Overall: 10–26

Accomplishments and honors

Awards
- Central State University Hall of Fame (1991)

James Woody is an American college football coach and former player. From 2011 to 2014, he served as the head football coach at Benedict College in Columbia, South Carolina. Woody played college football as a quarterback at Central State University in Wilberforce, Ohio.

== Head coaching record ==
Year	Team	Overall	Conference	Standing	Bowl/playoffs
Benedict Tigers (Southern Intercollegiate Athletic Conference) (2011–2014)
2011	Benedict	1–5 (Note: Stanley Conner served as Benedict's head coach for the first four games of the 2011 season before he was fired. Woody replaced him and led the team for the final six games of the season. Benedict finished the year with an overall record of 2–8 overall and a mark of 1–6 in conference play.)	1–5	T–4th (East)	
2012	Benedict	1–9	1–6	T–4th (East)	
2013	Benedict	4–6	2–2	3rd (East)	
2014	Benedict	4–6	2–5	4th (East)	
Benedict:		10–26	6–18		
Total:		10–26			
