= 1947 Southern Jaguars football team =

American college football season

1947 Southern Jaguars football

SWAC champion

Yam Bowl, W 46–0 vs. Fort Valley State
- Conference: Southwestern Athletic Conference
- Record: 10–2 (7–0 SWAC)
- Head coach: Ace Mumford (12th season)
- Home stadium: University Stadium

1947 Southwestern Athletic Conference football standings
	Conf.					Overall
Team	W		L		T	W		L		T
No. 8 Southern $	7	–	0	–	0	10	–	2	–	0
No. 17 Prairie View A&M	5	–	2	–	0	6	–	6	–	0
No. 16 Texas College	3	–	1	–	1	5	–	2	–	3
Bishop	3	–	2	–	2	3	–	4	–	3
No. 20 Wiley	3	–	3	–	1	4	–	3	–	2
Langston	2	–	4	–	1	2	–	7	–	1
Samuel Huston	1	–	6	–	0	3	–	9	–	0
Arkansas AM&N	0	–	6	–	1	2	–	7	–	1
$ – Conference champion; Rankings from the Pittsburgh Courier using the Dickinson Ratings System.

The 1947 Southern Jaguars football team was an American football team that represented Southern University in the 1947 college football season. In their 12th season under head coach Ace Mumford, the Jaguars compiled a 10–2 record, won the SWAC championship, shut out eight of 12 opponents, defeated Xavier (LA) in the Creole Classic and Fort Valley State in the Yam Bowl, and outscored all opponents by a total of 380 to 53. The team played its home games at University Stadium in Baton Rouge, Louisiana.

Southern ranked No. 8 among the nation's black college football teams according to the Pittsburgh Courier and its Dickinson Rating System.

== Schedule ==
Date	Opponent	Site	Result	Attendance	Source
September 27	Texas State*	University Stadium; Baton Rouge, LA	W 51–0		
October 4	at Grambling*	Tiger Field; Grambling, LA (rivalry)	L 6–21	5,000	
October 11	at Samuel Huston	Anderson High School Stadium; Austin, TX	W 32–0		
October 18	Arkansas AM&N	University Stadium; Baton Rouge, LA	W 25–0		
October 25	at Langston	Anderson Field; Langston, OK	W 13–0		
November 1	Texas College	University Stadium; Baton Rouge, LA	W 35–7		
November 8	Bishop	University Stadium; Baton Rouge, LA	W 58–0		
November 15	Wiley	University Stadium; Baton Rouge, LA	W 23–0		
November 22	at Florida A&M*	Bragg Stadium; Tallahassee, FL	L 9–13		
November 29	Prairie View A&M	University Stadium; Baton Rouge, LA	W 44–12		
December 6	at Xavier (LA)*	Xavier Stadium; New Orleans, LA (Creole Classic)	W 39–0	6,000	
December 25	vs. Fort Valley State*	Dal-Hi Stadium; Dallas, TX (Yam Bowl)	W 46–0	1,500	
*Non-conference game
