= Daryl Hart =

American football player (born 1961)

No. 57
- Positions: Wide receiver, defensive back

Personal information
- Born: January 10, 1961 (age 65); Memphis, Tennessee
- Listed height: 5 ft 10 in (1.78 m)
- Listed weight: 175 lb (79 kg)

Career information
- High school: Memphis Douglass
- College: Lane

Career history
- Buffalo Bills (1984)*; Oakland Invaders (1984-85); Chicago Bruisers (1987-88); Orlando Predators (1991)
- * Offseason or practice squad member only

Daryl Hart (born January 10, 1961) is an American former football defensive back and wide receiver who played in the United States Football League (USFL) and in the Arena Football League (AFL). He played college football for Lane.

He was drafted by the Buffalo Bills in the second round of the 1984 NFL Supplemental Draft. He became a two-year player in 1984-85 for the Oakland Invaders of the United States Football League (USFL). He also played Arena League professional football with the Chicago Bruisers and the Orlando Predators, culminating his career in 1991. For his offensive Arena League career he caught 32 passes for 408 and 8 touchdowns.

Hart never played in an NFL game. Counting the USFL and Arena League however, he played in a total of 50 professional football games. He was a starter in one game with the Oakland Invaders. As an Arena football player on defense, he had 109 tackles and 7 interceptions.
