= 1947 Florida A&M Rattlers football team =

American college football season

1947 Florida A&M Rattlers football

SIAC champion

Orange Blossom Classic, W 7–0 vs. Hampton
- Conference: Southern Intercollegiate Athletic Conference
- Record: 9–1 (5–0 SIAC)
- Head coach: Jake Gaither (3rd season)
- Home stadium: Bragg Stadium

1947 Southern Intercollegiate Athletic Conference football standings
| | Conf. | | | | | Overall |
| Team | W | | L | | T | W | | L | | T |
|---|---|---|---|---|---|---|---|---|---|---|
| No. 3 Florida A&M $ | 5 | – | 0 | – | 0 | 9 | – | 1 | – | 0 |
| No. 10 South Carolina State | 5 | – | 0 | – | 2 | 7 | – | 1 | – | 2 |
| No. 15 Fort Valley State | 4 | – | 0 | – | 1 | 7 | – | 1 | – | 1 |
| No. 3 (small) LeMoyne | 2 | – | 1 | – | 0 | 4 | – | 1 | – | 1 |
| Tuskegee | 3 | – | 2 | – | 1 | 6 | – | 4 | – | 1 |
| No. 21 Clark (GA) | 3 | – | 2 | – | 1 | 4 | – | 3 | – | 1 |
| No. 18 Lane | 2 | – | 2 | – | 0 | 6 | – | 5 | – | 0 |
| Morehouse | 3 | – | 4 | – | 0 | 3 | – | 5 | – | 0 |
| Morris Brown | 2 | – | 4 | – | 1 | 3 | – | 7 | – | 1 |
| Knoxville | 1 | – | 2 | – | 1 | - | – | - | – | - |
| Alabama State | 2 | – | 5 | – | 2 | 2 | – | 6 | – | 2 |
| Fisk | 1 | – | 3 | – | 1 | - | – | - | – | - |
| No. 7 (small) Alabama A&M | 1 | – | 4 | – | 1 | 3 | – | 5 | – | 1 |
| Xavier (LA) | 0 | – | 2 | – | 1 | - | – | - | – | - |
| Benedict | 0 | – | 3 | – | 2 | 2 | – | 4 | – | 3 |
$ – Conference champion; Rankings from the Pittsburgh Courier using the Dickinson Ratings System.

The 1947 Florida A&M Rattlers football team was an American football team that represented Florida A&M College as a member of the Southern Intercollegiate Athletic Conference (SIAC) during the 1947 college football season. In their third season under head coach Jake Gaither, the Rattlers compiled a 9–1 record, including a victory over Hampton in the Orange Blossom Classic. The Rattlers played their home games at Sampson-Bragg Field in Tallahassee, Florida.

Florida A&M ranked No. 3 among the nation's black college football teams according to the Pittsburgh Courier and its Dickinson Rating System.

Key players included quarterbacks Jim Williams and Leroy Cromartie, fullback Bernie Ingraham, halfback Elman Williams, running back Ulysses Curtis, end Nathaniel Powell, William Rolle, tackle John Burgess, and center Wilbur Gary.

Prior to the team's October 18 game against Morris Brown, the university dedicated Bragg Stadium in honor of Jubie Bragg and his son Eugene Bragg.

== Schedule ==
| Date | Opponent | Site | Result | Attendance | Source |
|---|---|---|---|---|---|
| September 27 | Bethune–Cookman* | Bragg Stadium; Tallahassee, FL (rivalry) | W 6–0 | | |
| October 4 | at Shaw* | Chavis Park; Raleigh, NC | L 0–19 | | |
| October 10 | at Alabama State | Hornet Stadium; Montgomery, AL | W 58–12 | | |
| October 18 | Morris Brown | Bragg Stadium; Tallahassee, FL | W 6–0 | 6,000 | |
| October 25 | Knoxville | Centennial Field; Tallahassee, FL | W 26–0 | 5,000 | |
| November 1 | at Kentucky State* | Frankfort, KY | W 14–12 | | |
| November 8 | at Tuskegee | Alumni Bowl; Tuskegee, AL | W 19–6 | | |
| November 15 | at Clark (GA) | Ponce de Leon Park; Atlanta, GA | W 33–6 | | |
| November 22 | Southern* | Bragg Stadium; Tallahassee, FL | W 13–9 | | |
| December 6 | vs. No. 4 Hampton* | Burdine Stadium; Miami, FL (Orange Blossom Classic) | W 7–0 | 19,000 | |
*Non-conference game; Rankings from Coaches' Poll released prior to the game
