= Dwaun Warmack =

American university administrator

Dwaun J. Warmack

9th President of Claflin University
- Incumbent
- Assumed office August 1, 2019
- Preceded by: Henry N. Tisdale

19th President of Harris–Stowe State University
- In office July 14, 2014 – July 31, 2019
- Preceded by: Albert Walker
- Succeeded by: Corey S. Bradford

Personal details
- Born: c. 1977 Detroit, Michigan, U.S.
- Education: Delta State University; Union University; Harvard University

Dwaun J. Warmack (born c. 1977) is an Amеrican univеrsity administrator and currеnt prеsidеnt of Claflin University, a historically black institution in Orangеburg, South Carolina. Hе became the 9th President of Claflin University in 2019. Before his tеnurе at Claflin, Warmack was thе 19th Prеsidеnt of Harris–Stowe State University, in St. Louis, Missouri, from July 2014 to July 2019.

== Education ==
Warmack attended Jared W. Finney High School in Detroit, Michigan. He graduated from Delta State University with a bachelor's degree in education and master's degree in sociology in 2006, the first generation of his family to do so. He received his doctorate in educational leadership with a specialization in higher education from Union University in Jackson, Tennessee in 2011. He completed his post-doctoral studies in educational leadership at Harvard University School of Education in 2015.

== Career ==
In 1999, his work in higher education began at his alma mater, Delta State University, as coordinator of student development and activities and as a financial aid counselor until 2002 when he was then promoted to director of multicultural affairs and multicultural center.

He worked at Western Carolina University (WCU), as an associate director of the University Center and director of programs, before joining Rhodes. In July 2005, he began at Rhodes College in Memphis, Tennessee, as associate dean of students, where he founded the Western North Carolina Minority Networking Program. From 2010 until 2014, he was vice president for enrollment management and student affairs and senior vice president of administration and student services at Bethune-Cookman University.

Warmack became the 19th president of Harris–Stowe State University on July 14, 2014, succeeding Albert Walker. The following year, there was a 25% increase in enrollment, approximately 9 million dollars in external funding, and the passing of Senate Bill 334, which allows the university to grant master's degrees. He left Harris–Stowe in July 31, 2019.

On August 1, 2019, Warmack became the ninth president of Claflin University, succeeding Henry N. Tisdale. Warmack created several new programs at Claflin, including Claflin University's Quality Enhancement Plan, CU-S.T.A.R.S, and the "Elevation and Transformation" initiative. This included the Pathways from Prison Program, a program in the Center for Social Justice that aimed to assist currently or formerly incarcerated individuals.

In March 2022, Warmack hosted a ceremony for a new three-story, 85,000-square-foot Student Center on Claflin's campus. The project received funding of 30 million dollars and was expected to be opened in late 2023. Later in May, he signed an agreement with London Metropolitan University Vice-Chancellor Lynn Dobbs to begin an academic partnership between Claflin and London Metropolitan, offering research opportunities and study abroad programs.

== Affiliations, honors, and awards ==
In 2025, the National Association of Student Personnel Administrators (NASPA) selected Warmack for its 2025 President's Award. Also, in 2025, he was elected to serve as Vice Chair of the South Carolina Higher Education Tuition Grants Commission.

In 2024, Orangeburg's Times and Democrat newspaper named Warmack its Person of the Year, citing his leadership and campus initiatives since his arrival in August 2019.

In 2000, Warmack was inducted into Omicron Delta Kappa as a faculty and staff member at Delta State University.

He has appeared in the Detroit Free Press and on NPR to discuss educational issues that impact the nation. He currently is on the boards of Cortex, the Saint Louis Science Center, the St. Louis Regional Chamber, The Muny, the Grand Center and the United Way of Greater St. Louis, and Greater St. Louis Area Council Boy Scouts of America. Warmack was also selected as a 2019 Eisenhower Fellow. He was one out of 13 U.S. leaders selected and the only one from an academic institution. His research was on reducing mass incarceration through education and rehabilitation.
