= Tubby Johnson =

American sports coach and administrator (1899–1954)

Biographical details
- Born: February 19, 1899; Kentucky, U.S.
- Died: May 2, 1954 (aged 55); Nashville, Tennessee, U.S.

Playing career

Football
- c. 1920: Fisk
- Position: Halfback

Coaching career (HC unless noted)

Football
- 1924: Clark (GA)
- 1925–1941: Fisk

Basketball
- ?: Fisk

Administrative career (AD unless noted)
- ?–1954: Fisk

Henderson Andrew "Tubby" Johnson (February 19, 1899 – May 2, 1954) was an American football and basketball coach, college athletics administrator, and educator. He served as the head football coach at Clark University—later merged into Clark Atlanta University—for one season, in 1924, and Fisk University in Nashville, Tennessee from 1925 to 1941.

A native of Lexington, Kentucky, Johnson attended Fisk, where he played football as a halfback for four years before graduating in 1922. He earned a Master of Arts degree in physical education from Columbia University in 1936.

Johnson died of a heart attack, on May 2, 1954, at Hubbard Memorial Hospital in Nashville. Later that year, Fisk named its gymnasium in Johnson's honor.

== Head coaching record ==
=== Football ===
Year	Team	Overall	Conference	Standing	Bowl/playoffs
Clark Panthers (Southern Intercollegiate Athletic Conference) (1924)
1924	Clark	1–2			
Clark:		1–2			
Fisk Bulldogs (Southern Intercollegiate Athletic Conference) (1925–1941)
1925	Fisk	1–4–1			
1926	Fisk	2–5–1			
1927	Fisk	3–2–3	1–2–2	7th	
1928	Fisk	5–2–2	4–1	T–3rd	
1929	Fisk	8–1			
1930	Fisk	10–1	2–0	2nd	
1931	Fisk	2–6	1–2	6th	
1932	Fisk	6–2	3–1	3rd	
1933	Fisk	3–5–1			
1934	Fisk	0–5–1	0–4	12th	
1935	Fisk	1–4–1	1–4	9th	
1936	Fisk	0–6–1	0–5–1	13th	
1937	Fisk	0–4–3	0–4–1	12th	
1938	Fisk	2–3–2	2–3–1	T–8th	
1939	Fisk	0–7	0–5	11th	
1940	Fisk	?	0–3	NA	
1941	Fisk	2–1–3	1–1–1	T–5th	
Fisk:					
Total:					
