= Bethune–Cookman Wildcats football =

College football team

2026 Bethune–Cookman Wildcats football team
- First season: 1925; 101 years ago
- Head coach: Raymond Woodie Jr. 4th season, 11–25 (.306)
- Location: Daytona Beach, Florida
- Stadium: Daytona Stadium (capacity: 10,000)
- NCAA division: Division I FCS
- Conference: SWAC
- Colors: Maroon and gold
- All-time record: 511–355–26 (.587)

Black college national championships
- 2010, 2013

Conference championships
- SEAC: 1942, 1947 SIAC: 1952, 1973, 1975, 1976 MEAC: 1984, 1988, 2002, 2010, 2012, 2013, 2014, 2015
- Rivalries: Florida A&M (rivalry)
- Fight song: Let's Go Wildcats
- Mascot: Wil D Cat
- Marching band: The Marching Wildcats
- Website: bcuathletics.com

The Bethune–Cookman Wildcats football team represents Bethune–Cookman University in the sport of college football. The Wildcats compete in the Division I Football Championship Subdivision (FCS) of the National Collegiate Athletic Association (NCAA). Starting with the fall 2021 season, they compete in the East Division of the Southwestern Athletic Conference (SWAC), after having been members of the Mid-Eastern Athletic Conference (MEAC) since 1979. They play their home games at Daytona Stadium. The Wildcats have won two black college football national championships and seven MEAC titles in the history of their football program.

== History ==
=== Classifications ===
- 1956–1972: NCAA College Division
- 1973–1979: NCAA Division II
- 1980–present: NCAA Division I-AA/FCS

=== Conference memberships ===
- 1925–1941: Independent
- 1942–1949: Southeastern Athletic Conference
- 1950–1979: Southern Intercollegiate Athletic Conference
- 1979–2020: Mid-Eastern Athletic Conference
- 2021–present: Southwestern Athletic Conference

== Conference championships ==
Year	Conference	Overall record	Conference record	Head coach
1942	SEAC	6–1	6–1	Preston Peterson
1947	SEAC	10–2	0–0	Bunky Matthews
1952	SIAC	9–1	5–1	Bunky Matthews
1973	SIAC	9–2	5–0	Cy McClairen
1975	SIAC	10–1	4–1	Charles W. Moore
1976	SIAC	9–2	4–1	Andy Hinson
1984	MEAC	7–3	4–0	Larry Little
1988*	MEAC	5–6	4–2	Larry Little
2002	MEAC	11–2	7–1	Alvin Wyatt
2010*	MEAC	10–2	7–1	Brian Jenkins
2012	MEAC	8–3	8–0	Brian Jenkins
2013*	MEAC	10–3	5–1	Brian Jenkins
2014*	MEAC	9–3	6–2	Brian Jenkins
2015*	MEAC	9–2	7–1	Terry Sims
Total		14		
* Denotes a tie for first place and conference co-champion

== Black college football national championships ==
The Wildcats have won two black college football national championships.

Year	Conference	Overall record	Conference record	Head coach
2010	MEAC	10–2	7–1	Brian Jenkins
2013	MEAC	10–3	5–1	Brian Jenkins
Total		2		

== Postseason appearances ==
=== Bowl games ===
Bethune–Cookman has participated in ten bowl games, with the Wildcats garnering a record of 6–4.

Season	Coach	Bowl	Opponent	Result
1945	Preston Peterson	Coconut Bowl	Albany State	W 32–0
1946	Preston Peterson	Coconut Bowl	Columbia Sports Club	W 13–0
1946	Bunky Matthews	Lions Bowl	Grambling	L 47–6
1947	Bunky Matthews	Flower Bowl	Lane	W 6–0

=== Playoff appearances ===
==== NCAA Division I-AA/FCS ====
The Wildcats have made five appearances in the Division I-AA/FCS playoffs, with an overall record of 0–5.

Year	Round	Opponent	Result
2002	First Round	Georgia Southern	L, 0–34
2003	First Round	Florida Atlantic	L, 24–32
2010	Second Round	New Hampshire	L, 20–45
2012	First Round	Coastal Carolina	L, 14–24
2013	First Round	Coastal Carolina	L, 24–48

==== NCAA Division II ====
The Wildcats have made one appearance in the Division II playoffs, with an overall record of 0–1.

Year	Round	Opponent	Result
1977	Quarterfinals	UC Davis	L, 16–34

== Alumni in the NFL ==
Over 31 Bethune–Cookman alumni have played in the NFL, including:

- Leroy Allen
- Boobie Clark
- Nick Collins
- Charles Cornelius
- Jawill Davis
- Ryan Davis
- Roger Jackson
- Larry Little
- Rashean Mathis
- Jack "Cy" McClairen
- Maulty Moore
- Booker Reese
- Tony Samuels
- Howard Smothers
- Eric Weems
- Lee Williams
- Alvin Wyatt
- Antwuan Wyatt

== Pro Football Hall of Fame ==
One former BCU football player has been inducted into the Pro Football Hall of Fame.

Year inducted	Player	POS	Seasons at BCU	NFL team(s)	Years with NFL team(s)
1993	Larry Little	G	1963–1966	San Diego Chargers	1967–1968
1993	Larry Little	G	1963–1966	Miami Dolphins	1969–1980

== Buck Buchanan Award ==
The Buck Buchanan Award is given to the most outstanding defensive player in Division I FCS. In 2002, Rashean Mathis of Bethune–Cookman won the award. Mathis holds the NCAA FCS/ I-AA records for most interceptions in a season (14), most interceptions during a career (31), most yards on interception returns in a season (455), and most yards on interception returns in a career (682).

== Future non-conference opponents ==
Announced schedules as of February 3, 2026

2026	2028
at UCF	at USF
Stetson	
Virginia–Lynchburg	
South Carolina State	

== See also ==
- Florida Classic
