= 1947 Lane Dragons football team =

American college football season

1947 Lane Dragons football

Flower Bowl, L 0–6 vs. Bethune–Cookman
- Conference: Southern Intercollegiate Athletic Conference
- Record: 6–5 (2–2 SIAC)
- Head coach: Edward Clemons (11th season)

1947 Southern Intercollegiate Athletic Conference football standings
	Conf.					Overall
Team	W		L		T	W		L		T
No. 3 Florida A&M $	5	–	0	–	0	9	–	1	–	0
No. 10 South Carolina State	5	–	0	–	2	7	–	1	–	2
No. 15 Fort Valley State	4	–	0	–	1	7	–	1	–	1
No. 3 (small) LeMoyne	2	–	1	–	0	4	–	1	–	1
Tuskegee	3	–	2	–	1	6	–	4	–	1
No. 21 Clark (GA)	3	–	2	–	1	4	–	3	–	1
No. 18 Lane	2	–	2	–	0	6	–	5	–	0
Morehouse	3	–	4	–	0	3	–	5	–	0
Morris Brown	2	–	4	–	1	3	–	7	–	1
Knoxville	1	–	2	–	1	-	–	-	–	-
Alabama State	2	–	5	–	2	2	–	6	–	2
Fisk	1	–	3	–	1	-	–	-	–	-
No. 7 (small) Alabama A&M	1	–	4	–	1	3	–	5	–	1
Xavier (LA)	0	–	2	–	1	-	–	-	–	-
Benedict	0	–	3	–	2	2	–	4	–	3
$ – Conference champion; Rankings from the Pittsburgh Courier using the Dickinson Ratings System.

The 1947 Lane Dragons football team, also sometimes known as the "Red Dragons", was an American football team that represented Lane College in the Southern Intercollegiate Athletic Conference (SIAC) during the 1947 college football season. In their 11th season under head coach Edward Clemon, the Dragons compiled a 6–5 record, lost to Bethune–Cookman in the Flower Bowl, and outscored all opponents by a total of 194 to 87. The team was ranked No. 18 among the nation's black college football teams according to the Pittsburgh Courier and its Dickinson Rating System. The team played its home games at Lane College Athletic Field and Rothrock Field, both located in Jackson, Tennessee.

Key players included Wild Bill Battles at quarterback, team captain Alex Moore at tackle, Country Reeves at center, and William Green at fullback.

== Schedule ==
Date	Opponent	Site	Result	Attendance	Source
September 27	Fort Benning*	Rothrock Field; Jackson, TN	W 53–6		
October 4	Fort Knox*	Lane College Athletic Field; Jackson, TN	W 32–0		
October 11	at South Carolina State	State College Stadium; Orangeburg, SC	L 12–13		
October 18	Alabama A&M	Lane College Athletic Field; Jackson, TN	W 26–0		
October 25	at Wiley*	Wiley Field; Marshall, TX	L 7–22		
November 1	at Louisville Municipal*	Central Stadium; Louisville, KY	W 19–13	3,000	
November 8	vs. Lincoln (MO)*	Public School Stadium; St. Louis, MO	L 0–6		
November 15	Fisk	Rothrock Field; Jackson, TN	L 6–9		
November 22	Bishop*^{†}	Rothrock Field; Jackson, TN	W 13–6		
November 27	at LeMoyne	Washington Stadium; Memphis, TN	W 26–6		
January 1, 1948	vs. Bethune–Cookman	Jacksonville, FL (Flower Bowl)	L 0–6	3,000	
*Non-conference game; ^{†}Homecoming
