= South Carolina State Bulldogs and Lady Bulldogs =

Intercollegiate sports teams of South Carolina State University

- University: South Carolina State University
- Nickname: Bulldogs
- NCAA: Division I (FCS)
- Conference: MEAC (primary); Independent (women's soccer)
- Athletic director: Oliver "Buddy" Pough
- Location: Orangeburg, South Carolina
- Varsity teams: 14 (6 men's, 8 women's)
- Football stadium: Oliver C. Dawson Stadium
- Basketball arena: SHM Memorial Center
- Softball stadium: Lady Bulldog Softball Field
- Soccer stadium: Oliver C. Dawson Stadium
- Tennis venue: Hardeep Judge Tennis Center
- Outdoor track and field venue: Lorry H. Dawkins Track Facility
- Volleyball arena: Dukes Gymnasium
- Colors: Garnet and blue
- Website: www.scsuathletics.com
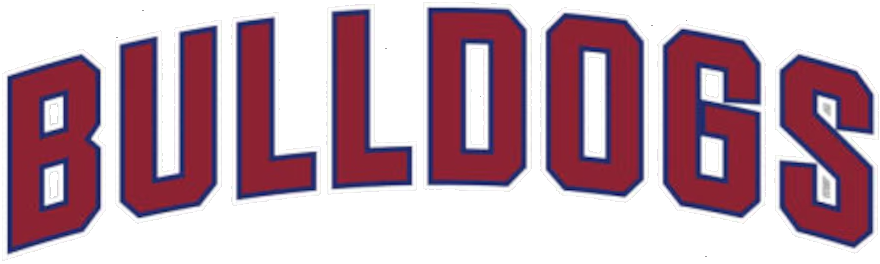

The South Carolina State Bulldogs and Lady Bulldogs (also SC State) sponsors fourteen sports teams representing South Carolina State University in Orangeburg, South Carolina in intercollegiate athletics, including men’s and women's basketball, cross country, tennis, and indoor and outdoor track and field; women's-only soccer, softball, and volleyball; and men's-only football. The Bulldogs compete in the NCAA Division I Football Championship Subdivision (FCS) and most teams are members of the Mid-Eastern Athletic Conference; the women's soccer team plays as an independent.

== Teams ==
Men's sports	Women's sports
Basketball	Basketball
Cross country	Bowling
Football	Cross country
Tennis	Soccer
Track and field^{†}	Softball
	Tennis
	Track and field^{†}
	Volleyball
† – Track and field includes both indoor and outdoor
