= Clifford Paul =

American football player and coach

Biographical details
- Born: c. 1931
- Education: NYU; Florida A&M

Coaching career (HC unless noted)

Football
- 1960–1961: Edward Waters (assistant)
- 1962–1964: Edward Waters
- 1965–1969: Texas Southern

Track
- c. 1962–1964: Edward Waters

Administrative career (AD unless noted)
- 1960–1965: Edward Waters

Head coaching record
- Overall: 52–20–4 (football)

Accomplishments and honors

Championships
- Football; 3 SEAC (1962–1964); 1 SWAC (1968)

Awards
- Football; SEAC Coach of the Year (1964) Track; 3× SEAC Coach of the Year (1962–1964) Football (1964)

Clifford "Jack" Paul (born c. 1931) is an American former college football and track coach. He served as the head football coach at Edward Waters College in Jacksonville, Florida. In 1965, he was hired as the head football coach at Texas Southern University, where he remained for five seasons. He was fired from his post at Texas Southern on June 30, 1970.

== Head coaching record ==
=== Football ===
Year	Team	Overall	Conference	Standing	Bowl/playoffs
Edward Waters Tigers (Southeastern Athletic Conference) (1962–1964)
1962	Edward Waters	6–2	3–2	2nd	
1963	Edward Waters	8–1	3–1	2nd	
1964	Edward Waters	9–0	4–0	1st	
Edward Waters:		23–3	10–3		
Texas Southern Tigers (Southwestern Athletic Conference) (1965–1970)
1965	Texas Southern	5–4–1	4–2–1	T–2nd	
1966	Texas Southern	5–4–1	4–2–1	3rd	
1967	Texas Southern	7–3	5–2	2nd	
1968	Texas Southern	6–4	6–1	T–1st	
1969	Texas Southern	4–3–2	3–3–1	4th	
Texas Southern:		27–18–4	22–10–3		
Total:		50–21–4			
National championship Conference title Conference division title or championship game berth
