= Samuel Adler (artist) =

American artist (1898–1979)

Samuel Marcus Adler (1898, New York City – 1979, New York City) was an American painter and educator.

== Early life and education ==
Samuel Marcus Adler was born on 1898, in New York City. He studied at the National Academy of Design in New York City, with Leon Kroll and Charles Hinton.

Adler was professor of art at New York University and the University of Illinois. He was a visiting professor at the University of Georgia.

== Career ==
His work was exhibited at the Art Institute of Chicago, Corcoran Gallery of Art, Metropolitan Museum of Art, Whitney Museum, and the Smithsonian American Art Museum. His papers are held at the Archives of American Art.

== Bibliography ==
- Samuel Adler: recent collages, Georgia Museum of Art, 1968
- Samuel M. Adler: 25 years of the image of man '47-'72, Frank Rehn Gallery, 1972
