= South Carolina Athletic Hall of Fame =

Coordinates: 34°00′19″N 81°02′11″W

The South Carolina Athletic Hall of Fame is an athletics hall of fame in the U.S. state of South Carolina. It is in the capital city of Columbia.
