= Flower Bowl (bowl game) =

Annual post-season American college football bowl game

The Flower Bowl was an annual post-season American college football bowl game played at Durkee Field in Jacksonville, Florida, from 1942 to 1948.

== Game results ==
Date	Winner		Loser		Ref.
January 1, 1942	Johnson C. Smith	13	Lane	12	
January 2, 1943	North Carolina A&T	14	Southern	12	
January 1, 1944	Allen	33	Winston-Salem State	0	
January 1, 1945	Texas College	18	North Carolina A&T	0	
January 1, 1946	Louisiana Normal ((Grambling)	19	Lane	6	
January 1, 1947	Delaware State	7	Florida N&I	6	
January 1, 1948	Bethune–Cookman	6	Lane	0	

Note, the 1949 contest scheduled between Bethune–Cookman and Florida A&M did not occur.

== See also ==
- List of college bowl games
