= Florida Memorial Lions =

Athletic teams representing Florida Memorial University

- University: Florida Memorial University
- Nickname: Lions
- Association: NAIA
- Conference: The Sun (primary)
- Athletic director: Chandra Dorsey-Felton (interim)
- Location: Miami Gardens, Florida
- Varsity teams: 12 (5 men's, 7 women's)
- Football stadium: Betty T. Ferguson Recreational Complex
- Basketball arena: Wellness Center
- Baseball stadium: Harry T. Moore Field
- Soccer stadium: Dr. Lester Brown Park
- Colors: Royal Blue, Orange, and White
- Website: fmuathletics.com
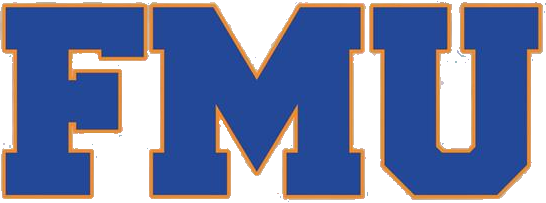

The Florida Memorial Lions are the athletic teams that represent Florida Memorial University, located in Miami Gardens, Florida, in intercollegiate sports as a member of the National Association of Intercollegiate Athletics (NAIA), primarily competing in the Sun Conference (formerly known as the Florida Sun Conference (FSC) until after the 2007–08 school year) since the 1990–91 academic year. Its football program began competing in the Mid-South Conference (MSC) from the 2020 to 2021 fall seasons.

== Varsity teams ==
Florida Memorial competes in 12 intercollegiate varsity sports:

Men's sports	Women's sports
Baseball	Basketball
Basketball	Beach volleyball
Football	Flag football
Soccer	Soccer
Track and field	Softball
	Track and field
	Volleyball

=== Football ===
From 1945 to 1958, Florida Memorial—then known as Florida Normal and Industrial Institute—compiled a record of 41–25–6 with a break in the 1949 season. The team competed as a member of the Southeastern Athletic Conference (SEAC). The last football game played by the Lions was a 14–8 win over Albany State in 1958 before a 62-year hiatus. The football program was reinstated in 2020. On October 23, 2021, the Lions won their first game since the reinstatement of the program against the Union Bulldogs of Barbourville, Kentucky by a score of 41–17.

== Facilities ==
Florida Memorial's facilities include:

Venue	Sport(s)	Ref.
Betty T. Ferguson Recreational Complex	Football; Track and field	
Wellness Center	Basketball; Volleyball	
Harry T. Moore Field	Baseball	
Dr. Lester Brown Park (Note: Not owned by the university but part of Miami Gardens.)	Soccer	
