= Southeastern Athletic Conference =

The Southeastern Athletic Conference (SEAC), also known as the Southeastern Intercollegiate Athletic Conference, was an intercollegiate athletic conference of historically black colleges and universities (HBCUs). The conference was founded as the Southeastern Athletic Association, in January 1940, at a meeting held at Columbia, South Carolina. It had five charter members, Fort Valley State College (now known as Fort Valley State University) of Fort Valley, Georgia, and four schools that had previously been members of the South Atlantic Athletic Conference (SAAC), also known as the South Atlantic Intercollegiate Athletic Association (SAIAA): Allen University of Columbia, South Carolina, Morris College of Sumter, South Carolina, Paine College of Augusta, Georgia, and Georgia State College (now known as Savannah State University) of Savannah, Georgia. Bethune–Cookman College—now known as Bethune–Cookman University— of Daytona Beach, Florida, was accepted as the conference SEAC's sixth member in December 1941. Claflin College—now known as Claflin University—of Orangeburg, South Carolina, joined the conference in September 1945. The following year, the SEAC increased its membership to nine schools with the addition of Albany State College (now known as Albany State University) of Albany, Georgia, and Florida Normal and Industrial College (now known as Florida Memorial University) of St. Augustine, Florida.

The conference's members were located in Florida, Georgia, and South Carolina.

== Member schools ==
Institution	Location	Founded	Affiliation	Nickname	Joined	Left	Current conference
Albany State College	Albany, Georgia	1903	Public	Golden Rams	1946		Southern (SIAC) (Note: Currently an NCAA Division II athletic conference.)
Allen University	Columbia, South Carolina	1870	AME Church	Yellow Jackets	1940	1947	Southern (SIAC)
Bethune–Cookman College	Daytona Beach, Florida	1904	United Methodist	Wildcats	1941	1950	Southwestern (SWAC) (Note: Currently an NCAA Division I athletic conference.)
Claflin University	Orangeburg, South Carolina	1869	United Methodist	Panthers	1945		CIAA
Edward Waters College	Jacksonville, Florida	1866	AME Church	Tigers	1960		Southern (SIAC)
Florida Normal and Industrial Memorial College	Miami Gardens, Florida	1879	American Baptist	Lions	1946	1958	The Sun (Note: Currently an NAIA athletic conference.)
Fort Valley State College	Fort Valley, Georgia	1939	Public	Wildcats	1940	1947?	Southern (SIAC)
Morris College	Sumter, South Carolina	1908	Baptist	Hornets	1940		Continental
Paine College	Augusta, Georgia	1882	United Methodist	Lions	1940		NCCAA South
Savannah State College	Savannah, Georgia	1890	Public	Tigers	1940		Southern (SIAC)
South Carolina State College	Orangeburg, South Carolina	1896	Public	Bulldogs	1940		Mid-Eastern (MEAC)
Voorhees College	Denmark, South Carolina	1897	Episcopal	Tigers	1965		HBCU

== Football champions ==
- 1940: Allen
- 1941: Allen
- 1942: Allen, Bethune–Cookman, and Georgia State
- 1943: No champion
- 1944: No champion
- 1945: No champion
- 1946: Allen
- 1947: Bethune–Cookman
- 1948: Georgia State
- 1949: Claflin
- 1950: Savannah State
- 1951: Morris
- 1952: Morris
- 1953: Claflin
- 1954: Florida Normal
- 1955: Albany State
- 1956: Savannah State
- 1957: Albany State
- 1958: Claflin
- 1959: Albany State
- 1960: Albany State and Claflin
- 1961: Edward Waters
- 1962: Albany State
- 1963: Morris
- 1964: Edward Waters
- 1965: Edward Waters
- 1966: Albany State

== Yearly football standings ==
1946 Southeastern Athletic Conference football standings
	Conf.					Overall
Team	W		L		T	W		L		T
No. 11 Allen $	5	–	0	–	0	8	–	2	–	0
No. 12 Bethune–Cookman	3	–	1	–	1	7	–	1	–	1
Florida Normal	3	–	1	–	1	6	–	3	–	1
Paine	3	–	2	–	1	?	–	?	–	?
Georgia State	2	–	2	–	1	3	–	2	–	2
Morris	2	–	4	–	0	?	–	?	–	?
Claflin	1	–	4	–	0	1	–	6	–	1
Fort Valley State	0	–	2	–	0	0	–	9	–	0
Albany State	0	–	3	–	0	0	–	7	–	0
$ – Conference champion; Rankings from Pittsburgh Courier Dickinson System

1947 Southeastern Athletic Conference football standings
	Conf.					Overall
Team	W		L		T	W		L		T
Bethune–Cookman $	6	–	0	–	0	10	–	2	–	0
Allen	3	–	0	–	0	6	–	4	–	0
Florida Normal	4	–	1	–	0	7	–	3	–	0
Paine	3	–	3	–	0	3	–	4	–	0
Claflin	2	–	5	–	0	2	–	6	–	0
Albany State	1	–	3	–	1	3	–	4	–	1
Georgia State	1	–	5	–	1	1	–	5	–	1
Morris	1	–	4	–	0	?	–	?	–	?
$ – Conference champion

1952 Southeastern Athletic Conference football standings
	Conf.					Overall
Team	W		L		T	W		L		T
Morris $	5	–	0	–	0	6	–	2	–	0
Albany State	4	–	1	–	0	7	–	3	–	0
Claflin	3	–	2	–	0	4	–	5	–	0
Savannah State	1	–	4	–	0	1	–	8	–	0
Florida Normal	1	–	3	–	0	2	–	4	–	0
Paine	0	–	4	–	0	1	–	5	–	0
$ – Conference champion; Standings were based on Dickinson System ratings.

1953 Southeastern Athletic Conference football standings
	Conf.					Overall
Team	W		L		T	W		L		T
Claflin $	5	–	0	–	0	6	–	3	–	0
Florida Normal	2	–	2	–	0	?	–	?	–	?
Morris	3	–	2	–	0	6	–	3	–	0
Albany State	2	–	2	–	1	2	–	5	–	1
Paine	1	–	2	–	1	?	–	?	–	?
Savannah State	0	–	5	–	0	0	–	8	–	0
$ – Conference champion; Standings were based on Dickinson System ratings.

1956 Southeastern Athletic Conference football standings
	Conf.					Overall
Team	W		L		T	W		L		T
Savannah State $	4	–	1	–	0	4	–	4	–	0
Florida Normal	4	–	1	–	0	5	–	3	–	0
Claflin	3	–	2	–	0	4	–	4	–	0
Albany State	2	–	2	–	1	3	–	3	–	2
Morris	1	–	3	–	1	1	–	7	–	1
Paine	0	–	5	–	0	0	–	6	–	0
$ – Conference champion; Standings were based on Dickinson System ratings.

1959 Southeastern Athletic Conference football standings
	Conf.					Overall
Team	W		L		T	W		L		T
Albany State $	3	–	1	–	0	4	–	5	–	0
Claflin	3	–	1	–	0	6	–	3	–	0
Savannah State	2	–	1	–	1	3	–	4	–	2
Morris	1	–	2	–	1	2	–	6	–	1
Paine	0	–	4	–	0	1	–	6	–	0
$ – Conference champion; Standings were based on Dickinson System ratings.

1960 Southeastern Athletic Conference football standings
	Conf.					Overall
Team	W		L		T	W		L		T
Albany State +	3	–	0	–	1	7	–	0	–	2
Claflin +	3	–	0	–	1	4	–	4	–	1
Savannah State	2	–	2	–	0	3	–	5	–	1
Morris	1	–	3	–	0	2	–	6	–	1
Paine	0	–	4	–	0	1	–	7	–	0
+ – Conference co-champions

1961 Southeastern Athletic Conference football standings
	Conf.					Overall
Team	W		L		T	W		L		T
Edward Waters $	5	–	0	–	0	8	–	1	–	0
Albany State	3	–	2	–	0	6	–	3	–	0
Claflin	3	–	2	–	0	5	–	3	–	1
Savannah State	2	–	2	–	1	4	–	4	–	1
Morris	1	–	3	–	1	3	–	5	–	2
Paine	0	–	5	–	0	0	–	6	–	0
$ – Conference champion

== See also ==
- List of defunct college football conferences
