= Claflin University =

Historically black university in Orangeburg, South Carolina, US

Coordinates: 33°29′54.08″N 80°51′14.53″W

- Former name: Claflin College
- Motto: "The World Needs Visionaries"
- Type: Private historically black liberal arts college
- Established: 1869; 157 years ago
- Religious affiliation: United Methodist Church; UNCF
- Endowment: $72.9 million (2024)
- President: Dwaun J. Warmack
- Students: 1,830
- Location: Orangeburg, South Carolina, United States
- Campus: Urban, 40 acres (16 ha)
- Colors: Orange & Maroon
- Nicknames: Panthers and Lady Panthers
- Sporting affiliations: NCAA Division II, Central Intercollegiate Athletic Association
- Website: claflin.edu

Claflin University is a private historically black liberal arts college in Orangeburg, South Carolina, United States. Founded in 1869 after the American Civil War by northern missionaries for the education of freedmen and their children, it offers bachelor's and master's degrees.

== History ==
It was originally named Claflin College and was founded in 1869 by Alonzo Webster, a minister for the Methodist Episcopal Church (today the United Methodist Church). Claflin College opened its doors on October 27, 1869.

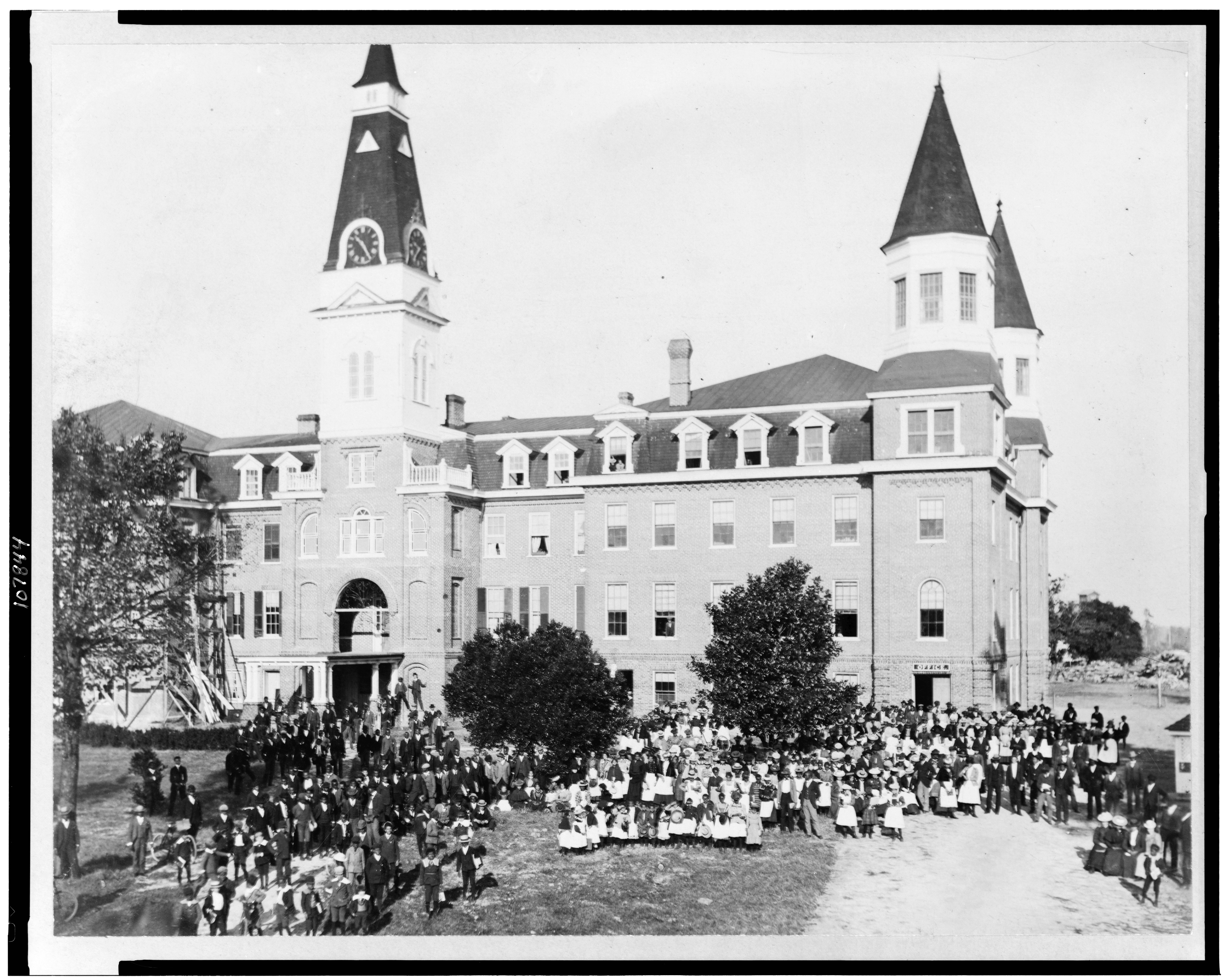
Main building of Claflin University, 1899

Webster came from Vermont to South Carolina as a missionary to teach at the Baker Bible Institute in Charleston, a training school for African American ministers. The Baker Biblical Institute in Charleston, was an institution established by the South Carolina Mission Conference of 1866 of the Methodist Episcopal Church for the education of African American ministers. In 1870, the Baker Biblical Institute merged with Claflin University.

Webster had received a charter from the state of South Carolina to establish a college freed slaves to take their rightful places as full American citizens. Claflin University is the oldest historically black college or university in South Carolina and touts itself as the first college in the state to welcome all students regardless of race or gender. It was the first Black college to offer architectural drawing courses.

The institution was named after two Methodist churchmen: Massachusetts Governor William Claflin and his father, Boston philanthropist Lee Claflin, who provided a large part of the funds to purchase the 43-acre (17 ha) campus. Claflin's first president was Alonzo Webster, who had previously spent time as a member of Claflin's board of trustees. Since the administration of Webster, Claflin has been served by eight presidents.

An act by the South Carolina General Assembly on March 12, 1872, designated the South Carolina State Agricultural and Mechanical Institute as a part of Claflin University. In 1896 the S.C. General Assembly passed an act of separation which severed the State Agricultural and Mechanical Institute from Claflin University and established a separate institution which eventually became South Carolina State University.

In 2020, American novelist and philanthropist MacKenzie Scott donated $20 million to Claflin University. Her donation is the largest single gift in Claflin's history.

=== Presidents ===
Presidents of Claflin have included:

- Alonzo Webster (1869–1872)
- Edward Cooke (1872–1884)
- Lewis M. Dunton (1884–1922)
- Joseph B. Randolph (1922–1944)
- John J. Seabrook (1945–1955)
- Hubert V. Manning (1956–1984)
- Oscar A. Rogers (1984–1994)
- Henry N. Tisdale (1994–2019)
- Dwaun Warmack (2019–present)

== Academics ==
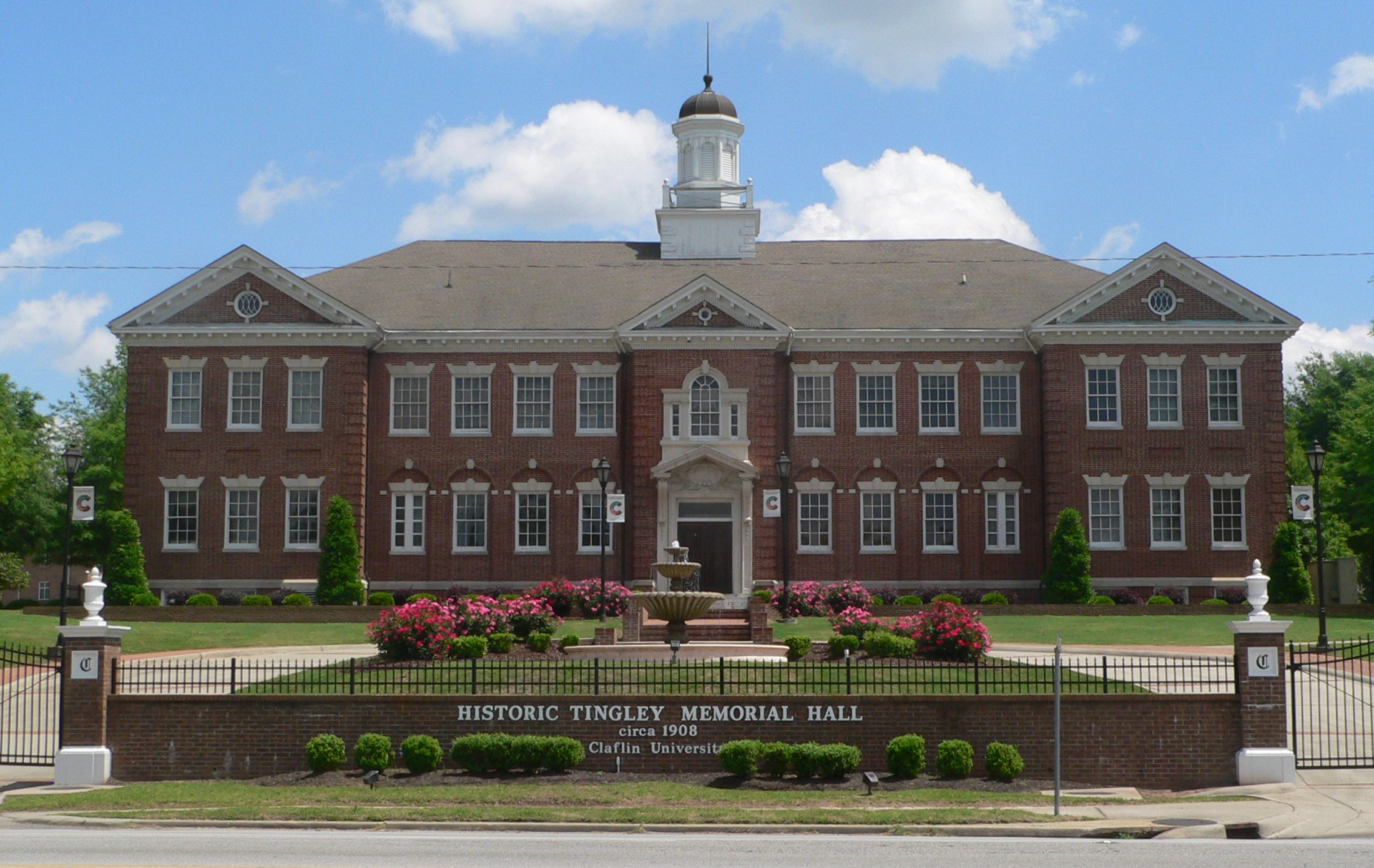
Claflin University's Tingley Hall, designed by alumnus William Wilson Cooke

Claflin offers degrees through four schools:

- School of Natural Sciences and Mathematics
- School of Humanities and Social Sciences
- School of Business
- School of Education

== Student life ==
=== Athletics ===
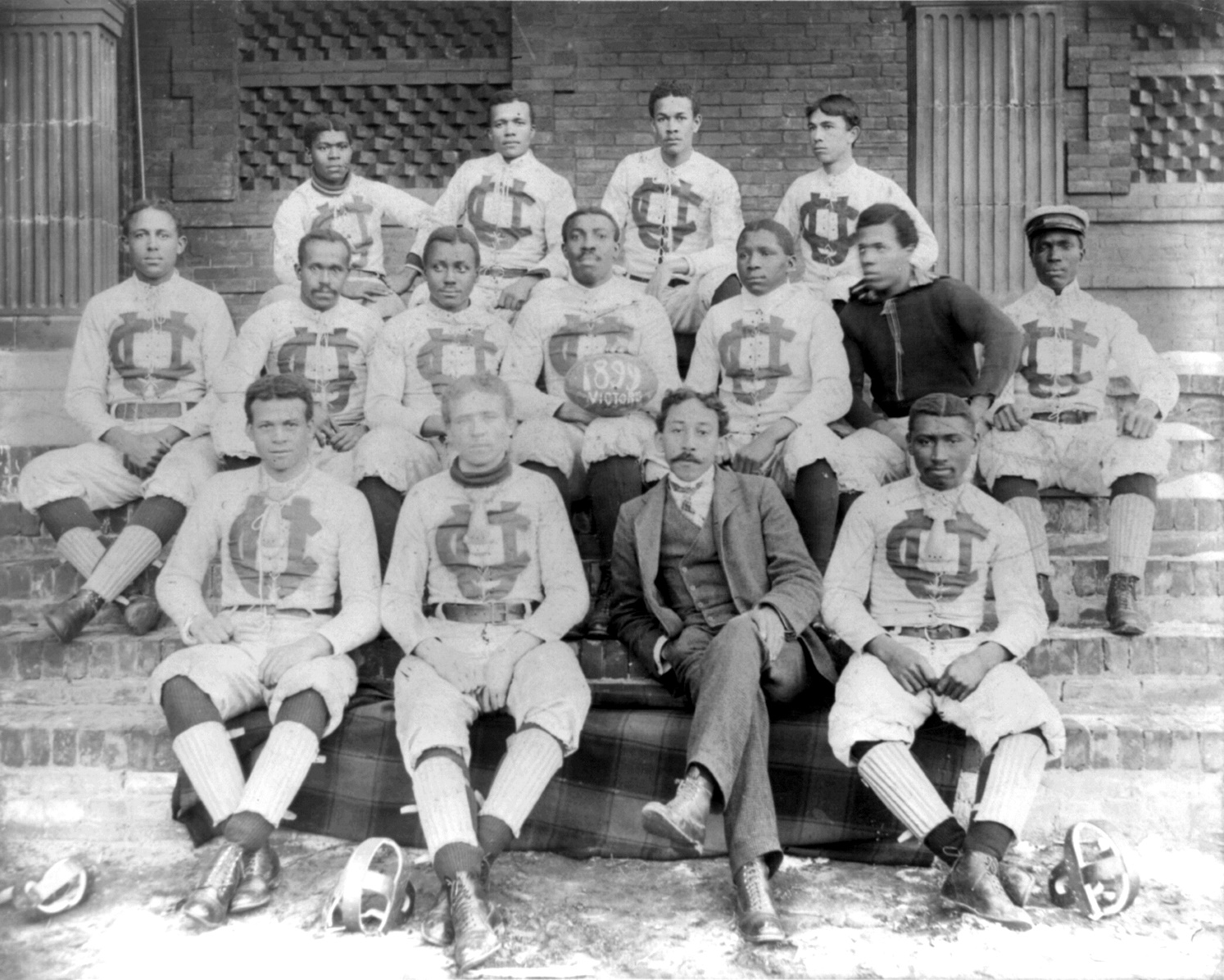
Claflin football team of 1899

Claflin University's athletics teams are referred to as the Panthers. The institution is a member of the Division II level of the National Collegiate Athletic Association (NCAA), primarily competing in the Central Intercollegiate Athletic Association (CIAA) since the 2018–19 academic year. The Panthers have also competed in the Southern Intercollegiate Athletic Conference (SIAC) from 2008–09 to 2017–18; as well as in the defunct Eastern Intercollegiate Athletic Conference (EIAC) from 1983–84 to 2004–05.

Claflin competes in ten intercollegiate varsity sports: Men's basketball, baseball, cross country and track & field, and women's basketball, cheerleading, cross country, softball, track & field and volleyball.

Claflin has an all-girl cheerleading team that serves as athletics support and ambassadors of the institution as well as their pep band.

=== Student organizations ===
There are over 50 student organizations on campus, including several honor societies and chapters for eight of the nine National Pan-Hellenic Council organizations.

== Notable alumni ==
Name	Class year	Notability	Reference(s)
Robert Charles Bates	MA 1888	He taught at Claflin University from 1890 to 1897, and designed Fisk Hall (destroyed), T. Willard Lewis Chapel, and other campus buildings.	
Gloria Rackley Blackwell	1953	Civil rights activist, professor at Clark Atlanta University.	
William Wilson Cooke	1893, 1902	Architect, designed Lee Library (1898) and Tingley Memorial Hall. He went to Washington, D.C., to become the first black architect in the Office of the Supervising Architect for the U.S. Treasury, and planned and administered federal buildings.	
Joseph H. Jefferson	1970	Member of the South Carolina House of Representatives, representing the 102nd District.	
E. Roger Mitchell	1993	Actor in The Walking Dead and The Hunger Games: Catching Fire.	
Ernest Newman	1948	First African-American bishop of the Tennessee Conference of the United Methodist Church.	
Arthur Rose Sr.	1950	Chair of Art Department (1952-1973) at Claflin University; the Arthur Rose Museum at the university was named for him	
James S. Thomas	1939	First African-American bishop of the Iowa Conference of the United Methodist Church	
Henry N. Tisdale	B.S. 1965	Eighth president of Claflin University. First African-American to earn a PhD. In mathematics at Dartmouth College.	
Leo Twiggs	1956	Artist and educator at South Carolina State University; the first African American to receive a doctorate of Arts from the University of Georgia.	
Cecil J. Williams	1960	American photographer, founder of the Cecil Williams Civil Rights Museum, publisher, author and inventor best known for his photography documenting the civil rights movement in South Carolina.	
Bryan Andrew Wilson	2004	Gospel artist	
