= List of Central Intercollegiate Athletic Association football standings =

This is a list of yearly Central Intercollegiate Athletic Association football standings.

== CIAA standings ==
=== Early years ===
1923 Colored Intercollegiate Athletic Association football standings
	Conf.					Overall
Team	W		L		T	W		L		T
Virginia Union $	5	–	0	–	0	6	–	0	–	1
Howard	3	–	0	–	1	7	–	0	–	1
Hampton	4	–	2	–	0	5	–	2	–	0
Virginia Normal	3	–	3	–	0	4	–	3	–	0
Lincoln (PA)	1	–	1	–	2	5	–	1	–	2
Saint Paul (VA)	2	–	3	–	1	6	–	3	–	1
Virginia Seminary	1	–	4	–	0	3	–	6	–	0
Shaw	0	–	5	–	0	0	–	5	–	0
$ – Conference champion

1947 Colored Intercollegiate Athletic Association football standings
	Conf.					Overall
Team	W		L		T	W		L		T
No. 5 Shaw $	6	–	0	–	0	10	–	0	–	0
No. 7 Virginia State	7	–	1	–	0	9	–	1	–	0
No. 4 Hampton	5	–	1	–	1	7	–	2	–	1
No. 11 Howard	6	–	2	–	1	6	–	2	–	1
No. 9 Morgan State	5	–	2	–	1	5	–	2	–	1
No. 14 West Virginia State	4	–	1	–	1	6	–	3	–	1
No. 19 Lincoln (PA)	3	–	3	–	1	5	–	4	–	1
Delaware State	4	–	3	–	0	4	–	4	–	0
Virginia Union	3	–	5	–	0	4	–	5	–	0
Winston-Salem State	3	–	3	–	0	6	–	3	–	0
North Carolina A&T	1	–	5	–	1	1	–	5	–	1
North Carolina College	2	–	6	–	0	2	–	7	–	0
Bluefield State	1	–	5	–	0	3	–	6	–	0
Saint Paul's (VA)	0	–	5	–	1	0	–	5	–	1
Johnson C. Smith	0	–	2	–	1	1	–	5	–	1
$ – Conference champion; Rankings from the Pittsburgh Courier using the Dickinson Ratings System.

1934 Colored Intercollegiate Athletic Association football standings
	Conf.					Overall
Team	W		L		T	W		L		T
Morgan $	4	–	0	–	3	5	–	0	–	3
Bluefield State	7	–	0	–	1	8	–	0	–	1
North Carolina A&T	7	–	1	–	0	7	–	1	–	0
Virginia Union	4	–	2	–	2	4	–	2	–	2
Virginia State	4	–	3	–	1	4	–	4	–	1
Hampton	3	–	5	–	0	3	–	5	–	0
North Carolina College	4	–	4	–	0	4	–	4	–	0
Saint Paul's (VA)	3	–	5	–	0	3	–	5	–	0
St. Augustine's	1	–	2	–	1	3	–	2	–	1
Howard	3	–	1	–	2	4	–	2	–	2
Shaw	1	–	6	–	0	1	–	6	–	1
Johnson C. Smith	1	–	2	–	1	1	–	2	–	1
Lincoln (PA)	0	–	5	–	0	1	–	6	–	0
$ – Conference champion

1955 Central Intercollegiate Athletic Association football standings
	Conf.					Overall
Team	W		L		T	W		L		T
No. 2 Maryland State $	7	–	0	–	0	9	–	0	–	0
No. 12 Delaware State	5	–	1	–	0	7	–	1	–	0
No. 13 Morgan State	5	–	1	–	0	6	–	2	–	0
Winston-Salem State	5	–	1	–	0	6	–	2	–	0
No. 7 North Carolina A&T	4	–	1	–	2	4	–	1	–	3
No. 14 Virginia State	4	–	1	–	3	4	–	2	–	3
No. 9 North Carolina College	3	–	1	–	2	4	–	1	–	2
Shaw	4	–	2	–	2	4	–	3	–	2
Bluefield State	5	–	2	–	1	7	–	2	–	1
St. Augustine's	3	–	5	–	0	4	–	5	–	0
Hampton	4	–	6	–	0	4	–	6	–	0
Howard	2	–	4	–	0	3	–	6	–	0
Johnson C. Smith	2	–	4	–	0	3	–	4	–	0
Virginia Union	3	–	5	–	0	4	–	5	–	0
Saint Paul's (VA)	1	–	5	–	0	2	–	6	–	0
Lincoln (PA)	1	–	6	–	0	1	–	7	–	0
West Virginia State	0	–	6	–	0	1	–	7	–	0
Fayetteville State	0	–	8	–	0	0	–	9	–	0
$ – Conference champion; Rankings from the Pittsburgh Courier.

1936 Colored Intercollegiate Athletic Association football standings
	Conf.					Overall
Team	W		L		T	W		L		T
Virginia State $	7	–	0	–	2	9	–	0	–	2
Morgan	5	–	0	–	2	6	–	0	–	2
Bluefield State	3	–	0	–	3	3	–	2	–	4
Hampton	5	–	2	–	0	5	–	2	–	1
North Carolina College	3	–	3	–	1	4	–	3	–	1
North Carolina A&T	4	–	4	–	0	5	–	4	–	0
Shaw	3	–	3	–	0	3	–	3	–	0
Johnson C. Smith	1	–	2	–	1	2	–	3	–	3
Saint Paul's (VA)	2	–	5	–	1	2	–	5	–	1
Virginia Union	2	–	5	–	1	2	–	5	–	1
Lincoln (PA)	1	–	4	–	0	1	–	4	–	0
St. Augustine's	0	–	4	–	0	0	–	4	–	0
Howard	0	–	4	–	0	0	–	5	–	0
$ – Conference champion

=== NCAA Division II (2004–present) ===
2004 Central Intercollegiate Athletic Association football standings
	Conf.			Overall
Team	W		L	W		L
Eastern Division
Shaw # xy$	5	–	2	10	–	2
Bowie State	4	–	3	5	–	5
Virginia State	3	–	4	6	–	4
Virginia Union	2	–	5	2	–	8
Elizabeth City State	2	–	5	3	–	7
Western Division
Fayetteville State xy^	6	–	1	8	–	4
North Carolina Central x	6	–	1	8	–	2
Winston-Salem State	4	–	3	4	–	6
Livingstone	2	–	5	2	–	8
St. Augustine's @	0	–	4	0	–	6
Johnson C. Smith	0	–	7	0	–	10
Championship: Shaw 10, Fayetteville State 7
$ – Conference champion; x – Division champion/co-champions; y – Championship game participant; ^ – NCAA Division II playoff participant; # – Pioneer Bowl participant @ – St. Augustine's vacated 4 wins including 3 in conference play.

2005 Central Intercollegiate Athletic Association football standings
	Conf.			Overall
Team	W		L	W		L
Eastern Division
Bowie State # xy	5	–	2	8	–	4
Virginia State x	5	–	2	6	–	4
Shaw	4	–	3	5	–	5
Saint Paul's	3	–	4	4	–	6
Virginia Union	2	–	5	3	–	7
Elizabeth City State	1	–	6	2	–	8
Western Division
No. 19 North Carolina Central xy$^	6	–	1	10	–	2
Winston-Salem State x	6	–	1	6	–	4
Fayetteville State	4	–	3	6	–	4
Livingstone	1	–	6	1	–	9
Johnson C. Smith	0	–	7	0	–	10
St. Augustine's *	0	–	2	0	–	2
Championship: North Carolina Central 26, Bowie State 23
$ – Conference champion; x – Division champion/co-champions; y – Championship game participant; ^ – NCAA Division II playoff participant; # – Pioneer Bowl participant * – St. Augustine's vacated 8 wins including 5 in conference play; Rankings from AFCA poll

2006 Central Intercollegiate Athletic Association football standings
	Conf.			Overall
Team	W		L	W		L
Eastern Division
No. 21 Elizabeth City State xy^	7	–	0	9	–	3
Virginia Union	5	–	2	7	–	3
Bowie State	3	–	4	5	–	5
Shaw	2	–	5	3	–	7
Virginia State	2	–	5	2	–	8
Saint Paul's	1	–	6	2	–	8
Western Division
No. 9 North Carolina Central xy$^	7	–	0	11	–	1
Johnson C. Smith #	4	–	3	7	–	4
St. Augustine's †	4	–	3	4	–	6
Fayetteville State	2	–	5	3	–	7
Livingstone	1	–	6	1	–	9
Championship: North Carolina Central 17, Elizabeth City State 14
$ – Conference champion; x – Division champion/co-champions; y – Championship game participant; ^ – NCAA Division II playoff participant; # – Pioneer Bowl participant † – St. Augustine's vacated all four wins; Rankings from AFCA poll

2007 Central Intercollegiate Athletic Association football standings
	Conf.			Overall
Team	W		L	W		L
Eastern Division
Virginia Union # xy	6	–	1	9	–	3
Elizabeth City State	5	–	2	5	–	5
Saint Paul's	4	–	3	5	–	5
Virginia State	3	–	4	4	–	6
Bowie State	3	–	4	3	–	7
Western Division
Shaw xy$^	6	–	1	8	–	4
Fayetteville State	4	–	3	4	–	6
Johnson C. Smith	2	–	5	3	–	7
St. Augustine's †	2	–	5	2	–	8
Livingstone	0	–	7	0	–	10
Championship: Shaw 31, Virginia Union 24 ^{2OT}
$ – Conference champion; x – Division champion/co-champions; y – Championship game participant; ^ – NCAA Division II playoff participant; # – Pioneer Bowl participant † – St. Augustine's vacated both wins

2008 Central Intercollegiate Athletic Association football standings
	Conf.			Overall
Team	W		L	W		L
Eastern Division
Elizabeth City State xy	7	–	0	7	–	4
Bowie State	4	–	3	5	–	4
Virginia State	4	–	3	5	–	5
Saint Paul's	3	–	4	5	–	5
Virginia Union	3	–	4	5	–	5
Western Division
Shaw xy$	6	–	1	8	–	3
Fayetteville State x	6	–	1	8	–	2
St. Augustine's	3	–	4	4	–	6
Johnson C. Smith	2	–	5	3	–	7
Livingstone	2	–	5	2	–	8
Chowan	1	–	6	2	–	8
Championship: Shaw 36, Elizabeth City State 7
$ – Conference champion; x – Division champion/co-champions; y – Championship game participant; Lincoln (PA) played a full CIAA schedule as a provisional Division II member.

2009 Central Intercollegiate Athletic Association football standings
	Conf.			Overall
Team	W		L	W		L
Eastern Division
Bowie State xy	5	–	2	6	–	5
Elizabeth City State # x	5	–	2	7	–	4
Virginia Union x	5	–	2	6	–	4
Virginia State	4	–	3	6	–	4
Saint Paul's	3	–	4	4	–	5
Western Division
Fayetteville State xy$^	6	–	1	8	–	4
Shaw	5	–	2	8	–	2
St. Augustine's	4	–	3	4	–	6
Johnson C. Smith	2	–	5	3	–	7
Chowan	2	–	5	2	–	8
Livingstone	0	–	7	0	–	10
Championship: Fayetteville State 21, Bowie State 10
$ – Conference champion; x – Division champion/co-champions; y – Championship game participant; ^ – NCAA Division II playoff participant; # – Pioneer Bowl participant Lincoln (PA) played a full CIAA schedule as a provisional Division II member.

2010 Central Intercollegiate Athletic Association football standings
	Conf.			Overall
Team	W		L	W		L
Northern Division
Virginia State xy	6	–	1	8	–	3
Bowie State x	6	–	1	6	–	4
Elizabeth City State	5	–	2	6	–	4
Chowan	3	–	4	3	–	7
Virginia Union	3	–	4	3	–	7
Saint Paul's	2	–	5	2	–	8
Lincoln (PA)	0	–	7	1	–	9
Southern Division
Shaw xy$^	7	–	0	9	–	3
St. Augustine's #	6	–	1	9	–	2
Winston-Salem State	5	–	2	8	–	2
Fayetteville State	4	–	3	5	–	5
Johnson C. Smith	1	–	6	2	–	8
Livingstone	0	–	7	0	–	11
Championship: Shaw 14, Virginia State 7
$ – Conference champion; x – Division champion/co-champions; y – Championship game participant; ^ – NCAA Division II playoff participant; # – Pioneer Bowl participant

2011 Central Intercollegiate Athletic Association football standings
	Conf.			Overall
Team	W		L	W		L
Northern Division
Elizabeth City State xy^	6	–	1	8	–	4
Virginia State	4	–	3	5	–	5
Virginia Union	3	–	4	5	–	5
Bowie State	3	–	4	4	–	6
Chowan	2	–	5	3	–	7
Lincoln (PA)	2	–	5	2	–	8
Southern Division
No. 3 Winston-Salem State xy$^	7	–	0	13	–	1
Johnson C. Smith #	4	–	3	6	–	5
Fayetteville State	4	–	3	4	–	6
St. Augustine's	3	–	4	4	–	6
Shaw	3	–	4	3	–	7
Livingstone	0	–	7	1	–	9
Championship: Winston–Salem State 38, Elizabeth City State
$ – Conference champion; x – Division champion/co-champions; y – Championship game participant; ^ – NCAA Division II playoff participant; # – Pioneer Bowl participant; Rankings from AFCA poll

2012 Central Intercollegiate Athletic Association football standings
	Conf.			Overall
Team	W		L	W		L
Northern Division
Elizabeth City State # xy	6	–	1	8	–	4
Chowan	5	–	2	6	–	4
Virginia Union	3	–	4	5	–	5
Virginia State	3	–	4	4	–	6
Bowie State	2	–	5	5	–	5
Lincoln (PA)	1	–	6	1	–	9
Southern Division
No. 2 Winston-Salem State xy$^	7	–	0	14	–	1
Johnson C. Smith	5	–	2	6	–	4
St. Augustine's	4	–	3	6	–	4
Shaw	3	–	4	4	–	6
Livingstone	2	–	5	2	–	8
Fayetteville State	1	–	6	2	–	8
Championship: Winston-Salem State 34, Elizabeth City State 19
$ – Conference champion; x – Division champion/co-champions; y – Championship game participant; ^ – NCAA Division II playoff participant; # – Pioneer Bowl participant; Rankings from AFCA poll

2013 Central Intercollegiate Athletic Association football standings
	Conf.			Overall
Team	W		L	W		L
Northern Division
Virginia State x	7	–	0	9	–	1
Elizabeth City State	4	–	3	4	–	6
Bowie State	3	–	4	5	–	5
Chowan	3	–	4	4	–	6
Virginia Union	3	–	4	3	–	7
Lincoln (PA)	0	–	7	1	–	9
Southern Division
No. 14 Winston-Salem State x$^	7	–	0	10	–	2
Fayetteville State	5	–	2	6	–	4
Shaw	4	–	3	6	–	4
St. Augustine's	4	–	3	6	–	4
Johnson C. Smith	3	–	4	4	–	6
Livingstone	1	–	6	3	–	7
Championship: Winston-Salem State 1, Virginia State 0 (forfeit)
$ – Conference champion; x – Division champion/co-champions; y – Championship game participant; ^ – NCAA Division II playoff participant; As a result of an attack by Virginia State players on a Winston-Salem State player during a CIAA luncheon before the conference championship game, the conference ruled Virginia State ineligible for postseason and awarded Winston-Salem State the conference championship.; Rankings from AFCA poll

2014 Central Intercollegiate Athletic Association football standings
	Conf.			Overall
Team	W		L	W		L
Northern Division
No. 22 Virginia State xy$^	7	–	0	10	–	3
Virginia Union	5	–	2	7	–	3
Bowie State	5	–	2	5	–	5
Elizabeth City State	3	–	4	4	–	6
Chowan	1	–	6	2	–	8
Lincoln (PA)	0	–	7	1	–	9
Southern Division
No. 24 Winston-Salem State xy	7	–	0	9	–	2
Fayetteville State	5	–	2	5	–	5
St. Augustine's	3	–	4	3	–	7
Livingstone	2	–	5	5	–	5
Johnson C. Smith	2	–	5	3	–	7
Shaw Bears football	2	–	5	3	–	7
Championship: Virginia State 21, Winston–Salem State 17
$ – Conference champion; x – Division champion/co-champions; y – Championship game participant; ^ – NCAA Division II playoff participant; Rankings from AFCA poll

2015 Central Intercollegiate Athletic Association football standings
	Conf.			Overall
Team	W		L	W		L
Northern Division
Bowie State xy^	7	–	0	9	–	3
Virginia Union ^	6	–	1	8	–	2
Chowan	4	–	3	6	–	4
Virginia State	4	–	3	6	–	4
Elizabeth City State	2	–	5	4	–	5
Lincoln (PA)	1	–	6	3	–	7
Southern Division
Winston-Salem State xy$	5	–	2	6	–	5
Livingstone	4	–	3	5	–	3
Johnson C. Smith	3	–	4	4	–	6
Fayetteville State	4	–	3	4	–	6
Shaw	1	–	6	1	–	9
St. Augustine's	1	–	6	1	–	9
Championship: Winston–Salem St. 17, Bowie St. 14
$ – Conference champion; x – Division champion/co-champions; y – Championship game participant; ^ – NCAA Division II playoff participant

2016 Central Intercollegiate Athletic Association football standings
	Conf.			Overall
Team	W		L	W		L
Northern Division
Bowie State xy	6	–	1	7	–	4
Virginia State	5	–	2	8	–	2
Elizabeth City State	4	–	3	5	–	5
Virginia Union	4	–	3	5	–	5
Chowan	4	–	3	6	–	4
Lincoln (PA)	0	–	7	1	–	9
Southern Division
Winston-Salem State xy$^	7	–	0	9	–	3
Fayetteville State	4	–	3	4	–	6
Johnson C. Smith	3	–	4	3	–	7
Shaw	2	–	5	2	–	8
St. Augustine's	2	–	5	2	–	8
Livingstone	1	–	6	2	–	8
Championship: Winston–Salem St. 43, Bowie St. 33
$ – Conference champion; x – Division champion/co-champions; y – Championship game participant; ^ – NCAA Division II playoff participant

2017 Central Intercollegiate Athletic Association football standings
	Conf.			Overall
Team	W		L	W		L
Northern Division
No. 18 Virginia State xy$^	7	–	0	10	–	1
No. 23 Bowie State ^	6	–	1	9	–	2
Virginia Union	5	–	2	6	–	4
Chowan	4	–	3	4	–	6
Elizabeth City State	2	–	5	4	–	6
Lincoln (PA)	0	–	7	0	–	10
Southern Division
Fayetteville State xy	5	–	2	6	–	5
St. Augustine's x	5	–	2	5	–	5
Winston-Salem State	4	–	3	6	–	4
Shaw	2	–	5	3	–	7
Johnson C. Smith	2	–	5	2	–	8
Livingstone	0	–	7	0	–	10
Championship: Virginia St. 42, Fayetteville St. 19
$ – Conference champion; x – Division champion/co-champions; y – Championship game participant; ^ – NCAA Division II playoff participant; Rankings from AFCA poll

2018 Central Intercollegiate Athletic Association football standings
	Conf.			Overall
Team	W		L	W		L
Northern Division
No. 19 Bowie State xy$^	5	–	1	10	–	3
Virginia Union x	5	–	1	8	–	2
Chowan	4	–	2	6	–	4
Virginia State	3	–	3	4	–	5
Lincoln (PA)	1	–	5	1	–	9
Elizabeth City State	0	–	6	1	–	7
Southern Division
Fayetteville State xy	5	–	1	6	–	3
Shaw	4	–	2	5	–	5
Winston-Salem State	4	–	2	5	–	4
Johnson C. Smith Golden Bulls football	2	–	4	3	–	8
St. Augustine's	2	–	4	2	–	7
Livingstone	1	–	5	3	–	6
Championship: Bowie State 30, Fayetteville State 10
$ – Conference champion; x – Division champion/co-champions; y – Championship game participant; ^ – NCAA Division II playoff participant; Rankings from AFCA poll

2019 Central Intercollegiate Athletic Association football standings
	Conf.			Overall
Team	W		L	W		L
Northern Division
No. 18 Bowie State xy$^	7	–	0	11	–	1
Virginia State	6	–	1	8	–	2
Virginia Union	5	–	2	7	–	3
Chowan	2	–	5	3	–	7
Elizabeth City State	2	–	5	2	–	9
Lincoln (PA)	0	–	7	0	–	10
Southern Division
Fayetteville State xy	6	–	1	8	–	3
Shaw	5	–	2	6	–	4
Johnson C. Smith	3	–	4	4	–	6
Winston–Salem State	3	–	4	4	–	6
St. Augustine's	2	–	5	2	–	8
Livingstone	1	–	6	4	–	6
Championship: Bowie State 23, Fayetteville State 7
$ – Conference champion; x – Division champion/co-champions; y – Championship game participant; ^ – NCAA Division II playoff participant; Rankings from AFCA poll
