= 1953 Shaw Bears football team =

American college football season

1953 Shaw Bears football
- Conference: Central Intercollegiate Athletic Association
- Record: 2–7 (2–4 CIAA)
- Head coach: Howard K. Wilson (7th season)
- Captain: Pete Hawkins
- Home stadium: Chavis Park

1953 Central Intercollegiate Athletic Association football standings
	Conf.					Overall
Team	W		L		T	W		L		T
No. 7 North Carolina College $	5	–	1	–	0	5	–	3	–	0
No. 9 Morgan State	5	–	1	–	0	6	–	2	–	0
North Carolina A&T	5	–	1	–	0	7	–	1	–	1
Johnson C. Smith	5	–	2	–	0	5	–	3	–	0
No. 8 Virginia State	5	–	2	–	1	5	–	3	–	1
No. 11 West Virginia State	4	–	2	–	0	6	–	3	–	0
Hampton	5	–	3	–	0	6	–	3	–	1
Howard	3	–	5	–	0	3	–	5	–	1
Shaw	2	–	4	–	0	2	–	7	–	0
St. Augustine's	2	–	4	–	0	3	–	4	–	1
Virginia Union	2	–	4	–	1	5	–	4	–	1
Lincoln (PA)	2	–	4	–	0	3	–	5	–	0
Winston-Salem State	2	–	4	–	0	3	–	5	–	1
Delaware State	2	–	4	–	0	4	–	4	–	0
Bluefield State	2	–	5	–	0	2	–	7	–	0
Saint Paul's (VA)	1	–	4	–	0	1	–	6	–	0
$ – Conference champion; Rankings from Pittsburgh Courier

The 1953 Shaw Bears football team was an American football team that represented Shaw University as a member of the Central Intercollegiate Athletic Association (CIAA) during the 1953 college football season. Led by Howard K. Wilson in his seventh and final year as head coach, Shaw returned to competition after not fielding a football team in 1952. The team's captain was Pete Hawkins, who played center, and the co-captain was Wilson Chambers. Playing their home games at Chavis Park in Raleigh, North Carolina, the Bears finished the season with an overall record of 2–7 and a conference mark of 2–4. Their first win of the season, over Bluefield State on November 7, snapped a 13-game losing streak dating back to the 1951 season.

== Schedule ==
Date	Time	Opponent	Site	Result	Attendance	Source
October 3	2:00 p.m.	St. Augustine's	Chavis Park; Raleigh, NC	L 0–6		
October 10		at Virginia State	Rogers Stadium; Petersburg, VA	L 0–41		
October 17		North Carolina A&T	Chavis Park; Raleigh, NC	L 0–40		
October 24		Allen*^{†}	Chavis Park; Raleigh, NC	L 6–20		
October 31		at Maryland State*	Princess Anne, MD	L 6–26	1,500	
November 7		Bluefield State	Chavis Park; Raleigh, NC	W 13–6		
November 14		Lincoln (PA)	Chavis Park; Raleigh, NC	L 0–33		
November 21		at Johnson C. Smith	Charlotte, NC	W 13–2		
November 27		vs. Bethune–Cookman*	Tampa, FL	L 6–20	6,500	
*Non-conference game; ^{†}Homecoming; All times are in Eastern time
