= 1953 Delaware State Hornets football team =

American college football season

1953 Delaware State Hornets football
- Conference: Central Intercollegiate Athletic Association
- Record: 4–4 (2–4 CIAA)
- Head coach: Edward L. Jackson (5th season)

1953 Central Intercollegiate Athletic Association football standings
| | Conf. | | | | | Overall |
| Team | W | | L | | T | W | | L | | T |
|---|---|---|---|---|---|---|---|---|---|---|
| No. 7 North Carolina College $ | 5 | – | 1 | – | 0 | 5 | – | 3 | – | 0 |
| No. 9 Morgan State | 5 | – | 1 | – | 0 | 6 | – | 2 | – | 0 |
| North Carolina A&T | 5 | – | 1 | – | 0 | 7 | – | 1 | – | 1 |
| Johnson C. Smith | 5 | – | 2 | – | 0 | 5 | – | 3 | – | 0 |
| No. 8 Virginia State | 5 | – | 2 | – | 1 | 5 | – | 3 | – | 1 |
| No. 11 West Virginia State | 4 | – | 2 | – | 0 | 6 | – | 3 | – | 0 |
| Hampton | 5 | – | 3 | – | 0 | 6 | – | 3 | – | 1 |
| Howard | 3 | – | 5 | – | 0 | 3 | – | 5 | – | 1 |
| Shaw | 2 | – | 4 | – | 0 | 2 | – | 7 | – | 0 |
| St. Augustine's | 2 | – | 4 | – | 0 | 3 | – | 4 | – | 1 |
| Virginia Union | 2 | – | 4 | – | 1 | 5 | – | 4 | – | 1 |
| Lincoln (PA) | 2 | – | 4 | – | 0 | 3 | – | 5 | – | 0 |
| Winston-Salem State | 2 | – | 4 | – | 0 | 3 | – | 5 | – | 1 |
| Delaware State | 2 | – | 4 | – | 0 | 4 | – | 4 | – | 0 |
| Bluefield State | 2 | – | 5 | – | 0 | 2 | – | 7 | – | 0 |
| Saint Paul's (VA) | 1 | – | 4 | – | 0 | 1 | – | 6 | – | 0 |
$ – Conference champion; Rankings from Pittsburgh Courier

The 1953 Delaware State Hornets football team represented Delaware State College—now known as Delaware State University—as a member of the Central Intercollegiate Athletic Association (CIAA) in the 1953 college football season. 1930s coach Edward L. Jackson returned, bringing the team back from a 1–7 record in 1952, to a 4–4 record in 1953. In the last game of the season, members the 1934 championship team, who Jackson coached, watched the Hornets win, 19–12.

== Schedule ==
| Date | Opponent | Site | Result | Source |
|---|---|---|---|---|
| September 26 | Cheyney* | Dover, DE | W 7–6 | |
| October 3 | Norfolk State* | Dover, DE | W 18–0 | |
| October 10 | at Hampton | Armstrong Stadium; Hampton, VA | L 0–26 | |
| October 17 | at Johnson C. Smith | Charlotte, NC | L 0–20 | |
| October 24 | Lincoln (PA) | Dover, DE | L 12–19 | |
| October 31 | at Saint Paul's (VA) | Lawrenceville, VA | L 6–7 | |
| November 14 | at Howard | Washington, DC | W 13–6 | |
| November 21 | St. Augustine's | Dover, DE | W 19–12 | |
*Non-conference game
