= 1955 Maryland State Hawks football team =

American college football season

1955 Maryland State Hawks football

CIAA champion
- Conference: Central Intercollegiate Athletic Association
- Record: 9–0 (7–0 CIAA)
- Head coach: Vernon McCain (8th season)

1955 Central Intercollegiate Athletic Association football standings
	Conf.					Overall
Team	W		L		T	W		L		T
No. 2 Maryland State $	7	–	0	–	0	9	–	0	–	0
No. 12 Delaware State	5	–	1	–	0	7	–	1	–	0
No. 13 Morgan State	5	–	1	–	0	6	–	2	–	0
Winston-Salem State	5	–	1	–	0	6	–	2	–	0
No. 7 North Carolina A&T	4	–	1	–	2	4	–	1	–	3
No. 14 Virginia State	4	–	1	–	3	4	–	2	–	3
No. 9 North Carolina College	3	–	1	–	2	4	–	1	–	2
Shaw	4	–	2	–	2	4	–	3	–	2
Bluefield State	5	–	2	–	1	7	–	2	–	1
St. Augustine's	3	–	5	–	0	4	–	5	–	0
Hampton	4	–	6	–	0	4	–	6	–	0
Howard	2	–	4	–	0	3	–	6	–	0
Johnson C. Smith	2	–	4	–	0	3	–	4	–	0
Virginia Union	3	–	5	–	0	4	–	5	–	0
Saint Paul's (VA)	1	–	5	–	0	2	–	6	–	0
Lincoln (PA)	1	–	6	–	0	1	–	7	–	0
West Virginia State	0	–	6	–	0	1	–	7	–	0
Fayetteville State	0	–	8	–	0	0	–	9	–	0
$ – Conference champion; Rankings from the Pittsburgh Courier.

The 1955 Maryland State Hawks football team was an American football team that represented Maryland State College (now known as University of Maryland Eastern Shore) in the Central Intercollegiate Athletic Association (CIAA) during the 1955 college football season. In their eighth season under head coach Vernon McCain, the team compiled a 9–0 record (7–0 against conference opponents), won the CIAA championship, and shut out seven of nine opponents.

At the end of the season, the team was ranked No. 2 among the nation's black college football teams by the Pittsburgh Courier. Maryland State earned a 23.55 rating, three points behind No. 1 Grambling (26.42) because Grambling had played a tenth game.

Key players included sophomore back Johnny Sample who went on to play 11 seasons in the National Football League and American Football League.

== Schedule ==
Date	Opponent	Site	Result	Attendance	Source
September 17	at Virginia Union	Norfolk, VA	W 20–0		
September 23	at Hofstra*	Hempstead, NY	W 19–13		
October 1	at Hampton	Hampton, VA	W 6–0		
October 8	Fayetteville State	Princess Anne, MD	W 44–6		
October 15	at North Carolina A&T	Memorial Stadium; Greensboro, NC	W 6–0	12,000	
October 22	North Carolina College^{†}	Princess Anne, MD	W 6–0	4,000	
October 29	Wilkes*	Princess Anne, MD	W 45–0		
November 5	at Delaware State	Dover, DE	W 3–0		
November 19	Shaw	Princess Anne, MD	W 17–0		
*Non-conference game; ^{†}Homecoming

== After the season ==
The 1956 NFL Draft was held on January 17–18, 1956. The following Hawks were selected.

Round	Pick	Player	Position	NFL Club
6	71	Sherman Plunkett	End	Cleveland Browns
20	233	Darrell Glover	Tackle	Philadelphia Eagles
