= 1947 Shaw Bears football team =

American college football season

1947 Shaw Bears football

Black college national co-champion CIAA champion National Bowl champion

National Bowl, W 8–0 vs. South Carolina State
- Conference: Colored Intercollegiate Athletic Association
- Record: 10–0 (6–0 CIAA)
- Head coach: Howard K. Wilson (2nd season)
- Home stadium: Chavis Park

1947 Colored Intercollegiate Athletic Association football standings
	Conf.					Overall
Team	W		L		T	W		L		T
No. 5 Shaw $	6	–	0	–	0	10	–	0	–	0
No. 7 Virginia State	7	–	1	–	0	8	–	1	–	0
No. 4 Hampton	5	–	1	–	1	7	–	2	–	1
No. 11 Howard	6	–	2	–	1	6	–	2	–	1
No. 9 Morgan State	5	–	2	–	1	5	–	2	–	1
No. 14 West Virginia State	4	–	1	–	1	6	–	3	–	1
No. 19 Lincoln (PA)	3	–	3	–	1	5	–	4	–	1
Delaware State	4	–	3	–	0	4	–	4	–	0
Virginia Union	3	–	5	–	0	4	–	5	–	0
Winston-Salem State	3	–	3	–	0	6	–	3	–	0
North Carolina A&T	1	–	5	–	1	1	–	5	–	1
North Carolina College	2	–	6	–	0	2	–	7	–	0
Bluefield State	1	–	5	–	0	3	–	6	–	0
Johnson C. Smith	1	–	7	–	0	1	–	8	–	0
Saint Paul's (VA)	0	–	5	–	1	0	–	5	–	1
St. Augustine's	0	–	2	–	1	3	–	4	–	1
$ – Conference champion; Conference standings were based on the Dickinson System.; Rankings from the Pittsburgh Courier using the Dickinson Ratings System.

The 1947 Shaw Bears football team was an American football team that represented Shaw University as a member of the Colored Intercollegiate Athletic Association (CIAA) during the 1947 college football season. In their second season under head coach Howard K. Wilson, the team compiled a 10–0 record (6–0 against CIAA opponents), won the CIAA championship, and outscored opponents by a total of 246 to 39.

Key players included halfbacks Twillie Bellamy and Jim Jackson, fullback John Turner, end Bill Elliott, tackle Gladstone Booth, guard Leroy Way, and center Kermit Booker.

In post-season discussions about the black college football national championship, Shaw was criticized for a weak strength of schedule, having failed to schedule games against the three CIAA opponents that were ranked in the top 10 under the Dickinson Rating System: Hampton (No. 4), Virginia State (No. 7), and Morgan State (No. 9). In the final Dickinson ratings, Tennessee A&I was determined as the black college national champion with Shaw in fifth place. Florida A&M, a team that Shaw defeated by a 19–0 score, was ranked fourth under the Dickinson System. Shaw was, however, determined to be the CIAA champion under the Dickinson methodology.

== Schedule ==
Date	Opponent	Site	Result	Attendance	Source
September 27	at Fayetteville State*	Russell High School Stadium; Fayetteville, NC	W 21–0		
October 4	Florida A&M*	Chavis Park; Raleigh, NC	W 19–0		
October 11	at Saint Paul's (VA)	Russell Field; Lawrenceville, VA	W 71–0		
October 18	St. Augustine's	Chavis Park; Raleigh, NC	W 49–0		
October 25	at Morris Brown*	Ponce de Leon Park; Atlanta, GA	W 13–6		
November 1	Howard	Chavis Park; Raleigh, NC	W 22–14	4,000	
November 8	Virginia Union	Chavis Park; Raleigh, NC	W 12–6		
November 15	at Johnson C. Smith	American Legion Memorial Stadium; Charlotte, NC	W 19–6		
November 27	at North Carolina College	Durham Athletic Park; Durham, NC	W 12–7	7,000	
December 6	vs. South Carolina State	Griffith Stadium; Washington, DC (National Bowl)	W 8–0	5,000–6,000	
*Non-conference game
