= 1947 Morgan State Bears football team =

American college football season

1947 Morgan State Bears football
- Conference: Colored Intercollegiate Athletic Association
- Record: 5–2–1 (5–2–1 CIAA)
- Head coach: Edward P. Hurt (19th season)

1947 Colored Intercollegiate Athletic Association football standings
	Conf.					Overall
Team	W		L		T	W		L		T
No. 5 Shaw $	6	–	0	–	0	10	–	0	–	0
No. 7 Virginia State	7	–	1	–	0	8	–	1	–	0
No. 4 Hampton	5	–	1	–	1	7	–	2	–	1
No. 11 Howard	6	–	2	–	1	6	–	2	–	1
No. 9 Morgan State	5	–	2	–	1	5	–	2	–	1
No. 14 West Virginia State	4	–	1	–	1	6	–	3	–	1
No. 19 Lincoln (PA)	3	–	3	–	1	5	–	4	–	1
Delaware State	4	–	3	–	0	4	–	4	–	0
Virginia Union	3	–	5	–	0	4	–	5	–	0
Winston-Salem State	3	–	3	–	0	6	–	3	–	0
North Carolina A&T	1	–	5	–	1	1	–	5	–	1
North Carolina College	2	–	6	–	0	2	–	7	–	0
Bluefield State	1	–	5	–	0	3	–	6	–	0
Johnson C. Smith	1	–	7	–	0	1	–	8	–	0
Saint Paul's (VA)	0	–	5	–	1	0	–	5	–	1
St. Augustine's	0	–	2	–	1	3	–	4	–	1
$ – Conference champion; Conference standings were based on the Dickinson System.; Rankings from the Pittsburgh Courier using the Dickinson Ratings System.

The 1947 Morgan State Bears football team was an American football team that represented Morgan State College in the Colored Intercollegiate Athletic Association (CIAA) during the 1947 college football season. In their 19th season under head coach Edward P. Hurt, the Bears compiled a 5–2–1 record and outscored opponents by a total of 104 to 62. The team ranked No. 9 among the nation's black college football teams according to the Pittsburgh Courier and its Dickinson Rating System. Their only losses were to No. 7 Virginia State and No. 11 Howard.

== Schedule ==
Date	Time	Opponent	Site	Result	Attendance	Source
October 4		Delaware State	Baltimore, MD	W 31–0		
October 11		North Carolina College	Baltimore, MD	W 19–6		
October 17	8:00 p.m.	at Howard	Griffith Stadium; Washington, DC	L 6–14	9,500	
October 25		at Lincoln (PA)	Oxford, PA	W 14–7	2,000	
November 1		North Carolina A&T	Baltimore, MD	T 12–12		
November 8		Bluefield State	Baltimore, MD	W 13–0		
November 15		at Hampton	Armstrong Field; Hampton, VA	W 9–0	1,800	
November 27		Virginia State	Baltimore, MD	L 0–23	14,500	
All times are in Eastern time
