= Lee Royster =

American football and basketball coach (1937–2004)

Biographical details
- Born: April 29, 1937; Hampton, Virginia, U.S.
- Died: June 24, 2004 (aged 67); Hampton, Virginia, U.S.

Playing career

Football
- 1955–1958: Florida A&M
- Position: Quarterback

Coaching career (HC unless noted)

Football
- 1962: St. Augustine's (assistant)
- 1965–1966: Shaw
- 1967: Lane (assistant)
- 1978: Shaw (interim HC)

Basketball
- 1962–1963: St. Augustine's (assistant)
- 1963–1964: Hampton
- 1977–1978: Shaw

Head coaching record
- Overall: 4–15–2 (football); 11–19 (basketball)

Lee Alton Royster (April 29, 1937 – June 24, 2004) was an American college football and college basketball coach. He served as the head football coach at Shaw University from 1965 to 1966 and again on an interim basis in 1978. Royster was also the head basketball coach at Hampton University during the 1963–64 season.

== Head coaching record ==
=== Football ===
Year	Team	Overall	Conference	Standing	Bowl/playoffs
Shaw Bears (Central Intercollegiate Athletic Association) (1965–1966)
1965	Shaw	4–5	4–5	14th	
1966	Shaw	0–7–2	0–7–2	17th	
Shaw Bears (Central Intercollegiate Athletic Association) (1978)
1978	Shaw	0–2 (Note: Horace T. Small was Shaw's head coach for the first nine games of the 1978 season before he was fired. Royster served as interim head coach for the final two games. Shaw finished the year 0–11 overall and 0–8 in Central Intercollegiate Athletic Association (CIAA) play.)	0–2	11th	
Shaw:		4–15–2	4–15–2		
Total:		4–15–2			
