= 1947 Howard Bison football team =

American college football season

1947 Howard Bison football
- Conference: Colored Intercollegiate Athletic Association
- Record: 6–2–1 (6–2–1 CIAA)
- Head coach: Edward L. Jackson (3rd season)
- Home stadium: Brooks Stadium, Griffith Stadium

1947 Colored Intercollegiate Athletic Association football standings
	Conf.					Overall
Team	W		L		T	W		L		T
No. 5 Shaw $	6	–	0	–	0	10	–	0	–	0
No. 7 Virginia State	7	–	1	–	0	8	–	1	–	0
No. 4 Hampton	5	–	1	–	1	7	–	2	–	1
No. 11 Howard	6	–	2	–	1	6	–	2	–	1
No. 9 Morgan State	5	–	2	–	1	5	–	2	–	1
No. 14 West Virginia State	4	–	1	–	1	6	–	3	–	1
No. 19 Lincoln (PA)	3	–	3	–	1	5	–	4	–	1
Delaware State	4	–	3	–	0	4	–	4	–	0
Virginia Union	3	–	5	–	0	4	–	5	–	0
Winston-Salem State	3	–	3	–	0	6	–	3	–	0
North Carolina A&T	1	–	5	–	1	1	–	5	–	1
North Carolina College	2	–	6	–	0	2	–	7	–	0
Bluefield State	1	–	5	–	0	3	–	6	–	0
Johnson C. Smith	1	–	7	–	0	1	–	8	–	0
Saint Paul's (VA)	0	–	5	–	1	0	–	5	–	1
St. Augustine's	0	–	2	–	1	3	–	4	–	1
$ – Conference champion; Conference standings were based on the Dickinson System.; Rankings from the Pittsburgh Courier using the Dickinson Ratings System.

The 1947 Howard Bison football team was an American football team that represented Howard University as a member of the Central Intercollegiate Athletic Association (CIAA) during the 1947 college football season. In their third season under head coach Edward L. Jackson, the team compiled a 6–2–1 record, finished fourth in the CIAA, and outscored opponents by a total of 122 to 54. The team ranked No. 11 among the nation's black college football teams according to the Pittsburgh Courier and its Dickinson Rating System.

== Schedule ==
Date	Time	Opponent	Site	Result	Attendance	Source
September 27	2:00 p.m.	Bluefield State	Brooks Stadium; Washington, DC	W 7–0	8,000	
October 4		at West Virginia State	Lakin Field; Institute, WV	T 0–0	3,000	
October 11		at Virginia Union	Hovey Field; Richmond, VA	W 13–7		
October 17	8:00 p.m.	Morgan State	Griffith Stadium; Washington, DC	W 14–6	9,500	
October 25	2:00 p.m.	Johnson C. Smith	Brooks Stadium; Washington, DC	W 14–0	10,000	
November 1		at Shaw	Chavis Heights Park; Raleigh, NC	L 14–22	4,000	
November 8		Hampton	Brooks Stadium; Washington, DC	L 13–19	10,000	
November 15		Delaware State	Brooks Stadium; Washington, DC	W 27–0	2,500	
November 27		at Lincoln (PA)	Temple Stadium; Philadelphia, PA	W 29–0	13,000	
All times are in Eastern time
