= 1947 Bluefield State Big Blues football team =

American college football season

1947 Bluefield State Big Blues football
- Conference: Colored Intercollegiate Athletic Association
- Record: 3–6 (1–5 CIAA)
- Head coach: S. Walker (1st season)

1947 Colored Intercollegiate Athletic Association football standings
	Conf.					Overall
Team	W		L		T	W		L		T
No. 5 Shaw $	6	–	0	–	0	10	–	0	–	0
No. 7 Virginia State	7	–	1	–	0	8	–	1	–	0
No. 4 Hampton	5	–	1	–	1	7	–	2	–	1
No. 11 Howard	6	–	2	–	1	6	–	2	–	1
No. 9 Morgan State	5	–	2	–	1	5	–	2	–	1
No. 14 West Virginia State	4	–	1	–	1	6	–	3	–	1
No. 19 Lincoln (PA)	3	–	3	–	1	5	–	4	–	1
Delaware State	4	–	3	–	0	4	–	4	–	0
Virginia Union	3	–	5	–	0	4	–	5	–	0
Winston-Salem State	3	–	3	–	0	6	–	3	–	0
North Carolina A&T	1	–	5	–	1	1	–	5	–	1
North Carolina College	2	–	6	–	0	2	–	7	–	0
Bluefield State	1	–	5	–	0	3	–	6	–	0
Johnson C. Smith	1	–	7	–	0	1	–	8	–	0
Saint Paul's (VA)	0	–	5	–	1	0	–	5	–	1
St. Augustine's	0	–	2	–	1	3	–	4	–	1
$ – Conference champion; Conference standings were based on the Dickinson System.; Rankings from the Pittsburgh Courier using the Dickinson Ratings System.

The 1947 Bluefield State Big Blues football team was an American football team that represented Bluefield State College during the 1947 college football season. In its first and only season under head coach S. Walker, the team compiled a 3–6 record and outscored opponents by a total of 85 to 74.

== Schedule ==
Date	Time	Opponent	Site	Result	Attendance	Source
September 27	2:00 p.m.	at Howard	Brooks Stadium; Washington, DC	L 0–7	8,000	
October 4		Virginia State	Bluefield, WV	L 0–26		
October 11		Louisville Municipal*	Bluefield, WV	L 7–14		
October 18		at Winston-Salem State	Winston-Salem, NC	L 0–8		
October 25		at Saint Paul's (VA)	Lawrenceville, VA	W 48–0		
November 1		at West Virginia State	Institute, WV	L 0–6		
November 8		at Morgan State	Baltimore, MD	L 0–13		
November 15		Knoxville*	Bluefield, WV	W 18–0		
November 22		Kentucky State*	Bluefield, WV	W 12–0		
*Non-conference game; All times are in Eastern time
