= 1947 Hampton Pirates football team =

American college football season

1947 Hampton Pirates football

Orange Blossom Classic, L 0–7 vs. Florida A&M
- Conference: Colored Intercollegiate Athletic Association
- Record: 7–2–1 (5–1–1 CIAA)
- Head coach: James Griffin (3rd season)
- Home stadium: Armstrong Field

1947 Colored Intercollegiate Athletic Association football standings
	Conf.					Overall
Team	W		L		T	W		L		T
No. 5 Shaw $	6	–	0	–	0	10	–	0	–	0
No. 7 Virginia State	7	–	1	–	0	8	–	1	–	0
No. 4 Hampton	5	–	1	–	1	7	–	2	–	1
No. 11 Howard	6	–	2	–	1	6	–	2	–	1
No. 9 Morgan State	5	–	2	–	1	5	–	2	–	1
No. 14 West Virginia State	4	–	1	–	1	6	–	3	–	1
No. 19 Lincoln (PA)	3	–	3	–	1	5	–	4	–	1
Delaware State	4	–	3	–	0	4	–	4	–	0
Virginia Union	3	–	5	–	0	4	–	5	–	0
Winston-Salem State	3	–	3	–	0	6	–	3	–	0
North Carolina A&T	1	–	5	–	1	1	–	5	–	1
North Carolina College	2	–	6	–	0	2	–	7	–	0
Bluefield State	1	–	5	–	0	3	–	6	–	0
Johnson C. Smith	1	–	7	–	0	1	–	8	–	0
Saint Paul's (VA)	0	–	5	–	1	0	–	5	–	1
St. Augustine's	0	–	2	–	1	3	–	4	–	1
$ – Conference champion; Conference standings were based on the Dickinson System.; Rankings from the Pittsburgh Courier using the Dickinson Ratings System.

The 1947 Hampton Pirates football team was an American football team that represented Hampton Institute in the Colored Intercollegiate Athletic Association (CIAA) during the 1947 college football season. In their third non-consecutive year under head coach James Griffin, the Pirates compiled a 7–2–1 record, lost to Florida A&M in the Orange Blossom Classic, and outscored opponents by a total of 107 to 63. Hampton ranked No. 4 among the nation's black college football teams according to the Pittsburgh Courier and its Dickinson Rating System.

== Schedule ==
Date	Opponent	Site	Result	Attendance	Source
September 27	Fort Bragg 555th Paratroop Battalion*	Armstrong Field; Hampton, VA	W 19–0		
October 4	Johnson C. Smith	Armstrong Field; Hampton, VA	W 13–8		
October 11	at North Carolina A&T	Municipal Stadium; Greensboro, NC	W 7–0	5,000	
October 18	Tuskegee*	Armstrong Field; Hampton, VA	W 19–0		
October 25	Virginia State^{†}	Armstrong Field; Hampton, VA	W 16–13	6,500	
November 1	Lincoln (PA)	Armstrong Field; Hampton, VA	T 0–0		
November 8	at Howard	Brooks Stadium; Washington, DC	W 19–14	10,000	
November 15	Morgan State	Armstrong Field; Hampton, VA	L 0–9	1,800	
November 27	at Virginia Union	Hovey Field; Richmond, VA	W 14–13	4,000	
December 6	vs. Florida A&M*	Orange Bowl; Miami, FL (Orange Blossom Classic)	L 0–7	19,000	
*Non-conference game; ^{†}Homecoming
