= 1947 Lincoln Lions football team =

American college football season

1947 Lincoln Lions football
- Conference: Colored Intercollegiate Athletic Association
- Record: 5–4–1 (3–3–1 CIAA)
- Head coach: Manuel Rivero (13th season)

1947 Colored Intercollegiate Athletic Association football standings
	Conf.					Overall
Team	W		L		T	W		L		T
No. 5 Shaw $	6	–	0	–	0	10	–	0	–	0
No. 7 Virginia State	7	–	1	–	0	8	–	1	–	0
No. 4 Hampton	5	–	1	–	1	7	–	2	–	1
No. 11 Howard	6	–	2	–	1	6	–	2	–	1
No. 9 Morgan State	5	–	2	–	1	5	–	2	–	1
No. 14 West Virginia State	4	–	1	–	1	6	–	3	–	1
No. 19 Lincoln (PA)	3	–	3	–	1	5	–	4	–	1
Delaware State	4	–	3	–	0	4	–	4	–	0
Virginia Union	3	–	5	–	0	4	–	5	–	0
Winston-Salem State	3	–	3	–	0	6	–	3	–	0
North Carolina A&T	1	–	5	–	1	1	–	5	–	1
North Carolina College	2	–	6	–	0	2	–	7	–	0
Bluefield State	1	–	5	–	0	3	–	6	–	0
Johnson C. Smith	1	–	7	–	0	1	–	8	–	0
Saint Paul's (VA)	0	–	5	–	1	0	–	5	–	1
St. Augustine's	0	–	2	–	1	3	–	4	–	1
$ – Conference champion; Conference standings were based on the Dickinson System.; Rankings from the Pittsburgh Courier using the Dickinson Ratings System.

The 1947 Lincoln Lions football team was an American football team that represented Lincoln University of Pennsylvania as a member of the Colored Intercollegiate Athletic Association (CIAA) during the 1947 college football season. In their 13th season under head coach Manuel Rivero, the team compiled a 5–4–1 record and outscored opponents by a total of 164 to 120. The Lions were ranked No. 19 among the nation's black college football teams according to the Pittsburgh Courier and its Dickinson Rating System.

The team opened its season on September 20, 1947, with a game against Lock Haven State Teachers College in what was billed as "possibly the first regularly-scheduled football game anywhere between a Negro college and a predominantly-white institution."

== Schedule ==
Date	Time	Opponent	Site	Result	Attendance	Source
September 20		at Lock Haven*	Lock Haven, PA	L 0–19	4,000	
September 27	3:00 p.m.	at Fort Meade	Fort Meade, MD	W 32–0		
October 4		Saint Paul's (VA)	Oxford, PA	W 35–0		
October 11		at Delaware State	Wilmington, DE	W 20–7	2,000	
October 18		at Virginia Union	Norfolk, VA	L 7–19	4,000	
October 25		Morgan State	Oxford, PA	L 7–14	2,000	
November 1		at Hampton	Armstrong Field; Hampton, VA	T 0–0		
November 8		Fisk*	Oxford, PA	W 42–0		
November 15		at Winston-Salem	Winston-Salem, NC	W 21–6		
November 27		vs. Howard	Temple Stadium; Philadelphia, PA	L 0–29	13,000	
*Non-conference game; All times are in Eastern time
