= 1947 Delaware State Hornets football team =

American college football season

1947 Delaware State Hornets football
- Conference: Colored Intercollegiate Athletic Association
- Record: 4–4 (4–3 CIAA)
- Head coach: Tom Conrad (4th season)

1947 Colored Intercollegiate Athletic Association football standings
	Conf.					Overall
Team	W		L		T	W		L		T
No. 5 Shaw $	6	–	0	–	0	10	–	0	–	0
No. 7 Virginia State	7	–	1	–	0	8	–	1	–	0
No. 4 Hampton	5	–	1	–	1	7	–	2	–	1
No. 11 Howard	6	–	2	–	1	6	–	2	–	1
No. 9 Morgan State	5	–	2	–	1	5	–	2	–	1
No. 14 West Virginia State	4	–	1	–	1	6	–	3	–	1
No. 19 Lincoln (PA)	3	–	3	–	1	5	–	4	–	1
Delaware State	4	–	3	–	0	4	–	4	–	0
Virginia Union	3	–	5	–	0	4	–	5	–	0
Winston-Salem State	3	–	3	–	0	6	–	3	–	0
North Carolina A&T	1	–	5	–	1	1	–	5	–	1
North Carolina College	2	–	6	–	0	2	–	7	–	0
Bluefield State	1	–	5	–	0	3	–	6	–	0
Johnson C. Smith	1	–	7	–	0	1	–	8	–	0
Saint Paul's (VA)	0	–	5	–	1	0	–	5	–	1
St. Augustine's	0	–	2	–	1	3	–	4	–	1
$ – Conference champion; Conference standings were based on the Dickinson System.; Rankings from the Pittsburgh Courier using the Dickinson Ratings System.

The 1947 Delaware State Hornets football team represented Delaware State College—now known as Delaware State University—as a member of Colored Intercollegiate Athletic Association (CIAA) in the 1947 college football season. The Hornets compiled a 4–4 record under coach Tom Conrad.

== Schedule ==
Date	Time	Opponent	Site	Result	Attendance	Source
September 27		at North Carolina College	Durham, NC	W 7–0		
October 4		at Morgan State	Baltimore, MD	L 0–31		
October 11	2:15 p.m.	vs. Lincoln (PA)	Wilmington Park; Wilmington, DE	L 7–20	1,448	
October 18	2:30 p.m.	at Johnson C. Smith	American Legion Memorial Stadium; Charlotte, NC	W 11–7		
October 25		at Winston-Salem	Winston-Salem, NC	W 20–6		
November 8		at Wilberforce State*	Wilberforce Stadium; Wilberforce, OH	L 0–31		
November 15		at Howard	Brooks Stadium; Washington, DC	L 0–27	2,500	
November 22		Saint Paul's (VA)	Dover, DE	W 27–6		
*Non-conference game
