= 1955 Delaware State Hornets football team =

American college football season

1955 Delaware State Hornets football
- Conference: Central Intercollegiate Athletic Association
- Record: 7–1 (5–1 CIAA)
- Head coach: Edward L. Jackson (7th season)

1955 Central Intercollegiate Athletic Association football standings
	Conf.					Overall
Team	W		L		T	W		L		T
No. 2 Maryland State $	7	–	0	–	0	9	–	0	–	0
No. 12 Delaware State	5	–	1	–	0	7	–	1	–	0
No. 13 Morgan State	5	–	1	–	0	6	–	2	–	0
Winston-Salem State	5	–	1	–	0	6	–	2	–	0
No. 7 North Carolina A&T	4	–	1	–	2	4	–	1	–	3
No. 14 Virginia State	4	–	1	–	3	4	–	2	–	3
No. 9 North Carolina College	3	–	1	–	2	4	–	1	–	2
Shaw	4	–	2	–	2	4	–	3	–	2
Bluefield State	5	–	2	–	1	7	–	2	–	1
St. Augustine's	3	–	5	–	0	4	–	5	–	0
Hampton	4	–	6	–	0	4	–	6	–	0
Howard	2	–	4	–	0	3	–	6	–	0
Johnson C. Smith	2	–	4	–	0	3	–	4	–	0
Virginia Union	3	–	5	–	0	4	–	5	–	0
Saint Paul's (VA)	1	–	5	–	0	2	–	6	–	0
Lincoln (PA)	1	–	6	–	0	1	–	7	–	0
West Virginia State	0	–	6	–	0	1	–	7	–	0
Fayetteville State	0	–	8	–	0	0	–	9	–	0
$ – Conference champion; Rankings from the Pittsburgh Courier.

The 1955 Delaware State Hornets football team represented Delaware State College—now known as Delaware State University—as a member of the Central Intercollegiate Athletic Association (CIAA) in the 1955 college football season. Led by Edward L. Jackson in his seventh and final season as head coach, the Hornets compiled a 7–1 record for the second consecutive year, ranking 12th nationally. The team's only lost was by a field goal, against undefeated Maryland State. There were 3,500 fans in attendance, a record for Delaware State.

== Schedule ==
Date	Opponent	Site	Result	Attendance	Source
September 24	Cheyney*	Dover, DE	W 37–0		
October 1	at King's (PA)*	Wilkes-Barre, PA	W 13–0		
October 8	at Hampton	Armstrong Stadium; Hampton, VA	W 12–0		
October 15	at Johnson C. Smith	Charlotte, NC	W 20–6		
October 22	Lincoln (PA)	Dover, DE	W 18–0		
October 29	at Saint Paul's (VA)	Lawrenceville, VA	W 37–6		
November 5	Maryland State	Dover, DE	L 0–3	3,500	
November 19	St. Augustine's	Dover, DE	W 6–0		
*Non-conference game
