= Howard K. Wilson =

American football and basketball coach

Biographical details
- Born: c. 1906

Playing career

Football
- 1931–1933: Morgan

Basketball
- ?–1934: Morgan
- Positions: Quarterback, fullback (football)

Coaching career (HC unless noted)

Football
- 1941–1945: Winston-Salem State
- 1946–1953: Shaw
- 1958–?: Morgan State (assistant)

Basketball
- 1960–1971: Morgan State

Head coaching record
- Overall: 48–51–6 (football); 109–141 (basketball)
- Bowls: 1–2

Accomplishments and honors

Championships
- Football; 1 black college national (1947); 1 CIAA (1947)

Howard K. "Brutus" Wilson (born c. 1906) was an American college football and college basketball coach. He served as the head football coach at Winston-Salem Teachers College—now known as Winston-Salem State University—in Winston-Salem, North Carolina from 1941 to 1945 and Shaw University in Raleigh, North Carolina from 1946 to 1953. Wilson was also the head basketball coach at Morgan State College—now known as Morgan State University—in Baltimore, from 1960 to 1971, tallying a mark of 109–141. Wilson's 1947 Shaw Bears football team was undefeated, won the Colored Intercollegiate Athletic Association (CIAA) title, and was recognized as a black college football national champion.

Wilson graduated from Morgan State and earned a Master of Arts from Columbia University. Before moving to Winston-Salem State, he worked at the Johnston County Training School in Smithfield, North Carolina for six years.

Wilson was inducted into the CIAA Hall of Fame in 2001.

== Head coaching record ==
=== Football ===
Year	Team	Overall	Conference	Standing	Bowl/playoffs
Winston-Salem State Rams (Independent) (1941–1945)
1941	Winston-Salem State	5–0–3			
1942	Winston-Salem State	6–2			
1943	Winston-Salem State	3–5–1			W Flower
1944	Winston-Salem State	5–3			
1945	Winston-Salem State	0–7–1			
Winston-Salem State:		19–17–5			
Shaw Bears (Colored/Central Intercollegiate Athletic Association) (1946–1953)
1946	Shaw	3–3–1	3–3–1	8th	
1947	Shaw	10–0	6–0	1st	
1948	Shaw	5–5	4–3	8th	L Capital Bowl
1949	Shaw	7–2	7–2	4th	
1950	Shaw	1–8	1–8	15th	
1951	Shaw	1–9	1–8	15th	L Furniture Bowl
1952	No team				
1953	Shaw	2–7	2–4	9th	
Shaw:		29–34–1	24–28–1		
Total:		48–51–6			
National championship Conference title Conference division title or championship game berth
