= 1947 Virginia State Trojans football team =

American college football season

1947 Virginia State Trojans football
- Conference: Colored Intercollegiate Athletic Association
- Record: 8–1 (7–1 CIAA)
- Head coach: Harry R. Jefferson (14th season)
- Home stadium: Rogers Field

1947 Colored Intercollegiate Athletic Association football standings
	Conf.					Overall
Team	W		L		T	W		L		T
No. 5 Shaw $	6	–	0	–	0	10	–	0	–	0
No. 7 Virginia State	7	–	1	–	0	8	–	1	–	0
No. 4 Hampton	5	–	1	–	1	7	–	2	–	1
No. 11 Howard	6	–	2	–	1	6	–	2	–	1
No. 9 Morgan State	5	–	2	–	1	5	–	2	–	1
No. 14 West Virginia State	4	–	1	–	1	6	–	3	–	1
No. 19 Lincoln (PA)	3	–	3	–	1	5	–	4	–	1
Delaware State	4	–	3	–	0	4	–	4	–	0
Virginia Union	3	–	5	–	0	4	–	5	–	0
Winston-Salem State	3	–	3	–	0	6	–	3	–	0
North Carolina A&T	1	–	5	–	1	1	–	5	–	1
North Carolina College	2	–	6	–	0	2	–	7	–	0
Bluefield State	1	–	5	–	0	3	–	6	–	0
Saint Paul's (VA)	0	–	5	–	1	0	–	5	–	1
Johnson C. Smith	0	–	2	–	1	1	–	5	–	1
$ – Conference champion; Rankings from the Pittsburgh Courier using the Dickinson Ratings System.

The 1947 Virginia State Trojans football team was an American football team that represented Virginia State College as a member of the Colored Intercollegiate Athletic Association (CIAA) during the 1947 college football season. In their 14th season under head coach Harry R. Jefferson, the team compiled an 8–1 record, finished second in the CIAA, shut out seven of nine opponents, and outscored opponents by a total of 161 to 18. The team ranked No. 7 among the nation's black college football teams according to the Pittsburgh Courier and its Dickinson Rating System.

Key players included guard General Perry, tackle Orlandus Page, and tailback John "Kimbrough" Jones.

== Schedule ==
Date	Opponent	Site	Result	Attendance	Source
September 27	at Allen*	Columbia, SC	W 6–0		
October 4	at Bluefield State	Bluefield, WV	W 26–0		
October 11	Johnson C. Smith	Rogers Field; Petersburg, VA	W 40–0		
October 18	at North Carolina College	O'Kelly Field; Durham, NC	W 19–0	3,000	
October 25	at Hampton	Armstrong Field; Hampton, VA	L 13–16	6,500	
November 1	Virginia Union	Rogers Field; Petersburg, VA	W 9–2		
November 8	West Virginia State	Rogers Field; Petersburg, VA	W 19–0	2,500	
November 15	North Carolina A&T	Rogers Field; Petersburg, VA	W 6–0		
November 27	at Morgan State	Baltimore, MD	W 23–0	14,500	
*Non-conference game
