= James Griffin (American football coach) =

American football player and coach

Biographical details
- Born: November 1, 1918
- Died: March 13, 1992 (aged 73)

Playing career

Football
- 1937–1939: Hampton
- Positions: Halfback, safety

Coaching career (HC unless noted)

Football
- 1941–1942: Hampton
- 1947–1948: Hampton

Track and field
- 1940–1943: Hampton
- 1945–1970: Hampton

Head coaching record
- Overall: 21–10–5 (football)
- Bowls: 1–1

James Morgan Griffin Sr. (November 1, 1918 – March 13, 1992), sometimes known as "Little Train", was an American football player and coach and educator.

== Early years and education ==
Griffin was a native of Cape May, New Jersey. His father was a quarterback for the Hampton Pirates football team in the early 1900s.

Griffin enrolled at Hampton Institute, played at the halfback and safety positions for the Hampton Pirates football team from 1937 to 1939, and was captain of the 1938 and 1939 teams. He graduated from Hampton in 1940 with degrees in physical education and biology. He later received a master's degree in physical education from Springfield College in 1949 and a doctorate in education from New York University in 1961.

== Coaching and teaching career ==
In 1941, Griffin was hired as Hampton's head football coach. He held that position during the 1941 and 1942 seasons. During World War II, he served in the United States Army where he reached the rank of first lieutenant. He returned to Hampton as an assistant football coach in 1946 and resumed his role as head football coach in the fall of 1947. His 1947 Hampton team compiled a 7–1–1 record in the regular season and was rated No. 4 among the nation's black colleges before losing to No. 3 Florida A&M in the Orange Blossom Classic. He also coached the 1948 football team and compiled a 21–10–5 record in four seasons as head coach. He also served as Hampton's track coach from 1940 to 1970 with the exception of his period of military service from 1943 to 1945.

He remained a member of Hampton's physical education faculty until his retirement in 1984.

== Later years ==
Griffin later served on the Hampton School Board from 1984 to 1992. He was inducted into the Central Intercollegiate Athletic Association Hall of Fame in 1980 and the City of Hampton Hall of Fame in 1992.

Griffin and his wife, Audrey, had a son, James Jr., and three daughters, Patricia, Stephanie, Blondell, and Delcenia. He died from cancer in March 1992.

== Head coaching record ==
=== Football ===
Year	Team	Overall	Conference	Standing	Bowl/playoffs
Hampton Pirates (Colored Intercollegiate Athletic Association) (1941–1942)
1941	Hampton	6–2	6–2	5th	
1942	Hampton	4–1–3	3–1–3	5th	
Hampton Pirates (Colored Intercollegiate Athletic Association) (1947–1948)
1947	Hampton	7–2–1	5–1–1	3rd	L Orange Blossom Classic
1948	Hampton	4–5–1	2–5–1	12th	W Fish Bowl
Hampton:		21–10–5	16–9–1		
Total:		21–10–5			
