= 1947 West Virginia State Yellow Jackets football team =

American college football season

1947 West Virginia State Yellow Jackets football
- Conference: Colored Intercollegiate Athletic Association
- Record: 7–2–1 (4–1–1 CIAA)
- Head coach: Mark Cardwell (3rd season)
- Home stadium: Lakin Field

1947 Colored Intercollegiate Athletic Association football standings
	Conf.					Overall
Team	W		L		T	W		L		T
No. 5 Shaw $	6	–	0	–	0	10	–	0	–	0
No. 7 Virginia State	7	–	1	–	0	9	–	1	–	0
No. 4 Hampton	5	–	1	–	1	7	–	2	–	1
No. 11 Howard	6	–	2	–	1	6	–	2	–	1
No. 9 Morgan State	5	–	2	–	1	5	–	2	–	1
No. 14 West Virginia State	4	–	1	–	1	6	–	3	–	1
No. 19 Lincoln (PA)	3	–	3	–	1	5	–	4	–	1
Delaware State	4	–	3	–	0	4	–	4	–	0
Virginia Union	3	–	5	–	0	4	–	5	–	0
Winston-Salem State	3	–	3	–	0	6	–	3	–	0
North Carolina A&T	1	–	5	–	1	1	–	5	–	1
North Carolina College	2	–	6	–	0	2	–	7	–	0
Bluefield State	1	–	5	–	0	3	–	6	–	0
Saint Paul's (VA)	0	–	5	–	1	0	–	5	–	1
Johnson C. Smith	0	–	2	–	1	1	–	5	–	1
$ – Conference champion; Rankings from the Pittsburgh Courier using the Dickinson Ratings System.

The 1947 West Virginia State Yellow Jackets football team was an American football team that represented West Virginia State University as a member of the Colored Intercollegiate Athletic Association (CIAA) during the 1947 college football season. In their third season under head coach Mark Cardwell, the team compiled a 7–2–1 record, shut out five of ten opponents, and ranked No. 14 among the nation's black college football teams according to the Pittsburgh Courier and its Dickinson Rating System. The team played its home games at Lakin Field in Institute, West Virginia.

== Schedule ==
Date	Opponent	Site	Result	Attendance	Source
September 27	Virginia Union		W 19–12		
October 4	Howard	Lakin Field; Institute, WV	T 0–0	3,000	
October 11	Kentucky State*		W 13–9		
October 18	Tennessee A&I*	Lakin Field; Institute, WV	W 27–12		
October 25	at North Carolina A&T	Memorial Stadium; Greensboro, NC	W 7–0		
November 1	Bluefield State		W 6–0		
November 8	at Virginia State	Rogers Field; Petersburg, VA	L 0–19	2,500	
November 15	North Carolina College		W 25–0		
November 22	at Wilberforce State*	Wilberforce Stadium; Xenia, OH	L 0–31	3,000	
November 27	Wilberforce*		W 57–0		
*Non-conference game
