= Sherman Plunkett =

American football player (1933–1989)

- Plunkett in 1960

No. 79, 70
- Position: Offensive tackle

Personal information
- Born: April 17, 1933; Oklahoma City, Oklahoma, U.S.
- Died: November 18, 1989 (aged 56); Baltimore, Maryland, U.S.
- Listed height: 6 ft 2 in (1.88 m)
- Listed weight: 290 lb (132 kg)

Career information
- College: Maryland State
- NFL draft: 1956: 6th round, 71st overall pick

Career history

Playing
- Baltimore Colts (1958–1960); San Diego Chargers (1961-1962); New York Jets (1963-1967)

Coaching
- Harrisburg Capitols (1969) Assistant

Awards and highlights
- 2× NFL champion (1958, 1959); First-team All-Pro (1966); 2× AFL All-Star (1964, 1966)

Career NFL/AFL statistics
- Games played: 132
- Games started: 85
- Fumble recoveries: 1
- Stats at Pro Football Reference

Sherman Eugene Plunkett (April 17, 1933 – November 18, 1989) was an American football offensive tackle. Over a ten-year career he played in the National Football League (NFL), for the Baltimore Colts (1958 to 1960), and in the American Football League (AFL) from 1961–1967, for the San Diego Chargers (1961–1962) and the New York Jets (1963–1967). He was an American Football League All-Star in 1964 and 1966 and a 1st Team All-Pro All-AFL in 1966.

== Early life ==
Plunkett was born on April 17, 1933, in Oklahoma City, Oklahoma. He attended Frederick Douglass High School in Oklahoma City. At the time, Douglass was a segregated school. Plunkett played on the Douglass Trojans football team as a defensive tackle. As a junior, his 1949 Trojans team won a championship. In 1950, Plunkett was a team co-captain, weighing 247 pounds (112 kg), and known by the nickname "Big Plunk". Plunkett suffered a broken leg during the 1950 season in a game against Tulsa's Booker T. Washington High School. Plunkett, who would have weight issues throughout his career, ballooned up to 280 pounds in high school at one point.

== College football ==
Plunkett played college football at Maryland State College, in Princess Anne, Maryland (now known as the University of Maryland Eastern Shore). He was said to be able to "run like a reindeer" at his then playing weight of around 235 lbs.

Plunkett was a two-way tackle at Maryland State. His 1955 team went undefeated (9–0) and shut out its last five opponents. In 1954 and 1955, he was named first-team All-Central Intercollegiate Athletic Association (CIAA). In 1955, he was named a second-team Little All-American and a Pittsburgh Courier All-American. One of his teammates was Johnny Sample, an honorable mention Little All-American in 1955 and first-team All-CIAA (1954-55), who would also be Plunkett's teammate on the Baltimore Colts (1958-60) and New York Jets (1966-67). Like Plunkett, Sample was a member of the Colts 1958-59 championship teams, and was also on the New York Jets team that won Super Bowl III.

=== Hofstra game ===
While playing for Maryland State, he was involved in a gesture of good sportsmanship, when its coach told its players to ease up on their overmatched and under-manned opponents, Hofstra University. The then Flying Dutchmen of Hofstra had started the season with just twenty players before suffering injuries, and were in danger of having their program disbanded. Leading 28-0 early in the game, Maryland State intentionally never scored again in the game.

According to Sample, Maryland State coach Vernon McCain, simply told his players, "This is the first time we are playing this school. We do not want to embarrass them." Spared by their opponent's gallantry, Hofstra went on to finish the season 7-3.

== Professional football ==
=== Cleveland Browns, the U.S. Army, Baltimore Colts ===
Plunkett was drafted by the Cleveland Browns in 6th round of the 1956 NFL draft, 71st overall. He was the last man cut by coach Paul Brown, and did not make the 1956 Browns team. His NFL debut was delayed two years after being drafted into the US Army a few months later. He played football while in the Army at Fort Dix, learning from future NFL All-Pro defensive lineman Roosevelt Grier, also stationed at Fort Dix, among others, and gaining All-Army recognition. Future Green Bay Packer Hall of Fame defensive end Willie Davis was also on that All-Army team.

A free agent after leaving the Army, he was signed as a two-way tackle by the Baltimore Colts in 1958; though he chiefly played on kickoff and punt return teams that year, and did not start any games at tackle. He would occasionally replace future Hall of Fame tackle Jim Parker. During training camp, he would be the last one on the field, running extra laps until the coaches stopped him.

As a rookie, Plunkett played for the Colts in the 1958 NFL Championship Game, dubbed "The Greatest Game Ever Played", in which the Colts beat the New York Giants 23–17 in the NFL's first overtime championship game. In the game's first quarter, Plunkett's punt coverage resulted in the Giant's punt returner losing 10 yards in an effort to avoid Plunkett. The victory resulted in both his and the Colts' first ever title win. They would repeat together in 1959, again beating the Giants in the championship game.

During his three years in Baltimore, Plunkett never became a starter. However, Colts head coach Weeb Ewbank considered Plunkett a "fine athlete", "one of the first guys down on kickoffs", and the Colts' "special teams leader". Before the 1960 season, Ewbank thought about playing Plunkett at defensive tackle, but was concerned Plunkett lacked aggression.

Plunkett was known as "Big Boy" on the Colts, with his weight fluctuating between 280 (127 kg) to 320 pounds (145.1 kg). Still, he was one of the league's fastest moving linemen, and one of the fastest among all of the Colts players, having run the 50-yard dash in 4.9 seconds (while weighing over 280 pounds). At one point, however, Ewbank became sufficiently frustrated over Plunkett's weight that he sent Plunkett to Johns Hopkins Hospital to have his thyroid checked (there being nothing wrong after testing).

=== San Diego Chargers ===
In 1961, the Colts entered training camp in August planning to use Plunkett as a backup for Jim Parker and George Preas at offensive tackle, but Ewbank had warned Plunkett that he could lose his job if he did not control his weight. The Colts offered Plunkett a $500 bonus if he reported to training camp at 275 pounds, but he came in at 300 pounds. Less than a month later, Ewbank cut Plunkett from the team. Less than 10 days after that, the San Diego Chargers of the one-year old American Football League signed Plunkett.

The Chargers star offensive tackle Ron Mix (a future Pro Football Hall of Famer) had been called to National Guard service, and it was hoped Plunkett could fill in for Mix. Plunkett started eight games at tackle in 1961. In 1962, he started all 14 games at right tackle, with Mix starting all 14 games at right guard.

Mix returned to right tackle for the Chargers in 1963. In August 1963, the Chargers traded Plunkett to the New York Jets for a future draft choice.

=== New York Jets ===
With the Jets, Plunkett would once again be under head coach Weeb Ewbank, and once again have to deal with Ewbank's concerns over Plunkett's weight.

Plunkett became the Jets regular starting right tackle from 1963 to 1967. He was selected to play in the AFL All-Star game in 1964 and 1966. The Newspaper Enterprise Association (NEA) named him second-team All-AFL in 1964. In 1965, the NEA again named him second-team All-AFL, as did the Associated Press (AP). In 1966, the AP named him first-team All-AFL. Plunkett started all 14 Jets games in 1967; however, his pass blocking for Jets future Hall of Fame quarterback Joe Namath, his most valuable skill for the Jets, had declined during the 1967 season from prior years. According to Namath, it was Plunkett who coined his iconic nickname "Broadway Joe", following Namath's appearance on the cover of Sports Illustrated.

Over Plunkett's years with the Jets, Ewbank had unsuccessfully tried weight loss bonuses, a $1,000 incentive for Plunkett's wife to bring his weight down, and fines to keep Plunkett under 300 pounds; but nothing worked. Ewbank was concerned the combination of weight and age were undermining Plunkett's abilities going into the 1968 season, ordering Plunkett to weigh no more than 300 pounds when arriving for training camp. Instead, Plunkett weighed 336 pounds when he arrived that August.

When more weight loss incentives failed, in late July 1968, Ewbank demoted Plunkett from starting right tackle and required Plunkett to pay his own expenses during training camp until meeting his weight loss goals. In mid-August, the Jets finally waived Plunkett, making the 1967 season his last in professional football. He would not be on the 1968 Jets team that won Super Bowl III.

=== Weight ===
Plunkett's weight may have been viewed differently in a later era. Plunkett has been described as "a lineman with a giant paunch but dancing feet". He was known in his later playing years for his then-massive bulk, being listed as high as 330 lb. (149.7 kg) in an era when the typical offensive lineman in the 1960s weighed between 240-250 lb. (108.9-113.4 kg).

The average weight of the Super Bowl I champion Green Bay Packers' offensive line of 1966 was 247 lb., with its two offensive tackles each weighing 250 lb. (Hall of Famer Forrest Gregg and Bob Skoronski). By the first decade of the 2000s, Plunkett's high of 330 lb. would not even be among the very heaviest offensive linemen. In 2002, the average weight of the Dallas Cowboys' offensive line was 338.4 lb., with its two tackles Flozell Adams and Solomon Page weighing 357 lb. and 325 lb. respectively. In 2003, over 200 offensive linemen weighed in excess of 300 pounds, with the average weights of each team's offensive line ranging from 295.8 lb. to 322.8 lb. These greater weights, however, raised greater concerns about health risks to the linemen.

Ironically, one of Ewbank's defining physical characteristics as the Jets coach was his notably "rotund" physique. Namath once called the 5 ft 7 in (1.7 m) 195 lb. (88.5 kg) Ewbank a "little butterball".

== Personal life ==
Plunkett had made his home in West Baltimore. After retiring from professional football, Annapolis, Maryland mayor Roger Moyer offered Plunkett a job in the city's recreation department, where he worked with children for the next 17 years, with a focus on children in public housing.

== Death ==
Plunkett died of cancer at the age of 56, at Sinai Hospital in Baltimore. He is buried in Oklahoma City.

== See also ==
- List of American Football League players
