= Vernon McCain =

American football and basketball coach (1908–1993)

Biographical details
- Born: June 4, 1908; Marietta, Oklahoma, U.S.
- Died: April 5, 1993 (aged 84); Oxon Hill, Maryland, U.S.

Playing career

Football
- 1930: Langston
- Position: Quarterback

Coaching career (HC unless noted)

Football
- 1931–1941: Wewoka Douglass HS (OK)
- 1942–1944: Douglass HS (OK)
- 1945–1947: Tennessee A&I (assistant)
- 1948–1963: Maryland State

Basketball
- 1950–1954: Maryland State

Administrative career (AD unless noted)
- 1948–1964: Maryland State

Head coaching record
- Overall: 101–21–6 (college football)
- Bowls: 0–2

Accomplishments and honors

Championships
- Football; 3 CIAA (1955, 1957, 1960)
- College Football Hall of Fame; Inducted in 2006 (profile)

Vernon E. "Skip" McCain (June 4, 1908 – April 5, 1993) was an American college football and college basketball coach and mathematics professor. He served as the head football coach at Maryland State College—now known as the University of Maryland Eastern Shore—from 1948 to 1963, compiling a record of 101–21–6. McCain was inducted into the College Football Hall of Fame in 2006.

McCain was born in Marietta, Oklahoma. He played football as a quarterback at Langston University in 1930. Prior to being hired at Maryland State in 1948, McCain was an assistant coach at Tennessee Agricultural & Industrial State College—now known as Tennessee State University. He died on April 5, 1993, at his home in Oxon Hill, Maryland.

== Head coaching record ==
=== College football ===
| Year | Team | Overall | Conference | Standing | Bowl/playoffs |
|---|---|---|---|---|---|
Maryland State Raiders/Hawks (Independent) (1948–1953)
| 1948 | Maryland State | 7–1 | | | |
| 1949 | Maryland State | 8–0 | | | |
| 1950 | Maryland State | 8–0 | | | |
| 1951 | Maryland State | 7–1 | | | |
| 1952 | Maryland State | 9–1 | | | |
| 1953 | Maryland State | 7–1 | | | |
Maryland State Hawks (Central Intercollegiate Athletic Association) (1954–1963)
| 1954 | Maryland State | 6–1–1 | 5–0–1 | 3rd | L Orange Blossom Classic |
| 1955 | Maryland State | 9–0 | 7–0 | 1st | |
| 1956 | Maryland State | 6–2–1 | 5–1–1 | 4th | |
| 1957 | Maryland State | 6–1–1 | 6–0–1 | 1st | L Orange Blossom Classic |
| 1958 | Maryland State | 4–3 | 4–3 | 7th | |
| 1959 | Maryland State | 6–1–1 | 6–1 | 6th | |
| 1960 | Maryland State | 5–1–1 | 5–0–1 | 1st | |
| 1961 | Maryland State | 4–2–1 | 2–2–1 | 5th | |
| 1962 | Maryland State | 5–2 | 5–2 | 5th | |
| 1963 | Maryland State | 4–4 | 3–4 | 11th | |
| Maryland State: | | 101–21–6 | 48–13–5 | | |
| Total: | | 101–21–6 | | | |
National championship Conference title Conference division title or championship game berth
