= John Chavis Memorial Park =

Public park in Raleigh, North Carolina

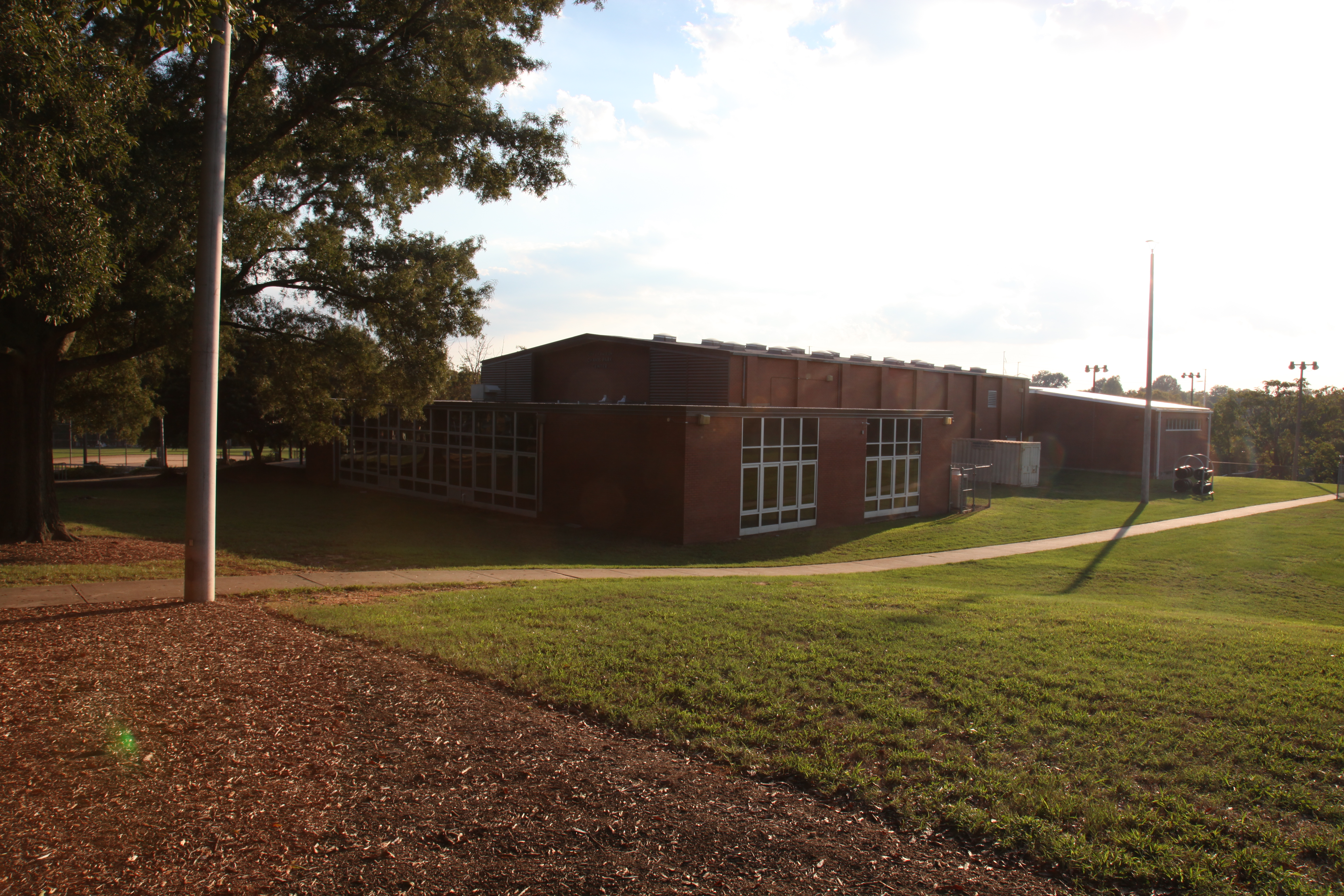
Photo of John Chavis Memorial Park

John Chavis Memorial Park, also known as Chavis Park, is a public park spanning 28.87 acres near Shaw University in the South Park neighborhood of Southeast Raleigh, North Carolina. Built in 1937, Chavis Park attracted carloads of visitors from across North Carolina on its opening day. Its main attraction continues to be a historic, Allan Herschell carousel.

Chavis Park was added to the National Park Service's National Register of Historic Places on April 19, 2016.

== History ==
Chavis Park is named after John Chavis, a free Black educator, Presbyterian minister, and American Revolutionary War veteran. In 1808, he opened his first school, the site of which was located near the grounds of modern-day Chavis Park.

The park, which was dedicated in 1938, was built in the South Park district in 1937 with funding from the Works Progress Administration, demonstrating the complicity of federal government with Jim Crow laws. The park also received backing from local government and civic organizations to provide "separate but equal" parity with nearby Pullen Park, which allowed Black Americans into the park and to picnic there but barred them from using the swimming pool and other facilities. On its opening day, Chavis Park attracted crowds of visitors, and it continued to regularly attract visitors from all over Eastern North Carolina during segregation.

=== Original design ===
Chavis Park was designed by G. Robert Derick, a National Park Service landscape architect, who chose rustic, natural materials with the goal of blending the natural with the manmade, reflecting the design movement of the era that historians dub "parkitechture". He chose roughly coursed, brown and tan stone exteriors for the amphitheater and for the park's two bridges which cross a small stream as well as exposed, rough-log shelter frames which blended with the park's mature-canopy trees. The park featured a historic, Allan Herschell carousel, a pool, a bathhouse, and simple picnic shelters. Soon afterwards, fields for track and baseball were added to the park.

=== Post-segregation renovations ===
After Raleigh was desegregated, the park underwent several renovations:

- In 1972, Jerry Turner & Associates reduced the size of the Olympic-sized swimming pool and built the community center.
- In 2013, the carousel was moved from the center of the park to a climate-controlled carousel house, although the carousel pavilion remains in its original, central location.

Although the City of Raleigh has made and plans to continue to make improvements to the park, some express dismay that the former community jewel has not received the renovations they feel it deserves as a symbol of Raleigh's African American heritage. The old community center was demolished. The new community center was completed in June 2021 and will be dedicated to John Chavis. The new facility had its dedication ceremony on June 12, 2021.

== Attractions ==
The main attraction at Chavis Park is its early 20th-century carousel.

=== Chavis Park Carousel ===
The Chavis Park Carousel, a No. 2, Special Three-Abreast, Allan Herschell Carousel, showcases a Wurlitzer 146A band organ, oil paintings of waterfalls and other natural scenes, and thirty-six jumping, hand-carved, hand-painted horses. The carousel was designed circa 1913 and was bought for the park for $4,000 in 1937. Like the nearby Pullen Park Carousel, it is one of fewer than three hundred remaining of its kind. The carousel is stop number sixteen on Raleigh's Historic Capital City Trail.

== Facilities ==
Chavis Park has several indoor and outdoor spaces available to the public and for rent. In addition a playground, tennis courts, and a pool, the park offers a community center, picnic shelters, a gymnasium, a lit, outdoor track, a fitness center, and a game room. A half-mile of Raleigh's Capital Area Greenway traverses the park via Little Rock Trail.

== National Register of Historic Places ==
John Chavis Memorial Park meets several criteria to be listed as part of the National Register of Historic Places.

Chavis Park meets:

- Criterion A for entertainment/recreation and ethnic heritage: Black and social history
- Criterion C for landscape architecture at the state level

According to the National Park Service, the park's historical period of significance ranges from 1937 to 1965.
