= St. Augustine's Falcons =

- University: St. Augustine's University
- Nickname: Falcons
- NCAA: Division II
- Conference: None, independent as of 2025
- Athletic director: Dr. J. Lin Dawson (last)
- Location: Raleigh, North Carolina
- Varsity teams: 10 (5 men's, 5 women's)
- Football stadium: George Williams Athletic Complex
- Basketball arena: Emery Gymnasium
- Baseball stadium: USA Baseball National Training Complex
- Softball stadium: Oakwood Park
- Colors: Blue and white
- Mascot: Auggie
- Website: saintaugfalcons.com
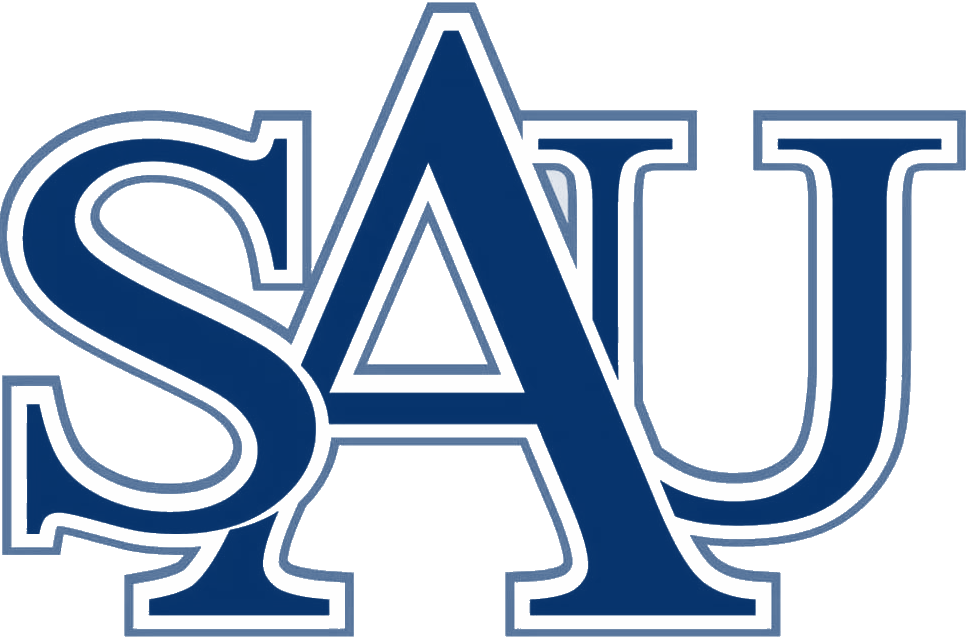

The St. Augustine's Falcons were the athletic teams that from 1933 to 2024 represented St. Augustine's University, located in Raleigh, North Carolina, in NCAA Division II intercollegiate sports. During their history, the Falcons competed as members of the Central Intercollegiate Athletic Association for all 13 varsity sports.

== Record ==
Saint Augustine's holds the distinction as the most decorated Division II athletics program, with a record 37 NCAA team titles and 265 individual titles. This also places them as the fourteenth-most productive athletics program across all three divisions. All of those championships have come in either men's indoor (13 team, 75 individual), women's indoor (6 team, 41 individual), men's outdoor (14 team, 105 individual), or women's outdoor (4 team, 44 individual) track and field.

== Discontinuation of programs ==
In December 2024, the CIAA indefinitely suspended Saint Augustine's for noncompliance with NCAA and CIAA requirements, and revoked its membership in June 2025. Saint Augustine's filed for Chapter 11 bankruptcy on April 27, 2026 due to its severe fiscal crisis. It additionally halted efforts to continue as an accredited institution, and reverted to unaccredited status after May 15.

== Varsity teams ==
Men's sports	Women's sports
Basketball	Basketball
Cross Country	Cross Country
Football	Softball
Golf	Track & Field
Track & Field	Volleyball

== National championships ==
As of the 2018–19 season, the Falcons have won 38 team national titles, the most of any active Division II athletics program. Note: All titles belong to NCAA's Division II

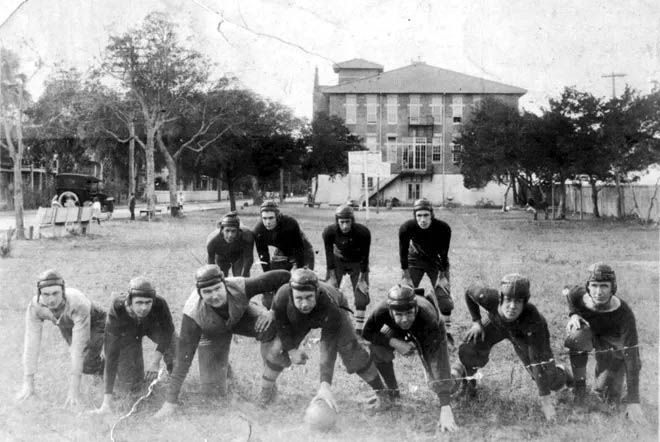
St. Augustine football team of 1914

Sport	Year	Rival	Score
Men's track and field (indoor) (13)	1987	Mount Saint Mary's	74–38 (+36)
Men's track and field (indoor) (13)	1988	Mount Saint Mary's	62–38 (+28)
Men's track and field (indoor) (13)	1989	Mankato State	94–31 (+63)
Men's track and field (indoor) (13)	1990	Abilene Christian	70–46 (+24)
Men's track and field (indoor) (13)	1991	Southeast Missouri State	98–36 (+62)
Men's track and field (indoor) (13)	1992	Abilene Christian; Norfolk State	81–24 (+57)
Men's track and field (indoor) (13)	1995	Abilene Christian	90 3/4–84 3/4 (+6)
Men's track and field (indoor) (13)	2001	NYIT	74–48 (+26)
Men's track and field (indoor) (13)	2006	Abilene Christian	66 1/2–55 (+11.5)
Men's track and field (indoor) (13)	2008	Abilene Christian	68–49 (+19)
Men's track and field (indoor) (13)	2009	Abilene Christian	105–80 (+25)
Men's track and field (indoor) (13)	2013	Ashland	72–59 1/2 (+12.5)
Men's track and field (indoor) (13)	2014	Adams State	84 1/2–83 (+1.5)
Women's track and field (indoor) (6)	1985	NYIT	77–40 (+37)
Women's track and field (indoor) (6)	1987	Hampton	73–62 (+11)
Women's track and field (indoor) (6)	2001	Abilene Christian	63–48 (+15)
Women's track and field (indoor) (6)	2003	Abilene Christian	73–53 (+20)
Women's track and field (indoor) (6)	2005	Abilene Christian	53–48 1/2 (+4.5)
Women's track and field (indoor) (6)	2007	Lincoln (MO)	105–64 (+41)
Men's track and field (outdoor) (16)	1989	Angelo State	107 1/2–84 (+23.5)
Men's track and field (outdoor) (16)	1990	Cal State Northridge	111–60 (+51)
Men's track and field (outdoor) (16)	1991	Angelo State	120–63 1/2 (+56.5)
Men's track and field (outdoor) (16)	1992	Abilene Christian	95–63 (+32)
Men's track and field (outdoor) (16)	1993	Abilene Christian	116–107 (+9)
Men's track and field (outdoor) (16)	1994	Abilene Christian	118–117 (+1)
Men's track and field (outdoor) (16)	1995	Abilene Christian	140 1/2–95 (+35.5)
Men's track and field (outdoor) (16)	1998	Abilene Christian	97–80 (+17)
Men's track and field (outdoor) (16)	2001	Abilene Christian	80–59 (+21)
Men's track and field (outdoor) (16)	2009	Abilene Christian	94–86 (+8)
Men's track and field (outdoor) (16)	2010	Abilene Christian	82–62 (+20)
Men's track and field (outdoor) (16)	2013	Ashland	105–57 (+48)
Men's track and field (outdoor) (16)	2014	Adams State	112–67 (+45)
Men's track and field (outdoor) (16)	2015	Findlay	53–50 (+3)
Men's track and field (outdoor) (16)	2016	Texas A&M–Kingsville	85–36 (+49)
Men's track and field (outdoor) (16)	2017	Lincoln (MO)	58–52 (+6)
Women's track and field (outdoor) (4)	1997	Abilene Christian	81–69 (+12)
Women's track and field (outdoor) (4)	2000	Abilene Christian	77–66 (+11)
Women's track and field (outdoor) (4)	2001	Western State	80–59 (+21)
Women's track and field (outdoor) (4)	2002	North Dakota State	54–53 (+1)
