= Saint Paul's College (Virginia) =

Historically Black college in Lawrenceville, Virginia, US (1888–2013)

- Former names: Saint Paul Normal and Industrial School; Saint Paul’s Polytechnic Institute
- Motto: "challenge by choice"
- Type: Private historically black college
- Active: 1888–2013
- Location: Lawrenceville, Virginia, United States; 36°45′42″N 77°50′58″W
- Colors: Black and Orange
- Nicknames: Tigers and Lady Tigers
- Mascot: Tiger
- Website: saintpauls.edu
- St. Paul's College
- U.S. National Register of Historic Places
- Virginia Landmarks Register
- Location within Virginia Location within the United States
- Location: St. Paul's College campus, Lawrenceville, Virginia
- Coordinates: 36°45′39″N 77°51′0″W
- Area: 2 acres (0.81 ha)
- Built: 1883
- Architectural style: Late Gothic Revival
- NRHP reference No.: 79003032
- VLR No.: 251-0003

Significant dates
- Added to NRHP: June 27, 1979
- Designated VLR: March 20, 1979

Saint Paul's College was a private historically black college in Lawrenceville, Virginia. Saint Paul's College opened on September 24, 1888, originally training students as teachers and for agricultural and industrial jobs.

By the late 20th century, Saint Paul's College offered undergraduate degrees for traditional college students and distant learning students in the Continuing Studies Program. The college also offered adult education to help assist working adults to gain undergraduate degrees. Saint Paul's College had a Single Parent Support System Program that assisted single teen parents pursuing a college education.

The college had long struggled with significant financial difficulties, culminating in a court conflict in 2012 with its regional accreditor, the Southern Association of Colleges and Schools. Throughout the 2012–13 school year, the college sought to merge with another institution, but on June 3, 2013, the board announced the college would close on June 30, 2013.

== Campus ==
Saint Paul's eleven-building campus was situated on 185 acres (0.75 km^{2}) of green hills. Older buildings were constructed by students and donated by friends of the College. The college has been listed on the National Register of Historic Places.

== History ==
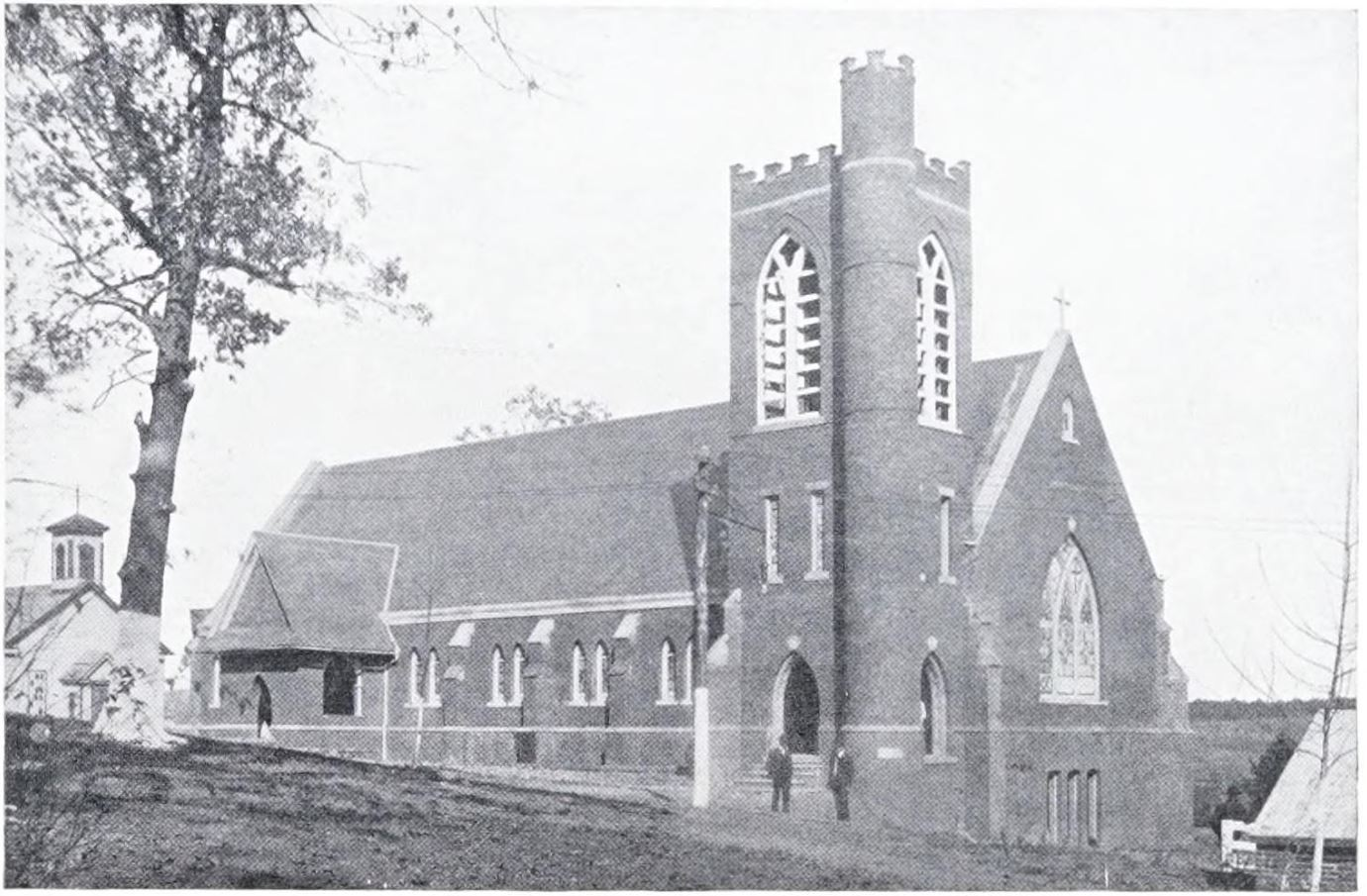
The chapel at the school, built by students, c. 1910

On September 24, 1888, James Solomon Russell of the Protestant Episcopal Church founded the Saint Paul Normal and Industrial School, with fewer than a dozen students. The school was intended chiefly to develop African-American teachers, a critical and prestigious job in the late 19th and early 20th-century South. In 1914 the school boasted that "The location of the school in the heart of the Black Belt of Virginia, with a Negro population of 100,000 almost at its very doors, is most favorable for the prosecution of uplift work."

In 1941 the name of the institution was changed to Saint Paul's Polytechnic Institute when the state granted the school authority to offer a four-year program. The first bachelor's degree was awarded in 1944. In 1957 the college adopted its present name to reflect its liberal arts and teacher education curricula.

In June 2012, the college's regional accreditor, the Southern Association of Colleges and Schools Commission on Colleges, stripped the college of its accreditation. Although the college had been on probation, it lost its accreditation for "violations concerning financial resources, institutional effectiveness in support services, institutional effectiveness in academics and student services, lack of terminal degrees for too many faculty members, and a lack of financial stability." The college sued the accreditor, and two months later a court issued a preliminary injunction reinstating the college's probationary accreditation to protect it during further legal proceedings. Although supporters worked on plans to have St. Augustine's University in Raleigh, North Carolina, another historically black university of Episcopal heritage, acquire St Paul's, the deal was abandoned in May 2013. Shortly thereafter, St. Paul's College reported to SACS that it would close on June 30, 2013.

In 2017 the Pension Benefit Guaranty Corporation, which had assumed ownership of most of the former campus, sold the property to a Chinese-related firm that has not announced its plans.

== Academics ==
The college focused on liberal arts, social sciences, education, business, mathematics, and natural sciences. It was committed to the development of "students who will be equipped to live effectively in a global society."

=== Student support ===
Saint Paul's College developed the Single Parent Support System (SPSS), the only program of its kind in the United States. Initiated in 1987, the SPSS was an on-campus residential educational program designed for single parents with two or fewer children between the ages of two months to nine years old.

The program required students to attend the college year round on a full-time basis and maintain a projected graduation progression of three to four years, with a 2.5 G.P.A. each year. A significant aspect of the SPSS was a faculty mentoring system that assisted participants with choosing a major. Tutorial assistance and counseling services were available, and the college provided seminars that focused on academic success, transition to college, career planning, and parenting. The college also provided child care assistance.

== Athletics ==
Saint Paul's athletic teams were known as the Tigers and Lady Tigers. The college was a member of the Division II level of the National Collegiate Athletic Association (NCAA), primarily competing in the Central Intercollegiate Athletic Association (CIAA) from 1923–24 to 2010–11.

Saint Paul's competed in 14 intercollegiate varsity sports: Men's sports included baseball, basketball, cross country, football, golf, tennis and track & field; while women's sports included basketball, bowling, cross country, softball, tennis, track & field and volleyball.

The college discontinued its athletic programs in July 2011 in an effort to alleviate financial difficulties. The football team had costs of $300,000 to $400,000 annually.

== Notable alumni ==
- Billy Eckstine – jazz and pop singer, bandleader
- Helen G. Edmonds, first African-American woman to earn a doctorate from Ohio State University, to become a graduate school dean and the first to second the nomination of a United States presidential candidate.
- Tony Hughes – former head football coach for Jackson State and current associate head coach and tight ends coach for Mississippi State
- Greg Jackson – former head men's basketball coach at Delaware State University
- Sidney Lowe – former head coach for Vancouver Grizzlies and Minnesota Timberwolves; later NC State.
- Martha Namundjebo-Tilahun, businesswoman, former president of the Namibia Chamber for Commerce and Industry
- Stella Oduah – politician, former Minister of Aviation, Nigeria. (disputed by the college as they did not award advanced degrees)
- Antwain Smith – former American professional basketball player.
- Greg Toler – NFL cornerback
