= List of people from Orange, New Jersey =

People who were born in, residents of, or otherwise closely associated with Orange, New Jersey include:

- Anthony Accetturo (born 1938), former caporegime and leader of the New Jersey faction of the Lucchese crime family, The Jersey Crew
- Robert Adams (born 1937), photographer who has focused on the changing landscape of the American West
- Stephanie Adams (1970–2018), model and author; November 1992 Playboy Playmate
- Walter G. Alexander (1880–1953), first African-American member of the New Jersey Legislature
- Jay Alford (born 1983), defensive tackle for the Oakland Raiders drafted in the third round of the 2007 NFL draft (81st overall)
- Peter Allgeier, U.S. deputy trade representative 2001–2009
- George Armstrong (1924–1993), catcher, played eight MLB games in 1946 with the Philadelphia Athletics
- Tom Auth (born 1968), rower, competed at the 1996 Summer Olympics and the 2000 Summer Olympics
- Bobby Bandiera (born 1953), rock guitarist, singer, and songwriter; lead guitarist for Southside Johnny and the Asbury Jukes
- James J. Barry Jr. (born 1946), politician, served in the New Jersey General Assembly, director of the New Jersey Division of Consumer Affairs
- Dan Baum (1956–2020), journalist and author who wrote for The Wall Street Journal, The New Yorker, Rolling Stone, Wired, Playboy, and The New York Times Magazine
- Stephen J. Benkovic (born 1938), chemist
- Douglas J. Bennet (1938–2018), political official, fifteenth president of Wesleyan University
- John L. Blake (1831–1899), represented New Jersey's 6th congressional district 1879–1881
- Ken Blanchard (born 1939), author, works include The One Minute Manager
- Thomas Aloysius Boland (1896–1979), prelate of the Roman Catholic Church; archbishop of Newark 1952–1974
- Cory Boyd (born 1985), former starting tailback for the University of South Carolina and drafted by the Tampa Bay Buccaneers in the 7th round (238th pick overall) of the 2008 NFL draft
- Sandra Boynton (born 1953), humorist, songwriter, director, music producer, children's author and illustrator
- Roger Breslin (1937–2025), attorney; prosecutor of Bergen County, New Jersey 1977–1982
- G. Michael Brown (1942–2025), gaming regulator in New Jersey, lawyer for the gaming industry, chief executive officer of Foxwoods Resort Casino
- Garrett Brown Jr. (born 1943), former United States district judge and later chief judge of the United States District Court for the District of New Jersey
- Lesley Bush (born 1947), diver, represented the United States at the 1964 Summer Olympics in Tokyo, where she received a gold medal in platform diving
- Samuel P. Bush (1863–1948), industrialist and patriarch of the Bush political family
- Bisa Butler (born 1973), fiber artist known for her quilted portraits and designs celebrating black life
- Peter Cain (1959–1997), artist best known for his meticulously executed paintings and drawings of surreal and aberrant versions of automobiles
- Ernest Trow Carter (1866–1953), organist and composer, won the Bispham Award
- Herbert S. Carter (1869–1927), physician and writer
- Dennis M. Cavanaugh (born 1947), retired United States district judge of the United States District Court for the District of New Jersey
- Robert Hett Chapman (1771–1833), Presbyterian minister and missionary and the second president of the University of North Carolina at Chapel Hill
- Evans Clark (1888–1970), writer strongly committed to first to Communist and Socialist causes and then liberal socio-economic issues
- Richard Codey (1946–2026), politician; served in the New Jersey Legislature 1974–2024; 53rd governor of New Jersey 2004–2006
- Steven A. Cohen (born 1953), academic who has taught public management and environmental policy at Columbia University since 1981
- Harold L. Colburn Jr. (1925–2012), physician and politician; served in the New Jersey General Assembly representing the 8th Legislative District 1984–1995
- Corinne Alsop Cole (1886–1971), politician, served two terms as a member of the Connecticut House of Representatives
- Samuel Colgate (1822–1897), manufacturer and philanthropist, headed the soap company that is now part of Colgate-Palmolive, benefactor of Colgate University
- John Condit (1755–1834), politician, United States representative and senator from New Jersey
- Silas Condit (1778–1861), politician; represented New Jersey in the United States House of Representatives 1831–1833
- Peter Cortes (born 1947), rower, competed in the men's quadruple sculls event at the 1976 Summer Olympics
- Bob Cottingham (born 1966), Olympic fencer, competed in the sabre events at the 1988 and 1992 Summer Olympics
- John Crotty (born 1969), former NBA basketball player for the Cleveland Cavaliers, Portland Trail Blazers and Denver Nuggets
- Bobby Czyz (born 1962), champion prizefighter
- Brian E. Daley (born 1940), professor of theology, received the Ratzinger Prize in 2012
- Pete D'Alonzo (1929–2001), football player, played two seasons with the Detroit Lions of the NFL
- William Howe Davis (1904–1982), politician; mayor of Orange for 12 years; director of the New Jersey Division of Alcoholic Beverage Control during the administration of Governor Robert B. Meyner
- Constance Adams DeMille (1874–1960), actress and wife of director Cecil B. DeMille
- Wayne Dickens, former American football player and coach; head football coach at Kentucky State University 2009–2012 and The College of New Jersey 2013–2015
- S. Kip Farrington (1904–1983), sport fisherman and journalist
- David Ferry (1924–2023), poet and translator, won the National Book Award for Poetry in 2012
- Dale S. Fischer (born 1951), United States district court judge
- Gail Fisher (1935–2000), actress best known for her role on Mannix
- Buddy Fortunato (born 1946), newspaper publisher and politician, served four terms in the New Jersey General Assembly
- Charles N. Fowler (1852–1932), represented 5th congressional district in the United States House of Representatives 1895–1911
- Tony Galento (1910–1979), heavyweight boxer
- Robert E. Grady (born 1959), venture capitalist and investment banker
- William Haddon (1926–1985), public health researcher and official
- Al Harrington (born 1980), professional basketball player for the NBA's Denver Nuggets, Golden State Warriors and Washington Wizards
- Edward V. Hartford (1870–1922), founder and president of the Hartford Suspension Company who perfected the automobile shock absorber
- George Huntington Hartford (1833–1917), mayor 1878–1890; owner of the Great Atlantic and Pacific Tea Company, the country's largest food retailer at the time of his death
- Beatrice Hicks (1919–1979), founder of the Society of Women Engineers in 1950
- Cleo Hill (1938–2015), professional basketball player, played one season in the NBA for the St. Louis Hawks
- Dulé Hill (born 1975), actor, known for starring in TV series Psych and The West Wing
- Monte Irvin (1919–2016), former Negro leagues and MLB outfielder, MLB executive and member of the Baseball Hall of Fame
- Bobby M. Jones (born 1972), pitcher, played for the New York Mets during his MLB career
- Philip D. Kaltenbacher (born 1937), former chairman and CEO of Seton Company; former chairman of the Port Authority of New York and New Jersey
- Mark Kelly (born 1964), astronaut; first went into space as the pilot for STS-108 Endeavour (December 5–17, 2001), and returned to space with STS-121 in 2006 as the pilot; his twin brother, Scott Kelly, is also in the Astronaut Corps
- Thomas Kiernan (1933–2003), writer of biographies of Laurence Olivier, Jane Fonda, John Steinbeck, and Yasser Arafat
- Jay Lynch (1945–2017), cartoonist best known for his comic strip Nard n' Pat
- Phyllis Mangina (born 1959), college basketball coach, assistant women's basketball coach at Saint Peter's
- William F. Marsh (1916–1995), politician, served in the California State Assembly for the 42nd district 1953–1959
- John B. Mason (1858–1919), stage actor
- Lowell Mason (1792–1872), composer of over 1600 hymn tunes, including his arrangement of "Joy to the World"
- Elmer Matthews (1927–2015), lawyer and politician, served three terms in the New Jersey General Assembly
- George McClellan (1826–1885), American Civil War general and later governor of New Jersey, died here
- Warren Sturgis McCulloch (1898–1969), neurophysiologist and cybernetician who made contributions to artificial intelligence and cybernetics
- Donald W. McGowan (1899–1967), United States Army major general and chief of the National Guard Bureau
- James T. McHugh (1932–2000), prelate of the Roman Catholic Church; bishop of Camden (1989–1998) and bishop of Rockville Centre (2000)
- John Milnor (born 1931), mathematician known for his work in differential topology, K-theory, and dynamical systems; recipient of the Fields Medal, Wolf Prize, and Abel Prize
- Daniel F. Minahan (1877–1947), mayor of Orange 1914–1919; represented New Jersey's 6th congressional district 1919–1921 and 1923–1925
- Tina Nenoff (born 1965), materials scientist and chemical engineer at Sandia National Laboratories
- Gordon Allen Newkirk Jr. (1928–1985), astrophysicist best known for his research on the solar corona
- Yosh Nijman (born 1995), American football offensive tackle for the Green Bay Packers of the National Football League
- Henry Steel Olcott (1832–1907), founder and first president of the Theosophical Society, first well-known person of European ancestry to make a formal conversion to Buddhism, helped create a Buddhist renaissance, assisted in designing the Buddhist flag, a national hero of Sri Lanka
- Chris Petrucelli (born 1962), soccer manager; head coach of the Chicago Red Stars in the National Women's Soccer League
- Joel A. Pisano (1949–2021), district judge of the United States District Court for the District of New Jersey 2000–2001
- Carolyn Plaskett (1917–2001), American-born illustrator, international scholar and former first lady of Barbados
- Nicole Pride, academic administrator, twelfth president of West Virginia State University
- Daniel Quillen (1940–2011), mathematician known for being the "prime architect" of higher algebraic K-theory and recipient of the Fields Medal
- Bill Raftery (born 1943), basketball analyst and former college basketball coach
- Jim Ringo (1931–2007), NFL player for the Green Bay Packers and Philadelphia Eagles, member of the Pro Football Hall of Fame
- Stuart Risch, retired United States Army major general; 41st Judge Advocate General of the United States Army
- Ta'Quan Roberson (born 2000), American football quarterback for the Buffalo Bulls
- Jack Robinson (1921–2000), professional baseball pitcher whose MLB career consisted of three games played for the Boston Red Sox in 1949
- Robert E. Rose (1939–2022), politician; 26th lieutenant governor of Nevada 1975–1979
- Johnny Sansone (born 1957), electric blues singer, songwriter, harmonicist, accordionist, guitarist and piano player
- Dick Savitt (1927–2023), tennis player, reached a ranking of No. 2 in the world
- Roy Scheider (1932–2008), actor known for films such as Jaws, All That Jazz and The French Connection
- Morton Schindel (1918–2016), educator, producer, and founder of Weston Woods Studios, which specializes in adapting children's books into animated films
- Peter Shapiro (born 1952), financial services executive and former politician; youngest person ever elected to the New Jersey General Assembly; Essex County executive
- John M. Smith (1935–2019), prelate of the Roman Catholic Church; ninth bishop of Trenton 1997–2010
- John B. Stetson (1830–1906), hat manufacturer, invented the Stetson hat
- Leigh Howard Stevens (born 1953), marimba artist best known for developing, codifying and promoting the Stevens technique
- Lucy Stone (1818–1893), abolitionist and suffragist who staged a tax protest in 1857 over her lack of representation as a homeowner in Orange
- Gregory J. Studerus (born 1948), prelate of the Roman Catholic Church; auxiliary bishop for the Archdiocese of Newark
- Salamishah Tillet (born 1975), feminist activist, scholar and writer
- Robert F. Titus (1926–2024), United States Air Force brigadier general and fighter pilot
- George Tully (1904–1980), NFL player with the Frankford Yellow Jackets
- Cornelius Clarkson Vermeule III (1925–2008), scholar of ancient art; curator of classical art at the Museum of Fine Arts, Boston 1957–1996
- Dionne Warwick (born 1940), singer, actress, television host, and former Goodwill Ambassador for the UN's Food and Agriculture Organization
- Khalil Wheeler-Weaver (born 1996), serial killer
