= Crudup =

Crudup is a surname. Notable people with the surname include:

- Arthur Crudup (1905–1974), Delta blues singer-songwriter and guitarist
- Billy Crudup (born 1968), American actor
- Byrd D. Crudup (1897–1960), American football and basketball coach
- Derrick Crudup (born 1965), American football player
- Jevon Crudup (born 1972), American basketball player and coach
- Josiah Crudup (1791–1872), U.S. Congressman
- Ronnie Crudup Jr. (born 1977), American politician
