= Edward Morrison (American football) =

American football player and coach (1894–1961)

Biographical details
- Born: October 11, 1894; Chelsea, Massachusetts, U.S.
- Died: February 15, 1961 (aged 66); Philadelphia, Pennsylvania, U.S.

Playing career
- 1916: Tufts
- Position: Guard

Coaching career (HC unless noted)
- 1920–1922: Howard
- 1924: Howard
- 1927–1928: Lincoln (PA)

Head coaching record
- Overall: 21–14–5

Accomplishments and honors

Championships
- 1 black college national (1920); 1 CIAA (1920)

George Edward Morrison (October 11, 1894 – February 15, 1961) was an American college football player and coach. He served as the head football coach at Howard University in Washington, D.C. from 1920 to 1922 and again in 1924, and Lincoln University in Pennsylvania compiling a career college football record of 21–14–5. His 1920 Howard Bison football team won the Colored Intercollegiate Athletic Association (CIAA) title and was recognized as a black college football national champion.

== Early years ==
George Edward Morrison or Ted as family and friends called him, was born in Chelsea Massachusetts to George and Minnie Morrison. He was an only child.

Morrison played baseball and football at Everett High School. He then enrolled at Tufts University in 1915.

As a player for Tufts University during the 1916 season, he was the target of significant racial discrimination. During a game against Princeton, he sustained injuries as the result of dirty play at that hands of Princeton players.

Later that season, the team had a game at Indiana University. The team's hotel initially denied Morrison and another black teammate a room. In response, Tufts coach Charles Whelan protested and said that if the black players weren't accommodated, he would take his team back to Massachusetts without playing. The hotel quickly acquiesced, and Tufts won the game, 12–10.

== Coaching career ==
From 1918 to 1920, Morrison studied dentistry at Howard University in Washington, D.C. He served as the head football coach at Howard from 1920 to 1922 and again in 1924, winning a black college football national championship in 1920. It was under Dr. Morrison's leadership that Howard's football team adopted the Bison mascot which went on to become the official university mascot.

Morrison became the head football coach and taught dentistry at Lincoln University in Pennsylvania in 1927.

== Later life ==
He was first married to Alice Washington, and then married CarLynne Payne in 1924. Dr. Morrison & Carlynne first resided in Washington, DC, where she taught at Paul Lawerence Dunbar HS.

In 1928, after coaching life Dr. Morrison relocated to Philadelphia with his family where he opened his dental practice in North Philadelphia. He resided there with his family for the remainder of his life. He died at his home on February 15, 1961. He was survived by his wife CarLynne, his children Evelyn, Edward, Patrica, William, and many grand and great-grandchildren.

== Head coaching record ==
Year	Team	Overall	Conference	Standing	Bowl/playoffs
Howard Bison (Colored Intercollegiate Athletic Association) (1920–1922)
1920	Howard	7–0	5–0	1st	
1921	Howard	6–1	4–1	2nd	
1922	Howard	4–2	2–2	T–3rd	
Howard Bison (Colored Intercollegiate Athletic Association) (1924)
1924	Howard	2–1–3	1–1–1	7th	
Howard:		19–4–3	12–4–1		
Lincoln Lions (Colored Intercollegiate Athletic Association) (1927–1928)
1927	Lincoln	1–6	1–4	6th	
1928	Lincoln	1–4–2	1–3–2	6th	
Lincoln:		21–14–5	2–7–2		
Total:		21–14–5			
National championship Conference title Conference division title or championship game berth
