= List of North Carolina Central Eagles men's basketball head coaches =

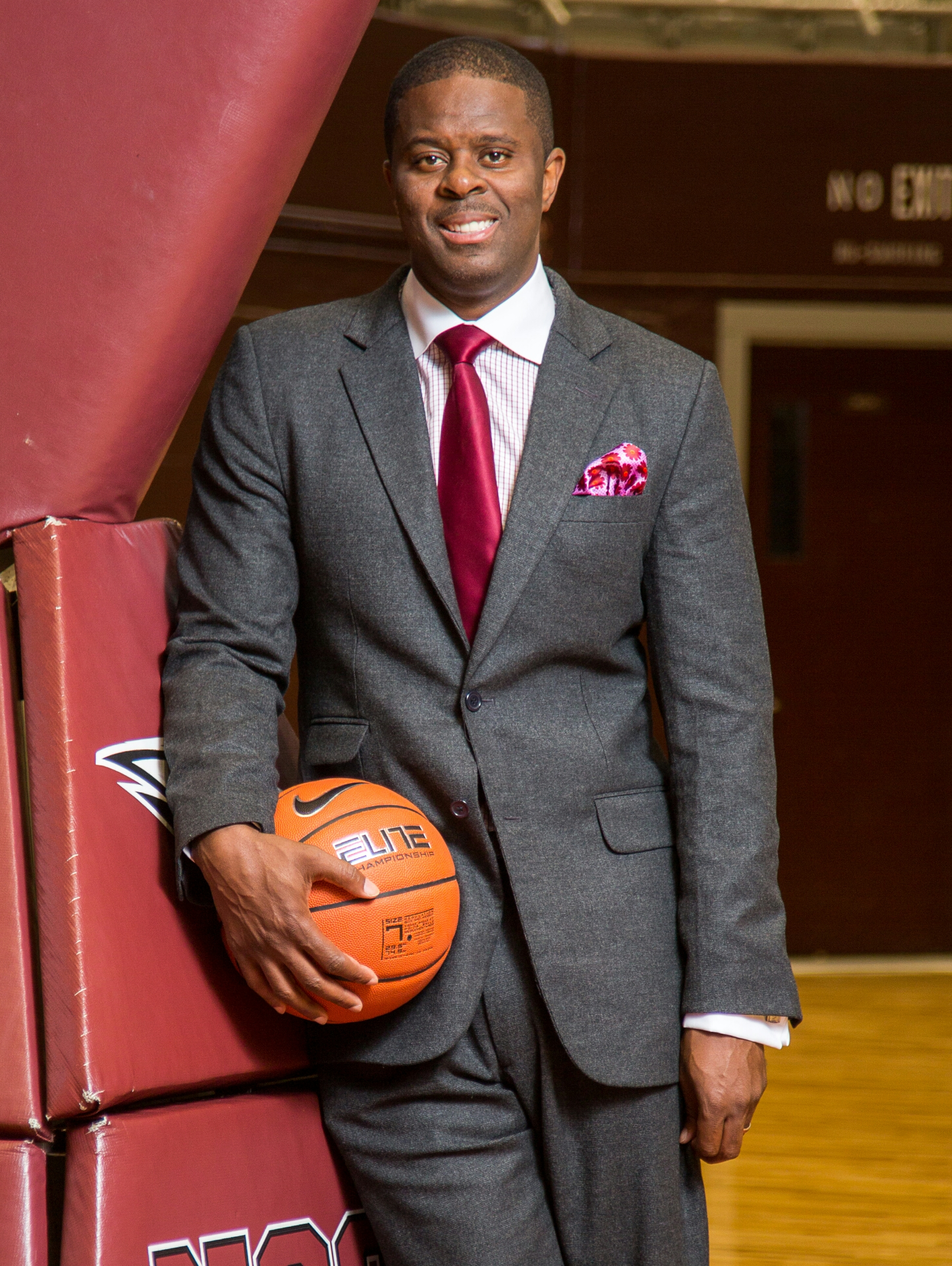
LeVelle Moton, the current head coach of the North Carolina Central Eagles.

The following is a list of North Carolina Central Eagles men's basketball head coaches. There have been 17 head coaches of the Eagles in their 90-season history.

North Carolina Central's current head coach is LeVelle Moton. He was hired as the Eagles' head coach in March 2009, replacing Henry Dickerson, whose contract was not renewed after the 2008–09 season.

| No. | Tenure | Coach | Years | Record | Pct. |
|---|---|---|---|---|---|
| 1 | 1927–1928 | Byrd D. Crudup | 1 | 0–6 | .000 |
| 2 | 1929–1930 | David Waters | 1 | 0–2 | .000 |
| 3 | 1935–1936 | Leo Townsend | 1 | 0–11 | .000 |
| 4 | 1936–1937 | Edward H. Adams | 1 | 3–6 | .333 |
| 5 | 1937–1940 | Franklin Burghardt | 3 | 47–21 | .691 |
| 6 | 1940–1952 | John McLendon | 12 | 239–68 | .779 |
| 7 | 1952–1970 | Floyd Brown | 18 | 251–194 | .564 |
| 8 | 1970–1973; 1984–1985 | Harry Edmonds | 4 | 23–72 | .242 |
| 9 | 1973–1974 | Sam Jones | 1 | 5–16 | .238 |
| 10 | 1974–1978 | Sterling Holt | 4 | 37–71 | .343 |
| 11 | 1978–1979 | Frank Silva | 1 | 5–21 | .192 |
| 12 | 1979–1984 | Jesse Clements | 5 | 50–79 | .388 |
| 13 | 1985–1991 | Michael Bernard | 6 | 115–56 | .673 |
| 14 | 1991–2000 | Greg Jackson | 9 | 164–78 | .678 |
| 15 | 2000–2004 | Phil Spence | 4 | 49–64 | .434 |
| 16 | 2004–2009 | Henry Dickerson | 5 | 47–98 | .324 |
| 17 | 2009–present (Note: North Carolina Central vacated 16 wins from the 2012–13 season. Moton's on-court record is 246–184 (.572).) | LeVelle Moton | 14 | 230–184 | .556 |
| Totals | | 17 coaches | 90 seasons | 1,266–1,045 | .548 |
Records updated through end of 2022–23 season Source
