= 1924 Howard Bison football team =

American college football season

1924 Howard Bison football
- Conference: Colored Intercollegiate Athletic Association
- Record: 2–1–3 (1–1–1 CIAA)
- Head coach: Edward Morrison (4th season)
- Home stadium: Griffith Stadium

1924 Colored Intercollegiate Athletic Association football standings
	Conf.					Overall
Team	W		L		T	W		L		T
Lincoln (PA) $	5	–	0	–	1	7	–	0	–	1
Virginia Union	3	–	1	–	2	4	–	1	–	3
Hampton	3	–	3	–	1	4	–	3	–	1
Virginia Normal	1	–	2	–	3	5	–	3	–	3
Virginia Seminary	2	–	3	–	0	4	–	4	–	0
Shaw	1	–	2	–	1	1	–	2	–	2
Howard	1	–	1	–	1	2	–	1	–	3
Saint Paul's (VA)	0	–	4	–	1	4	–	4	–	2
$ – Conference champion

The 1924 Howard Bison football team represented Howard University as a member of the Colored Intercollegiate Athletic Association (CIAA) during the 1924 college football season. Led by Edward Morrison in his fourth and final season as head coach, the Bison compiled an overall record of 2–1–3 with a mark of 1–1–1 in conference play.

== Schedule ==
Date	Time	Opponent	Site	Result	Attendance	Source
October 3		North Carolina A&T*	Howard campus; Washington, DC	T 0–0		
October 24	3:00 p.m.	West Virginia Collegiate*	Griffith Stadium; Washington DC	T 0–0		
November 1		at Wilberforce*	Wilberforce campus; Wilberforce, OH	W 7–0		
November 8		at Virginia Normal	Petersburg VA	T 0–0	2,000	
November 14	2:30 p.m.	Hampton	Griffith Stadium; Washington, DC	W 13–0	3,000	
November 27	2:00 p.m.	Lincoln (PA)^{†}	Griffith Stadium; Washington DC (Annual Football Classic)	L 0–31	15,000	
*Non-conference game; ^{†}Homecoming; All times are in Eastern time
