= 1923 Tuskegee Golden Tigers football team =

American college football season

1923 Tuskegee Golden Tigers football
- Conference: Southern Intercollegiate Athletic Conference
- Record: 7–1–1 (3–1–1 SIAC)
- Head coach: Cleve Abbott (1st season)
- Captain: Ashton C. Kitchen
- Home stadium: Washington Field

The 1923 Tuskegee Golden Tigers football team represented the Tuskegee Normal and Industrial Institute—now known as Tuskegee University—as a member of the Southern Intercollegiate Athletic Conference (SIAC) during the 1923 college football season. Led by first-year head coach Cleve Abbott, the Golden Tigers compiled an overall record of 7–1–1 with a mark of 3–1–1 in conference play. Abbott was assisted by T. C. Meyers and J. H. Brown. Tuskegee played home games at Washington Field in Tuskegee, Alabama

== Schedule ==
Date	Time	Opponent	Site	Result	Attendance	Source
October 6		Clark (GA)	Washington Field; Tuskegee, AL	W 35–0		
October 13		Fort Valley High and Industrial School*	Washington Field; Tuskegee, AL	W 26–0	2,500	
October 20		Atlanta	Washington Field; Tuskegee, AL	T 7–7	4,000	
October 26	3:00 p.m.	at Alabama State	Paterson Field; Montgomery, AL	W 13–6	4,000	
November 3		at Morehouse	Atlanta, GA	L 0–6		
November		at Walker Baptist Institute	Augusta, GA	W 53–0		
November 9	2:00 p.m.	at South Carolina State*	State College Park; Orangeburg, SC	W 13–6	3,500	
November 17		24th Infantry, Fort Benning*	Tuskegee, AL	W 10–7		
November 29		at Talladega	Talladega, AL	W 7–0		
*Non-conference game; All times are in Central time
