= 1923 Howard Bison football team =

American college football season

1923 Howard Bison football

Black college national champion
- Conference: Colored Intercollegiate Athletic Association
- Record: 7–0–1 (3–0–1 CIAA)
- Head coach: Louis L. Watson (1st season)
- Home stadium: American League Park

1923 Colored Intercollegiate Athletic Association football standings
	Conf.					Overall
Team	W		L		T	W		L		T
Virginia Union $	5	–	0	–	0	5	–	0	–	2
Howard	3	–	0	–	1	7	–	0	–	1
Hampton	4	–	2	–	0	5	–	2	–	0
Virginia Normal	3	–	3	–	0	4	–	3	–	0
Lincoln (PA)	1	–	1	–	2	5	–	1	–	2
Saint Paul (VA)	2	–	3	–	1	6	–	3	–	1
Virginia Seminary	1	–	4	–	0	3	–	6	–	0
Shaw	0	–	5	–	0	0	–	5	–	0
$ – Conference champion

The 1923 Howard Bison football team was an American football team that represented Howard University during the 1923 college football season. In their first year under head coach Louis L. Watson, the Bison compiled a 7–0–1 record, outscored opponents by a total of 96 to 19, and were recognized as the black college national champion.

The championship game between Howard and Lincoln attracted 25,000 spectators, "the largest crowd in the history of colored football" to that time.

== Schedule ==
Date	Time	Opponent	Site	Result	Attendance	Source
October 6		North Carolina A&T*	Howard campus; Washington, DC	W 7–0		
October 13		Virginia Seminary	Howard campus; Washington, DC	W 13–0		
October 20		Livingstone*	Howard campus; Washington, DC	W 15–0		
October 26	3:00 p.m.	Morehouse*	American League Park; Washington, DC	W 10–0		
November 2	3:00 p.m.	Wilberforce*	American League Park; Washington, DC	W 7–0	4,000	
November 10	3:00 p.m.	Virginia Normal	American League Park; Washington, DC	W 19–7		
November 17	2:00 p.m.	at Hampton	Armstrong Field; Hampton, VA	W 19–6		
November 29	2:00 p.m.	vs. Lincoln (PA)	National League Park; Philadelphia, PA	T 6–6	25,000	
*Non-conference game; All times are in Eastern time
