= 1920 Morehouse Maroon Tigers football team =

American college football season

1920 Morehouse Maroon Tigers football

SIAC champion
- Conference: Southern Intercollegiate Athletic Conference
- Record: 5–1 (4–0 SIAC)
- Head coach: B. T. Harvey (5th season)
- Home stadium: Morehouse athletic field

The 1920 Morehouse Maroon Tigers football team represented Morehouse College as a member of the Southern Intercollegiate Athletic Conference (SIAC) during the 1920 college football season. Led by fifth-year head coach B. T. Harvey, the Maroon Tigers compiled an overall record of 5–1 with a mark of 4–0 in conference play, winning the SIAC title.

== Schedule ==
Date	Time	Opponent	Site	Result	Source
October 23		Paine*	Atlanta, GA	W 21–0	
October 30		Morris Brown	Morris Brown campus; Atlanta, GA	W 21–0	
November 6		Fisk	Morehouse athletic field; Atlanta, GA	W 21–13	
November 12		Virginia Union*	Atlanta, GA	L 0–7	
November 20	2:45 p.m.	at Atlanta	Atlanta University campus; Atlanta, GA	W 24–13	
November 25	3:30 p.m.	at Knoxville	Booker Washington Park; Knoxville, TN	W 28–0	
*Non-conference game; All times are in Eastern time
