= 1923 Morehouse Maroon Tigers football team =

American college football season

1923 Morehouse Maroon Tigers football

SIAC co-champion
- Conference: Southern Intercollegiate Athletic Conference
- Record: 6–2–1 (5–1 SIAC)
- Head coach: B. T. Harvey (8th season)
- Home stadium: Morehouse athletic field

The 1923 Morehouse Maroon Tigers football team represented Morehouse College as a member of the Southern Intercollegiate Athletic Conference (SIAC) during the 1923 college football season. Led by eighth-year head coach B. T. Harvey, the Maroon Tigers compiled an overall record of 6–2–1 with a mark of 5–1 in conference play, sharing the SIAC title with Fisk.

== Schedule ==
Date	Time	Opponent	Site	Result	Source
October 6		24th Infantry, Fort Benning*	Atlanta, GA	W 30–6	
October 13	3:00 p.m.	at Livingstone*	Livingstone field; Salisbury, NC	T 6–6	
October 20		Clark (GA)	Atlanta, GA	W 46–0	
October 26	3:00 p.m.	at Howard*	American League Park; Washington, DC	L 0–10	
November 3		Tuskegee	Atlanta, GA	W 6–0	
November 9		Morris Brown	Atlanta, GA	W 6–0	
November 17		Talladega	Atlanta, GA	W 19–12	
November 24		Alabama State	Atlanta, GA	W 25–0	
November 29		at Fisk	Nashville, TN	L 0–6	
*Non-conference game; All times are in Eastern time
