= 1921 Morehouse Maroon Tigers football team =

American college football season

1921 Morehouse Maroon Tigers football

SIAC champion
- Conference: Southern Intercollegiate Athletic Conference
- Record: 6–0 (4–0 SIAC)
- Head coach: B. T. Harvey (6th season)
- Home stadium: Morehouse athletic field

The 1921 Morehouse Maroon Tigers football team represented Morehouse College as a member of the Southern Intercollegiate Athletic Conference (SIAC) during the 1921 college football season. Led by sixth-year head coach B. T. Harvey, the Maroon Tigers compiled an overall record of 6–0 with a mark of 4–0 in conference play, winning the SIAC title.

== Schedule ==
Date	Opponent	Site	Result	Source
October 22	Camp Benning*	Atlanta, GA	W 40–18 or 41–18	
October 29	Morris Brown	Morehouse athletic field; Atlanta, GA	W 7–0	
November 5	Biddle*	Atlanta, GA	W 41–0	
November 12	Knoxville	Morehouse athletic field; Atlanta, GA	W 13–0	
November 19	Atlanta	Morehouse athletic field; Atlanta, GA	W 7–0	
November 24	at Fisk	Sulphur Dell; Nashville, TN	W 6–0	
*Non-conference game

== Reserves schedule ==
Date	Opponent	Site	Result
November 24	at Knox Institute*	Athens, GA	W 7–0
*Non-conference game
