= 1920 Howard Bison football team =

American college football season

1920 Howard Bison football

Black college national champion
- Conference: Colored Intercollegiate Athletic Association
- Record: 7–0 (5–0 CIAA)
- Head coach: Edward Morrison (1st season)

1920 Colored Intercollegiate Athletic Association football standings
	Conf.					Overall
Team	W		L		T	W		L		T
Howard	5	–	0	–	0	7	–	0	–	0
Virginia Union	1	–	1	–	0	6	–	2	–	0
Shaw	2	–	2	–	0	2	–	2	–	1
Hampton	2	–	3	–	0	4	–	3	–	1
Lincoln (PA)	1	–	2	–	0	3	–	2	–	0
Virginia Normal	0	–	3	–	0	3	–	4	–	0

The 1920 Howard Bison football team was an American football team that represented Howard University during the 1920 college football season. In their first year under head coach Edward Morrison, the Bison compiled a 7–0 record, did not allow opponents to score a point, and outscored all opponents by a total of 132 to 0. For the first time following the 1920 season, the Pittsburgh Courier selected a black college national champion with Howard and Talladega sharing the honor.

== Schedule ==
Date	Opponent	Site	Result	Attendance	Source
October 15	Shaw	Raleigh, NC	W 26–0		
October 23	at Virginia Normal	Petersburg, VA	W 19–0		
October 30	West Virginia Collegiate*	Howard field; Washington, DC	W 7–0		
November 6	Union (VA)	Washington, DC	W 7–0		
November 13	Hampton	Washington, DC	W 18–0		
November 20	at Virginia Seminary*	Lynchburg, VA	W 13–0		
November 25	Lincoln (PA)	American League Park; Washington, DC	W 42–0	6,000	
*Non-conference game
