= 1923 Virginia Union Panthers football team =

American college football season

1923 Virginia Union Panthers football

Black college national co-champion CIAA champion
- Conference: Colored Intercollegiate Athletic Association
- Record: 5–0–2 (5–0 CIAA)
- Head coach: Harold D. Martin (3rd season)
- Home stadium: Hovey Field

1923 Colored Intercollegiate Athletic Association football standings
	Conf.					Overall
Team	W		L		T	W		L		T
Virginia Union $	5	–	0	–	0	5	–	0	–	2
Howard	3	–	0	–	1	7	–	0	–	1
Hampton	4	–	2	–	0	5	–	2	–	0
Virginia Normal	3	–	3	–	0	4	–	3	–	0
Lincoln (PA)	1	–	1	–	2	5	–	1	–	2
Saint Paul (VA)	2	–	3	–	1	6	–	3	–	1
Virginia Seminary	1	–	4	–	0	3	–	6	–	0
Shaw	0	–	5	–	0	0	–	5	–	0
$ – Conference champion

The 1923 Virginia Union Panthers football team was an American football team that represented Virginia Union University in the Colored Intercollegiate Athletic Association (CIAA) during the 1923 college football season. In their third and final year under head coach Harold D. Martin, the Panthers compiled an overall record of 5–0–2 with a mark of 5–0 in conference play, winning the CIAA championship. The Panthers were selected by the Pittsburgh Courier as the black college national champion. The team played its home games at Hovey Field in Richmond, Virginia.

Key players included fullback Al Fentress and halfbacks Julius Martin and Leroy Williams. Guard Miller was the only Virginia Union player to receive first-team honors on the 1923 All-CIAA football team selected by committee of the Colored Intercollegiate Athletic Association.

== Schedule ==
Date	Time	Opponent	Site	Result	Attendance	Source
October 13		Adelphi Social Club*	Hovey Field; Richmond, VA	T 0–0	1,000	
October 20		at Virginia Seminary	Lynchburg, VA	W 24–0		
October 26	3:30 p.m.	at Shaw	Shaw athletic field; Raleigh, NC	W 6–0	2,000	
November 10		at Atlanta*	Atlanta, GA	T 0–0		
November 17		at Virginia Normal	McKinley Stadium; Petersburg, VA	W 7–0		
November 23		Saint Paul (VA)	Hovey Field; Richmond, VA	W 6–0		
November 28		Hampton	Hovey Field; Richmond, VA	W 7–6	1,500	
*Non-conference game; All times are in Eastern time
