= 1916 Morehouse Maroon Tigers football team =

American college football season

1916 Morehouse Maroon Tigers football

SIAC champion
- Conference: Southern Intercollegiate Athletic Conference
- Record: 6–0 (6–0 SIAC)
- Head coach: B. T. Harvey (1st season)
- Captain: Brock

The 1916 Morehouse Maroon Tigers football team represented Morehouse College as a member of the Southern Intercollegiate Athletic Conference (SIAC) during the 1916 college football season. Led by first-year head coach B. T. Harvey, the Maroon Tigers compiled an overall record of 6–0 with an identical mark in conference play, winning the SIAC title.

== Schedule ==
Date	Time	Opponent	Site	Result	Source
October 21		at Clark (GA)	Clark campus; Atlanta, GA	W 48–0	
October 28		Morris Brown	Atlanta, GA	W 32–0	
November 3		at Talladega	Talladega, AL	W 26–0	
November 11		Tuskegee	Atlanta, GA	W 23–0	
November 18	2:30 p.m.	Atlanta	Atlanta, GA	W 17–10	
November 30	2:00 p.m.	at Fisk	Athletic Park; Nashville, TN	W 14–0	
