= William Pennington Young =

American baseball player (1896–1968)

- Catcher
- Born: October 28, 1896; Orange, New Jersey, U.S.
- Died: November 30, 1968 (aged 72); Harrisburg, Pennsylvania, U.S.
- Threw: Right

Negro league baseball debut
- 1921, for the Homestead Grays

Last appearance
- 1927, for the Homestead Grays

Teams
- As player: Homestead Grays (1921–1922, 1924, 1927); As manager: Cleveland Stars (1932)

William Pennington Young (October 28, 1896 – November 30, 1968), nicknamed "Pep" or "Pimp", was an American Negro league catcher who played for the Homestead Grays in the 1920s.

== Early life and collegiate career ==
Young was born and grew up in Orange, New Jersey and attended Orange High School, where he played football, basketball, and baseball. Young attended Lincoln University, and starred on the school's basketball team with his older brother, Ulysses S. Young.He also played baseball and was named a Negro All-American at quarterback on the Lions' football team. Young graduated in 1917 as class valedictorian.

== Professional sports career ==
Upon graduation, the brothers played professional basketball in Pittsburgh for promoter Cumberland Posey's Loendi Big Five. Young was part of the team when they won four consecutive Colored Basketball World Championships from 1919 through 1923. Young was also signed by the Homestead Grays, also owned by Posey, to play catcher. While playing for the Grays he was known for his unorthodox batting stance. He would go on to manage the Cleveland Stars in 1932.

== Political career and later life ==
After his athletic career, Young worked for Lockhart Iron and Steel Co. in personnel and labor relations. He also became active in Republican Party politics and was appointed the Secretary of Labor and Industry for the Commonwealth of Pennsylvania by Governor William Scranton. As a delegate and floor leader for the 1964 Republican National Convention, Young was one of the organizers of the protest of African American delegates against the nomination of Barry Goldwater. He was attacked during the protest by pro-Goldwater delegates, who lit his suit on fire.

Young died in Harrisburg, Pennsylvania in 1968 at age 72.
