= Louis L. Watson =

American football coach, athletics administrator (1895–1952)

Biographical details
- Born: April 9, 1895; Alexandria, Virginia, U.S.
- Died: July 22, 1952 (aged 57)

Playing career
- 1919–1920: Springfield

Coaching career (HC unless noted)
- 1921–1922: Virginia Normal
- 1923: Howard
- 1925–1927: Howard
- 1928 – c. 1940: Bordentown

Administrative career (AD unless noted)
- c. 1926: Howard
- 1945–?: Howard

Head coaching record
- Overall: 29–8–6 (college)

Accomplishments and honors

Championships
- 3 black college national (1923, 1925–1926)

Louis Lee Watson (April 9, 1895 – July 22, 1952) was an American football coach and college athletics administrator. He served as the head football coach at Virginia Normal and Industrial Institute—now known as Virginia State University–from 1921 to 1922 and at Howard University in 1923 and from 1925 to 1927. Watson graduated from Howard in 1917 and played football at Springfield College in Springfield, Massachusetts in 1919 and 1920.

Watson was born on April 9, 1895, in Alexandria, Virginia. He attended M Street High School in Washington, D.C. before earning a Bachelor of Science degree from Howard in 1917. During World War I, Watson served as an officer in the United States Army at Fort Dix and Camp Lee. He was discharged from military service in 1919 with the rank of captain.

In 1928, Watson began coaching at the Bordentown School in Bordentown, New Jersey. He returned to Howard in 1945 as athletic director.

Watson died on July 22, 1952, following an illness of seven years.

== Head coaching record ==
=== College ===
Year	Team	Overall	Conference	Standing	Bowl/playoffs
Virginia Normal Trojans (Colored Intercollegiate Athletic Association) (1921–1922)
1921	Virginia Normal	2–1–1	0–1	5th	
1922	Virginia Normal	4–4	2–2	T–3rd	
Virginia Normal:		6–5–1	2–3		
Howard Bison (Colored Intercollegiate Athletic Association) (1923)
1923	Howard	7–0–1	3–0–1	2nd	
Howard Bison (Independent) (1925–1927)
1925	Howard	6–0–2			
1926	Howard	7–0			
1927	Howard	3–3–2			
Howard:		23–3–5	3–0–1		
Total:		29–8–6			
National championship Conference title Conference division title or championship game berth
