= Orange High School (New Jersey) =

High school in Essex County, New Jersey, US

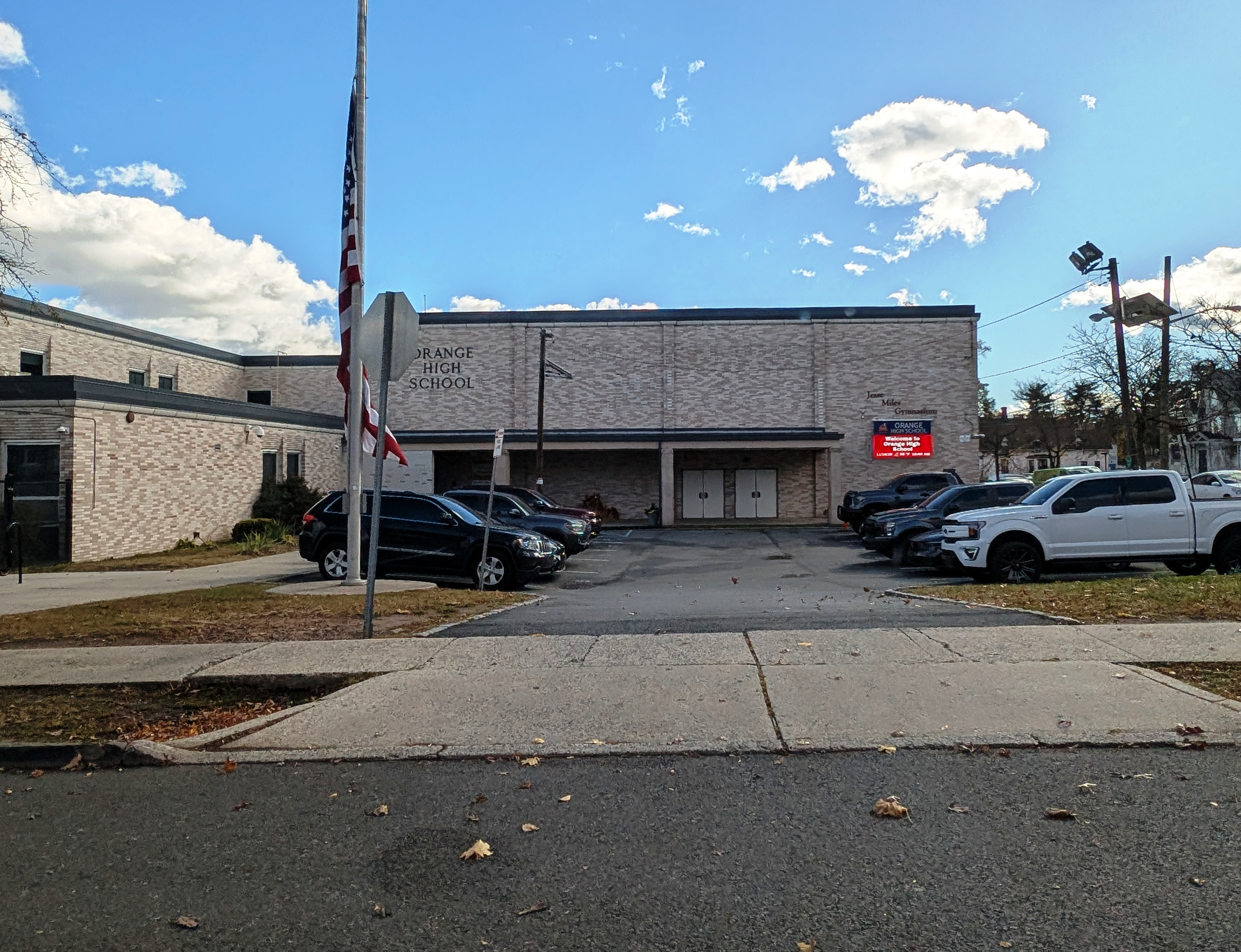

Location
- 400 Lincoln Avenue; Orange, Essex County, New Jersey 07050; United States; 40°45′56″N 74°14′21″W

Information
- Type: Public high school
- Established: 1869
- School district: Orange Board of Education
- NCES School ID: 341227002396
- Principal: Jason Belton
- Faculty: 83.5 FTEs
- Grades: 9-12
- Enrollment: 1,370 (as of 2023–24)
- Student to teacher ratio: 16.4:1
- Colors: Orange and Black
- Athletics conference: Super Essex Conference (general); North Jersey Super Football Conference (football)
- Team name: Tornadoes
- Accreditation: Middle States Association of Colleges and Schools
- Newspaper: Tornado
- Website: ohs.orange.k12.nj.us

Orange High School is a four-year comprehensive public high school that serves students in ninth through twelfth grades from Orange in Essex County, in the U.S. state of New Jersey, operating as part of the Orange Board of Education. The school has been accredited by the Middle States Association of Colleges and Schools Commission on Elementary and Secondary Schools since 1928.

As of the 2023–24 school year, the school had an enrollment of 1,370 students and 83.5 classroom teachers (on an FTE basis), for a student–teacher ratio of 16.4:1. There were 788 students (57.5% of enrollment) eligible for free lunch and none eligible for reduced-cost lunch.

== Awards, recognition and rankings ==
The school was the 305th-ranked public high school in New Jersey out of 339 schools statewide in New Jersey Monthly magazine's September 2014 cover story on the state's "Top Public High Schools", using a new ranking methodology. The school had been ranked 232nd in the state of 328 schools in 2012, after being ranked 315th in 2010 out of 322 schools listed. The magazine ranked the school 308th in 2008 out of 316 schools. The school was ranked 276th in the magazine's September 2006 issue, which surveyed 316 schools across the state.

== History ==
The current building housing Orange High School is the fourth site used for the school, in three different parts of the city. The first, dedicated on September 13, 1869, was located next to the First Church of Orange (Presbyterian). The second site was located at Main and Cleveland Streets. The third is now being used as Orange Middle School. The fourth, and current site, was dedicated on October 7, 1973, after opening to students on September 5 of that year.

== Athletics ==
The Orange High School Tornadoes compete in the Super Essex Conference, which is comprised of public and private high schools in Essex County and was established following a reorganization of sports leagues in Northern New Jersey by the New Jersey State Interscholastic Athletic Association (NJSIAA). Prior to the 2010 realignment, the school had been in the Skyline Division of the Northern Hills Conference, an athletic conference that included schools in Essex, Morris and Passaic counties. With 941 students in grades 10-12, the school was classified by the NJSIAA for the 2019–20 school year as Group III for most athletic competition purposes, which included schools with an enrollment of 761 to 1,058 students in that grade range. The football team competes in the Freedom White division of the North Jersey Super Football Conference, which includes 112 schools competing in 20 divisions, making it the nation's biggest football-only high school sports league. The school was classified by the NJSIAA as Group IV North for football for 2024–2026, which included schools with 893 to 1,315 students. The school colors are orange and black.

The boys' basketball team won the Group IV state championship in 1948 (vs. Atlantic City High School), in Group III in 1968 (vs. Emerson High School) and 1994 (vs. Camden High School), in Group II in 1977 (vs. Pleasantville High School), 1979 (vs. Pleasantville) and 1988 (vs. Delran High School), and in Group I in 1974 (vs. Burlington Township High School) and 1976 (vs. Glassboro High School); the eight state titles are tied for third-most among public school programs. The team won the Group IV title in 1948 with a 47-31 win against Atlantic City in the championship game after starting the game with a 14-0 run. Coached by Hoddy Mahon, the 1968 team finished the season with a record of 27-0 after winning the Group III state title with a 64-56 win against Emerson in the championship game played in front of a crowd of nearly 7,000 at Atlantic City's Convention Hall. The 1976 team held off a late rally from Glassboro to win the Group I title by a score of 82-77 and finish the season with a record of 25-7. The 1977 team finished the season with a 26-3 record after winning the Group II title by defeating Pleasantville by a score of 76-65 in the championship game. The 1994 team held off a late charge to win the Group III title with a 65-63 win against Camden in the playoff finals and moved on to capture the Tournament of Champions to finish the season with a 25-3 record, winning by a score of 73-62 over sixth-seeded Glassboro High School in the quarterfinals, against number-two seed Bergen Catholic High School by 88-57 in the semis and won vs. top-seeded Paterson Catholic High School in the championship game by 64-56, giving the Tornadoes a No. 1 ranking in NJ, and national rank of No. 11 in USA Today.

== Music ==
Orange High School is home to the Mighty Marching Tornadoes marching band and a choir, Voices in Harmony, in addition to local musical rap group that wrote a song about an Orange High School teacher.

== Administration ==
The school's principal is Jason Belton. His administration team includes three assistant principals.

== Notable alumni ==
- Jay Alford (born 1983), former defensive tackle for the New York Giants drafted in the 3rd Round of the 2007 NFL draft (81st overall)
- Cory Boyd (born 1985), running back for the Edmonton Eskimos
- Richard Codey (1946–2026), politician who served as the 53rd governor of New Jersey from 2004 to 2006
- Pete D'Alonzo (1929–2001), fullback who played in the NFL for the Detroit Lions
- Wayne Dickens, former American football player and coach who was head football coach at Kentucky State University from 2009 to 2012 and The College of New Jersey from 2013 to 2015
- Edward V. Hartford (1870–1922), founder and President of the Hartford Suspension Company who perfected the automobile shock absorber
- Beatrice Hicks (1919–1979, class of 1935), founder of the Society of Women Engineers in 1950
- Cleo Hill Jr. (born 1966, class of 1984), basketball coach who has been head coach of the Maryland Eastern Shore Hawks men's basketball team
- Cal Irvin (1924–2017, class of 1942) was an American Negro league baseball shortstop and college basketball coach
- Monte Irvin (1919–2016), American left and right fielder in the Negro leagues and Major League Baseball
- Carolyn Plaskett (1917–2001, class of 1934), American-born illustrator, international scholar and former first lady of Barbados
- Sam Seale (born 1962), former American football cornerback who played ten seasons in the National Football League, mainly for the Los Angeles Raiders
- Jamar Summers (born 1995), American football cornerback
- Charles V. Webb Jr. (1910–2010), politician who served as prosecutor of Essex County, New Jersey
- Khalil Wheeler-Weaver (born 1996, class of 2014), convicted serial killer
- William Pennington Young (1896–1968), Negro league baseball catcher who played for the Homestead Grays in the 1920s

== Notable faculty ==
- Heinie Benkert (1901-1972), football player and coach; he taught history and coached football at Orange High School until 1971
