= 1923 Lincoln Lions football team =

American college football season

1923 Lincoln Lions football

Black college national co-champion
- Conference: Colored Intercollegiate Athletic Association
- Record: 5–1–2 (1–1–2 CIAA)
- Head coach: Ulysses S. Young (1st season)
- Captain: Robert Walter Johnson

1923 Colored Intercollegiate Athletic Association football standings
	Conf.					Overall
Team	W		L		T	W		L		T
Virginia Union $	5	–	0	–	0	5	–	0	–	2
Howard	3	–	0	–	1	7	–	0	–	1
Hampton	4	–	2	–	0	5	–	2	–	0
Virginia Normal	3	–	3	–	0	4	–	3	–	0
Lincoln (PA)	1	–	1	–	2	5	–	1	–	2
Saint Paul (VA)	2	–	3	–	1	6	–	3	–	1
Virginia Seminary	1	–	4	–	0	3	–	6	–	0
Shaw	0	–	5	–	0	0	–	5	–	0
$ – Conference champion

The 1923 Lincoln Lions football team was an American football team that represented Lincoln University in the Colored Intercollegiate Athletic Association (CIAA) during the 1923 college football season. In their first year under head coach Ulysses S. Young, the Lions compiled a 5–1–2 record and were recognized as the black college national co-champion along with Howard.

The championship game between Howard and Lincoln attracted 25,000 spectators, "the largest crowd in the history of colored football" to that time.

The team's players included quarterback Jazz Byrd, left halfback and team captain Robert Walter Johnson (nicknamed "Whirlwind), right halfback "Butts" Brown, fullback Lee, ends J. W. Lancaster and "Birdie" Crudup, tackles W. R. C. Coston and R. S. Jason, guards Poindexter and Parker, and center Chris "Big Boy" Morgan. Lincoln captured five of eleven first-team spots on the 1923 All-C.I.A.A. football team selected by committee of the Colored Intercollegiate Athletic Association. Lincoln's first-team honorees were Byrd at quarterback, R. W. Johnson at left halfback, Chris Morgan at center, and J. W. Lancaster in the line.

== Schedule ==
Date	Time	Opponent	Site	Result	Attendance	Source
October 6		Bordentown*	Rendall Field; Lincoln University, PA	W 53–0	500	
October 13		Harrisburg "Y"*	Lincoln University, PA	W 20–0		
October 20		Morgan*	Lincoln University, PA	W 69–0		
October 27		at West Virginia Collegiate*	Charleston, WV	W 7–0	7,000	
November 3		vs. Hampton	Black Sox ball park; Baltimore, MD	L 3–7	4,000	
November 10		Saint Paul (VA) (Note: Saint Paul's College (Virginia) was officially known at this time as the St. Paul Normal and Industrial School, located in Lynchburg, Virginia.)	Rendall Field; Lincoln University, PA	T 3–3	2,000	
November 19		vs. Shaw	League Park; Norfolk, VA	W 48–0	4,000	
November 29	2:00 p.m.	vs. Howard	National League Park; Philadelphia, PA	T 6–6	25,000	
*Non-conference game; All times are in Eastern time
