= Harold D. Martin =

American football coach and baseball player (1899–1945)

Biographical details
- Born: April 14, 1899; Boston, Massachusetts, U.S.
- Died: March 23, 1945 (aged 45) near Reidsville, North Carolina, U.S.
- Education: Norwich University, 1916-1920

Playing career

Football
- 1916–1919: Norwich

Baseball
- 1921: Pittsburgh Keystones
- Position: Third baseman (baseball)

Coaching career (HC unless noted)

Football
- 1921–1923: Virginia Union
- 1924–1926: Shaw
- 1927–1932: Virginia Normal/State

Basketball
- 1924–1927: Shaw

Baseball
- 1922–1924: Virginia Union

Administrative career (AD unless noted)
- 1921–1924: Virginia Union
- 1924–1927: Shaw

Head coaching record
- Overall: 62–22–13 (football)

Accomplishments and honors

Championships
- Football; 4 CIAA (1921, 1923, 1929, 1931) Basketball; 1 CIAA (1927) Baseball; 2 CIAA (1922, 1924) Tennis; 2 CIAA (1926)

Harold Douglas "Doc" Martin (April 14, 1899 – March 23, 1945) was an American college football player and coach, and a Negro league baseball player. Martin served as the head football coach at Virginia Union University from 1921 to 1923, Shaw University from 1924 to 1926, and Virginia State University from 1927 to 1932, compiling a career a college football coaching record of 63–22–12.

== Biography ==
Martin began his playing career in 1916 when he became the first African American cadet in the history of Norwich University in Northfield, Vermont.

Martin lettered in football, baseball, ice hockey, and track at Norwich. He later earned a master's degree at New York University and taught at Miner Teachers College—now known as the University of the District of Columbia. Martin was appointed the athletic director at Virginia Union University in 1921. He moved to Shaw University in 1924 as athletic director.

Martin was called into active military duty in 1942, serving as a major in the United States Army. He served as the director of the Ground School for the Tuskegee airmen in March 1943, where he would serve until his death in 1945. Thanks in part to Martin's training, the Tuskegee Airmen became the elite unit they are known as today.

Shortly before the end of the war, Martin would die in an aircraft crash, on March 23, 1945, near Reidsville, North Carolina. Martin is buried at Arlington National Cemetery in Arlington, Virginia.

== Time at Norwich ==
At Norwich University, Martin was the first black student to attend the University. He was a star football player, a hockey captain, a member of the baseball team, and a member of the student council. Martin gained respect among his peers, being elected as a captain to multiple teams.

While at Norwich, he is believed to have been the first black collegiate hockey player in the United States, just one of various firsts that he would accomplish through his life. He was the first black member of the Norwich University Athletic Hall of Fame, and just one of two members from his graduating class to be included.

A widely loved student, at Norwich many took inspiration from Martin and respected him as a member of various clubs and student organizations on campus. His time at Norwich left a mark on the University as they established the Harold "Doc" Martin '20 Memorial Scholarship to assist minority students with paying for college while at Norwich. Beyond that, Norwich established the Harold "Doc" Martin Society to promote acceptance, inclusivity, and diversity on campus.

== Head coaching record ==
=== Football ===
| Year | Team | Overall | Conference | Standing | Bowl/playoffs |
|---|---|---|---|---|---|
Virginia Union Panthers (Colored Intercollegiate Athletic Association) (1921–1923)
| 1921 | Virginia Union | 6–0–2 | 3–0 | 1st | |
| 1922 | Virginia Union | 5–2 | 3–1 | 2nd | |
| 1923 | Virginia Union | 5–0–2 | 5–0 | 1st | |
| Virginia Union: | | 16–2–4 | 11–1 | | |
Shaw Bears (Colored Intercollegiate Athletic Association) (1924–1926)
| 1924 | Shaw | 1–2–2 | 1–2–1 | 6th | |
| 1925 | Shaw | 2–2–3 | 1–2–3 | 5th | |
| 1926 | Shaw | 1–7 | 0–7 | 8th | |
| Shaw: | | 4–11–5 | 2–11–4 | | |
Virginia Normal/State Trojans (Colored Intercollegiate Athletic Association) (1927–1932)
| 1927 | Virginia Normal | 6–3 | 2–4 | 5th | |
| 1928 | Virginia State | 9–1 | 7–1 | 2nd | |
| 1929 | Virginia State | 9–0 | 7–0 | 1st | |
| 1930 | Virginia State | 4–3–2 | 4–1–2 | 3rd | |
| 1931 | Virginia State | 8–0–1 | 6–0–1 | T–1st | |
| 1932 | Virginia State | 6–2–1 | 6–1–1 | T–2nd | |
| Virginia Normal/State: | | 42–9–4 | 32–7–4 | | |
| Total: | | 62–22–13 | | | |
