= B. T. Harvey =

American sports coach, athletics administrator, professor (1892–1971)

Biographical details
- Born: July 18, 1892; Griffin, Georgia, U.S.
- Died: October 15, 1971 (aged 79); Atlanta, Georgia, U.S.

Coaching career (HC unless noted)

Football
- 1916–1925: Morehouse
- 1927–1928: Morehouse

Basketball
- 1916–1929: Morehouse

Baseball
- 1917–1929: Morehouse

Administrative career (AD unless noted)
- 1916–1929: Morehouse
- c. 1925–1967: SIAC (commissioner)

Head coaching record
- Overall: 56–23–6 (football); 112–45–3 (baseball)

Accomplishments and honors

Championships
- Football; 5 SIAC (1916, 1920–1923)

Burwell Towns Harvey Jr. (July 18, 1892 – October 15, 1971) was an American college football, college basketball, and college baseball coach, athletics administrator, and college professor. He served two stints as the head football coach at Morehouse College in Atlanta, from 1916 to 1925 and 1927 to 1928, compiling a record of 56–23–6.

Harvey was born in 1892, in Griffin, Georgia, and grew up in Peru, Indiana and Lakewood, New Jersey. He graduated from Colgate University, and earned a master's degree from Columbia University. Harvey went to Morehouse in 1916 to teach chemistry and physics. In addition to football, he also coached baseball and basketball at Morehouse before stepping down from coaching in 1929. Harvey's football teams at Morehouse won five Southern Intercollegiate Athletic Conference (SIAC) champions, and his basketball squads won ten consecutive SIAC titles. He was the head of the chemistry department at Morehouse until 1957, when he left the school after 41 years to teach at Alabama State College—now known as Alabama State University. In 1962, he moved on to teach at Miles College in Fairfield, Alabama. Harvey served as commissioner of the SIAC for more than 40 years, until he was succeeded in 1967 by W. S. M. Banks.

Harvey died on October 15, 1971, in Atlanta. B. T. Harvey Stadium, Morehouse's football stadium, which was completed in 1983, is named for him.

== Head coaching record ==
=== Football ===
Year	Team	Overall	Conference	Standing	Bowl/playoffs
Morehouse Maroon Tigers (Southern Intercollegiate Athletic Conference) (1916–1925)
1916	Morehouse	6–0	6–0	1st	
1917	Morehouse	3–1			
1918	Morehouse	1–2			
1919	Morehouse	6–1			
1920	Morehouse	5–1	4–0	1st	
1921	Morehouse	6–0	4–0	1st	
1922	Morehouse	5–2	4–1	1st	
1923	Morehouse	6–2–1	5–1	T–1st	
1924	Morehouse	5–3–1			
1925	Morehouse	5–1–2			
Morehouse Maroon Tigers (Southern Intercollegiate Athletic Conference) (1927–1928)
1927	Morehouse	5–5–1	3–5	6th	
1928	Morehouse	3–5–1	2–3	8th	
Morehouse:		56–23–6			
Total:		56–23–6			
National championship Conference title Conference division title or championship game berth
