= Orange Board of Education =

School district in Essex County, New Jersey, US

Address
- 451 Lincoln Avenue Orange, Essex County, New Jersey, 07050; United States
- Coordinates: 40.76317°N 74.242925°W

District information
- Grades: PreK-12
- Superintendent: Gerald Fitzhugh II
- Business administrator: Jason E. Ballard
- Schools: 12
- Affiliation(s): Former Abbott district

Students and staff
- Enrollment: 5,629 (as of 2020–21)
- Faculty: 507.5 FTEs
- Student–teacher ratio: 11.1:1

Other information
- District Factor Group: A
- Website: www.orange.k12.nj.us
Ind.	Per pupil	District spending	Rank (*)	K-12 average	%± vs. average
1A	Total Spending	$20,821	84	$18,891	10.2%
1	Budgetary Cost	16,573	86	14,783	12.1%
2	Classroom Instruction	9,659	85	8,763	10.2%
6	Support Services	2,998	90	2,392	25.3%
8	Administrative Cost	1,892	101	1,485	27.4%
10	Operations & Maintenance	1,714	58	1,783	−3.9%
13	Extracurricular Activities	239	49	268	−10.8%
16	Median Teacher Salary	54,617	7	64,043
Data from NJDoE 2014 Taxpayers' Guide to Education Spending. *Of K-12 districts with more than 3,500 students. Lowest spending=1; Highest=103

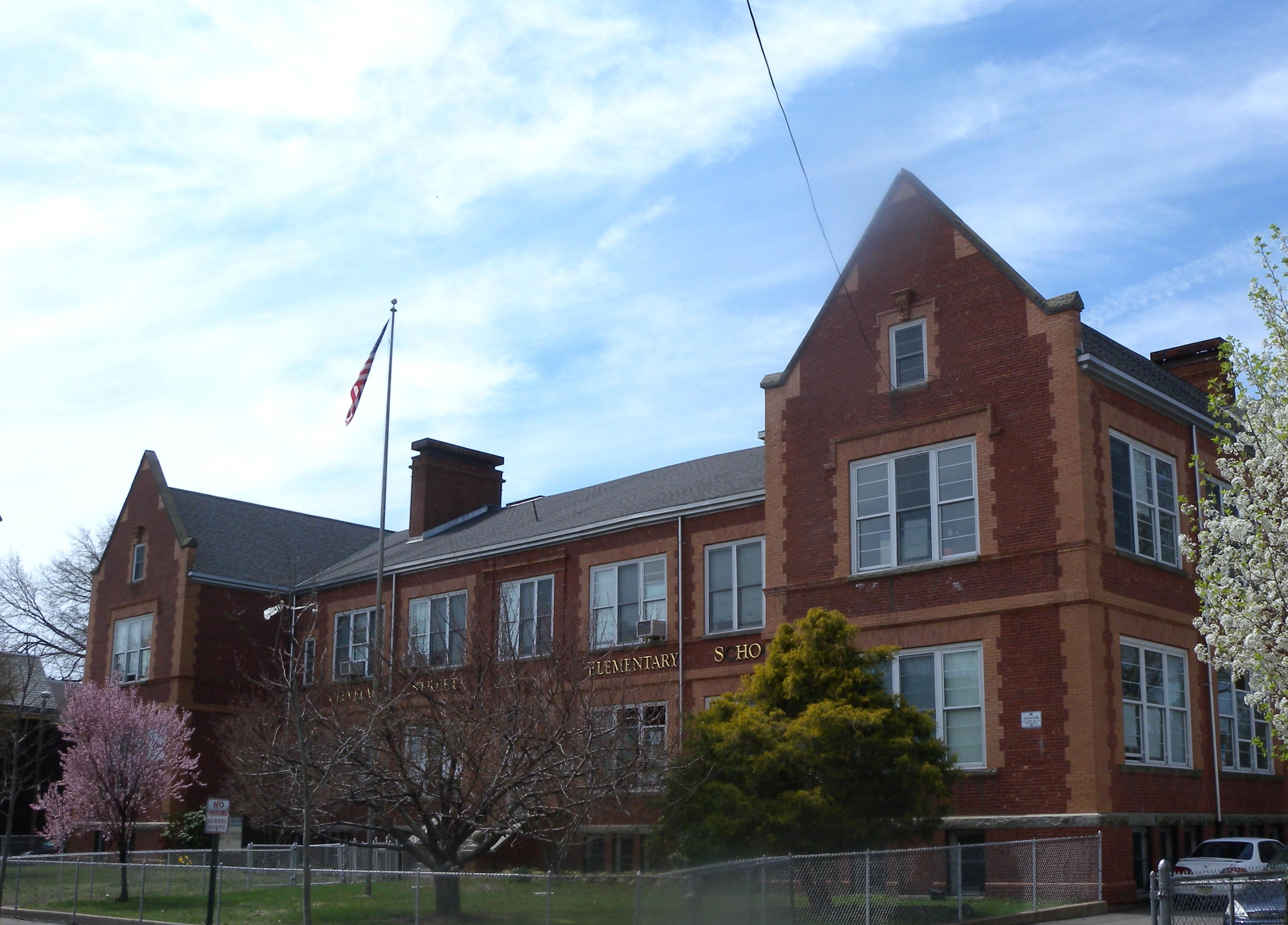
Cleveland Street school

Orange Board of Education is a comprehensive community public school district that is headquartered in the city of Orange, in Essex County, in the U.S. state of New Jersey, and serves students in pre-kindergarten through twelfth grade. The district is one of 31 former Abbott districts statewide that were established pursuant to the decision by the New Jersey Supreme Court in Abbott v. Burke which are now referred to as "SDA Districts" based on the requirement for the state to cover all costs for school building and renovation projects in these districts under the supervision of the New Jersey Schools Development Authority. The district was considered high performing as per the New Jersey Department of Education having achieved 80% and above on all indicators within the NJQSAC evaluation in June 2020.

As of the 2020–21 school year, the district, comprised of 12 schools, had an enrollment of 5,629 students and 507.5 classroom teachers (on an FTE basis), for a student–teacher ratio of 11.1:1.

The district is classified by the New Jersey Department of Education as being in District Factor Group "A", the lowest of eight groupings. District Factor Groups organize districts statewide to allow comparison by common socioeconomic characteristics of the local districts. From lowest socioeconomic status to highest, the categories are A, B, CD, DE, FG, GH, I and J.

== History ==
In 1948 the district had a racially integrated school system with an open enrollment school system in which families could choose which schools their children could attend. In 1948 one predominately African-American school had five teachers deemed "colored".

== Schools ==
Schools in the district (with 2020–21 enrollment data from the National Center for Education Statistics) are:

Preschool

- Orange Early Childhood Center (188; in PreK)
- John Robert Lewis Early Childhood Center (NA; Pre-K)
  - Cayce Cummins, principal

Elementary Schools

- Central Elementary School (319; K-2)
  - Denise White, principal
- Cleveland Street School (303; K-7)
  - Robert Pettit, principal
- Forest Street Community School (410; PreK-7)
  - Yancisca Loften-Cooke, principal
- Heywood Avenue School (355; PreK-7)
  - Dion Patterson, principal
- Lincoln Avenue School (708; K-7)
  - Frank Iannucci, principal
- Oakwood Avenue Community School (425; PreK-7)
  - Dana Gaines, principal
- Park Avenue School (569; K-7)
  - Myron Hackett, principal
- Rosa Parks Central Community School (999; Grades 3–7 - formerly Main Street School and Central School)
  - Debra Joseph-Charles, principal
- Scholars Academy (NA)
  - Karen Machuca, principal

Middle School (Secondary)

- Orange Preparatory Academy (679; 8–9, formerly Orange Middle School)
  - Carrie Halstead, principal

High Schools (Secondary)

- Orange High School (840; 10–12)
  - Jason Belton, principal
- STEM Innovation Academy of the Oranges (160; 9–12)
  - Devonii Reid, principal

== Administration ==
Core members of the district's administration are:

- Gerald Fitzhugh II, superintendent
- Jason E. Ballard, board secretary and school business administrator

== Board of education ==
The district's board of education, composed of nine members, sets policy and oversees the fiscal and educational operation of the district through its administration. Since November 2017, it is a Type II school district, in which the board's trustees are elected directly by voters to serve three-year terms of office on a staggered basis, with three seats up for election each year held (since 2018) as part of the November general election. The board appoints a superintendent to oversee the district's day-to-day operations and a business administrator to supervise the business functions of the district. In November 2016, voters approved the change from a Type I district, in which the board is appointed by the mayor, to a Type II district, in which residents vote for board members. In November 2017, the first election for the elected board took place.
