= Ulysses S. Young =

American football, basketball, and baseball coach and college athletics administrator

Biographical details
- Born: May 28, 1894; Southampton County, Virginia, U.S.
- Died: April 22, 1927 (aged 32); Baltimore, Maryland, U.S.

Playing career

Football
- c. 1915: Lincoln (PA)

Basketball
- c. 1915: Lincoln (PA)

Baseball
- c. 1915: Lincoln (PA)

Coaching career (HC unless noted)

Football
- 1923–1926: Lincoln (PA)

Administrative career (AD unless noted)
- 1923–1927: Lincoln (PA)

Head coaching record
- Overall: 21–5–6 (football)

Accomplishments and honors

Championships
- 2 black college national (1923–1924); 1 CIAA (1924)

Ulysses Simpson "Lissy" Young Jr. (May 28, 1894 – April 22, 1927) was an American football, basketball, and baseball coach and college athletics administrator. He served as head football coach at Lincoln University in Pennsylvania from 1923 to 1926, compiling a record of 21–5–6. A native of Orange, New Jersey, Young played football, basketball, and baseball at Lincoln, before graduating in 1917. He played all three sports alongside his younger brother, William Pennington Young, who also graduated in 1917.

Young was the athletic supervisor for colored schools in Evansville, Indiana before succeededing James H. Law as athletic director at Lincoln in 1923. He also coached basketball and baseball at Lincoln. Young died on April 22, 1927, following an operation at Johns Hopkins Hospital in Baltimore, Maryland.

== Head coaching record ==
| Year | Team | Overall | Conference | Standing | Bowl/playoffs |
|---|---|---|---|---|---|
Lincoln Lions (Colored Intercollegiate Athletic Association) (1923–1924)
| 1923 | Lincoln | 5–1–2 | 1–1–2 | T–4th | |
| 1924 | Lincoln | 8–0–1 | 5–0–1 | 1st | |
Lincoln Lions (Independent) (1925–1926)
| 1925 | Lincoln | 4–1–2 | | | |
| 1926 | Lincoln | 4–3–1 | | | |
| Lincoln: | | 21–5–6 | 6–1–3 | | |
| Total: | | 21–5–6 | | | |
National championship Conference title Conference division title or championship game berth
