= 1922 Morehouse Maroon Tigers football team =

American college football season

1922 Morehouse Maroon Tigers football

SIAC champion
- Conference: Southern Intercollegiate Athletic Conference
- Record: 5–2 (4–1 SIAC)
- Head coach: B. T. Harvey (7th season)
- Captains: Caesar Felton Gayles; Charles Kelly
- Home stadium: Morehouse athletic field

The 1922 Morehouse Maroon Tigers football team represented Morehouse College as a member of the Southern Intercollegiate Athletic Conference (SIAC) during the 1922 college football season. Led by seventh-year head coach B. T. Harvey, the Maroon Tigers compiled an overall record of 5–2 with a mark of 4–1 in conference play, winning the SIAC title. Harvey was assisted by C. E. Warner. Caesar Felton Gayles and Charles Kelly served as team captains.

== Schedule ==
Date	Time	Opponent	Site	Result	Attendance	Source
October 14	2:30 p.m.	Livingstone*	Morehouse athletic field; Atlanta, GA	W 13–0		
October 21		at Tuskegee	Tuskegee, AL	W 40–0	3,000	
October 28	2:30 p.m.	Morris Brown	Morehouse athletic field; Atlanta, GA	W 58–13	5,000	
November 6		vs. Virginia Union*	League Park; Norfolk, VA	L 0–19	4,000	
November 11	2:30 p.m.	Talladega	Morehouse athletic field; Atlanta, GA	W 18–6		
November 24		at Knoxville	Knoxville College athletic field; Knoxville, TN	W 25–0		
November 30	2:00 p.m.	Fisk	Morehouse athletic field; Atlanta, GA	L 19–20	8,000	
*Non-conference game; All times are in Eastern time
