= 1924 Lincoln Lions football team =

American college football season

1924 Lincoln Lions football

Black college national co-champion CIAA champion
- Conference: Colored Intercollegiate Athletic Association
- Record: 7–0–1 (5–0–1 CIAA)
- Head coach: Ulysses S. Young (2nd season)
- Captain: Byrd D. Crudup
- Home stadium: Rendell Field

1924 Colored Intercollegiate Athletic Association football standings
	Conf.					Overall
Team	W		L		T	W		L		T
Lincoln (PA) $	5	–	0	–	1	7	–	0	–	1
Virginia Union	3	–	1	–	2	4	–	1	–	3
Hampton	3	–	3	–	1	4	–	3	–	1
Virginia Normal	1	–	2	–	3	5	–	3	–	3
Virginia Seminary	2	–	3	–	0	4	–	4	–	0
Shaw	1	–	2	–	1	1	–	2	–	2
Howard	1	–	1	–	1	2	–	1	–	3
Saint Paul (VA)	0	–	4	–	1	4	–	4	–	2
$ – Conference champion

The 1924 Lincoln Lions football team was an American football team that represented Lincoln University in the Colored Intercollegiate Athletic Association (CIAA) during the 1924 college football season. In their second year under head coach Ulysses S. Young, the Lions compiled a 7–0–1 record (5–0–1 against CIAA opponents), won the CIAA championship, shut out eight of nine opponents, and outscored all opponents by a total of 239 to 3.

Key players included halfback Jazz Byrd, fullback Tommy Lee, and Bryd D. "Beno" Crudup, the team captain and right end.

== Schedule ==
Date	Time	Opponent	Site	Result	Attendance	Source
October 4		at Bordentown* (Note: The Philadelphia Inquirer referred to the opponent as the "Bordentown Industrial Institute", which appears to be the "Manual Training and Industrial School for Colored Youth", later known as Bordentown School. The Pittsburgh Courier, on the other hand, identified the opponent as the "Ironsides Eleven" from Bordentown.)	Bordentown, NJ	W 46–0		
October 11		Newark (DE) Giants* (Note: Lincoln was originally scheduled to play the Harrisburg Warriors on October 11. Harrisburg was "could not entertain" the game, and Lincoln's manager, Archer, arranged a last-minute game with "the Newark, Delaware Giants, a plucky team.")	Rendall Field; Lincoln University, PA	W 65–0		
October 18		at Virginia Seminary	Lynchburg, VA	W 21–0	2,000	
October 27	3:00 p.m.	vs. Virginia Union	League Park; Norfolk, VA	T 0–0	2,000	
November 1		vs. Hampton	Baker Bowl; Philadelphia, PA	W 7–3	2,700–5,000	
November 8		vs. Saint Paul (VA)	Black Sox Park; Baltimore, MD	W 33–0		
November 15		Shaw	Rendall Field; Lincoln University, PA	W 36–0	750	
November 27	2:00 p.m.	at Howard	Griffith Stadium; Washington, DC	W 31–0	15,000	
*Non-conference game; All times are in Eastern time
