= Jay Alford =

American gridiron football player (born 1983)

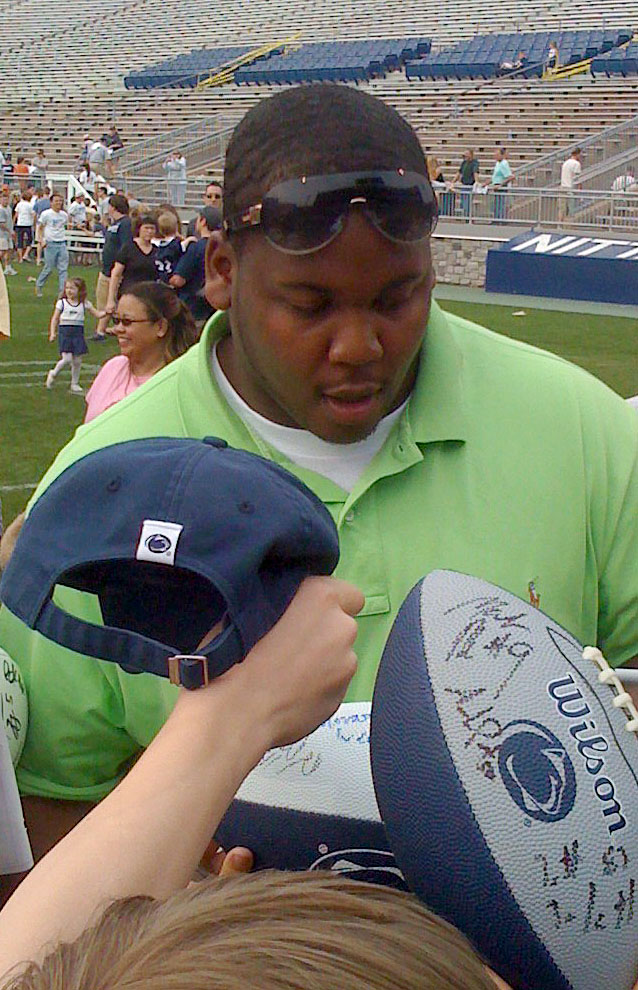
- Alford signing autographs at Penn State in 2008

No. 93, 94, 91
- Position: Defensive tackle

Personal information
- Born: May 28, 1983 (age 43); Orange, New Jersey, U.S.
- Listed height: 6 ft 3 in (1.91 m)
- Listed weight: 304 lb (138 kg)

Career information
- High school: Orange
- College: Penn State
- NFL draft: 2007: 3rd round, 81st overall pick

Career history
- New York Giants (2007–2009); Oakland Raiders (2010); Seattle Seahawks (2011)*; Virginia Destroyers (2011); Saskatchewan Roughriders (2012–2013)
- * Offseason or practice squad member only

Awards and highlights
- Super Bowl champion (XLII); UFL champion (2011); Third-team All-American (2006); 2× Second-team All-Big Ten (2005, 2006)

Career NFL statistics
- Total tackles: 18
- Sacks: 3.5
- Pass deflections: 1
- Stats at Pro Football Reference
- Stats at CFL.ca (archive)

Jason Jamaal Alford (born May 28, 1983) is an American former professional football player who was a defensive tackle in the National Football League (NFL). He played college football for the Penn State Nittany Lions and was selected by the New York Giants in the third round of the 2007 NFL draft.

Alford was also a member of the Oakland Raiders, Seattle Seahawks, Virginia Destroyers, and Saskatchewan Roughriders. In 2007, Alford served as the Giants' long snapper during field goal attempts, due to a season-ending injury to Ryan Kuehl. Alford won Super Bowl XLII in his first season, sacking Tom Brady in the final minute of the Giants' 17–14 win over the New England Patriots.

== Early life ==
Alford attended Orange High School about 30 minutes from Giants Stadium. He was a three-year starter who was selected First-team All-State, U.S. Army All-American and was listed among the G&W Recruiting Report Top 50 defensive players in the nation.

== College career ==
Alford was a four-year starter for the Nittany Lions. He played in 46 games with 41 starts for the Nittany Lions and recorded 118 tackles (60 solo), 32 tackles for losses and 19 sacks. He also recovered four fumbles, forced three fumbles, deflected 12 passes and registered three quarterback pressures. He was named Third-team All-America selection by the Associated Press and was All-Big Ten selection as a junior and senior. Alford finished his senior season with 32 tackles and eight sacks. Alford earned a Bachelor of Arts in Integrative Arts from Penn State in 2006. He was selected for Penn State's Jim O’Hora Award which honors the defense's most improved player each season.

== Professional career ==
Pre-draft measurables
Height	Weight	40-yard dash	10-yard split	20-yard split	20-yard shuttle	Three-cone drill	Vertical jump	Broad jump	Bench press
6 ft 3 3/8 in (1.91 m)	304 lb (138 kg)	5.19 s	1.86 s	3.01 s	4.83 s	7.81 s	25 1/2 in (0.65 m)	8 ft 7 in (2.62 m)	24 reps
Bench press from Pro Day, all other values from NFL Combine.

=== New York Giants ===
Alford's most memorable moment with the Giants was a devastating sack of Tom Brady in Super Bowl XLII. With less than one minute remaining in the game and the New England Patriots down 17–14 with possession of the ball, Alford sacked Brady resulting in a 3rd and 20 situation. The Giants went on to shock the previously undefeated Patriots 17–14 in what's widely considered one of the greatest upsets in Super Bowl history. As a rookie in 2007, Alford played in all 16 regular season games and all 4 postseason games. He was the snapper for field goals and extra points all season. He finished with 8 tackles (1 solo), 1 sack, 5 quarterback hurries and 2 quarterback hits. In 2008, he played in all 16 regular season games with 3 starts and played in the NFC Divisional Playoff game vs. Philadelphia. He finished with 26 tackles (9 solo), 2.5 sacks, 3 tackles for losses, 4 quarterback hurries, 7 quarterback hits, and 1 pass defensed. Alford missed the 2009 NFL season after he tore his MCL and partially tore his ACL in the preseason. He was waived on September 4, 2010.

=== Oakland Raiders ===
On September 8, 2010, Alford signed with the Oakland Raiders. He was waived on October 6.

=== Seattle Seahawks ===
He then spent the following offseason with the Seattle Seahawks, but did not make the final roster.

=== Virginia Destroyers ===
Alford signed with the Virginia Destroyers of the UFL. It was the Destroyers' inaugural season in the UFL, and Alford helped lead them to a victory in the 2011 UFL Championship Game over the two-time defending champion Las Vegas Locos. The win gives Alford a championship in both the NFL and UFL.

=== Saskatchewan Roughriders ===
Alford signed with the Saskatchewan Roughriders of the Canadian Football League on June 17, 2012.

Alford was cut June 25, 2012 in training camp, but was re-signed on August 7, 2012. He played in 10 regular season games for the Roughriders during the 2012 season, making 11 tackles and two sacks.

He was released by the team on May 23, 2013.

== Personal life ==
Alford was born in Orange, New Jersey and raised by his grandmother. He was a standout player at Orange High School, where he was named All-State, a U.S. Army All-American, and was listed among the G&W Recruiting Report Top 50 defensive players in the nation. Alford also was named to the Prep Star Dream Team.

On February 29, 2008, Alford was awarded the City of Orange Township's Key to the City.
