= Carolyn Plaskett =

- Born: Carolyn Marie Plasket; January 31, 1917; Orange, New Jersey, U.S.
- Died: November 11, 2001 (aged 84); Barbados
- Occupation: First Lady of Barbados

Newspaper article highlighting the 'First Lady of Barbados', Carolyn Plaskett.

Carolyn Marie Plasket Barrow (January 31, 1917 – November 11, 2001), also known as Carolyn Plaskett, was an American-born illustrator, international scholar, and the wife of the then Prime Minister of Barbados. She was born in Orange, New Jersey, and was the only child of her parents, Reverend Dr. George Plaskett and Carrie Davenport Plaskett. Plaskett was married to the first Prime Minister of Barbados, Errol Walton Barrow, who successfully brought Barbados its independence from the British in 1966. During her time as the Prime Minister's wife, Plaskett was known for advocating relations between America and Barbados.

== Personal life ==
Born to Reverend Dr. George M. Plaskett of Saint Croix, United States Virgin Islands (USVI; formerly, up until 1917, the Danish West Indies), and Carrie Davenport of Montclair, New Jersey, Plaskett grew up in a religious household. The Plaskett family belonged to the Church of the Epiphany in Orange, New Jersey, where her father George Plaskett was the rector for 40 years. The Plaskett's were a middle-class family that were deeply involved with the community. Alongside being a scholar, Plaskett was also a member of her local YWCA in Orange, New Jersey.

After graduating from Orange High School in 1934, Plaskett went to Oberlin College to pursue her bachelor's degree and upon graduation went abroad to study in Paris and Denmark. While abroad, she met Errol Walton Barrow, who was studying at King's College in London. The two later married. Plaskett went on to have two children, Leslie Barrow and David Barrow.

After years of marriage, Errol Barrow died in 1987, leaving Carolyn a widow at the age of 70. She died in 2001 at the age of 84 in Barbados of a natural death.

== Education ==
At Oberlin College, she studied fine arts and was one of the few black students present at the college at the time. After completing her bachelor's degree at Oberlin College, Plaskett went abroad in 1937 for 18 months where she went onto graduate school and studied art at the New York School of Fine and Applied Art (now part of Parsons School of Design) in a dual location program in Denmark and Paris. She studied at the Maison de Molière and was a resident scholar at International People's College in Helsingor, Denmark.

== Legacy ==
As the First Lady of Barbados, Plaskett was a vital resource for the country. On September 10, 1968 she and the Prime Minister paid a visit to the White House under the Lyndon B. Johnson administration. Here a state dinner was held in efforts to build international relations and in congratulate Barbados on its independence from Britain.

Being the First Lady of Barbados, Plaskett believed in the efforts of humanitarianism among her busy schedule she was a member of the New Jersey Foundation of Colored Women's Clubs, Inc.
