= Khalil Wheeler-Weaver =

American serial killer (born 1996)

- Born: April 20, 1996 (age 30); Orange, New Jersey, U.S.
- Convictions: Murder (3 counts); Attempted murder Aggravated sexual assault (2 counts); Aggravated arson Kidnapping; Desecrating human remains (3 counts)
- Penalty: 160 years imprisonment

Details
- Victims: 3–4
- Span of crimes: August – November 2016
- Country: United States
- State: New Jersey
- Imprisoned at: New Jersey State Prison

Khalil Wheeler-Weaver (born April 20, 1996) is an American serial killer and arsonist. Using the social networking site Tagged, Wheeler-Weaver lured women and girls to secluded locations in Orange, New Jersey, and subsequently strangled them to death throughout late 2016.

The Essex County prosecutor's office credited friends of one of the victims with using social media to help police find Wheeler-Weaver. They gained access to her social media accounts, set up a fake account, lured Wheeler-Weaver to a meeting, and notified the police.

After a jury found him guilty in 2019, he was convicted of three counts of murder and desecration of human remains, attempted murder, two counts of aggravated sexual assault, aggravated arson and kidnapping, and was sentenced to 160 years in prison, with parole eligible after 140 years.

In March 2022, Wheeler-Weaver was charged with the October 2016 murder of 15-year-old Mawa Doumbia. Her remains were found in a house in Orange, New Jersey on May 9, 2019. Doumbia's remains were unidentified for more than two years. Wheeler-Weaver maintained his innocence, claiming he was framed.

== Early life ==
Wheeler-Weaver was born on April 20, 1996, and grew up in the "well-to-do" neighborhood of Seven Oaks in Orange, New Jersey. He comes from a family of law enforcement officials employed in the region: his stepfather is a detective in the neighboring town of East Orange and his uncle is retired from the Newark Police Department.

As a member of the class of 2014 at Orange High School, he had few friends, did not participate in extracurricular activities, and did not date.

A high school classmate described Wheeler-Weaver's style as nerdy, and thought that his tucked-in shirts, khaki pants, and plain white shoes were evidence that he came from a "good home, a good family." At the time of his crimes, Wheeler-Weaver worked as a security guard with Sterling Securities and, according to the search history on his phone, had hopes of becoming a police officer.

== Victims ==
- Robin Daphne Michele West (19): strangled, set on fire
- Sarah Butler (20): strangled
- Joanne Browne (33): asphyxiated
- Mawa Doumbia (15): strangled, alleged

Tiffany Taylor, who woke up in the middle of an attack, was Wheeler-Weaver's sole surviving victim. The two met at a motel in Elizabeth, New Jersey, then left in Wheeler-Weaver's car. Wheeler-Weaver then handcuffed Taylor, covered her mouth with duct tape, raped her, and nearly strangled her to death. After repeatedly losing consciousness, Taylor convinced Wheeler-Weaver to take her back to the motel, where she had left her cellphone, then locked him out of the room while she called 911. However, the police did not believe her story. Instead, they accused her of being a prostitute, threatened to arrest her, and refused to remove the handcuffs still dangling from her wrist.

== Crimes ==
Wheeler-Weaver used a variety of usernames–including LilYachtRock, and pimpkillerghost–on the social networking site Tagged in order to arrange dates with victims. He specifically targeted sex workers and offered money in exchange for sex in his online conversations with victims. A member of the prosecution in his 2019 trial argued that he chose to target these women because, "[Wheeler-Weaver] made a wager that no one would miss them."

Little physical evidence ties Wheeler-Weaver to the murders he committed, as he wore gloves and condoms during encounters with victims. A small amount of his DNA was found beneath the fingernails of one victim. His phone's geolocation data, though, tracked his movements during and after the murders, both to the places where he arranged to meet victims and the locations where their bodies were later discovered. He also used his phone to search the phrase, "homemade poison to kill humans."

== See also ==
- List of serial killers in the United States
