= Wayne Dickens =

American football player and coach

Biographical details
- Born: Orange, New Jersey

Playing career
- 1970–1971: Rutgers

Coaching career (HC unless noted)
- 1992–1993: Washington (GA)
- 1994: San Diego State (LB/ST)
- 1995–2001: San Diego State (WR)
- 2002: Hamilton Tiger-Cats (WR/ST)
- 2008: Kentucky State (WR)
- 2009–2012: Kentucky State
- 2013–2015: TCNJ
- 2020–2021: Simon Fraser (ST/DL/RC)
- 2022: Simon Fraser (OC)

Head coaching record
- Overall: 28–42

Wayne Dickens is an American former football player and coach. He served as the head football coach at Kentucky State University from 2009 to 2012 and The College of New Jersey (TCNJ) from 2013 to 2015, compiling a career college football coaching record of 28–42.

Raised in Orange, New Jersey, Dickens played as a center / linebacker at Orange High School.

== Head coaching record ==
Year	Team	Overall	Conference	Standing	Bowl/playoffs
Kentucky State Thorobreds (Southern Intercollegiate Athletic Conference) (2009–2012)
2009	Kentucky State	6–5	4–5	6th	
2010	Kentucky State	3–8	2–7	T–8th	
2011	Kentucky State	6–4	3–4	4th (West)	
2012	Kentucky State	2–8	0–7	5th (West)	
Kentucky State:		17–25	9–23		
TCNJ Lions (New Jersey Athletic Conference) (2013–2016)
2013	TCNJ	5–5	4–3	4th	
2014	TCNJ	2–8	1–6	T–7th	
2015	TCNJ	4–5	4–4	6th	
TCNJ:		11–18	3–3		
Total:		28–42			
