= Nicole Pride =

American academic administrator

12th President of West Virginia State University
- In office 2020 – July 2021
- Preceded by: R. Charles Byers (interim)
- Succeeded by: Ericke S. Cage

Personal details
- Children: 2
- Education: North Carolina State University; Seton Hall University; North Carolina A&T State University

Nicole M. Pride is an American academic administrator who was the twelfth president of the West Virginia State University from 2020 to 2021. She was previously the vice provost for academic strategy and operations at North Carolina A&T State University.

== Life ==
Pride is from Orange, New Jersey. She earned B.A. in business management and a B.A. economics from the North Carolina State University in 1987. She is a member of Alpha Kappa Alpha. Pride received a M.A. in corporate and public communication from Seton Hall University in 1998. Her thesis was titled, Why Black Males Have Emerged as One of the Most Troubled Groups of American Society: Their Academic Challenge, Poverty, and Social and Economic Isolation. Michael S. McGraw was her academic advisor.

For almost ten years, Pride worked at IBM as a marketing program manager in the corporate learning division and as a manager of corporate community relations and public affairs. She was the vice president for development and communications of the Child Care Services Association in Chapel Hill, North Carolina. Pride joined North Carolina A&T State University in 2010 where she held a variety of roles including liaison and senior advisor to the chancellor, chief of staff, and chief communications officer. She became its vice provost for academic strategy and operations in 2018. Pride completed a Ph.D. in leadership studies from North Carolina A&T State University. Her dissertation was titled, The Perceptions of University Leaders on Trustees Practice of Policy Governance: A Focus on Historically Black Colleges and Universities (HBCUs). In 2020, she became the twelfth president of the West Virginia State University. Succeeding interim president R. Charles Byers, she is the first female to serve in the role. She resigned in July 2021 and was succeeded on an interim basis by vice president Ericke S. Cage.

Pride has two sons.

== See also ==
- List of presidents of West Virginia State University
