= Pete D'Alonzo =

American football player (1929–2001)

No. 16, 39
- Position: Fullback

Personal information
- Born: May 26, 1929; Orange, New Jersey, U.S.
- Died: December 27, 2001 (aged 72); Morristown, New Jersey, U.S.
- Listed height: 5 ft 10 in (1.78 m)
- Listed weight: 210 lb (95 kg)

Career information
- High school: Orange
- College: Villanova (1947–1950)
- NFL draft: 1951: 4th round, 44th overall pick

Career history
- Detroit Lions (1951–1952)

Awards and highlights
- NFL champion (1952)

Career NFL statistics
- Rushing yards: 18
- Rushing average: 2.6
- Receptions: 2
- Receiving yards: 4
- Stats at Pro Football Reference

Peter Joseph D'Alonzo (May 26, 1929 – December 27, 2001) was an American professional football fullback who played two seasons with the Detroit Lions of the National Football League (NFL). He was selected by the Lions in the fourth round of the 1951 NFL draft after playing college football at Villanova University.

== Early life and college ==
Peter Joseph D'Alonzo was born on May 26, 1929, in Orange, New Jersey. He attended Orange High School in Orange.

D'Alonzo was a member of the Villanova Wildcats of Villanova University from 1947 to 1950 and a three-year letterman from 1948 to 1950. His 322 all-purpose yards against Duquesne in 1950 was a school record until being broken by Brian Westbrook in 1998.

== Professional career ==
D'Alonzo was selected by the Detroit Lions in the fourth round, with the 44th overall pick, of the 1951 NFL draft. He played in all 12 games, starting one, for the Lions during the 1951 season, rushing two times for 11 yards while also recovering one fumble. On December 28, 1952, the Lions beat the Cleveland Browns in the 1952 NFL Championship Game by a score of 17–7. However, D'Alonzo did not play in the game. He became a free agent after the season and re-signed with the Lions on May 15, 1952. D'Alonzo appeared in four games in 1952, recording five carries for seven yards and two receptions for four yards, before being waived on October 23, 1952.

== Personal life ==
D'Alonzo served in the United States Army. He died on December 27, 2001, in Morristown, New Jersey.
