= Howard Bison football =

American college football program

2026 Howard Bison football team
- First season: 1893; 133 years ago
- Head coach: Ted White; 1st season, 4–5 (.444)
- Location: Washington, D.C.
- Stadium: William H. Greene Stadium (capacity: 10,000)
- NCAA division: Division I FCS
- Conference: MEAC
- Colors: Navy blue and white
- All-time record: 534–517–40 (.508)
- Bowl record: 1–3 (.250)

Black college national championships
- 1920, 1923, 1925, 1926, 1993, 1996

Conference championships
- CIAA: 1912, 1914 MEAC: 1993, 2022, 2023
- Rivalries: Hampton (rivalry); Morehouse; Morgan State (rivalry)
- Marching band: "Showtime"
- Website: www.hubison.com/football

The Howard Bison football team represents Howard University in college football at the NCAA Division I Football Championship Subdivision (FCS) level as a member of the Mid-Eastern Athletic Conference (MEAC).

== History ==
First FBS Victory

On September 2, 2017, Howard football reached a milestone by defeating their first FBS opponent in program history. The Bison defeated the UNLV Rebels 43–40 in Sam Boyd Stadium. As of September 2017, Howard's victory against UNLV is the biggest point-spread upset in college football history, with UNLV being a 45.5 point favorite.

=== Classifications ===
- 1937–1972: NCAA College Division
- 1973–1977: NCAA Division II
- 1978–present: NCAA Division I–AA/FCS

=== Conference memberships ===
- 1893–1911: Independent
- 1912–1970: Central Intercollegiate Athletic Association
- 1971–present: Mid-Eastern Athletic Conference

== Championships ==
=== National championships ===
Year	Coach	Record	Championship
1920	Edward Morrison	7–0	Black College National champions
1923	Louis L. Watson	7–0–1	Black College National champions
1925	Louis L. Watson	6–0–1	Black College National Champions
1926	Louis L. Watson	7–0	Black College National Champions
1993	Steve Wilson	11–1	Black College National Champions
1996	Steve Wilson	10–2	Black College National Champions
Total national championships			6

=== Conference championships ===
Year	Coach	Conference	Conference record
1912	Ernest Marshall	Central Intercollegiate Athletics Association	2–0
1914	Ernest Marshall	Central Intercollegiate Athletics Association	1–0
1993	Steve Wilson	Mid-Eastern Athletic Conference	6–0
2022	Larry Scott	Mid-Eastern Athletic Conference	4–1
2023	Larry Scott	Mid-Eastern Athletic Conference	4–1
Total conference championships			5

See Note A

== Bowl games ==
The Bison have appeared in four bowl games, with a current record of 1–3.

Season	Bowl	Location	Opponent	Result
1933	Orange Blossom Classic	Jacksonville, FL	Florida A&M	L 6–9
1974	Orange Blossom Classic	Miami, FL	Florida A&M	L 13–17
1996	Heritage Bowl	Atlanta, GA	Southern	W 27–24
2023	Celebration Bowl	Atlanta, GA	Florida A&M	L 26–30

== Division I-AA/FCS playoffs results ==
The Bison have appeared in the I-AA/FCS playoffs one time with an overall record of 0–1.

Season	Bowl	Opponent	Result
1993	First Round	Marshall	L 14–28

== College Football Hall of Fame members ==
- Willie Jeffries
- Doug Porter

== Alumni in the NFL ==
Over 20 Howard alumni have played in the NFL, including:

- Ron Bartell
- Antoine Bethea
- Marques Douglas
- Omar Evans
- Derrick Faison
- Rupert Grant
- Gary Harrell
- John Javis
- Billy Jenkins
- Jimmie Johnson
- Troy Kyles
- Greg Pope
- Herman Redden
- Robert Sowell
- Leonard Stephens
- Elijah Thurmon
- Brandon Torrey
- Sean Vanhorse
- Jay Walker
- Tim Watson
- David Westbrook
- Jose White
- Tracy White
- Gary Willingham
- Marques Ogden
- Chris Rogers
- Steve Wilson
- Howie Williams

== Rivals ==
Howard's top rival is Hampton University. The two schools call their intense rivalry Battle of "The Real HU".

Howard also has a strong rivalry with Morgan State University in the Howard–Morgan State football rivalry.

Another of Howard's historic rivals is Morehouse College, more popularly known as the Howard/"Spel-House" rivalry due to Morehouse's close association with the all-women's HBCU Spelman College. This rivalry is not often played because Morehouse is a Division II athletic program, while Howard is Division I.

== See also ==
- List of black college football classics

== Notes ==
A. Howard went 9–1 and won the MEAC championship in 1987, however a later investigation by Howard University and MEAC found that coach Willie Jeffries used ineligible players. All wins from the 1987 season were vacated and the MEAC Championship was transferred to Delaware State, who had been the runner-up.
B. Rayford Petty was an assistant coach under Gary Harrell in 2011 and 2012. Gary Harrell stepped away from coaching Howard for the 2013 season for personal reasons, but remained under contract as the head coach to return in 2014. Rayford Petty was promoted to head coach for the 2013 season only, in a temporary role.

== Future non-conference opponents ==
Announced schedules as of March 5, 2026

2026	2027	2028	2029	2032
vs Alabama A&M (Atlanta, GA)		Princeton	at Princeton	at San Jose State
Richmond				
at Indiana				
at Rutgers				
vs Hampton (Washington, DC)				
at Penn				
Morehouse				
