= Byrd D. Crudup =

American sports coach, athletics administrator (1897–1960)

Biographical details
- Born: September 15, 1897; Edenton, North Carolina, U.S.
- Died: March 12, 1960 (aged 62); Charlotte, North Carolina, U.S.

Playing career

Football
- 1922–1924: Lincoln (PA)
- Position: End

Coaching career (HC unless noted)

Football
- 1928–1931: Bartlett HS (MO)
- 1928–1931: North Carolina College
- 1935–1940: Dillard
- 1946–1948: Johnson C. Smith

Basketball
- 1927–1928: North Carolina College

Administrative career (AD unless noted)
- 1935–?: Dillard
- 1946–1960: Johnson C. Smith

Head coaching record
- Overall: 20–66–9 (college football); 0–6 (college basketball)
- Bowls: 0–1

Byrd Dewey Crudup (September 15, 1897 – March 12, 1960) was an American football and basketball coach and college athletics administrator. He served as the head football coach at the North Carolina College for Negroes—now known as North Carolina Central University in Durham, North Carolina—from 1928 to 1931, Dillard University in New Orleans, Louisiana from 1935 to 1940, and at Johnson C. Smith University in Charlotte, North Carolina from 1946 to 1948. Crudup was also head basketball coach at North Carolina Central for one season, in 1927–28.

== Early life, playing career, and education ==
Crudup was born on September 15, 1897, in Edenton, North Carolina, to Byrd Crudup and Delia Stark Crudup. He graduated from Rindge Manual Training School in Cambridge, Massachusetts. Crudup played college football at Lincoln University in Oxford, Pennsylvania. He was named to the All-Colored Intercollegiate Athletic Association (CIAA) team in 1923 and 1924 and was captain of the 1924 Lincoln Lions football team, which won the CIAA title and a black college football national championship.

Crudup graduated from Lincoln with an A.B. degree in 1925 and earned Master of Education degree from Boston University in 1939. He also did additional studies at Boston University and Harvard University.

== Coaching career ==
In 1927, Byrd coached football at Bartlett High School in St. Joseph, Missouri. The following year, he was hired as the head football coach at North Carolina College for Negroes—now known as North Carolina Central University in Durham, North Carolina.

== Head coaching record ==
=== College football ===
Year	Team	Overall	Conference	Standing	Bowl/playoffs
North Carolina College Eagles (Colored Intercollegiate Athletic Association) (1928–1931)
1928	North Carolina College	2–6–1	0–6–1	9th	
1929	North Carolina College	0–7	0–6	9th	
1930	North Carolina College	3–6–1	2–5–1	T–8th	
1931	North Carolina College	5–3–1	5–3	5th	
North Carolina College:		10–22–3	7–20–2		
Dillard Bleu Devils (Independent) (1935–1940)
1935	Dillard	1–3–1			
1936	Dillard	1–4			
1937	Dillard	2–3–1			
1938	Dillard	4–2			
1939	Dillard	1–5			
1940	Dillard	0–5–1			
Dillard:		9–22–3			
Johnson C. Smith Golden Bulls (Colored Intercollegiate Athletic Association) (1946–1949)
1946	Johnson C. Smith	0–7–2	0–6–2	14th	L Pecan Bowl
1947	Johnson C. Smith	1–8	1–7	14th	
1948	Johnson C. Smith	0–7–1	0–7–1	14th	
Johnson C. Smith:		1–22–3	1–20–3		
Total:		20–66–9			
