= 1904 Lincoln Tigers football team =

American college football season

1904 Lincoln Tigers football
- Conference: Missouri region/conference
- Record: 2–1 (2–1 or 1–1 Missouri region/conference)

1904 Missouri Valley Conference for Black Schools / Missouri region black football standings
	Conf.					Overall
Team	W		L		T	W		L		T
Sumner $	1	–	0	–	0	1	–	0	–	0
Columbia	1	–	0	–	0	1	–	0	–	0
Lincoln (MO)	2	–	1	–	0	2	–	1	–	0
Lincoln (KC)	0	–	1	–	0	0	–	1	–	0
Western University	0	–	1	–	0	0	–	1	–	0
St. Joseph Colored	0	–	1	–	0	0	–	1	–	0
George R. Smith	0	–	0	–	0	0	–	0	–	0
$ – Conference champion

The 1904 Lincoln Tigers football team represented Lincoln Institute—now known as Lincoln University—in Jefferson City, Missouri as Missouri Valley Conference for Black Schools during the 1904 college football season. The Tigers played in the Missouri region or conference this season. Lincoln compiled a winning record of 2–1, shutting out two of their opponents.

== Schedule ==
Date	Opponent	Site	Result	Source
November 10	at Western University (KS)	Kansas City, MO	W 11–0	
November 11	at St. Joseph Colored High School	League Park; St. Joseph, MO	W 23–0	
November 22	at Columbia High School	Columbia, MO	L	
