= 1910 Lincoln Tigers football team =

American college football season

1910 Lincoln Tigers football

Missouri Valley Conference for Black Schools champion
- Conference: Missouri Valley Conference for Black Schools
- Record: 2–0 (5 played) (1–0 or 2–0 Missouri Valley Conference for Black Schools)
- Head coach: Romeo West

1910 Missouri Valley Conference for Black Schools football standings
	Conf.					Overall
Team	W		L		T	W		L		T
Lincoln (MO) $	1	–	0	–	0	2	–	0	–	0
Western University	1	–	2	–	0	2	–	2	–	0
Lawrence Athletics	1	–	1	–	0	1	–	1	–	0
George R. Smith			–			0	–	0	–	0
Topeka Industrial Institute			–			0	–	0	–	0
$ – Conference champion

The 1910 Lincoln Tigers football team represented Lincoln Institute—now known as Lincoln University—in Jefferson City, Missouri as a member of the Missouri Valley Conference for Black Schools during the 1910 college football season. The Tigers played three games this season, winning two, with the third score unknown. The Tigers' game versus Western University (Kansas) was for the conference championship, as well as the Missouri-Kansas title game. The Lincoln Tigers won the game 8–6 and were named conference champions, as well as champions of Missouri and Kansas.

== Schedule ==
Date	Time	Opponent	Site	Result	Source
October 22		Columbia football team*	Jefferson City, MO	W 15–0	
November		at Kansas City team	Kansas City, MO		
November		at St. Joseph team	St. Joseph, MO		
November 12		George R. Smith	Lincoln Institute gridiron; Jefferson City, MO		
November 24	2:30 p.m.	at Western University (KS)	Shelley Park; Kansas City, MO	W 8–6	
*Non-conference game
