= 1916 Lincoln Tigers football team =

American college football season

1916 Lincoln Tigers football
- Conference: Missouri Valley Conference for Black Schools
- Record: 2–1 (4 played) (2–1 Missouri Valley Conference for Black Schools)
- Head coach: Romeo West (8th season)

1916 Missouri Valley Conference for Black Schools football standings
	Conf.					Overall
Team	W		L		T	W		L		T
Western University $	1	–	0	–	0	1	–	0	–	0
Columbia Athletics $	3	–	0	–	0	4	–	0	–	0
Lincoln (MO)	2	–	1	–	0	2	–	1	–	0
Western College	3	–	2	–	1	3	–	3	–	1
Sumner	1	–	1	–	0	1	–	1	–	0
Columbia	0	–	1	–	1	0	–	1	–	1
George R. Smith	0	–	1	–	0	0	–	1	–	0
Lawrence Athletics	0	–	1	–	0	0	–	1	–	0
East St. Louis	0	–	1	–	0	0	–	1	–	0
Lincoln (KC)	0	–	1	–	0	0	–	1	–	0
Booneville	0	–	1	–	0	0	–	1	–	0
$ – Conference champion

The 1916 Lincoln Blue Tigers football team represented Lincoln Institute—now known as Lincoln University—in Jefferson City, Missouri as a member of the Missouri Valley Conference for Black Schools during the 1916 college football season. Led by head coach Romeo West, the team compiled a known record of 1–1 in conference play, but played three games total. The Tigers contended for the Missouri Valley title this season, losing in the championship game to Western University (Kansas).

== Schedule ==
Date	Opponent	Site	Result	Source
October 21	East St. Louis High School	Lincoln Institute Ground; Jefferson City, MO	W 46–6	
October 28	George R. Smith	Ruwart's Park; Jefferson City, MO		
November	Western College (MO)	Jefferson City, MO	W 19–0	
November 30	at Western University (KS)	Association Park; Kansas City, MO	L 10–28	
