= Corrvine Patterson =

American politician

Street Commissioner

City Marshal

Deputy Sheriff

Personal details
- Born: 1848 Howard County, Missouri
- Died: 1913 (aged 64–65)
- Education: Self-educated
- Occupation: Business owner and politician
- Known for: African-American community activism

Corrvine Patterson (1848 – 1913) was a businessman and politician. He was an influential figure in the early history of the African American community in Wyandotte County.

== Early life ==
Patterson was born a slave in Howard County, Missouri. His mother was Lettie Patterson. He was self-educated.

== Career ==
Patterson served the Union Army in the Civil War. Around 1868, he left service and moved to the town of Wyandotte, Kansas. He labored for the railroad, opened a grocery store in the 1870s, owned several tracts of land in what is now downtown Kansas City, Kansas, and opened a cesspool and vault cleaning service. He quit his grocery store in favor of a full-time political career spanning many offices. In 1889, he was appointed street commissioner. He became city marshal and deputy sheriff. By 1900, he was the elder statesman in the African American community of Wyandotte County.

== Community Involvement ==
Patterson was a member of the First Baptist Church, and later a founding member of the Metropolitan Baptist Church.

Patterson was a civil rights activist. He was one of the main organizers helping Exodusters—destitute refugees of the Kansas Fever Exodus, in which tens of thousands of freed slaves fled the South in favor of eastern Kansas. He led efforts to save Freedman's University (later renamed Western University) in the neighboring town of Quindaro.
