= Nora Holt =

American critic, composer and singer (1883/4/5–1974)

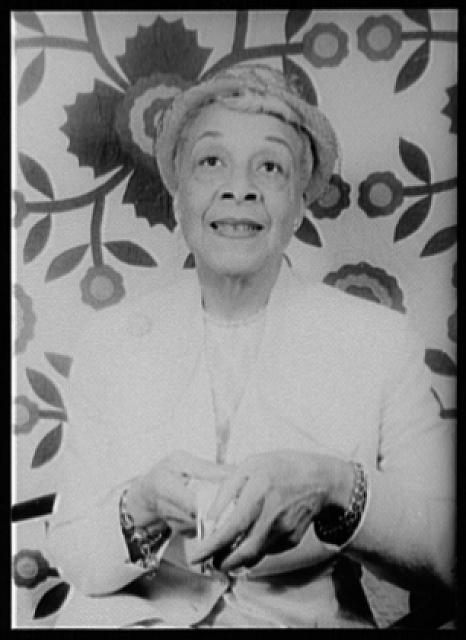
- Portrait by Carl Van Vechten, 1955
- Born: Lena or Lora Douglas; November 8, 1883/4/5; Kansas City, Kansas, U.S.
- Died: January 25, 1974 (aged 89); Los Angeles, California, U.S.
- Other name: Nora Douglas Holt
- Education: Western University; Chicago Musical College; The American Conservatory in Fontainebleau
- Occupations: Critic, composer, singer and pianist
- Spouses: Sky James; Philip Scroggins; Bruce Jones; George Holt (m. 1916, died); Joseph L. Ray (m. 1923)

Nora Douglas Holt (November 8, 1883/4/5 – January 25, 1974) was an American critic, composer, singer and pianist who was the first African American to receive a master's degree in music in the United States. She composed more than 200 works of music and was associated with the leading figures of the Harlem Renaissance and the co-founder of the National Association of Negro Musicians. She died in 1974 in Los Angeles, California.

== Early life ==
She was born Lena or Lora Douglas in Kansas City, Kansas, between 1883 and 1885 (the exact year of her birth is contested) to Calvin Douglas, an African Methodist Episcopal Church minister, and Gracie Brown Douglas. Her mother encouraged her to start piano lessons at the age of four, giving her an early affinity for music and leading to her playing organ for several years in St. Augustine's Episcopal Church in Kansas City. Her father Calvin was a presiding elder with the AME Church and was on the board of trustees for Western University. He wrote the words for the school song, "O Western U." for the dedication of Grant Hall in 1907. Nora Holt wrote the music for this song but destroyed the score in a dispute for authorship between her and her music professor who only helped with some of the harmonies.

Holt graduated valedictorian from Western University at Quindaro, Kansas, in 1917 with a bachelor's degree in music. In 1918, she earned her master's degree in music at Chicago Musical College, the first African American to earn a master's degree in music composition in the United States. Her thesis composition was an orchestral work called Rhapsody on Negro Themes. In 1931, she studied with Nadia Boulanger at The American Conservatory in Fontainebleau, France. In the late 1930s, Holt also studied music education at the University of Southern California.

== Career ==
From 1917 to 1923, Holt contributed music criticism to the Chicago Defender, one of the most famous and influential Black newspapers in America. In 1919, Holt led a mobilization of composers and musicians to establish the National Association of Negro Musicians (NANM), of which she was a founding member. Among her colleagues in this movement were composers and artists such as Florence Price, Robert Nathaniel Dett, and Clarence Cameron White. From 1921 to 1922, Holt published and edited a monthly magazine for Black musicians entitled Music and Poetry. It was in this magazine where Holt published two of her own compositions, Negro Dance, for piano and an art song titled The Sand-Man. Regarding the latter, although Paul Laurence Dunbar wrote a poem of the same title, there is almost no overlap between the text of Dunbar's poem and that of Holt's piece; the text may be Holt's original work, and its source is currently unknown. Holt's journal also contained contributions from artists and writers such as Clarence Cameron White, Kemper Harreld, Helen Hagan, and Maud Cuney Hare, among many others.

Between 1923 and 1943, Holt withdrew from music criticism and spent many of these years traveling in Europe and Asia. By 1926, she had composed more than 200 works for orchestral music and chamber songs. Sadly, all of her compositions were stolen during her time abroad and only her two previously published works survived. In 1943, she took a position as an editor and music critic with a Black-oriented publication Amsterdam News.

In 1945, she began the annual American Negro Artists show on radio station WNYC, and from 1953 through 1964 she was the producer and musical director of a weekly program, Nora Holt's Concert Showcase, on Harlem's WLIB radio station. In 1966, she participated in the First World Festival of Negro Arts in Dakar, Senegal. Among many of the honors she received during her lifetime, one of the most prestigious was her election to the Music Critics Circle of New York.

== Personal life ==
Douglas married five times. At the age of 15, she married a musician called Sky James, then two years later married politician Philip Scroggins, followed not long afterwards by a marriage to a barber named Bruce Jones. In 1916, she married her fourth husband, hotel owner George Holt, taking his name and changing her first name to "Nora".

During the 1920s, Holt was known as a wild socialite. She was wealthy due to her inheritance from her late husband George Holt, who died two years after their marriage. In 1923, she married Joseph L. Ray, assistant to tycoon Charles Schwab, in her fifth marriage. They moved to Pennsylvania.

After the break-up of this marriage 19 months later, she took the name of her former husband, changing it from Ray to Holt. In the early 1920s, she moved to Harlem, where she became an important part of the Harlem Renaissance. She became good friends many visionaries, activists, and novelists of the time, including Langston Hughes and Carl Van Vechten.

== Notable works ==
Most of Holt's musical compositions have not been preserved.

- Negro Dance (Nora's Dance) Op. 25, No. 1 - Piano solo. Recording with video.
- Rhapsody on Negro Themes
- The Sand-Man - Duet for voice and piano originally published in 1921 in Music and Poetry.

== Death ==
Nora Holt died at the age of 89 on January 25, 1974, in a Los Angeles nursing home.
