= L. Viola Kinney =

American composer, pianist, and teacher (c. 1890–1945)

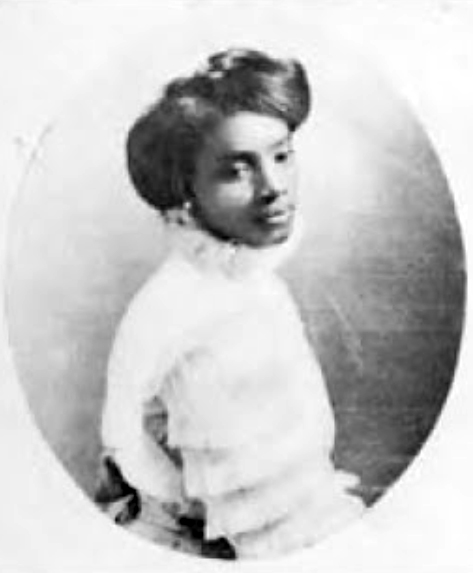
- Portrait on the cover of Mother's Sacrifice, 1909
- Born: Lady Viola Kinney; December 27, 1891; Sedalia, Missouri, U.S.
- Died: September 25, 1945 (aged 53); Sedalia, Missouri, U.S.
- Occupations: composer; educator; pianist

Lady Viola Kinney (December 27, 1891 – September 25, 1945) was an American composer, pianist and teacher who was active during the first half of the twentieth century. Her piano piece Mother's Sacrifice was published in 1909 and recorded by Albany Records in 2005.

== Life ==
Born Lady Viola Kinney in Sedalia, Missouri, she was one of the five children of Patrick and Lillian Kinney. Her father was a cook and her mother worked in the shops of the Missouri Pacific Railroad. Kinney studied music at Western University, a historically black college in Quindaro, Kansas, where she participated in the harmony class and the choral society under the tutorship of Robert G. Jackson, Director of the music department. After she completed her college education she moved back to Sedalia where in 1911 she began a 35-year career as a teacher of music and English at the segregated secondary school, Lincoln High School. She became head of the school's music department and also gave piano recitals in Sedalia and surrounding towns. She had married Frederick Ferguson, an undertaker in 1918, but the couple separated in 1925. After the separation Kinney lived in her widowed mother's house and later reverted to her maiden name.

Kinney died in 1945 and was initially buried in Crown Hill Cemetery in Sedalia.

Her composition for solo piano, Mother's Sacrifice, is the only score that has been found, although she registered the copyrights for at least two other compositions: Show Me, set to a text by Fredericka Douglass Perry (Note: Fredericka Douglass Perry (1872–1943) was the granddaughter of Frederick Douglass and a pioneer of child welfare work in Kansas City, Missouri.) (1941) and Time Out for Love (1943).

She also composed a musical comedy From Dixie to Harlem (c. 1936) which include the songs Dixie, Chillun, Chillun, The Ghost of Simon Legree, Troubled, Moon Dear, If You’re in Love, Honey Chile, Harlem Strut, Paper Boy, You Needn’t Call Me, Dixie, and the two songs Days and Eyes That Stole My Daddy Away (both 1936 or earlier) not from the musical.

== Mother's Sacrifice ==
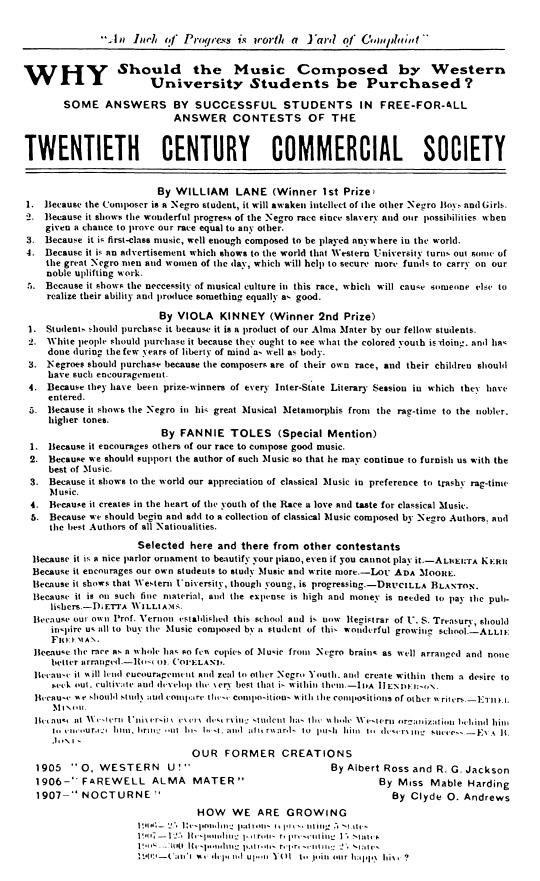
Inside back cover of the sheet music for Mother's Sacrifice, published in 1909

Kinney's Mother’s Sacrifice is a solo piano piece for which she won second prize in the Inter-State Literary Society Original Music Contest held at Omaha, Nebraska in 1908. (The first prize was won by Claude Minor of Lawrence, Kansas, also a student of the Western University harmony class.) One year later it was published by the Twentieth Century Commercial Society of Western University. The score was republished in Black women composers: a century of piano music (1893-1990) in 1992.

When asked why should the music composed by Western University students be purchased, Viola Kinney, then a student at the university wrote:

1.Students should purchase it because it is a product of our Alma Mater by our fellow students.

2.White people should purchase it because they ought to see what the colored youth is doing, and has done during the few years of liberty of mind as well as body.

3.Negroes should purchase because the composers are of their own race, and their children should have such encouragement.

4.Because they have been prize-winners of every Inter-state Literary Session in which they have entered.

5.Because it shows the Negro in his great Musical Metamorphis from the rag-time to the nobler, higher tones.

Mother's Sacrifice was recorded in 2005 and appears on the CD Soulscapes, an anthology of piano music by African-American women released on the Albany Records label. In 2009, the 100th anniversary of its publication, Mother's Sacrifice was performed in a concert at the University of West Georgia.

Sheet music for Mother's Sacrifice is available through multiple sources, including Sheet Music Plus (PDF) and Hildegard Publishing Company (book).
