= Romeo West =

American football player, coach (1881–1918)

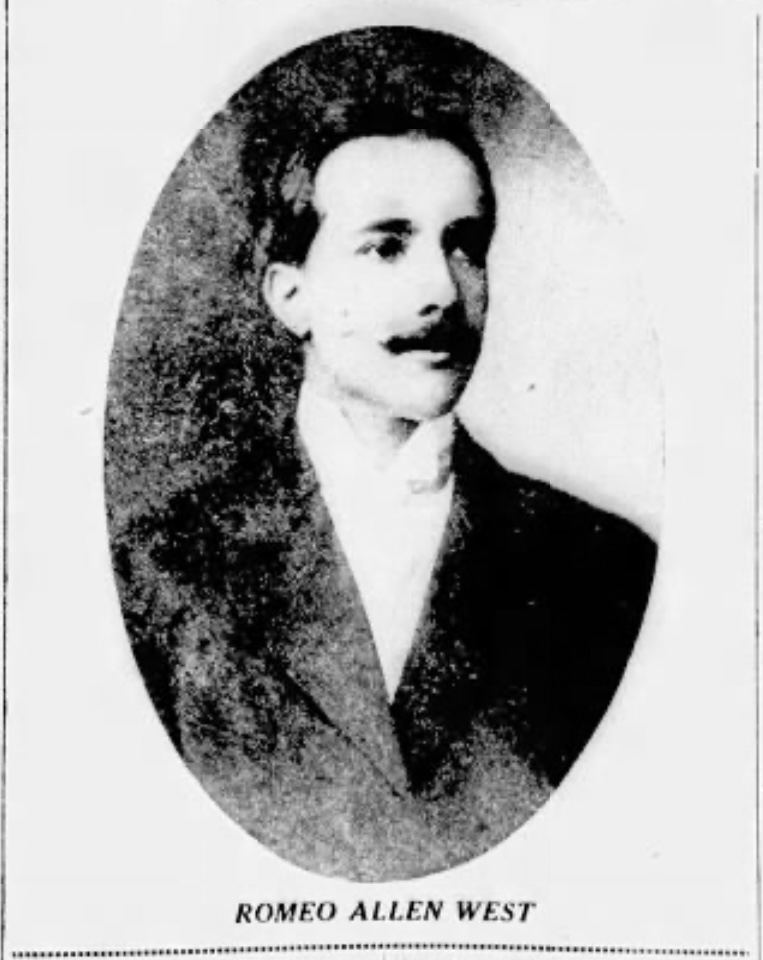

Biographical details
- Born: January 8, 1881; St. Louis, MO
- Died: March 29, 1918 (aged 37); Jefferson City, MO
- Education: Lincoln Institute (1901)

Playing career

Football
- 1900: Lincoln Institute
- Position: Halfback

Head coaching record
- Overall: 16–8 (football)
- Tournaments: 0–2 (black championships)

Accomplishments and honors

Championships
- 1 (Missouri black Schools region) (contested)

Records
- Most wins in a single Lincoln (MO) football season (6). 1906–1951

Romeo Allen West (January 8, 1881 – March 29, 1918) was an American college football player, coach of college football, college baseball, as well as other sports. He served as the head football coach at Lincoln Institute in Jefferson City, Missouri from 1905 to 1909, and again from 1913 to 1918, compiling a career college football coaching record of 16–8. He also served as the Lincoln Institute librarian and secretary to the institute's president. As a college football player, West was the captain and right halfback of the successful 1900 Lincoln Tigers football team that lost the national championship game.

Before the 1905 season, West was hired to coach the football team. He went a perfect 3–0 in his first season at the helm. One newspaper claims a title for West's Tigers in 1905, while another disputes it. In 1906 the football team won 6 games, a single-season record that stood for over 45 years until Dwight T. Reed broke the record in 1951. From 1905 to 1908, Romeo Wests Tigers lost only one game. Due to conflict, West left Lincoln in 1909, but returned in 1913. The win totals in his second stint would not match his first. However, West would still coach his team to two Missouri Valley (for Black Schools) championship games in 1914 and 1916. Unfortunately, West and Lincoln came up short both times.

On March 29, 1918, Romeo West got into a dispute with fellow Lincoln employee, Theodore Martin. The argument turned violent and a duel ensued. In the end, Romeo West lay dead on institute grounds. At just 37, his death was a tragic loss to both the community and his family. President Benjamin F. Allen of Lincoln was reportedly very upset, as Romeo had been like a son to him.

Romeo West left a legacy that would not be beaten for many years, and set a standard of stability during his time as Lincoln's football coach. He was both the winningest and longest tenured coach of the "Lincoln Institute" era, and set a multitude of records that would last decades.

== Head coaching record ==
=== Football ===
Year	Team	Overall	Conference	Standing	Bowl/playoffs
Lincoln Tigers (Missouri black schools region) (1896–c.1909)
1905	Lincoln	3–0	3–0	1st?	
1906	Lincoln	6–1	N/A		
1907	Lincoln	1–0	N/A		
1908	Lincoln	2–0	N/A		
Lincoln Tigers (Missouri Valley Conference for Black Schools) (c.1910–c.1925/35)
1913	Lincoln	1–1	N/A		
1914	Lincoln	1–3	1–3	3rd	
1915	Lincoln	0–2	N/A		
1916	Lincoln	2–1	2–1	3rd	
1917	Lincoln	N/A	N/A		
Lincoln:		18–6	3–4		
Total:		18–6			
National championship Conference title Conference division title or championship game berth
