= C.C. Hubbard High School =

- U.S. National Register of Historic Places
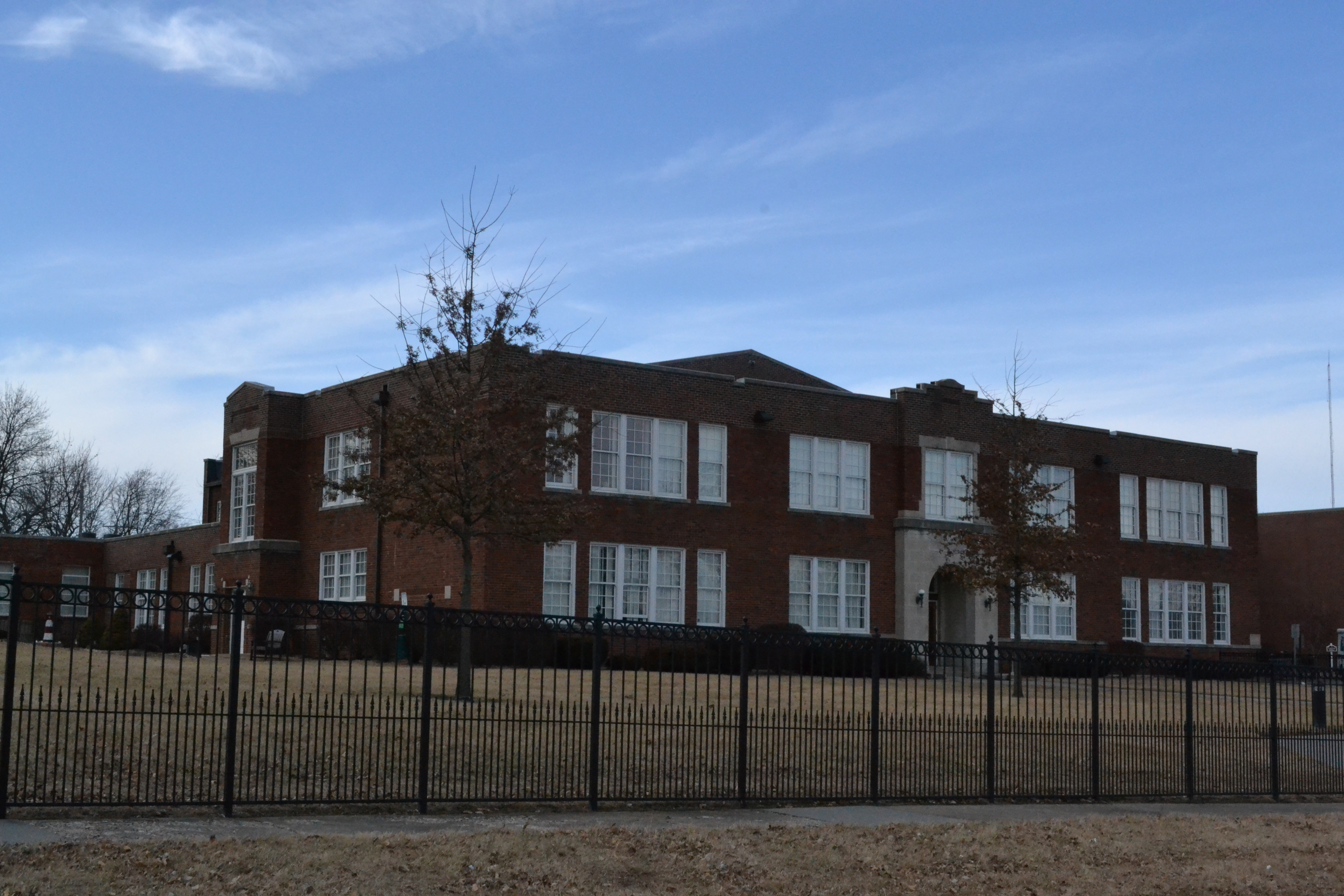

- Location within Missouri Location within the United States
- Location: 721 N. Osage Ave., Sedalia, Missouri
- Coordinates: 38°42′58″N 93°13′38″W
- Area: 2 acres (0.81 ha)
- Built: 1928
- Architect: Johnson, Clifford H.; Dean & Hancock
- NRHP reference No.: 97000628
- Added to NRHP: July 3, 1997

C.C. Hubbard High School, also known as Lincoln School and Lincoln-Hubbard School , was a high school for African American students in Sedalia, Pettis County, Missouri. It was built in 1928, and is a two-story, symmetrical brick building. Projecting wings were added in 1952 to house a cafeteria and an industrial arts classroom. It is the last remaining building in Sedalia, Missouri, to be built and used as a separate school for African-American students.

Composer and music educator L. Viola Kinney taught music and English at the school for 35 years. The school closed in 1962. The former school has been renovated as an apartment building.

It was listed on the National Register of Historic Places in 1997.
