= Fannie De Grasse Black =

American singer and pianist

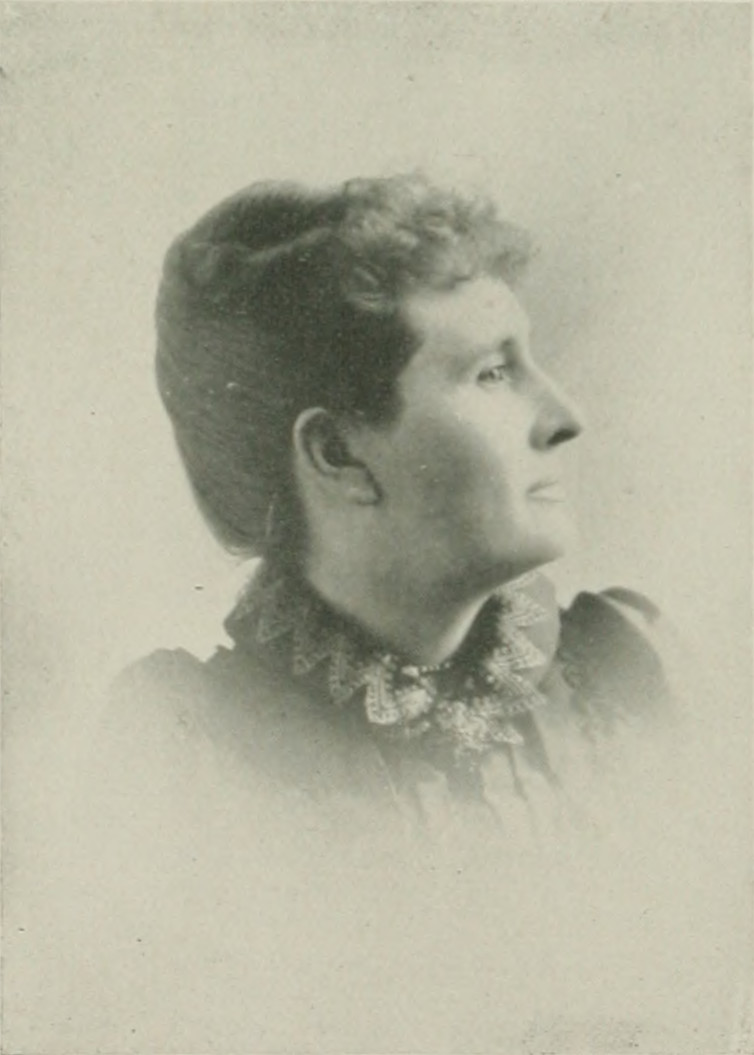
Fannie De Grasse Black

Frances De Grasse Black (November 21, 1856 - August 28, 1930) was a singer and pianist.

== Early life ==
Frances "Fannie" De Grasse was born in Canada, on November 21, 1856.

She moved with her parents to the United States and made her home in Milwaukee, Wisconsin, where she was educated in the high and normal schools, graduating in 1874. At ten years of age she began the study of piano and sight singing, continuing until her sixteenth year, when she became a pupil of Prof. William Mickler, formerly director in court to the Duke of Hesse, Germany, studying with him for four years.

== Career ==
Fannie De Grasse sang in public when she was only six years old, and made her debut in classic music at the age of eighteen, under the direction of Professor Mickler, in the concerts of the Milwaukee German Musical Society.

Later on De Grasse took up the study of the pipe organ and in 1892 became an organist of the Presbyterian church, El Dorado.

She became an instructor at the Western Conservatory of Music, of Kansas City and Chicago, in El Dorado.

She sang equally well in English, German and Italian.

== Personal life ==
Fannie De Grasse moved from Milwaukee to Winfield, Kansas, at the home of some relatives, for health reasons. In 1872 De Grasse went to El Dorado, Kansas, to conduct a "musical convention" and met Judge Samuel Edward Black.

In 1881 Fannie De Grasse married Samuel Edward Black (died September 27, 1916) and her El Dorado home was a center of music and refinement. They had one daughter, Grace Louise, who later married Burns Hegler, editor and manager of The Walnut Valley Times.

She died on August 28, 1930, in her old home in El Dorado, and is buried with her husband at Belle Vista Cemetery, El Dorado.
