= Dwight T. Reed =

American football player, coach (1915–2000)

Biographical details
- Born: March 13, 1915; St. Paul, Minnesota, U.S.
- Died: May 31, 2000 (aged 85); Jefferson City, Missouri, U.S.

Playing career

Football
- 1935–1937: Minnesota
- Position: End

Coaching career (HC unless noted)

Football
- 1946–1948: Louisville Municipal
- 1949–1972: Lincoln (MO)

Basketball
- 1955–1959: Lincoln (MO)

Track and field
- 1949–1993: Lincoln (MO) (men's)
- 1985–1993: Lincoln (MO) (women's)

Administrative career (AD unless noted)
- 1957–1980: Lincoln (MO)

Head coaching record
- Overall: 149–84–7 (football); 63–61 (basketball)

Accomplishments and honors

Championships
- Football; 4 MWAA/Midwest (1952–1953, 1958, 1962); 1 MIAA (1972)

Awards
- All-Big Ten (1935)

Dwight Thornton Reed (May 13, 1915 – May 31, 2000) was an American college football player, coach of college football, college basketball, and track, and athletics administrator. He served as the head football coach at Louisville Municipal College (a separate Negro College of University of Louisville) in Louisville, Kentucky and Lincoln University in Jefferson City, Missouri from 1949 to 1972, compiling a career college football coaching record of 149–84–7. As a college football player, Reed lettered three times at the University of Minnesota and competed on the Gopher's 1935 and 1936 national championship squads.

== Head coaching record ==
=== Football ===
Year	Team	Overall	Conference	Standing	Bowl/playoffs
Louisville Municipal Bantams (Independent) (1946)
1946	Louisville Municipal	5–2			
Louisville Municipal Bantams (Midwest Athletic Association) (1947–1948)
1947	Louisville Municipal	6–1–1	NA	NA	
1948	Louisville Municipal	3–5	0–3	5th	
Louisville Municipal:		14–8–1	0–3		
Lincoln Blue Tigers (Midwest Athletic Association / Midwest Conference / Midwestern Conference) (1949–1966)
1949	Lincoln	3–6	0–3	5th	
1950	Lincoln	1–7	0–3	4th	
1951	Lincoln	7–2	1–2	3rd	
1952	Lincoln	8–0–1	4–0–1	1st	
1953	Lincoln	8–0–1	4–0–1	1st	
1954	Lincoln	4–3–1	3–2	4th	
1955	Lincoln	5–3	3–1	T–2nd	
1956	Lincoln	5–4	1–2	5th	
1957	Lincoln	8–1	2–1	3rd	
1958	Lincoln	7–1	3–0	1st	
1959	Lincoln	7–2–1	0–2–1	4th	
1960	Lincoln	3–5	2–1	2nd	
1961	Lincoln	2–6	0–3	4th	
1962	Lincoln	5–3–1	2–0–1	1st	
1963	Lincoln	5–5	2–1	2nd	
1964	Lincoln	8–2	2–1	2nd	
1965	Lincoln	5–5	2–1	2nd	
1966	Lincoln	7–2	1–1	2nd	
Lincoln Blue Tigers (NCAA College Division independent) (1967–1969)
1967	Lincoln	3–5			
1968	Lincoln	8–2			
1969	Lincoln	5–3–1			
Lincoln Blue Tigers (Missouri Intercollegiate Athletic Association) (1970–1972)
1970	Lincoln	7–3	3–3	4th	
1971	Lincoln	5–5	3–3	3rd	
1972	Lincoln	9–1	5–1	T–1st	
Lincoln:		135–76–6	43–31–4		
Total:		149–84–7			
National championship Conference title Conference division title or championship game berth
