= Quindaro Townsite =

Historical site

Coordinates: 39°09′14″N 94°39′42″W

- U.S. National Register of Historic Places
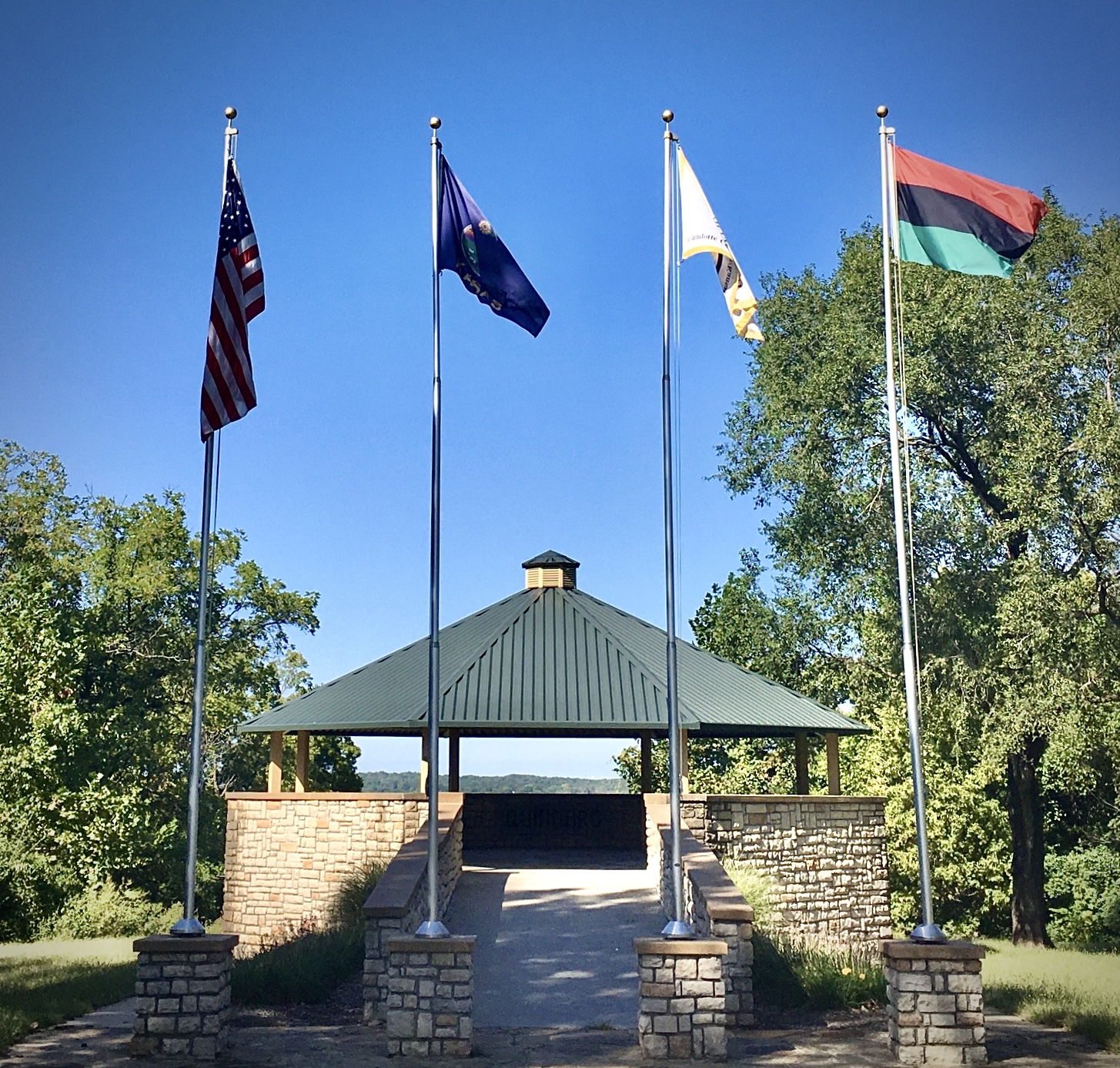
- Quindaro Townsite ruins in 2019

- Location within Kansas Location within the United States
- Location: Kansas City, KS
- Built: 1857; 169 years ago
- NRHP reference No.: 02000547
- Added to NRHP: May 22, 2002

Quindaro Townsite was once a settlement, then a ghost town, and later an archaeological site. It is around North 27th Street and the Missouri Pacific Railroad tracks in Kansas City, Kansas. It was placed on the National Register of Historic Places on May 22, 2002.

The townsite was purchased and organized in 1856 from and by Wyandots for development as a port-of-entry for Free Staters settling further within the Kansas Territory, with construction starting in 1857. The boomtown population peaked at 600, rapidly settled by migrants. They were supported by the New England Emigrant Aid Company, who were trying to help secure Kansas as a free territory. One of several villages hugging the narrow bank of the Missouri River under the bluffs, the town was established as part of the resistance to stop the westward spread of slavery. Quindaro's people also aided escaped slaves from Missouri as a "station" on the Underground Railroad.

After Kansas was established as a free state, there was less need for the port and growth slowed in the commercial district. At the same time the economy in Kansas suffered from speculation.

In 1862 classes were started for children of former slaves, and in 1865 a group of men chartered Quindaro Freedman's School (later Western University), the first black school west of the Mississippi River. Former slaves continued to gather in the residential community, which became mostly African American by the late 19th century. The area was incorporated into Kansas City in the early 20th century. Western University closed in 1943.

The town sharply declined during a nationwide economic depression and the American Civil War. The lower commercial townsite was abandoned and became overgrown. It was rediscovered during archaeological study in the late 1980s, which revealed many parts of the 1850s town. The only structure surviving from Western University and Quindaro is a full-size statue of abolitionist John Brown. In 1978 the John Brown Memorial Plaza was dedicated.

The John D. Dingell Jr. Conservation, Management, and Recreation Act designated it the Quindaro Townsite National Commemorative Site in 2019, allowing the National Park Service to provide technical and financial assistance for preservation and education.

== History ==
=== Foundation ===
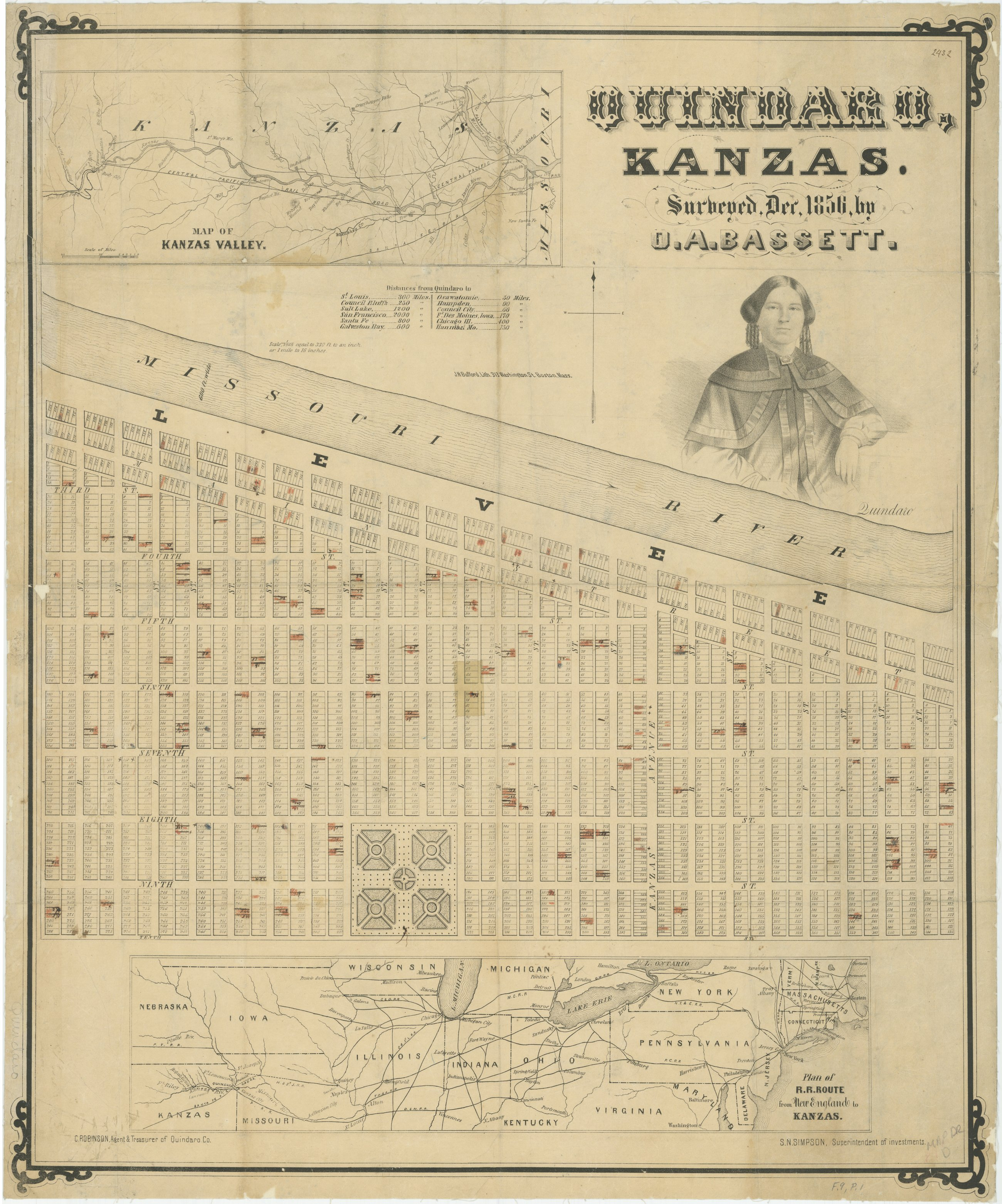
Quindaro Townsite, 1856

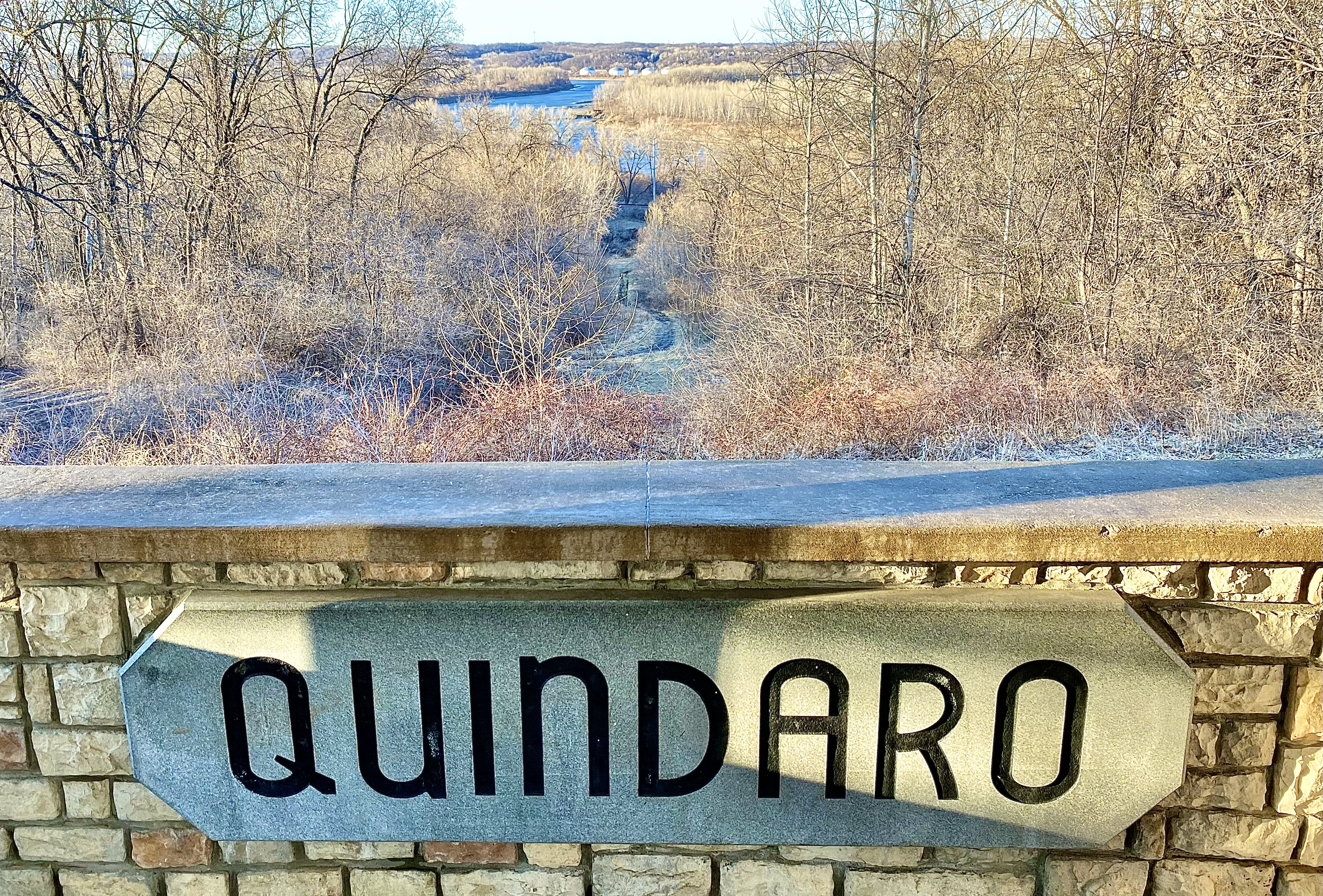
Overlook from the area of the upper townsite, down toward the archaeological ruins of the original lower townsite next to the Missouri River

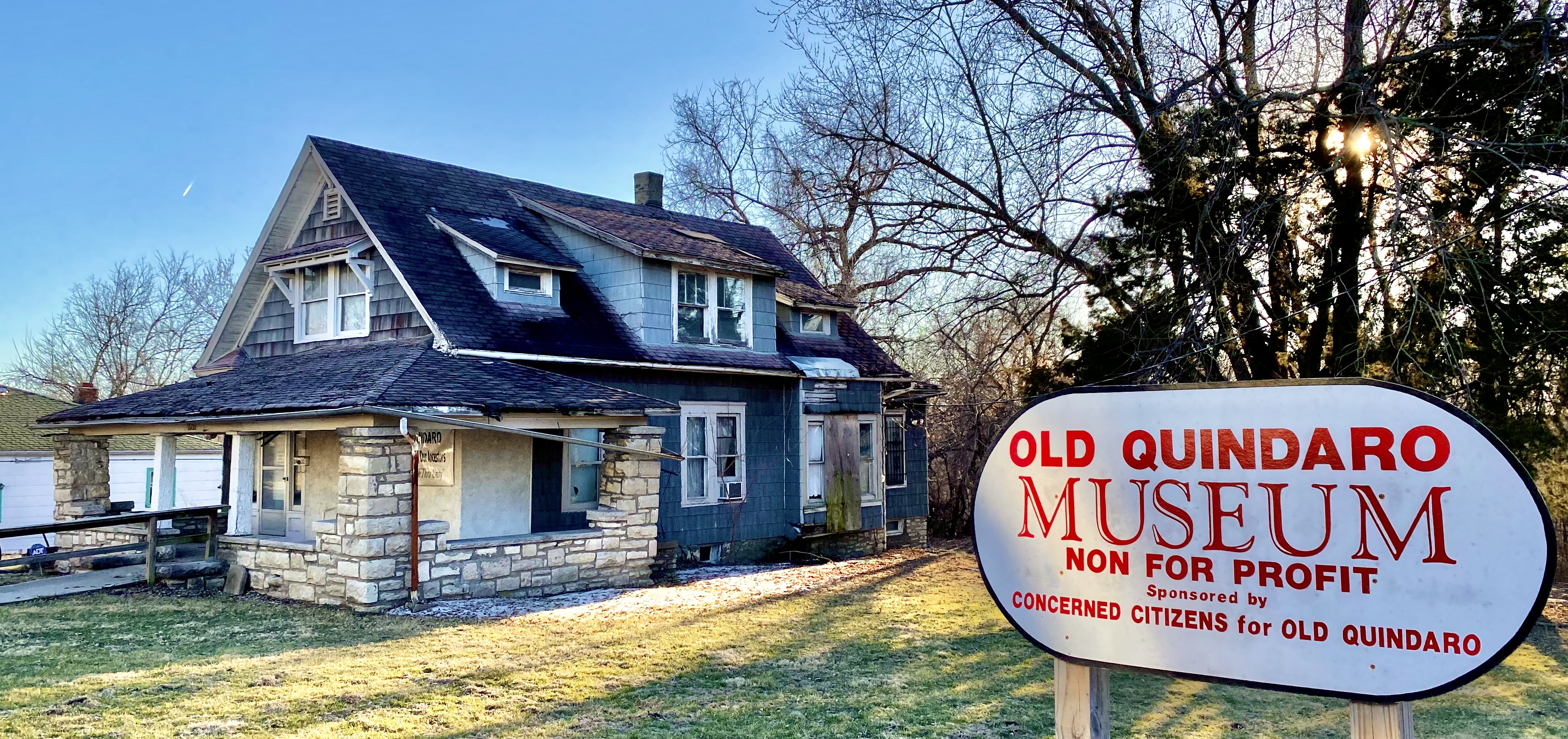
Old Quindaro Museum

With the Kansas–Nebraska Act, the Kansas Territory was opened for settlement with the promise that the settlers would vote to decide whether the state would enter the Union as a Slave State or a Free State. The New England Emigrant Aid Company (NEEAC) had already aided more than 1,200 settlers in their migration, hoping to secure Kansas as a free territory. The decision was left to the vote of the territory's residents.

Abolitionists and Free-Staters approached the Wyandot town, Wyandotte City, to establish a town company to create a Free-State port to counter the pro-slavery ports of Leavenworth, Atchison, and Kansas City, Missouri. However, just such a town company had already been founded within Wyandotte City, with the following persons representing the Quindaro Town Company:

- President: Joel Walker, brother of William Walker, Wyandot Chief and Territorial Governor
- Vice-president: Abelard Guthrie, attorney, land agent, and Wyandot by marriage to Nancy Quindaro Brown
- Treasurer: Charles Robinson, financial agent of the NEEAC and future governor of Kansas
- Secretary: S. N. Simpson, also of the NEEAC

In 1855, the land of the Wyandot Reservation had been divided among the families. The Quindaro Town Company was so named because it bought Nancy Quindaro's land allotment for the townsite. A common female name within the Wyandot, Quindaro means "bundle of sticks" or "strength through numbers", in the Wyandot language.

Quindaro was one of several competing small ports on the Missouri River. Planners seeking to establish a Free-State port noted the site's advantages:

At a point six miles above the mouth of the Kansas river, on Wyandotte Indian land, they found a fine natural rock ledge where the river ran along the bank six to twelve feet deep, making a convenient landing. Plenty of wood and rock were at hand for building purposes and fertile land was adjacent.

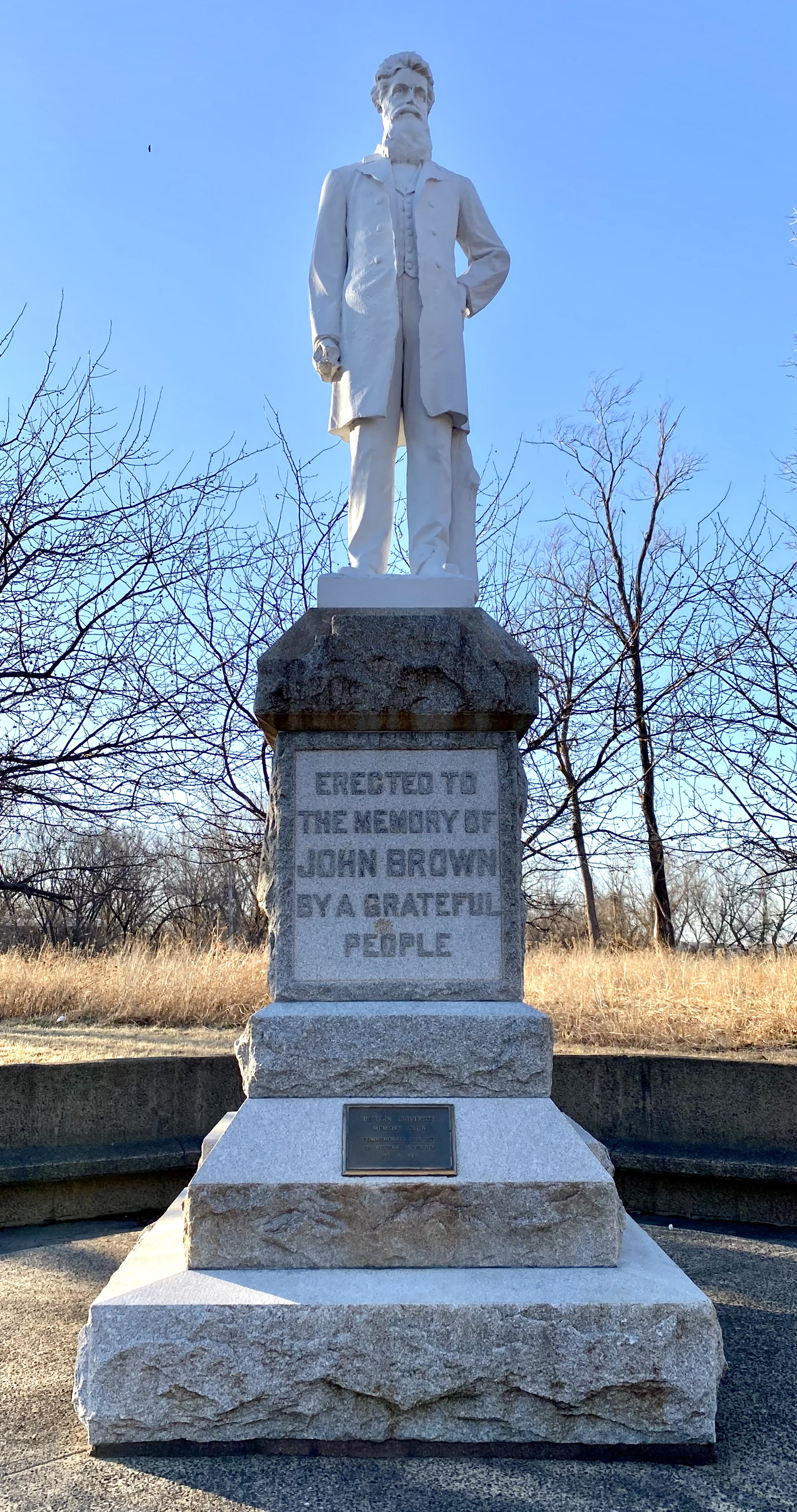
Quindaro, now Western University Memorial Plaza, whose centerpiece is a life-size white marble statue of abolitionist John Brown, as the only remaining artifact

Construction started in January 1857, and the town soon contained numerous stone houses and starts of several businesses. Its sawmill was the largest in Kansas. The lower townsite near the river was the commercial core, and most residences were higher on the bluff, at the upper townsite. In the first year, there were 100 buildings completed, many of stone and brick, "including hotels, Dry Goods, Hardware and Grocery stores, a Church [two churches] and School house". Tribal natives living there were not dispossessed and became a part of Quindaro.

John Morgan Walden was one of many young men attracted to Quindaro, where he founded a Free-Soil paper called Quindaro Chindowan. The name Chindowan was a Wyandot word for "leader". Walden also was a missionary to freedmen and later became a bishop in the Methodist Church.

=== Underground Railroad ===
After the Kansas–Nebraska Act was passed in 1854, a western branch of the Underground Railroad was developed in Kansas. Quindaro was linked to this and the Lane Trail. It provided a new route of escape for slaves from Missouri. It was most important in the years before Kansas was established as a free state in 1861. Quindaro became a legendary port for fugitive slaves and, later, blacks arriving as contraband (escapees) during the American Civil War.

Clarina Nichols was a writer for the Quindaro Chindowan, a friend of Susan B. Anthony, and fellow crusader for the rights of women and children. She was an important Conductor and "Station Master" of the Underground Railroad in Quindaro. She left a letter about a time when a freedom seeker named Caroline was brought to her house. Fourteen slave hunters, including her slave master, were camped on the edge of town and looking for her. Caroline was hidden in an empty and elaborately disguised cistern overnight, and then sent on the road north as soon as it was safe.

=== Decline ===
Having reached a peak population of 600, the booming commercial townsite quickly went bust due to a nationwide economic depression, and a failed campaign to attract a railroad. With the American Civil War, the Union Army recruited away many young men, and only few farming families stayed. The lower town site at the riverside was largely abandoned. Later African-American arrivals settled in the upper town on the bluff. The economy declined because of speculation in Kansas, and in 1862 the legislature withdrew the town charter, putting the town corporation out of business.

Difficulties in reaching the interior from below the bluff hampered commerce, and changes after the war reduced the need for the port. In addition, the topography was difficult, surrounding Wyandot land limited expansion, and problems with land titles inhibited growth. After being abandoned, the early lower commercial townsite became overgrown, with some areas covered by earth falling from the bluffs. Historians recall it as a ghost town. In the early 20th century, all of the townsite was incorporated into Kansas City, Kansas.

== Western University ==
Even before the war ended, however, Eben Blachly, a Presbyterian, in 1862 started classes in his home for the children of former slaves. The Reverend Eben Blachly had been a farmer in Dane County, Wisconsin, one of the early pioneers who had migrated from Pennsylvania. According to Blachly family legend, he was nearly hung as a "Northern spy" while trying to find his oldest son, a Union soldier who had been captured by the Confederates. With the noose around his neck he asked to say some final words, a wish that was granted by the rebels. After praying out loud for the welfare of their souls (the rebels were about to hang an innocent man), they took the noose off his neck and sent him home to Wisconsin. This traumatic experience, apparently, led him to dedicate his life to helping former slaves by organizing the Quindaro Freedman's School (later Western University), which was chartered in 1867, and which he ran until his death in 1877. It was a historically black university (HBCU) started at the upper town site of Quindaro. Its principal in 1872, when the state legislature added a four-year normal school, was Charles Henry Langston, a leading black abolitionist and activist, educator, and politician in Ohio and Kansas.

In the early 20th century, Western University became known for its outstanding music program. Music historian Helen Walker-Hill, writing in the Black Music Journal, states that "Western University at Quindaro, Kansas, was probably the earliest black school west of the Mississippi and the best black musical training center in the Midwest for almost thirty years during the 1900s through the 1920s."

In the early 1900s, Western University added a full industrial curriculum, with buildings to house livestock and another for a laundry. Later a building was added for teaching auto mechanics and repair. The university closed in 1943, and aside from its statue of abolitionist John Brown, nothing but cornerstones of some early buildings remains. Some buildings were lost to fire, others to demolition as sites were redeveloped. The last structures remaining were three faculty houses, which were demolished near the end of the 20th century. One houses the Old Quindaro Museum. The Quindaro Underground Railroad Museum is located nearby in the Vernon Multipurpose Center, the former Quindaro Colored School.

== Archeological and oral history projects ==
An archaeological study in 1987–1988 for a public project revealed the remains of the 1850s townsite. The foundations of 20 main buildings, two outbuildings, three wells, and one cistern were found. From original maps, newspapers, and letters, researchers know other structures existed. Because of the significance of the town, the townsite has been designated an archaeological district on the National Register of Historic Places. A number of public history projects have been undertaken to engage the public and share the discoveries.

In 1993, Kansas State University, in cooperation with the Mayor's Underground Railroad Advisory Commission and the Quindaro Town Preservation Society, commissioned graduate students to develop proposals for a park to incorporate the ruins and archaeology of Quindaro. Their 13 proposals were presented at a major public meeting, displayed at the state capitol rotunda, and presented at numerous venues around the state. While no consensus formed on how to develop a park, the plans were successful in engaging the public and teaching history.

In 1996, the University of Kansas sponsored an oral history project, in which more than a dozen professors interviewed those among the nearby African-American community for their family accounts of Quindaro. The history and legends of the settlement lived in stories told by their descendants and friends. Because of the brief life of Quindaro, it was little documented in written records. Public history projects have identified some new sources.

In December 2007, the Kansas Humanities Council awarded a grant to the Concerned Citizens of Old Quindaro, Kansas City, for In Unity There is Strength: The African American Experience, an exhibit to interpret the history of former slaves who escaped to Quindaro from across the Missouri River in the mid-19th century. The exhibit was to cover religious, educational, and business elements of the community they created.

In 2018, Quindaro community stakeholders including historians, archeologists, scholars, and activists began resolving decades of struggle over how to manage the historical site.
