= Lincoln Blue Tigers football =

American college football team

- First season: 1896; 130 years ago
- Athletic director: Tim Abney
- Head coach: Vacant
- Location: Jefferson City, Missouri
- Stadium: Dwight T. Reed Stadium (capacity: 5,500)
- NCAA division: Division II
- Conference: Great Lakes Valley Conference
- Colors: Navy blue and white
- All-time record: 248–453–25 (.359)
- Bowl record: 1–1–0 (.500)

National championships
- Claimed: 0

Conference championships
- 7
- Website: lubluetigers.com

The Lincoln Blue Tigers football program represents Lincoln University in college football and competes in the Division II level of the National Collegiate Athletic Association (NCAA). In 2014, Lincoln became an affiliate member of the Great Lakes Valley Conference, returning to Mid-America Intercollegiate Athletics Association in 2019. Lincoln competed in the Mid-America Intercollegiate Athletics Association from 1970 to 1989 and 2011 to 2013, while primarily remaining as member of that conference. LU's home games are played at Dwight T. Reed Stadium in Jefferson City, Missouri. The programs maintains an all time record of 248–453–25.

== Conference affiliations ==
- 1896–1931: Independent
- 1932–1969: Midwest Athletic Association
- 1970–1989: Missouri Intercollegiate Athletic Association
- 1990–1999: No team
- 2000: Central States Football League
- 2001–2005: NCAA Division II Independent
- 2006–2009: Great Lakes Football Conference
- 2010: NCAA Division II Independent
- 2011–2013: Mid-America Intercollegiate Athletics Association
- 2014–2018: Great Lakes Valley Conference
- 2019–2022: Mid-America Intercollegiate Athletics Association
- 2023: NCAA Division II Independent
- 2024–present: Great Lakes Valley Conference

== Venues ==
Dwight T. Reed Stadium
- Location: 1204 Chestnut St; Jefferson City, MO 65101
- Capacity: 3,000–5,500
- Surface: FieldTurf

Construction
- Opened: 1971

Prior to 1936, the Lincoln football team played their home games on a gridiron where Jason Gym is now located. In 1915 this field was known as West Athletic Field. The team played on Lincoln Field from 1936 to 1970. This field was home to four conference championship teams between 1952 and 1962. Lincoln Field is now called the practice field.

The Blue Tigers have played their home games at Dwight T. Reed Stadium since 1971. Reed Stadium was named for Dwight T. Reed, who coached the team from 1949 to 1972. The current capacity of the stadium is at 3,000 but the university lists it at 5,500. Reed stadium underwent renovations from March to September 2017 after the university's Board of Curators approved the $1.8 million project. The renovations included new stadium lights, an artificial turf playing surface, and a new digital scoreboard that included a video board. In addition to American football, Reed Stadium can also host soccer games. Reed Stadium also hosted Commencement before it was moved to the Linc Recreation Center in May 2017. Commencement was moved back to Reed Stadium two years later in May 2019.

== Championships ==
=== Conference championships ===
Year	Conference	Coach	Overall record	Conference record
1910	Missouri Valley Conference for Black Schools	Romeo West	2–0	1–0
1919	Western region/conference	S. L. Burlong	3–0	3–0
1952†	Midwest Athletic Association	Dwight T. Reed	8–0–1	4–0–1
1953	Midwest Athletic Association	Dwight T. Reed	8–0–1	4–0–1
1958	Midwest Athletic Association	Dwight T. Reed	7–1	3–0
1962	Midwest Athletic Association	Dwight T. Reed	5–3–1	2–0–1
1972†	Missouri Intercollegiate Athletic Association	Dwight T. Reed	9–1	5–1
Total conference/regional championships:			7	
† Denotes co-champions

== Postseason appearances ==
No.	Season	Game	Result	Opponent	Stadium	Location
1	1946	Prairie View Bowl	L 0–14	Prairie View	Buffalo Stadium	Houston, Texas
2	1958	Mineral Water Bowl	W 21–0	Emporia State	Roosevelt Stadium	Excelsior Springs, Missouri

== Retired numbers ==
Lincoln Blue Tigers retired numbers
No.	Player	Pos.	Tenure	Ref.
20	Lemar Parrish	CB	1966–1969	
30	Leo Lewis	RB	1951–1954	

== Team records and statistics ==
=== In the national polls ===
==== HBCU polls ====
Season	Pittsburgh Courier rank	ANP rank	Overall record	Conference record	Head coach
1946	7		5–3–1	1–1–1	David D. Rains
1947	13		3–4–1	1–3–1	David D. Rains
1951	10	9	7–2	1–2	Dwight T. Reed
1952	3	2	8–0–1	4–0–1	Dwight T. Reed
1953	4	3	8–0–1	4–0–1	Dwight T. Reed
1954	11	16	4–3–1	3–2	Dwight T. Reed
1955		10	5–3	3–1	Dwight T. Reed
1957	5		8–1	2–1	Dwight T. Reed
1958	5	4	7–1	3–0	Dwight T. Reed
1959		11	7–2–1	0–2–1	Dwight T. Reed
1962	16		5–3–1	2–0–1	Dwight T. Reed
1964	5		8–2	2–1	Dwight T. Reed
1968	5		8–2	N/A	Dwight T. Reed

== Seasons ==
Lincoln University Blue Tigers football seasons
