= George R. Smith Deweys football =

- First season: 1898; 128 years ago
- Last season: 1925
- Location: Sedalia, Missouri
- Stadium: Liberty Park (capacity: ~1,000)
- Conference: Missouri Valley Conference for black schools
- Colors: Purple and White
- Bowl record: 1–0–0 (1.000)

National championships
- Claimed: 0

Conference championships
- 1

The George R. Smith Deweys football program represented George R. Smith College in college football and competed in NCAA football under various conferences. The Deweys colors were purple and white. George R. Smith College fielded a team from 1898 to 1925 when the college burned down. At least one championship was claimed by the Deweys. In 1903, the Deweys beat the Lincoln Institute Tigers in the championship game of Missouri.The team folded in 1925 after a fire destroyed the University.

The Dewey's were a part of the Missouri Valley Conference for black schools. This conference included: Lincoln Institute of Jefferson City, Western University of Quindaro, Kansas, and the Kansas Industrial and Educational Institute of Topeka, Kansas, and Langston University of Oklahoma. Other members of the conference included large black high schools such as Lincoln Academy in Kansas City, Missouri, and Sumner High School in Kansas City, Kansas.

The Dewey's lone championship came in 1903 in a 17-0 victory of their rival, The Lincoln University of Jefferson City. (now known as Lincoln University) The game was said by spectators to be, "brutal and controversial." The Deweys won the game, however there were widespread allegations against the integrity of the George R. Smith football team. Reportedly, the Deweys treated the Lincoln football team with such brutality, that it culminated with gunshots and physical altercations. As a result, the Lincoln team quit after the first half of the game due to safety concerns.

== Rivals ==
In the early days of college football, segregation often barred HBCU's from competing with predominantly white institutions. Of the three HBCU's that existed in Missouri at that time, only Lincoln and George R. Smith College fielded football teams. This situation paved the way for an intense rivalry between the two HBCU's. An annually scheduled game against the only other in-state HBCU, resulted in the first attempt to crown an HBCU champion in the region.

As there was not a system in place at the time to crown a national champion, what resulted were unique playoff situations for many HBCU's. As early as 1902, the annual Lincoln–George R. Smith game was promoted as the HBCU football championship of Missouri. Regardless of whether the annual game was played for a championship title prior to 1902, it was certainly among the earliest de facto HBCU football championships in the region.

Year	Conference	Coach	Overall record	Conference record
1903	Missouri Valley Conference for black schools	N/A	2–0	2–0
Total conference/regional championships:			2 (1900 & 1903)	
