= Western University (Kansas) =

Historically black college in Quindaro, Kansas, U.S. (1865-1943)

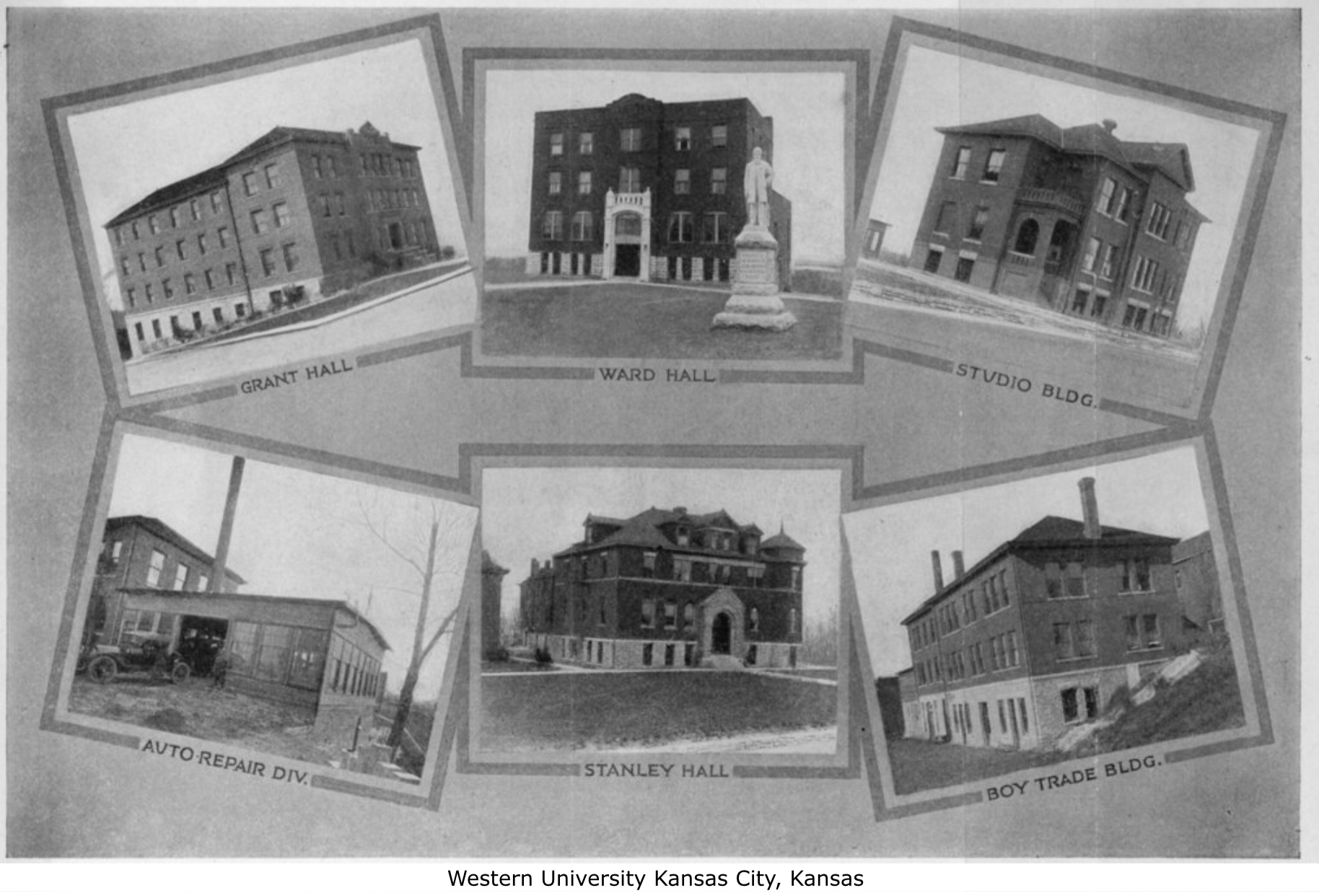
- Western University in the early 1920s, with a statue of John Brown in front of Ward Hall
- Former name: Quindaro Freedman's School
- Type: Private
- Active: 1865–1943
- Religious affiliation: African Methodist Episcopal Church
- Location: Quindaro, Kansas, US; 39.14967°N 94.65960°W

Western University was a historically black college in Quindaro, Kansas, United States. It was established in 1865 (after the Civil War) as the Quindaro Freedman's School and closed in 1943. The earliest school for African Americans west of the Mississippi River, it was the only one to operate in the state of Kansas.

In the first three decades of the 20th century, its music school was recognized nationally as one of the best. The Jackson Jubilee Singers toured from 1907 to 1940, and appeared on the Chautauqua circuit. Among the university's most notable alumni were several women who were influential music pioneers in the early 20th century, including Eva Jessye, who created her own choir and collaborated with major artists such as Virgil Thomson and George Gershwin in New York City. Nora Douglas Holt was a composer, music critic and performer who toured in Europe as well as the United States. Etta Moten Barnett became known for singing the lead in Porgy and Bess in revival and on tour.

Expanded around the start of the 20th century with an industrial department modeled after Booker T. Washington's Tuskegee Institute, the university served African Americans for several generations. It struggled financially during the Great Depression, as did many colleges, and finally closed in 1943. None of its buildings are still standing.

== History ==
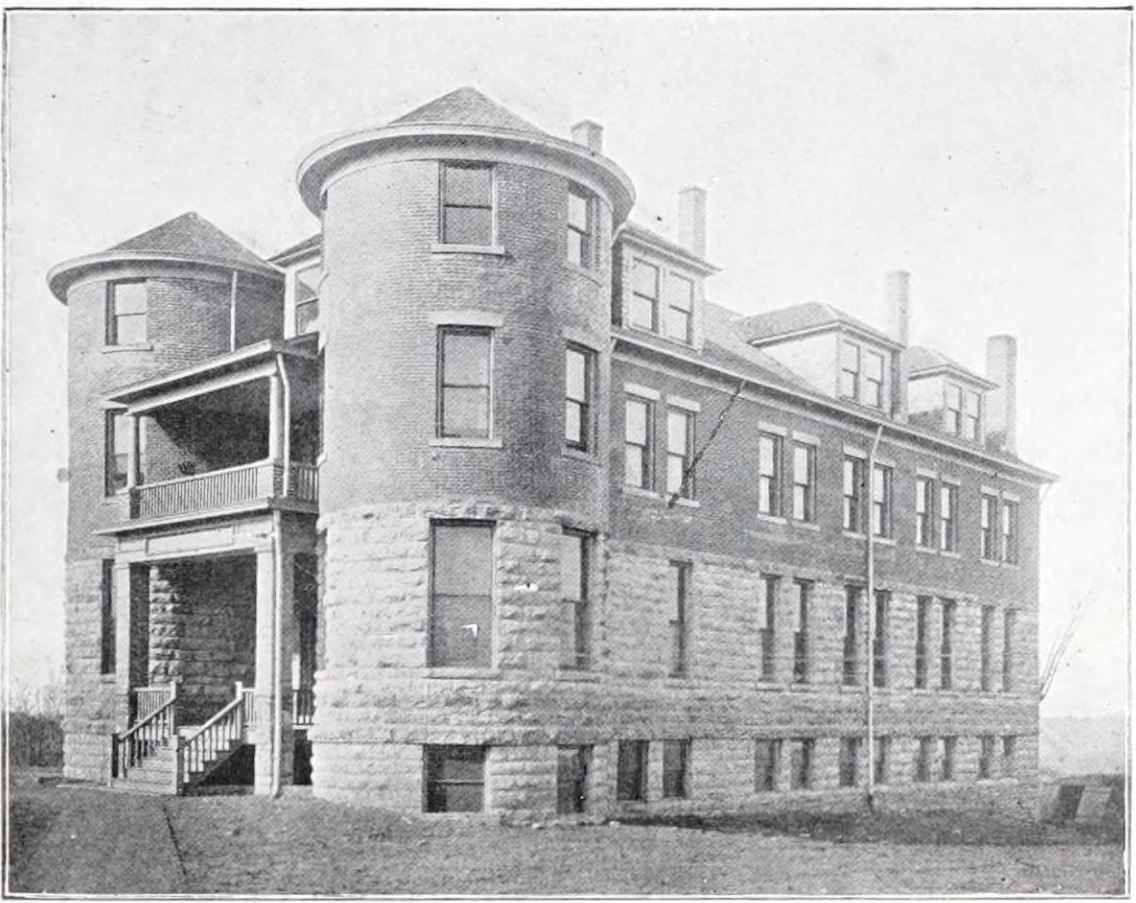
Ward Hall, c. 1910

The first classes of what became Western University were started by Eben Blachley in his home in 1862, who taught the children of freedmen. Most of the homesites of Quindaro were on the bluff; the port's commercial district was in the bottomland near the level of the Missouri River below the bluffs. The area of the Quindaro settlement was annexed by Kansas City in the early 20th century.

The town had been started in 1856 by abolitionists, Wyandot, free blacks, and settlers from the New England Emigrant Aid Company. The latter had come from Massachusetts and other northeast states to help Kansas become a free rather than slave state — a question to be settled by its voters. They started construction of buildings in January 1857 and a hundred were built in the first year. As a stop on the Underground Railroad, Quindaro absorbed or assisted fugitive slaves before the Civil War and many contrabands (fugitive slaves behind Union lines), especially from Missouri, during the war.

After the war, a committee of white men in the community, former abolitionists, organized a school to educate freedmen who had resettled in Quindaro and the Kansas City area. In 1865 the committee registered their county charter for what they called Quindaro Freedman's School. In 1867 the state legislature approved funds for the school.

In 1872 the state increased funding to establish a four-year normal school curriculum for the training of teachers. Charles Henry Langston, a prominent activist and politician (and the future grandfather of poet Langston Hughes), was named principal of the normal school. Freedmen and blacks free before the war believed that education was key for advancement of their race.

State financial difficulties caused it to reduce support following the Panic of 1873, and the school had to reduce its enrollment. Blachley continued to support it, bequeathing 100 acres (0.40 km^{2}) of land in the 1870s to help support the college that had developed from his first classes. In the 1880s, Exodusters and other migrants added significantly to the African-American population in Kansas. The college began to be active again.

In the late 19th century, the African Methodist Episcopal (AME) Conference began to help provide financial support for the school. Quindaro added a theological course and constructed Ward Hall in 1891 to accommodate it; the hall was named after a bishop of the AME Church. In 1890 the expanded college's first African-American president was appointed.

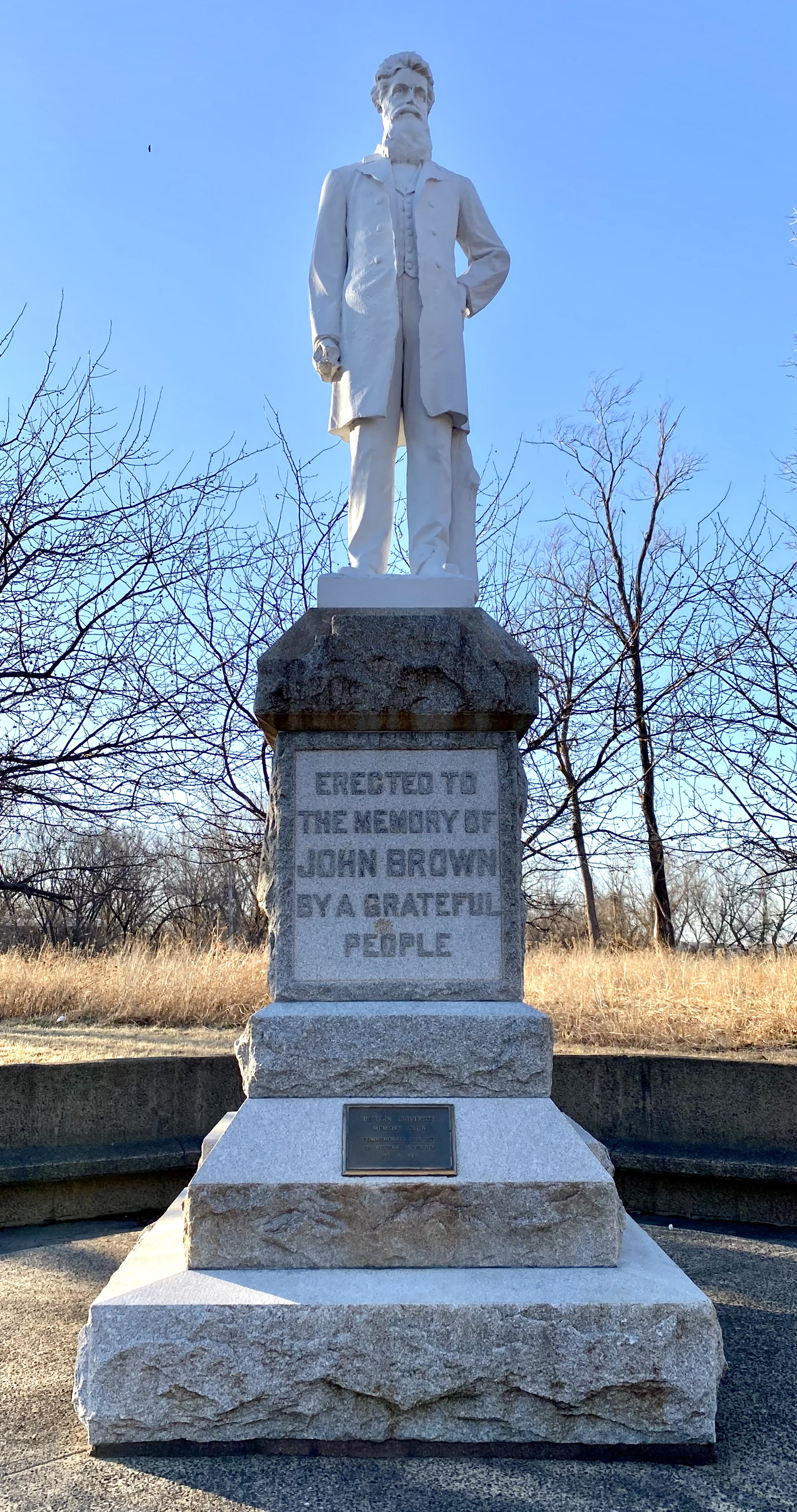
Statue of abolitionist John Brown

In about 1911, students, faculty, and churches raised $2,000 (~$48,825 in 2024) to erect a statue of abolitionist John Brown. That statue, although missing its nose and having other damage, still stands at the location of the campus.

== Programs ==
In 1896 William Tecumseh Vernon, a young AME minister, was appointed as president. He worked to increase state funding. In 1899 he gained legislative approval and financial support to add industrial education to the college, which prompted building numerous structures for the new classes, as well as dormitories. Industrial courses were on the model of Booker T. Washington's Tuskegee Institute: commercial business courses, drafting, printing, carpentry, and tailoring; later, blacksmithing and wheelwrighting were added to prepare students with desired skills for making a living. The campus was expanded with training buildings to house livestock, and another for a laundry. Later a building was added for teaching auto mechanics and repair. A central steam plant was added, as were additional dormitories. From 1898 until 1902, Charles Sumner Bowman served as the department director of industrial school. From 1916 to 1918, Inman E. Page was president.

The music school was developed after 1903 by Robert G. Jackson, who created the Jackson Jubilee Singers. Fannie De Grasse Black was instructor of pipe organ. From 1907 to 1940, the group was extremely popular. It toured the United States and Canada, performing on the Chautaqua circuit, where it helped create goodwill and raise money for the college through fundraising. In addition, the group's studies and performances helped preserve the spirituals of African-American tradition.

The late historian and Western alumnus Orrin McKinley Murray Sr. wrote about the Jackson Jubilee Singers in his 1960 book The Rise and Fall of Western University:

So great was their success in rendering spirituals and the advertising of the music department of Western University, that all young people who had any type of musical ambition decided to go to Western University at Quindaro.

The music school's most famous alumni were women who became influential pioneers of the 20th century in composition and music performance, including choral conducting. They included Nora Douglas Holt, Eva Jessye, and Etta Moten Barnett. Nora Holt was a composer, music critic and performer in the US and Europe. Eva Jessye went to New York and founded her own choir, which was featured in her collaboration with composer Virgil Thomson and writer Gertrude Stein on Four Saints in Three Acts. She was selected by George Gershwin as his choral director for his opera Porgy and Bess. Moten Barnett was a singer who made "Bess," of Porgy and Bess, a signature role after performing it in the Broadway revival and on tour. Other early alumni of the school included composer and music educator L. Viola Kinney.

In the early 20th century, Western University was lauded for its outstanding music program.

Western University at Quindaro, Kansas, was probably the earliest black school west of the Mississippi and the best black musical training center in the Midwest for almost thirty years during the 1900s through the 1920s.

In 1915, the university's monthly newspaper University Pen Point was first published.

== Closing ==
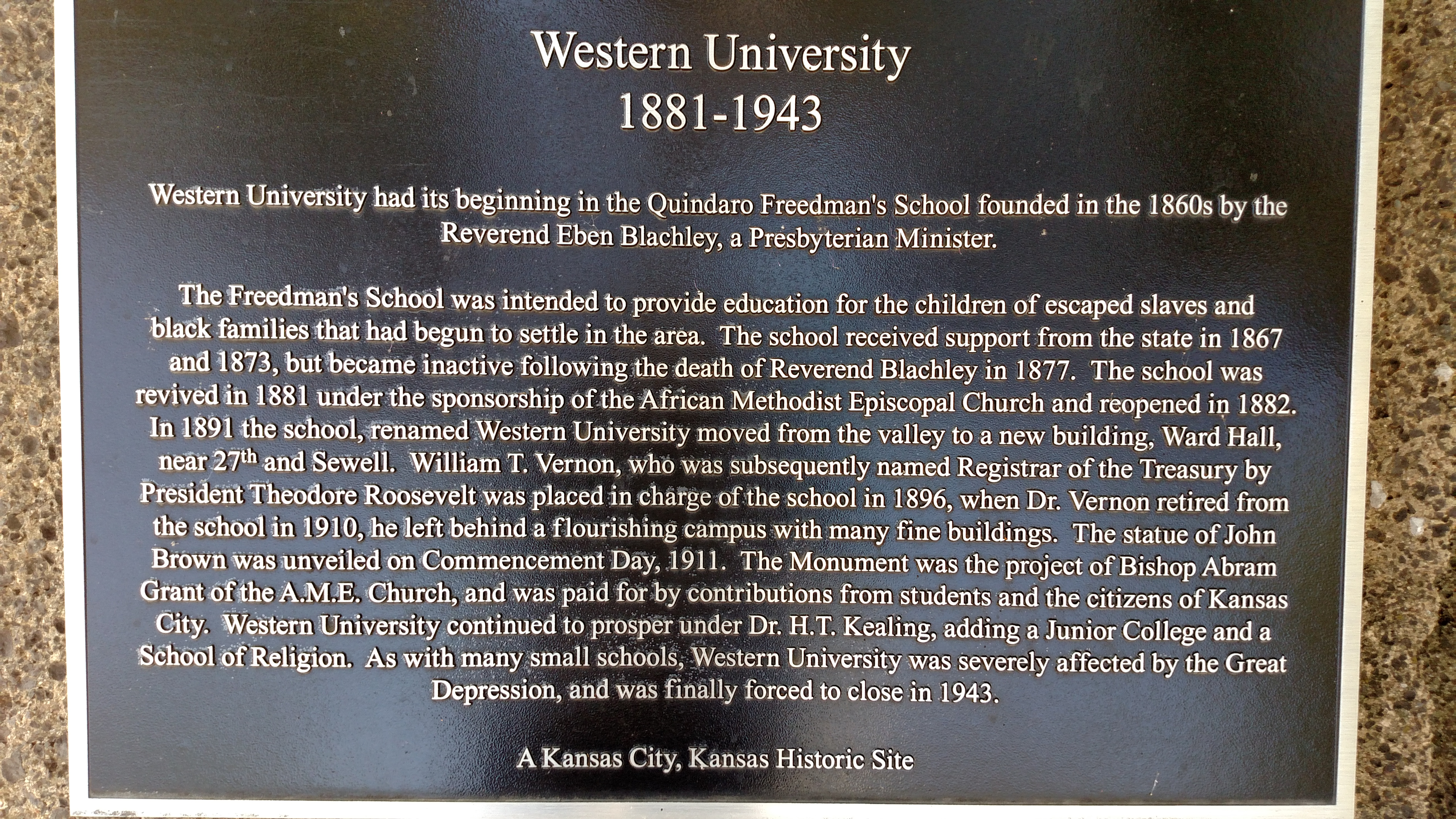
Plaque marking location of university

The Great Depression reduced available financial support, and the university faced increasing competition to attract students. Finally Western University closed in 1943.

Nothing but cornerstones of the earliest two halls still exist at the townsite. Some buildings were lost to fire, others to demolition as the sites were redeveloped. The last historic structures remaining were three faculty houses, which were demolished near the end of the 20th century. The statue of John Brown survives, and has had a little memorial plaza built around it.

== Notable people ==
Nora Holt, composer and singer
