= 1922 Paul Quinn Tigers football team =

American college football season

1922 Paul Quinn Tigers football

SWAC champion
- Conference: Southwestern Athletic Conference
- Record: 7–0–1 (4–0–1 SWAC)
- Head coach: Fred T. Long (2nd season)
- Home stadium: Jackson Field

1922 Southwestern Athletic Conference football standings
	Conf.					Overall
Team	W		L		T	W		L		T
Paul Quinn $	4	–	0	–	1	7	–	0	–	1
$ – Conference champion

The 1922 Paul Quinn Tigers football team was an American football team that represented Paul Quinn College in the Southwestern Athletic Conference (SWAC) during the 1922 college football season. In their second season under head coach Fred T. Long, the Tigers compiled a 7–0–1 record, with a conference record of 4–0–1, and finished as SWAC champion.

== Schedule ==
Date	Opponent	Site	Result	Attendance	Source
October 31	Jarvis*	Jackson Field; Waco, TX	W 23–0		
November 11	Texas College	Jackson Field; Waco, TX	W 33–0		
November 18	at Prairie View	Prairie View, TX	W 13–7		
November 25	at Wiley	Athletic Field; Marshall, TX	W 13–0		
November 30	Samuel Huston	Jackson Field; Waco, TX	W 23–6		
December 20	at Fort Worth Stars*	Panther Park; Fort Worth, TX	W 6–0		
December 25	Langston*	Jackson Field; Waco, TX	W 13–0	3,000	
January 1, 1923	Bishop	Jackson Field; Waco, TX	T 3–3	2,500	
*Non-conference game
