= 1928 Tuskegee Golden Tigers football team =

American college football season

1928 Tuskegee Golden Tigers football
- Conference: Southern Intercollegiate Athletic Conference
- Record: 6–1–4 (5–1–2 SIAC)
- Head coach: Cleve Abbott (6th season)
- Captain: Cornelius Robinson
- Home stadium: Alumni Bowl

1928 Southern Intercollegiate Athletic Conference football standings
	Conf.					Overall
Team	W		L		T	W		L		T
Tuskegee	5	–	1	–	2	6	–	1	–	4
Clark (GA)	5	–	1	–	1	6	–	1	–	1
Atlanta	4	–	1	–	1	5	–	2	–	2
Fisk	4	–	1	–	0	5	–	2	–	2
Knoxville	2	–	1	–	3	3	–	2	–	4
Morris Brown	3	–	2	–	1	4	–	2	–	1
Alabama State	4	–	3	–	1	5	–	4	–	1
Morehouse	2	–	3	–	0	4	–	5	–	1
Tennessee State	1	–	4	–	0	2	–	4	–	0
Talladega	1	–	4	–	1	1	–	5	–	1
Florida A&M	0	–	4	–	0	0	–	4	–	1
Miles	0	–	6	–	0	2	–	7	–	0
No conference champion was recognized.

The 1928 Tuskegee Golden Tigers football team represented the Tuskegee Normal and Industrial Institute—now known as Tuskegee University—as a member of the Southern Intercollegiate Athletic Conference (SIAC) during the 1928 college football season. Led by sixth-year head coach Cleve Abbott, the Golden Tigers compiled an overall record of 6–1–4 with a mark of 5–1–2 in conference play, tying for first place in the SIAC with the Clark Panthers, but no champion was recognized by the conference. Cornelius Robinson was the team's captain. Tuskegee played home games at the Alumni Bowl in Tuskegee, Alabama.

Tuskegee's loss to Clark on October 20 was the program's first defeat in five years, dating back to the 1923 season.

== Schedule ==
Date	Time	Opponent	Site	Result	Attendance	Source
September 28		Knoxville	Alumni Bowl; Tuskegee, AL	T 0–0		
October 6	2:00 p.m.	at North Carolina A&T*	World War Memorial Stadium; Greensboro, NC	T 7–7	7,000	
October 13		Florida A&M	Alumni Bowl; Tuskegee, AL	W 46–0		
October 20	1:00 p.m.	at Clark (GA)	Clark stadium; Atlanta, GA	L 9–13		
October 27		Wilberforce*^{†}	Tuskegee, AL	T 6–6	7,000–8,000	
November 3	2:30 p.m.	at Fisk	Bennett Field; Nashville, TN	W 13–7	6,000	
November 10		Morehouse	Alumni Bowl; Tuskegee, AL	W 20–0		
November 17	2:15 p.m.	at Knoxville*	Knoxville College gridiron; Knoxville, TN	W 15–0		
November 24	2:00 p.m.	at Alabama State	Cramton Bowl; Montgomery, AL	T 6–6	5,000	
November 29		at Talladega	Talladega, AL	W 21–0		
December 7	1:00 p.m.	at Atlanta	Spiller Field; Atlanta, GA	W 10–7		
*Non-conference game; ^{†}Homecoming; All times are in Central time
