= Fred T. Long =

American professional baseball player

Biographical details
- Born: January 22, 1896; Decatur, Illinois, U.S.
- Died: March 23, 1966 (aged 70) near Tyler, Texas, U.S.

Playing career

Football
- 1915–1917: Millikin

Baseball
- 1914–1918: Millikin
- 1920–1921: Detroit Stars
- 1925: Indianapolis ABCs
- 1926: Detroit Stars
- Position: Right fielder (baseball)

Coaching career (HC unless noted)

Football
- 1921–1922: Paul Quinn
- 1923–1947: Wiley
- 1948: Prairie View A&M
- 1949–1954: Texas College
- 1956–1965: Wiley

Head coaching record
- Overall: 222–148–32
- Bowls: 3–5–1

Accomplishments and honors

Championships
- 3 black college national (1928, 1932, 1945); 12 SWAC (1922–1923, 1927–1930, 1932–1933, 1944–1945, 1956–1957)

Fred Thomas "Pop" "Pops" "Big" Long (January 22, 1896 – March 23, 1966) was an American professional baseball player in the Negro leagues and a college football coach. He was the head football coach at four historically black colleges and universities in Texas between 1921 and 1965, compiling a career record of 222–148–32. He was the head coach at Wiley College in Marshall, Texas, for 35 years from 1923 to 1947 and again from 1956 to 1965. He led the Wiley Wildcats football team to three black college football national championships, in 1928, 1932, and 1945.

== Early life and education ==
Fred Long was born in Decatur, Illinois, to Hinton A. "Cook" Long and his wife Idlean Long. He graduated from Decatur High School in 1913 and entered Millikin University in Decatur in the fall of 1913. He attended for the 1913-1914 academic year, and then took the fall 1914 semester off, re-entering Millikin in the spring of 1915. He completed his Bachelor of Science degree in Commerce and Finance in June 1918, becoming the first African American to graduate from Millikin University. He was a star athlete while at Millikin, lettering in football (1915–1917) and baseball (1914–1918). The Long-Vanderburg Scholars Program at Millikin University is named for him and Millikin's first African American female graduate, Marian Vanderburg. He was joined at Millikin in the fall of 1915 by his brother, Harry Long, who had graduated from Decatur High School that spring. Fred entered the Army after graduation and served two years. In 1944 Long completed a Master's in Education from the University of Michigan.

== Professional baseball career ==
In 1920, Fred Long became an outfielder for the Detroit Stars of the newly formed Negro National League. He returned to the Stars again in 1921 and one more season in 1926 as a reserve outfielder. He also played outfield for the Indianapolis ABCs during the 1925 season, a total of four seasons in the Negro National League.

== College coaching career ==
Long's college football coaching career spanned 45 years, from 1921 to 1965. During that long career his teams captured several conference championships and at least a share of three black college football national championships in 1928, 1932, and 1945. During that same period he also served as athletic director for the colleges he worked for and often coached every sport those schools offered including track, baseball, basketball, tennis, and golf. He was elected to the presidency of the Southwestern Athletic Conference (SWAC) on three occasions. Long began his football coaching career at Paul Quinn College from 1921 to 1922, then continued at Wiley College located in Marshall, Texas, from 1923 to 1947. He coached at Prairie View A&M University in 1948 and at Texas College from 1949 to 1954. Long was fired from his post at Texas College in 1955 and succeeded by Vincent M. Gaines. In the fall of 1955, Long was working for the University Life Insurance Company of Dallas.

Long returned to Wiley in 1956 as head football coach and athletic director. His second stint there that lasted from 1956 to 1965. Long's overall record in 44 years as college football head coach was 223–148–32. (Note: National Collegiate Athletic Association (NCAA) records credit Long as head coach at Texas College in 1955.)

In 1925, Long helped inaugurate the State Fair Classic during the State Fair of Texas matching his Wiley Wildcat team against the Langston Lions each year until 1929 when Langston was replaced by Prairie View. The game was always on Negro Day of the state fair and soon was drawing in excess of 20,000 fans to the Cottom Bowl. In 1948, after Long had left Wiley and was at Prairie View, he was honored at half-time of the game and given a Buick automobile by members of the Fred Long Anniversary committee to celebrate his then 25 years of coaching in the Southwestern Conference.

On November 11, 1961, Long, with 214 coaching victories at the time, coached Wiley against Southern, led by Ace Mumford, who had 223 coaching victories, in the first known college football match-up in which both coaches had over 200 victories. Long's Wiley team won, 21–19.

The Fred Thomas Long Student Union building at Wiley is named in his honor.

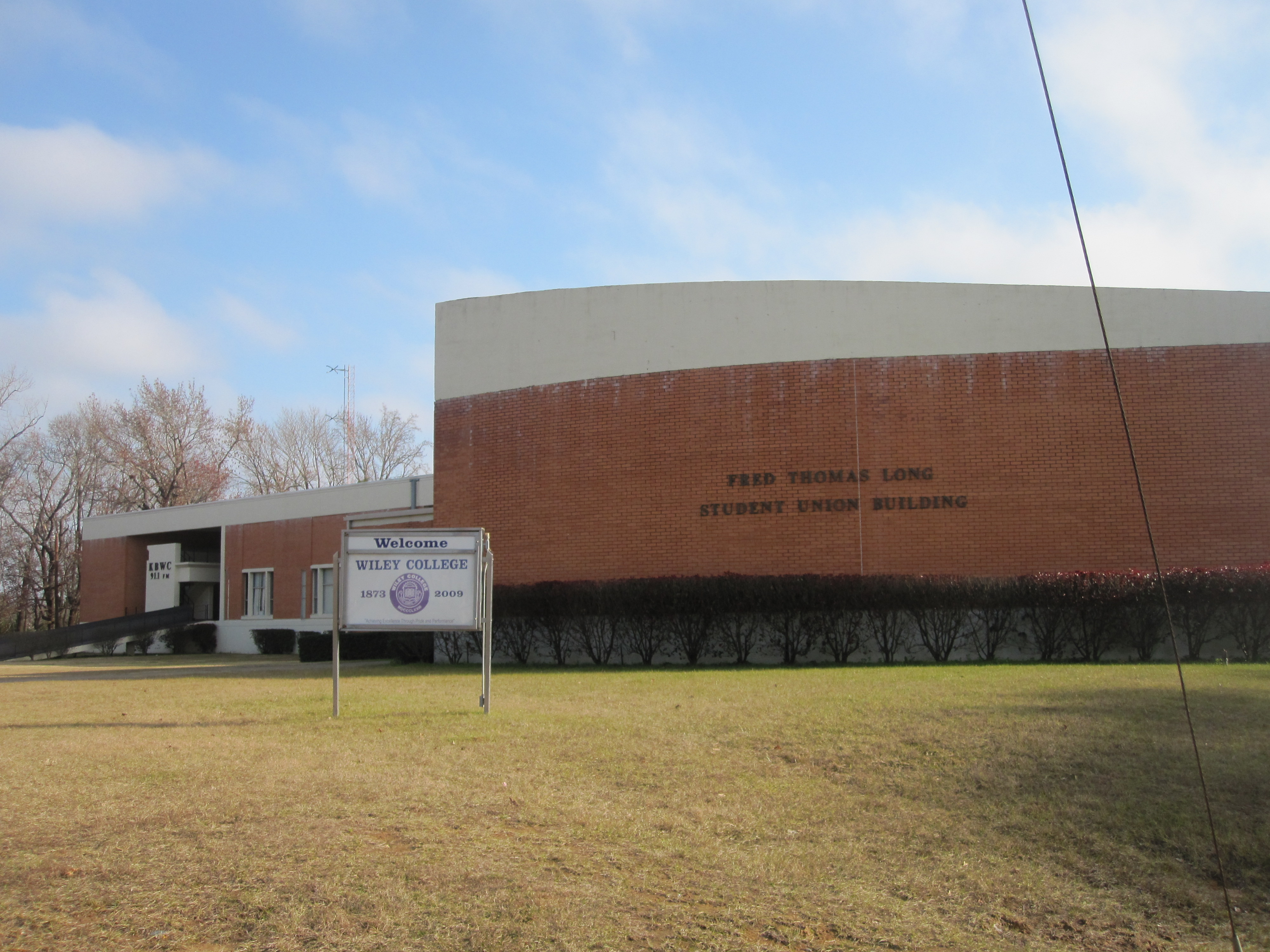
The Fred Thomas Long Student Union building at Wiley College

== Honors and death ==
In 1962, Long was inducted into the National Association of Intercollegiate Athletics Hall of Fame. He died of a heart attack, on March 23, 1966, near Tyler, Texas.

Long became a charter member of the Millikin University Athletic Hall of Fame in 1970, the Texas Black Sports Hall of Fame in 1996 and Southwestern Athletic Conference Hall of Fame in 2001. On January 11, 2010, he was honored with the American Football Coaches Association (AFCA)'s 2009 Trailblazer Award.

== Head coaching record ==
| Year | Team | Overall | Conference | Standing | Bowl/playoffs |
|---|---|---|---|---|---|
Paul Quinn Tigers (Southwestern Athletic Conference) (1921–1922)
| 1921 | Paul Quinn | 1–2 | | | |
| 1922 | Paul Quinn | 7–0–1 | 4–0–1 | 1st | |
| Paul Quinn: | | 8–2–1 | | | |
Wiley Wildcats (Southwestern Athletic Conference) (1923–1947)
| 1923 | Wiley | 6–1 | 4–1 | 1st | |
| 1924 | Wiley | 5–3 | | | |
| 1925 | Wiley | 5–1–1 | 3–1–1 | 2nd | |
| 1926 | Wiley | 6–2 | 3–2 | 3rd | |
| 1927 | Wiley | 5–1–1 | 4–0–1 | 1st | |
| 1928 | Wiley | 9–0–1 | 5–0 | 1st | |
| 1929 | Wiley | 6–1–1 | 3–0–1 | 1st | |
| 1930 | Wiley | 8–1–1 | 4–0 | 1st | |
| 1931 | Wiley | 6–3–1 | 3–1 | 2nd | |
| 1932 | Wiley | 9–0 | 5–0 | 1st | |
| 1933 | Wiley | 9–2 | 4–1 | T–1st | |
| 1934 | Wiley | 5–4–1 | 1–2–1 | 5th | |
| 1935 | Wiley | 8–0–3 | 3–0–3 | 2nd | W Prairie View |
| 1936 | Wiley | 6–3–1 | 3–2–1 | 3rd | |
| 1937 | Wiley | 5–5–1 | 2–3–1 | 5th | |
| 1938 | Wiley | 5–3–2 | 2–3–1 | T–4th | |
| 1939 | Wiley | 6–5 | 3–3 | T–4th | L Orange Blossom Classic |
| 1940 | Wiley | 3–5–1 | 1–4–1 | 6th | |
| 1941 | Wiley | 1–6–1 | 0–5–1 | T–6th | |
| 1942 | Wiley | 3–4 | 1–3 | 4th | |
| 1943 | Wiley | 3–1–2 | | | L Prairie View |
| 1944 | Wiley | 8–1 | 5–1 | T–1st | W Prairie View |
| 1945 | Wiley | 10–0 | 6–0 | 1st | W Orange Blossom Classic |
| 1946 | Wiley | 6–3–1 | 4–2 | 2nd | T Angel Bowl |
| 1947 | Wiley | 5–3–1 | 3–3–1 | 5th | |
Prairie View A&M Panthers (Southwestern Athletic Conference) (1948)
| 1948 | Prairie View A&M | 6–4–1 | 4–2–1 | 4th | L Prairie View |
| Prairie View A&M: | | 6–4–1 | 4–2–1 | | |
Texas College Steers (Southwestern Athletic Conference) (1949–1954)
| 1949 | Texas College | 2–7–2 | 2–4–1 | 5th | |
| 1950 | Texas College | 1–9–1 | 1–5–1 | 7th | |
| 1951 | Texas College | 5–3–2 | 4–1–2 | T–2nd | L Steel |
| 1952 | Texas College | 4–3–1 | 3–2–1 | 3rd | |
| 1953 | Texas College | 5–4 | 4–2 | 3rd | |
| 1954 | Texas College | 4–6 | 3–3 | 4th | |
| Texas College: | | 21–32–6 | 17–17–5 | | |
Wiley Wildcats (Southwestern Athletic Conference) (1956–1965)
| 1956 | Wiley | 6–3–1 | 5–1 | T–1st | |
| 1957 | Wiley | 10–0–1 | 6–0 | 1st | |
| 1958 | Wiley | 5–5 | 2–3 | T–4th | |
| 1959 | Wiley | 2–9 | 0–7 | 8th | L Prairie View |
| 1960 | Wiley | 2–7 | 1–6 | 7th | |
| 1961 | Wiley | 4–4–1 | 2–4–1 | 6th | |
| 1962 | Wiley | 3–5–1 | 1–5–1 | 8th | |
| 1963 | Wiley | 4–5 | 2–5 | T–6th | |
| 1964 | Wiley | 2–7 | 0–7 | 8th | |
| 1965 | Wiley | 1–7 | 0–7 | 8th | |
| Wiley: | | 187–110–24 | | | |
| Total: | | 222–148–32 | | | |
National championship Conference title Conference division title or championship game berth

== See also ==
- List of college football career coaching wins leaders
