= 1928 Wiley Wildcats football team =

American college football season

1928 Wiley Wildcats football

Black college national co-champion SWAC champion
- Conference: Southwestern Athletic Conference
- Record: 9–0–1 (5–0 SWAC)
- Head coach: Fred T. Long (6th season)
- Home stadium: Wiley Field

1928 Southwestern Athletic Conference football standings
	Conf.					Overall
Team	W		L		T	W		L		T
Wiley $	5	–	0	–	0	9	–	0	–	1
Bishop	4	–	1	–	0	7	–	1	–	0
Prairie View	3	–	2	–	0	5	–	3	–	1
Samuel Huston	2	–	3	–	0	?	–	?	–	?
Paul Quinn	1	–	4	–	0	?	–	?	–	?
Texas College	0	–	5	–	0	?	–	?	–	?
$ – Conference champion

The 1928 Wiley Wildcats football team was an American football team that represented Wiley College in the Southwestern Athletic Conference (SWAC) during the 1928 college football season. In their sixth season under head coach Fred T. Long, the team compiled an overall record of 9–0–1 with a mark of 5–0 inonfernece play, won the SWAC championship, and outscored opponents by a total of 282 to 28. Wiley and Bluefield were recognized by the Pittsburgh Courier as the black college national co-champions.

== Schedule ==
Date	Time	Opponent	Site	Result	Attendance	Source
September 21		Jarvis*	Central East Texas Fair; Marshall, TX	W 62–0		
September 29		Arkansas Baptist*	Marshall, TX	W 47–0		
October 15		vs. Langston*	Fair Park Stadium; Dallas, TX	T 7–7		
October 20	3:00 p.m.	Samuel Huston	Marshall, TX	W 26–0		
October 27		at Texas College	Tyler, TX	W 13–0		
October 29	2:30 p.m.	vs. Southern*	State Fair Stadium; Shreveport, LA	W 33–6	1,000	
November 4		at Philander Smith*	Kavanaugh Field; Little Rock, AR	W 45–0		
November 11		Paul Quinn	Marshall, TX	W 13–0		
November 23		Prairie View	Wiley Field; Marshall, TX	W 19–15		
November 29	2:30 p.m.	at Bishop	Bishop Field; Marshall, TX	W 13–0	4,500	
*Non-conference game; All times are in Central time
