= 1927 Wiley Wildcats football team =

American college football season

1927 Wiley Wildcats football

SWAC champion
- Conference: Southwestern Athletic Conference
- Record: 5–1–1 (4–0–1 SWAC)
- Head coach: Fred T. Long (5th season)
- Home stadium: Wiley Field

1927 Southwestern Athletic Conference football standings
	Conf.					Overall
Team	W		L		T	W		L		T
Wiley $	4	–	0	–	1	5	–	1	–	1
Prairie View	3	–	1	–	1	4	–	2	–	1
Paul Quinn	3	–	2	–	0	?	–	?	–	?
Samuel Huston	2	–	3	–	0	?	–	?	–	?
Texas College	1	–	3	–	1	?	–	?	–	?
Bishop	0	–	4	–	1	?	–	?	–	?
$ – Conference champion

The 1927 Wiley Wildcats football team represented Wiley College as a member of the Southwestern Athletic Conference (SWAC) during the 1927 college football season. Led by fifth-year head coach Fred T. Long, the Wildcats compiled an overall record of 5–1–1, with a conference record of 4–0–1, and finished as SWAC champion.

== Schedule ==
Date	Opponent	Site	Result	Attendance	Source
October 8	Jarvis*	Wiley Field; Marshall, TX	W 46–0		
October 17	vs. Langston*	Fair Park; Dallas, TX	L 0–27	7,000	
October 28	at Prairie View	Blackshear Field; Prairie View, TX	W 7–2		
November 4	at Samuel Huston	Samuel Huston Field; Austin, TX	W 12–4	1,500	
November 11	at Paul Quinn	Jackson Field; Waco, TX	W 25–6		
November 18	Texas College	Wiley Field; Marshall, TX	W 64–0		
November 24	Bishop	Wiley Field; Marshall, TX	T 0–0		
*Non-conference game
