= 1926 Prairie View Panthers football team =

American college football season

1926 Prairie View Panthers football
- Conference: Southwestern Athletic Conference
- Record: 5–2–1 (3–1–1 SWAC)
- Head coach: James H. Law (1st season)
- Home stadium: Blackshear Field

1926 Southwestern Athletic Conference football standings
	Conf.					Overall
Team	W		L		T	W		L		T
Samuel Huston $	5	–	0	–	0	7	–	0	–	0
Prairie View	3	–	1	–	1	5	–	2	–	1
Wiley	3	–	2	–	0	5	–	3	–	1
Paul Quinn	2	–	2	–	1	?	–	?	–	?
Bishop	1	–	4	–	0	?	–	?	–	?
Texas College	0	–	5	–	0	?	–	?	–	?
$ – Conference champion

The 1926 Prairie View Panthers football team represented Prairie View Normal and Industrial College (now known as Prairie View A&M University) as a member of the Southwestern Athletic Conference (SWAC) during the 1926 college football season. Led by first-year head coach James H. Law the Panthers compiled an overall record of 5–2–1 with a mark of 3–1–1 in conference play, and placed second in the SWAC.

== Schedule ==
Date	Opponent	Site	Result	Attendance	Source
October 16	Houston High School*	Blackshear Field; Prairie View, TX	W 44–0		
October 22	at Samuel Huston	Austin, TX	L 0–31		
October 28	Langston*	Blackshear Field; Prairie View, TX	L 0–12		
November 4	Paul Quinn	Blackshear Field; Prairie View, TX	T 6–6		
November 11	Bishop	Blackshear Field; Prairie View, TX	W 27–0		
November 19	at Wiley	Wiley Field; Marshall, TX	W 3–0		
November 25	Texas College	Blackshear Field; Prairie View, TX	W 72–12		
January 1	vs. Bishop*	Magnolia Park; Beaumont, TX	W 9–6	2,500	
*Non-conference game; Source:
