= 1927 Prairie View Panthers football team =

American college football season

1927 Prairie View Panthers football
- Conference: Southwestern Athletic Conference
- Record: 4–2–1 (3–1–1 SWAC)
- Head coach: James H. Law (2nd season)
- Home stadium: Blackshear Field

1927 Southwestern Athletic Conference football standings
| | Conf. | | | | | Overall |
| Team | W | | L | | T | W | | L | | T |
|---|---|---|---|---|---|---|---|---|---|---|
| Wiley $ | 4 | – | 0 | – | 1 | 5 | – | 1 | – | 1 |
| Prairie View | 3 | – | 1 | – | 1 | 4 | – | 2 | – | 1 |
| Paul Quinn | 3 | – | 2 | – | 0 | ? | – | ? | – | ? |
| Samuel Huston | 2 | – | 3 | – | 0 | ? | – | ? | – | ? |
| Texas College | 1 | – | 3 | – | 1 | ? | – | ? | – | ? |
| Bishop | 0 | – | 4 | – | 1 | ? | – | ? | – | ? |
$ – Conference champion

The 1927 Prairie View Panthers football team represented Prairie View Normal and Industrial College (now known as Prairie View A&M University) as a member of the Southwestern Athletic Conference (SWAC) during the 1927 college football season. Led by second-year head coach James H. Law the Panthers compiled an overall record of 4–2–1 with a mark of 3–1–1 in conference play, and placed second in the SWAC.

== Schedule ==
| Date | Opponent | Site | Result | Source |
|---|---|---|---|---|
| October 15 | Beaumont High School* | Blackshear Field; Prairie View, TX | W 44–0 | |
| October 22 | at Langston* | Anderson Field; Langston, OK | L 6–12 | |
| October 28 | Wiley | Blackshear Field; Prairie View, TX | L 2–7 | |
| November 3 | at Paul Quinn | Jackson Field; Waco, TX | W 2–0 | |
| November 11 | at Bishop | Bishop Field; Marshall, TX | W 20–7 | |
| November 18 | Samuel Huston | Blackshear Field; Prairie View, TX | W 9–0 | |
| November 24 | at Texas College | Tyler, TX | T 12–12 | |
*Non-conference game
