= 1928 Prairie View Panthers football team =

American college football season

1928 Prairie View Panthers football

Prairie View Bowl, L 0–7 vs. Atlanta
- Conference: Southwestern Athletic Conference
- Record: 5–3–1 (3–2 SWAC)
- Head coach: James H. Law (3rd season)
- Home stadium: Blackshear Field

1928 Southwestern Athletic Conference football standings
	Conf.					Overall
Team	W		L		T	W		L		T
Wiley $	5	–	0	–	0	9	–	0	–	1
Bishop	4	–	1	–	0	7	–	1	–	0
Prairie View	3	–	2	–	0	5	–	3	–	1
Samuel Huston	2	–	3	–	0	?	–	?	–	?
Paul Quinn	1	–	4	–	0	?	–	?	–	?
Texas College	0	–	5	–	0	?	–	?	–	?
$ – Conference champion

The 1928 Prairie View Panthers football team represented Prairie View Normal and Industrial College—now known as Prairie View A&M University—as a member of the Southwestern Athletic Conference (SWAC) during the 1928 college football season. Led by third-year head coach James H. Law the Panthers compiled an overall record of 5–3–1 with a mark of 3–2 in conference play, placing third in the SWAC.

== Schedule ==
Date	Time	Opponent	Site	Result	Attendance	Source
October 20		Beaumont YMCA*	Blackshear Field; Prairie View, TX	W 24–12		
October		Houston Junior College*		W 32–6		
November 2		Langston	Prairie View, TX	T 19–19		
November 3		Paul Quinn	Prairie View, TX	W 20–6		
November 12		Bishop	Prairie View, TX	L 6–26	3,000	
November 23		at Wiley	Wiley Field; Marshall, TX	L 15–19		
November 29		Texas College	Prairie View, TX	W 38–0		
December 7	2:30 p.m.	at Samuel Huston	Samuel Huston Stadium; Austin, TX	W 6–2		
January 1	2:30 p.m.	vs. Atlanta*	West End Park; Houston, TX (Prairie View Bowl)	L 0–7	6,000–10,000	
*Non-conference game; All times are in Central time
