= 1928 Florida A&M Rattlers football team =

American college football season

1928 Florida A&M Rattlers football
- Conference: Southern Intercollegiate Athletic Conference
- Record: 0–4–1 (0–4 SIAC)
- Head coach: Jazz Byrd (3rd season)

1928 Southern Intercollegiate Athletic Conference football standings
	Conf.					Overall
Team	W		L		T	W		L		T
Tuskegee	5	–	1	–	2	6	–	1	–	4
Clark (GA)	5	–	1	–	1	6	–	1	–	1
Atlanta	4	–	1	–	1	5	–	2	–	2
Fisk	4	–	1	–	0	5	–	2	–	2
Knoxville	2	–	1	–	3	3	–	2	–	4
Morris Brown	3	–	2	–	1	4	–	2	–	1
Alabama State	4	–	3	–	1	5	–	4	–	1
Morehouse	2	–	3	–	0	4	–	5	–	1
Tennessee State	1	–	4	–	0	2	–	4	–	0
Talladega	1	–	4	–	1	1	–	5	–	1
Florida A&M	0	–	4	–	0	0	–	4	–	1
Miles	0	–	6	–	0	2	–	7	–	0
No conference champion was recognized.

The 1928 Florida A&M Rattlers football team represented represented Florida Agricultural and Mechanical College for Negroes (FAMC)—now known as Florida A&M University—as a member of the Southern Intercollegiate Athletic Conference (SIAC) during the 1928 college football season. Led by Jazz Byrd in his third and final season as head coach, the Rattlers compiled an overall record of 0–4–1 with a mark of 0–4 in conference play.

== Schedule ==
Date	Time	Opponent	Site	Result	Source
October 5		Alabama State	Tallahassee, FL	L 0–6	
October 13		at Tuskegee	Alumni Bowl; Tuskegee, AL	L 0–46	
November 2		vs. Clark (GA)	Jacksonville, FL	L 0–6	
November 10		Morris Brown	Tallahassee, FL	L 0–8	
November 16	3:30 p.m.	at Bethune–Cookman*	College park; Daytona Beach, FL	T 0–0	
*Non-conference game; All times are in Eastern time
