= 1926 Wiley Wildcats football team =

American college football season

1926 Wiley Wildcats football
- Conference: Southwestern Athletic Conference
- Record: 5–3–1 (3–2 SWAC)
- Head coach: Fred T. Long (4th season)
- Home stadium: Wiley Field

1926 Southwestern Athletic Conference football standings
	Conf.					Overall
Team	W		L		T	W		L		T
Samuel Huston $	5	–	0	–	0	7	–	0	–	0
Prairie View	3	–	1	–	1	5	–	2	–	1
Wiley	3	–	2	–	0	5	–	3	–	1
Paul Quinn	2	–	2	–	1	?	–	?	–	?
Bishop	1	–	4	–	0	?	–	?	–	?
Texas College	0	–	5	–	0	?	–	?	–	?
$ – Conference champion

The 1926 Wiley Wildcats football team represented Wiley College as a member of the Southwestern Athletic Conference (SWAC) during the 1926 college football season. Led by fourth-year head coach Fred T. Long, the Wildcats compiled an overall record of 5–3–1, with a conference record of 3–2, and finished third in the SWAC.

== Schedule ==
Date	Opponent	Site	Result	Attendance	Source
October 9	at Jarvis*	Hawkins, TX	W 25–0		
October 19	vs. Langston*	Fair Park Stadium; Dallas, TX (State Fair Classic)	L 0–13	7,000	
October 23	at Texas College	Tyler, TX	W 29–0		
October 30	Samuel Huston	Wiley Field; Marshall, TX	L 0–3		
November 1	vs. Southern*	State Fair Stadium; Shreveport, LA (State Fair Classic)	W 32–6		
November 11	Paul Quinn	Wiley Field; Marshall, TX	W 30–0		
November 19	Prairie View	Wiley Field; Marshall, TX	L 0–3		
November 25	at Bishop	Bishop Field; Marshall, TX	W 33–0		
December 4	at I.M. Terrell High School*	Worth Field; Fort Worth, TX	T 6–6		
*Non-conference game
