= 1923 Wiley Wildcats football team =

American college football season

1923 Wiley Wildcats football

SWAC champion
- Conference: Southwestern Athletic Conference
- Record: 6–1 (4–1 SWAC)
- Head coach: Fred T. Long (1st season)
- Home stadium: Wiley Field

1923 Southwestern Athletic Conference football standings
	Conf.					Overall
Team	W		L		T	W		L		T
Wiley $	4	–	1	–	0	6	–	1	–	0
Paul Quinn	3	–	1	–	1	5	–	1	–	1
Prairie View	3	–	2	–	0	5	–	2	–	0
Samuel Huston	1	–	2	–	2	?	–	?	–	?
Bishop	1	–	3	–	1	2	–	4	–	2
Texas College	1	–	4	–	0	?	–	?	–	?
$ – Conference champion

The 1923 Wiley Wildcats football team represented Wiley College as a member of the Southwestern Athletic Conference (SWAC) during the 1923 college football season. Led by first-year head coach Fred T. Long, the Wildcats compiled an overall record of 6–1, with a conference record of 4–1, and finished as SWAC champion.

== Schedule ==
Date	Opponent	Site	Result	Source
	Southern*		W 6–0	
October 18	Jarvis*	Wiley Field; Marshall, TX	W 29–0	
October 25	Texas College	Wiley Field; Marshall, TX	W 20–6	
November 8	at Paul Quinn	Jackson Field; Waco, TX	L 2–6	
November 15	at Samuel Huston	Ranger Park; Austin, TX	W 40–0	
November 22	Bishop	Wiley Field; Marshall, TX	W 7–6	
November 29	at Prairie View	Prairie View, TX	W 10–6	
*Non-conference game
