= 1926 Samuel Huston Dragons football team =

American college football season

1926 Samuel Huston Dragons football

SWAC champion
- Conference: Southwestern Athletic Conference
- Record: 7–0 (5–0 SWAC)
- Head coach: William S. Taylor (1st season)
- Home stadium: Culberson Park

1926 Southwestern Athletic Conference football standings
	Conf.					Overall
Team	W		L		T	W		L		T
Samuel Huston $	5	–	0	–	0	7	–	0	–	0
Prairie View	3	–	1	–	1	5	–	2	–	1
Wiley	3	–	2	–	0	5	–	3	–	1
Paul Quinn	2	–	2	–	1	?	–	?	–	?
Bishop	1	–	4	–	0	?	–	?	–	?
Texas College	0	–	5	–	0	?	–	?	–	?
$ – Conference champion

The 1926 Samuel Huston Dragons football team was an American football team that represented Samuel Huston College as member of the Southwestern Athletic Conference (SWAC) during the 1926 college football season. Led by first-year head coach William S. Taylor, Samuel Huston won the SWAC title with a mark of 5–0 in conference play.

== Schedule ==
Date	Time	Opponent	Site	Result	Attendance	Source
October 8		vs. Dunbar Black Panthers*	Woodson Field; Temple, TX	W		
		Washington High School*		W 52–0		
October 22		Prairie View	Austin, TX	W 31–0		
October 30		at Wiley	Wiley Field; Marshall, TX	W 3–0		
November 13		Texas College	Austin, TX	W 74–0	800	
November 18		Bishop	Culberson Park; Austin, TX	W 10–6	3,500	
November 25	3:00 p.m.	at Paul Quinn	Jackson Field; Waco, TX	W 3–2		
*Non-conference game
