= 1941 Prairie View Panthers football team =

American college football season

1941 Prairie View Panthers football

SWAC champion (forfeited)

Prairie View Bowl, L 13–19 vs. Kentucky State
- Conference: Southwestern Athletic Conference
- Record: 7–1–2 (4–0–2 SWAC)
- Head coach: Sam B. Taylor (11th season)
- Home stadium: Blackshear Field

1941 Southwestern Athletic Conference football standings
	Conf.					Overall
Team	W		L		T	W		L		T
Prairie View	4	–	0	–	2	7	–	1	–	2
Langston	4	–	1	–	1	9	–	1	–	1
Southern	4	–	2	–	0	5	–	3	–	1
Texas College	3	–	2	–	1	4	–	2	–	1
Bishop	3	–	3	–	0	3	–	4	–	0
Wiley	0	–	5	–	1	1	–	6	–	1
Arkansas AM&N	0	–	5	–	1	1	–	7	–	1
Prairie View's conference title was forfeited after the SWAC ruled at its winter meeting, on December 13, that the Panthers had used an ineligible player, Whiteside.

The 1941 Prairie View Panthers football team was an American football team that represented Prairie View Normal and Industrial College—now known as Prairie View A&M University—as a member of the Southwestern Athletic Conference (SWAC) during the 1941 college football season. Led by 11th-year head coach Sam B. Taylor, the Panthers compiled an overall record of 7–1–2 with a mark of 4–0–2 in conference play, winning the SWAC title. At the SWAC winter meeting on December 13, Prairie View's title was forfeited because the Panthers had used an ineligible player, Whiteside. No conference champion is recognized for 1941.

== Schedule ==
Date	Time	Opponent	Site	Result	Attendance	Source
October 4		at Texas College	Steer Stadium; Tyler, TX	T 7–7		
October 13		vs. Wiley	Cotton Bowl; Dallas, TX (State Fair Classic)	W 32–7		
October 18		Xavier (LA)*^{†}	Blackshear Field; Prairie View, TX	W 21–6	5,000	
October 25		at Arkansas AM&N	Athletic Field; Pine Bluff, AR	W 39–14		
November 1		at Tillotson*	Austin, TX	W 33–0		
November 8		Bishop	Blackshear Field; Prairie View, TX	W 18–7		
November 22		Langston	Blackshear Field; Prairie View, TX	T 0–0		
November 29		at Southern	University Field; Baton Rouge, LA	W 19–7		
December 5	7:00 p.m.	vs. Alabama State*	Grove Hill, AL	W 26–20		
January 1		vs. Kentucky State*	Buffalo Stadium; Houston, TX (Prairie View Bowl)	L 13–19		
*Non-conference game; ^{†}Homecoming; All times are in Central time
