= 1941 South Carolina State Bulldogs football team =

American college football season

1941 South Carolina State Bulldogs football
- Conference: Southern Intercollegiate Athletic Conference
- Record: 4–3–2 (1–2–2 SIAC)
- Head coach: Oliver C. Dawson (5th season)
- Home stadium: State College Stadium

1941 Southern Intercollegiate Athletic Conference football standings
	Conf.					Overall
Team	W		L		T	W		L		T
Morris Brown $	7	–	0	–	0	10	–	1	–	0
Tuskegee	6	–	1	–	0	8	–	2	–	0
Florida A&M	4	–	1	–	0	8	–	1	–	0
Lane	4	–	1	–	1	6	–	3	–	1
Fisk	1	–	1	–	1	2	–	1	–	3
Benedict	2	–	2	–	1	4	–	4	–	1
Alabama State	3	–	4	–	0	4	–	5	–	0
Morehouse	3	–	4	–	0	3	–	5	–	0
South Carolina State	1	–	2	–	2	4	–	3	–	2
Xavier (LA)	2	–	5	–	0	3	–	7	–	1
Knoxville	1	–	3	–	2	2	–	3	–	2
Talladega	0	–	2	–	0	1	–	5	–	0
LeMoyne	0	–	4	–	1	2	–	5	–	1
Clark (GA)	0	–	4	–	2	0	–	4	–	2
$ – Conference champion

The 1941 South Carolina State Bulldogs football team represented South Carolina Agricultural and Mechanical College—now known as South Carolina State University—as a member of the Southern Intercollegiate Athletic Conference (SIAC) during the 1941 college football season. Led by fifth-year head coach Oliver C. Dawson, the Bulldogs compiled an overall record of 4–3–2 with a mark of 1–2–2 in conference play. The team played home games at State College Stadium in Orangeburg, South Carolina.

== Schedule ==
Date	Time	Opponent	Site	Result	Attendance	Source
September 26		vs. North Carolina College*	Wilson, SC	L 0–19	4,000	
October 4	2:30 p.m.	Fort Valley State*	State College Stadium; Orangeburg, SC	W 22–0		
October 11		at Lane	Municipal Stadium; Jackson, TN	L 7–14		
October 25	2:30 p.m.	at Clark (GA)	Booker T. Washington High School stadium; Atlanta, GA	T 7–7		
November 1	2:30 p.m.	Tuskegee	State College Stadium; Orangeburg, SC	L 12–33		
November 8	2:30 p.m.	Shaw*	State College Stadium; Orangeburg, SC	W 12–7		
November 15	2:30 p.m.	Knoxville	State College Stadium; Orangeburg, SC	W 20–6		
November 20	2:30 p.m.	Benedict^{†}	State College Stadium; Orangeburg, SC	T 14–14	7,000	
November 29		at Alcorn A&M*	Alcorn, MS	W 25–3		
*Non-conference game; ^{†}Homecoming; All times are in Eastern time
