= James H. Law =

American sports coach, athletics administrator, educator (1899–1966)

Biographical details
- Born: December 28, 1899; Stonega, Virginia, U.S.
- Died: June 9, 1966 (aged 66); Houston, Texas, U.S.

Playing career

Football
- 1921: Lincoln (PA)

Coaching career (HC unless noted)

Football
- 1922: Lincoln (PA)
- 1923: Samuel Huston
- 1924–1925: Morgan
- 1926–1928: Prairie View
- 1929: Houston Junior College

Basketball
- 1922–1923: Lincoln (PA)
- 1924–1926: Morgan

Baseball
- 1924: Lincoln (PA)
- 1927–1929: Prairie View

Administrative career (AD unless noted)
- 1922–1923: Lincoln (PA)

Head coaching record
- Bowls: 0–2

James Hezekiah "Johnny" Law Jr. (December 28, 1899 – July 9, 1966) was an American football, basketball, baseball, and track and field coach, athletics administrator, and educator. He served as the head football coach at Lincoln University in Pennsylvania in 1922, Samuel Huston College in Austin, Texas in 1922, Morgan College—now known as Morgan State University—in Baltimore from 1924 to 1925, and Prairie View Normal and Industrial College—now known as Prairie View A&M University—in Prairie View, Texas from 1926 to 1928.

== Playing career ==
Law attended Lincoln University in Pennsylvania., where he was the captain of the 1921 Lincoln Lions football team.

== Coaching career ==
Law began his coaching career in 1922 when he appointed athletic director and coach of football, basketball, baseball, and track and field at his alma mater, Lincoln University. In 1923, He was the football coach at Samuel Huston College—later merged into Huston–Tillotson University—in Austin, Texas. The following year, Law went to Morgan College—now known as Morgan State University—in Baltimore as head of the physical education department and athletic coach.

in 1929, Law coached football at Houston Colored Junior College—now known as Texas Southern University—in Houston.

== Later life and death ==
In Houston, Law worked as a sportswriter for the Houston Informer, the director of the Colored Branch YMCA, and the athletic director at Emancipation Park. He then coached and taught biology at Yates High School before serving as assistant principal at Miller Junior High School and Wheatley High School prior to his retirement in 1964. Law died on July 9, 1966, at his home in Houston.

== Head coaching record ==
=== College football ===
Year	Team	Overall	Conference	Standing	Bowl/playoffs
Lincoln Lions (Colored Intercollegiate Athletic Association) (1922)
1922	Lincoln	6–3	1–2	6th	
Lincoln:		6–3	1–2		
Samuel Huston Dragons (Southwestern Athletic Conference) (1923)
1923	Samuel Huston				
Samuel Huston:					
Morgan Bears (Independent) (1924–1925)
1924	Morgan	2–2			
1925	Morgan	4–1–1			
Morgan:		6–2–1			
Prairie View Panthers (Southwestern Athletic Conference) (1926–1929)
1926	Prairie View	5–2–1	3–1–1	2nd	
1927	Prairie View	4–2–1	3–1–1	2nd	
1928	Prairie View	5–3–1	3–2	3rd	L Prairie View
Prairie View:		14–7–3	9–4–2		
Total:					
