= Michael Sorrell =

College President

Michael J. Sorrell
- Born: November 11, 1966 (age 60); Chicago, Illinois, U.S.
- Education: Oberlin College; Duke University; University of Pennsylvania
- Occupation: College administrator
- Relatives: Kelie Sorrell (sister)

Michael Sorrell (born November 11, 1966) is the president of Paul Quinn College, serving since 2007.

== Personal life and education ==
Sorrell grew up in Chicago, the son of a social worker and the owner of a South Side barbecue restaurant. Sorrell attended St. Ignatius College Prep. He earned a bachelor's degree from Oberlin College, and a master's degree (M.A. in Public Policy) and law degree from Duke University. His doctorate in education is from the University of Pennsylvania.

== Career ==
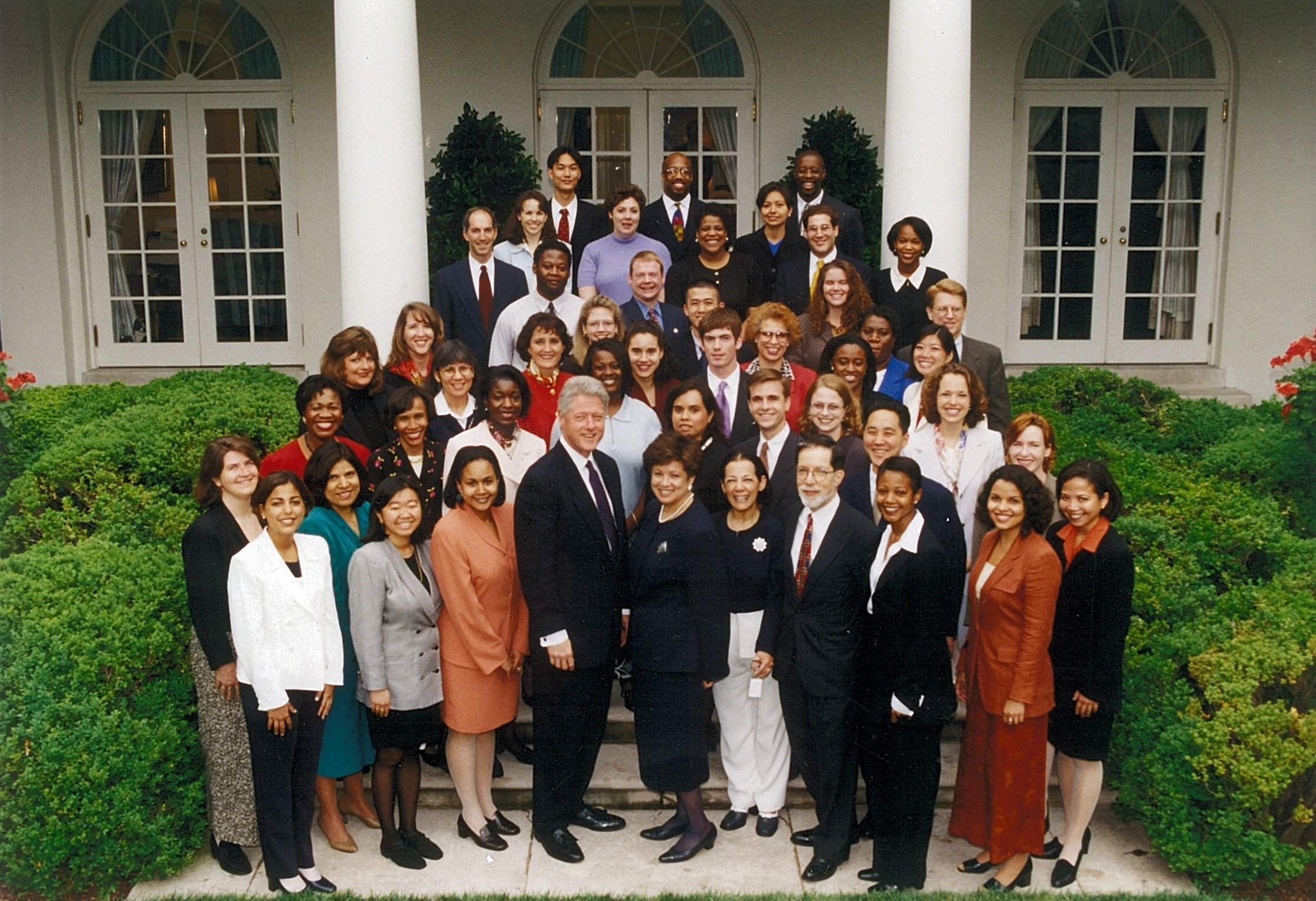
Sorrell and the Initiative staff in June 1998

Sorrell worked for numerous Dallas law firms after earning his law degree. Sorrell also worked as a special assistant in the executive office of the president during the Clinton administration, and has also worked as a public affairs consultant. After the president of Paul Quinn College left the college in 2001, Sorrell sought the position, but instead earned a spot on the college's board. Sorrell became the president of Paul Quinn College in 2007. Under Sorrell, Paul Quinn College founded the We Over Me Farm on the college's former football field. The farm is part of Sorrell's larger goal of creating a "new urban college model" and addressing what Sorrell sees as a food desert in the region around Paul Quinn College.

Sorrell was part of a potential ownership group that put in a bid for the Memphis Grizzlies. Sorrell was also involved with the sale of the Dallas Mavericks to Mark Cuban.

== See also ==
- Paul Quinn College
