= 1941 Xavier Gold Rush football team =

American college football season

1941 Xavier Gold Rush football
- Conference: Southern Intercollegiate Athletic Conference
- Record: 3–7–1 (2–5 SIAC)
- Head coach: Ted A. Wright (8th season)
- Home stadium: Xavier Stadium

1941 Southern Intercollegiate Athletic Conference football standings
	Conf.					Overall
Team	W		L		T	W		L		T
Morris Brown $	7	–	0	–	0	10	–	1	–	0
Tuskegee	6	–	1	–	0	8	–	2	–	0
Florida A&M	4	–	1	–	0	8	–	1	–	0
Lane	4	–	1	–	1	6	–	3	–	1
Fisk	1	–	1	–	1	2	–	1	–	3
Benedict	2	–	2	–	1	4	–	4	–	1
Alabama State	3	–	4	–	0	4	–	5	–	0
Morehouse	3	–	4	–	0	3	–	5	–	0
South Carolina State	1	–	2	–	2	4	–	3	–	2
Xavier (LA)	2	–	5	–	0	3	–	7	–	1
Knoxville	1	–	3	–	2	2	–	3	–	2
Talladega	0	–	2	–	0	1	–	5	–	0
LeMoyne	0	–	4	–	1	2	–	5	–	1
Clark (GA)	0	–	4	–	2	0	–	4	–	2
$ – Conference champion

The 1941 Xavier Gold Rush football team represented Xavier University of Louisiana during the 1941 college football season. Led by eighth-year head coach Ted A. Wright, the Gold Rush compiled an overall record of 3–7–1 with a mark of 2–5 in conference play. The team played home games at Xavier Stadium in New Orleans.

== Schedule ==
Date	Time	Opponent	Site	Result	Attendance	Source
September 26		at Tuskegee	Alumni Bowl; Tuskegee, AL	L 6–25		
October 4		Morehouse	Xavier Stadium; New Orleans, LA	W 7–2	2,000	
October 11	2:30 p.m.	at LeMoyne	Washington Staadium; Memphis, TN	W 12–6		
October 18		at Prairie View*	Prairie View, TX	L 6–21	5,000	
October 25		Alabama State	Xavier Stadium; New Orleans, LA	L 13–27		
November 1		at Langston*	Anderson Field; Langston, OK	L 0–6		
November 8		Morris Brown^{†}	Xavier Stadium; New Orleans, LA	L 0–6	3,000	
November 15	8:00 p.m.	vs. Wiley*	Bolton High School stadium; Alexandria, LA	W 7–6	2,500	
November 20		Lane	New Orleans, LA	L 0–6		
November 27	1:30 p.m.	at Florida A&M	Sampson-Bragg Field; Tallahassee, FL	L 0–27		
December 5		at Southern*	Baton Rouge High School stadium; Baton Rouge, LA (Louisiana State Classic)	T 6–6	8,000	
*Non-conference game; ^{†}Homecoming; All times are in Central time
