= 1941 Florida A&M Rattlers football team =

American college football season

1941 Florida A&M Rattlers football

Orange Blossom Classic, W 15–7 vs. Tuskegee
- Conference: Southern Intercollegiate Athletic Conference
- Record: 8–1 (4–1 SIAC)
- Head coach: William M. Bell (6th season)
- Home stadium: Sampson-Bragg Field

1941 Southern Intercollegiate Athletic Conference football standings
| | Conf. | | | | | Overall |
| Team | W | | L | | T | W | | L | | T |
|---|---|---|---|---|---|---|---|---|---|---|
| Morris Brown $ | 7 | – | 0 | – | 0 | 10 | – | 1 | – | 0 |
| Tuskegee | 6 | – | 1 | – | 0 | 8 | – | 2 | – | 0 |
| Florida A&M | 4 | – | 1 | – | 0 | 8 | – | 1 | – | 0 |
| Lane | 4 | – | 1 | – | 1 | 6 | – | 3 | – | 1 |
| Fisk | 1 | – | 1 | – | 1 | 2 | – | 1 | – | 3 |
| Benedict | 2 | – | 2 | – | 1 | 4 | – | 4 | – | 1 |
| Alabama State | 3 | – | 4 | – | 0 | 4 | – | 5 | – | 0 |
| Morehouse | 3 | – | 4 | – | 0 | 3 | – | 5 | – | 0 |
| South Carolina State | 1 | – | 2 | – | 2 | 4 | – | 3 | – | 2 |
| Xavier (LA) | 2 | – | 5 | – | 0 | 3 | – | 7 | – | 1 |
| Knoxville | 1 | – | 3 | – | 2 | 2 | – | 3 | – | 2 |
| Talladega | 0 | – | 2 | – | 0 | 1 | – | 5 | – | 0 |
| LeMoyne | 0 | – | 4 | – | 1 | 2 | – | 5 | – | 1 |
| Clark (GA) | 0 | – | 4 | – | 2 | 0 | – | 4 | – | 2 |
$ – Conference champion

The 1941 Florida A&M Rattlers football team was an American football team that represented Florida A&M College as a member of the Southern Intercollegiate Athletic Conference (SIAC) during the 1941 college football season. In their sixth season under head coach William M. Bell, the Rattlers compiled an overall record of 8–1 with a mark of 4–1 in conference play, shut out six of nine opponents, and defeated Tuskegee in the Orange Blossom Classic. The Rattlers played their home games at Sampson-Bragg Field in Tallahassee, Florida.

== Schedule ==
| Date | Time | Opponent | Site | Result | Attendance | Source |
|---|---|---|---|---|---|---|
| September 27 | | at Benedict | Antisdel Field; Columbia, SC | W 20–0 | | |
| October 4 | | North Carolina A&T* | Sampson-Bragg Field; Tallahassee, FL | W 19–0 | | |
| October 11 | | at Alabama State | Hornet Stadium; Montgomery, AL | W 22–0 | | |
| October 18 | | Kentucky State* | Sampson-Bragg Field; Tallahassee, FL | W 13–0 | | |
| October 25 | | Morris Brown^{†} | Sampson-Bragg Field; Tallahassee, FL | L 0–20 | 5,000 | |
| November 1 | | at Lane | College Field; Jackson, TN | W 48–0 | | |
| November 15 | | at Southern* | University Stadium; Baton Rouge, LA | W 10–7 | 5,000 | |
| November 27 | 2:30 p.m. | Xavier (LA) | Sampson-Bragg Field; Tallahassee, FL | W 27–0 | | |
| December 6 | | vs. Tuskegee* | Greater Orlando Stadium; Orlando, FL (Orange Blossom Classic) | W 15–7 | 8,200 | |
*Non-conference game; ^{†}Homecoming; All times are in Eastern time
