= 1941 Langston Lions football team =

American college football season

1941 Langston Lions football

Black college national co-champion

Vulcan Bowl, W 13–0 vs. Morris Brown
- Conference: Southwestern Athletic Conference
- Record: 9–1–1 (4–1–1 SWAC)
- Head coach: Caesar Felton Gayles (12th season)

1941 Southwestern Athletic Conference football standings
	Conf.					Overall
Team	W		L		T	W		L		T
Prairie View	4	–	0	–	2	7	–	1	–	2
Langston	4	–	1	–	1	9	–	1	–	1
Southern	4	–	2	–	0	5	–	3	–	1
Texas College	3	–	2	–	1	4	–	2	–	1
Bishop	3	–	3	–	0	3	–	4	–	0
Wiley	0	–	5	–	1	1	–	6	–	1
Arkansas AM&N	0	–	5	–	1	1	–	7	–	1
Prairie View's conference title was forfeited after the SWAC ruled at its winter meeting, on December 13, that the Panthers had used an ineligible player, Whiteside.

The 1941 Langston Lions football team was an American football team that represented Langston College as a member of the Southwestern Athletic Conference during the 1941 college football season. In their 12th season under head coach Caesar Felton Gayles, the Lions compiled an overall record of 9–1–1 with a mark of 4–1–1, placing second in the SWAC behind Prairie View, who they played to a scoreless tie on November 22. Langston finished the season with a win over Morris Brown in the Vulcan Bowl on New Year's Day 1942. The Lions shut out seven of 11 opponents and outscored opponents by a total of 147 to 45 for the season. The 1941 Langston team was recognized as the black college national champion.

== Schedule ==
Date	Opponent	Site	Result	Attendance	Source
September 27	Lincoln (MO)*	Anderson Field; Langston, OK	W 12–0		
October 4	Kentucky State*	City Field; Langston, OK	W 13–6		
October 11	at Southern	University Stadium; Scotlandville, LA	W 19–14	2,500	
October 18	Bishop	Langston, OK	W 14–0		
October 25	at Texas College	Tyler, TX	L 7–18		
November 1	Xavier (LA)*	Langston, OK	W 6–0		
November 8	at Wiley	Marshall, TX	W 7–0	3,000	
November 15	Arkansas AM&N	Langston, OK	W 20–7	2,000	
November 22	at Prairie View A&M	Prairie View, TX	T 0–0		
November 27	31st Field Artillery Battalion, Fort Sill*	Page Stadium; Oklahoma City, OK	W 36–0	2,500	
January 1, 1942	vs. Morris Brown*	Rickwood Field; Birmingham, AL (Vulcan Bowl)	W 13–0	6,000	
*Non-conference game
