= Jefferson, North Carolina =

Town in North Carolina, United States

- Town
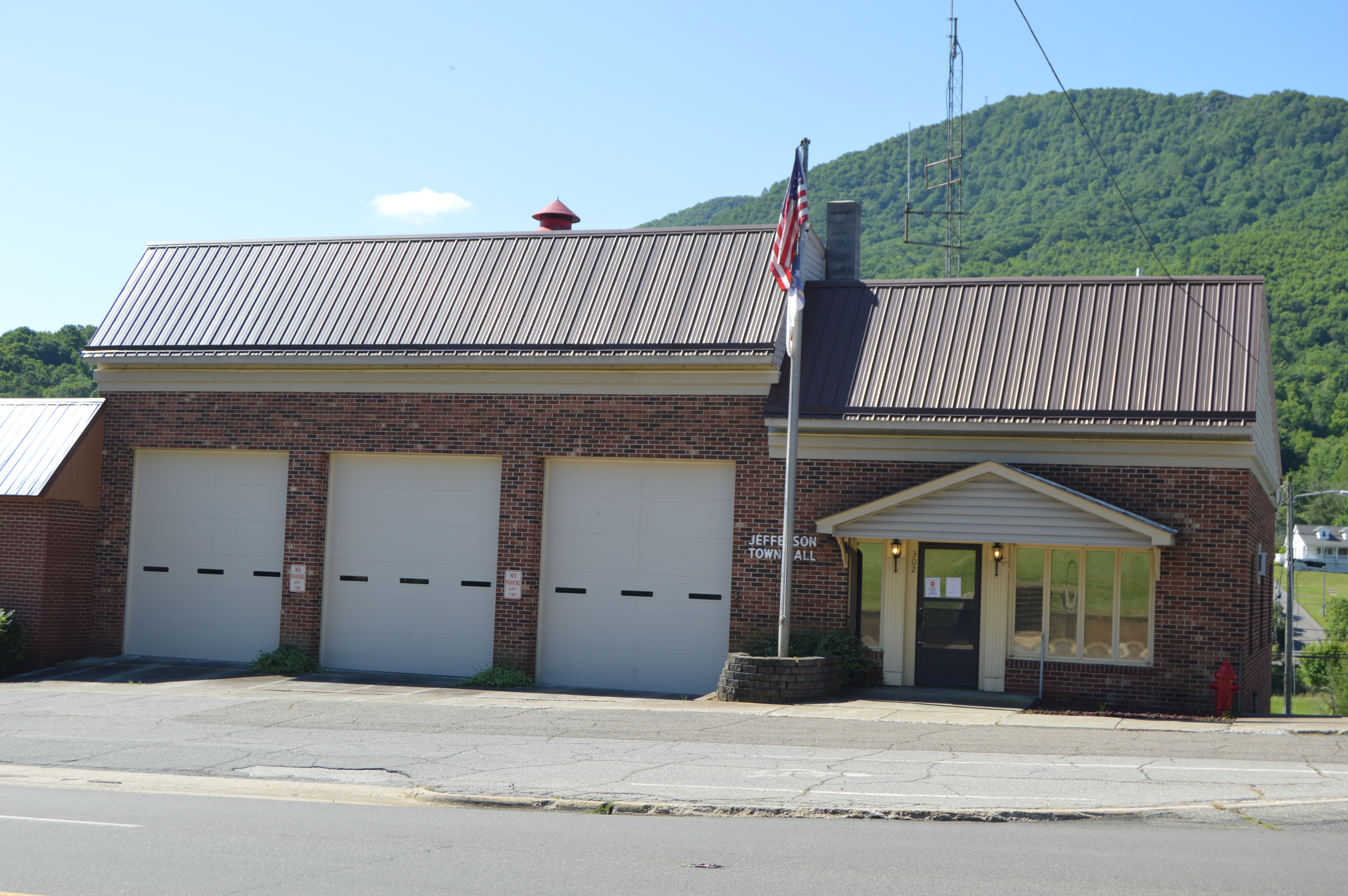
- Town hall

- Logo

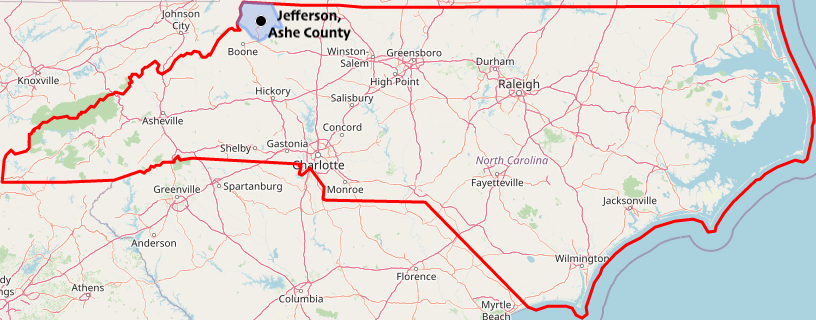
- Location within the U.S. state of North Carolina

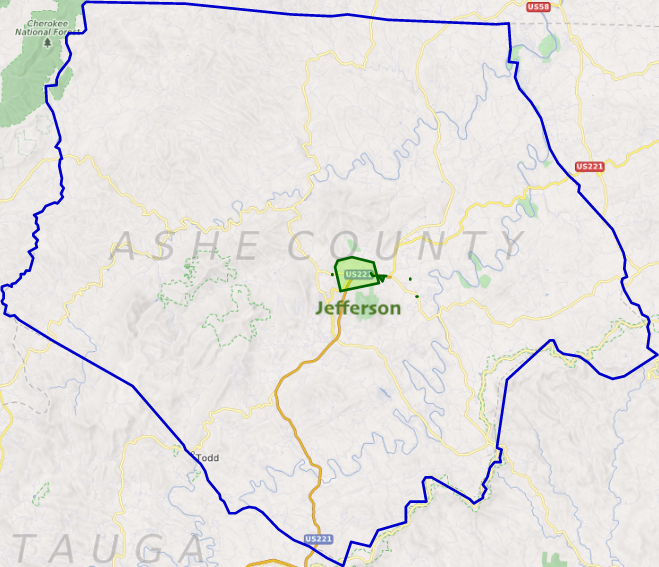
- Location within Ashe County
- Coordinates: 36°25′15″N 81°28′06″W
- Country: United States
- State: North Carolina
- County: Ashe
- Founded: as Jeffersonton (1799) as Jefferson (1799)
- Named for: Thomas Jefferson

Government
  - Mayor: Peter Eller (I)

Area
  - Total: 2.12 sq mi (5.48 km^{2})
  - Land: 2.11 sq mi (5.47 km^{2})
  - Water: 0.0039 sq mi (0.01 km^{2})
- Elevation: 2,907 ft (886 m)

Population (2020)
  - Total: 1,622
  - Density: 767.5/sq mi (296.33/km^{2})
- Time zone: UTC−5 (Eastern)
  - Summer (DST): UTC−4 (EDT)
- ZIP Code: 28640
- Area codes: 336, 743
- FIPS code: 37-34440
- GNIS feature ID: 2405910
- Website: www.townofjefferson.org

Jefferson is a town in and the county seat of Ashe County, North Carolina, United States. At the 2020 census, the population was 1,622.

== History ==
The North Carolina General Assembly created a special commission in 1799 to found a county seat for Ashe County. The commission purchased 50 acres (200,000 m^{2}) of land to form the town of Jeffersonton, later named Jefferson. It is one of the first towns in the nation to bear the name of Thomas Jefferson, who was the vice president of the United States in 1799.

The Ashe County Courthouse and Poe Fish Weir are listed on the National Register of Historic Places.

== Geography ==
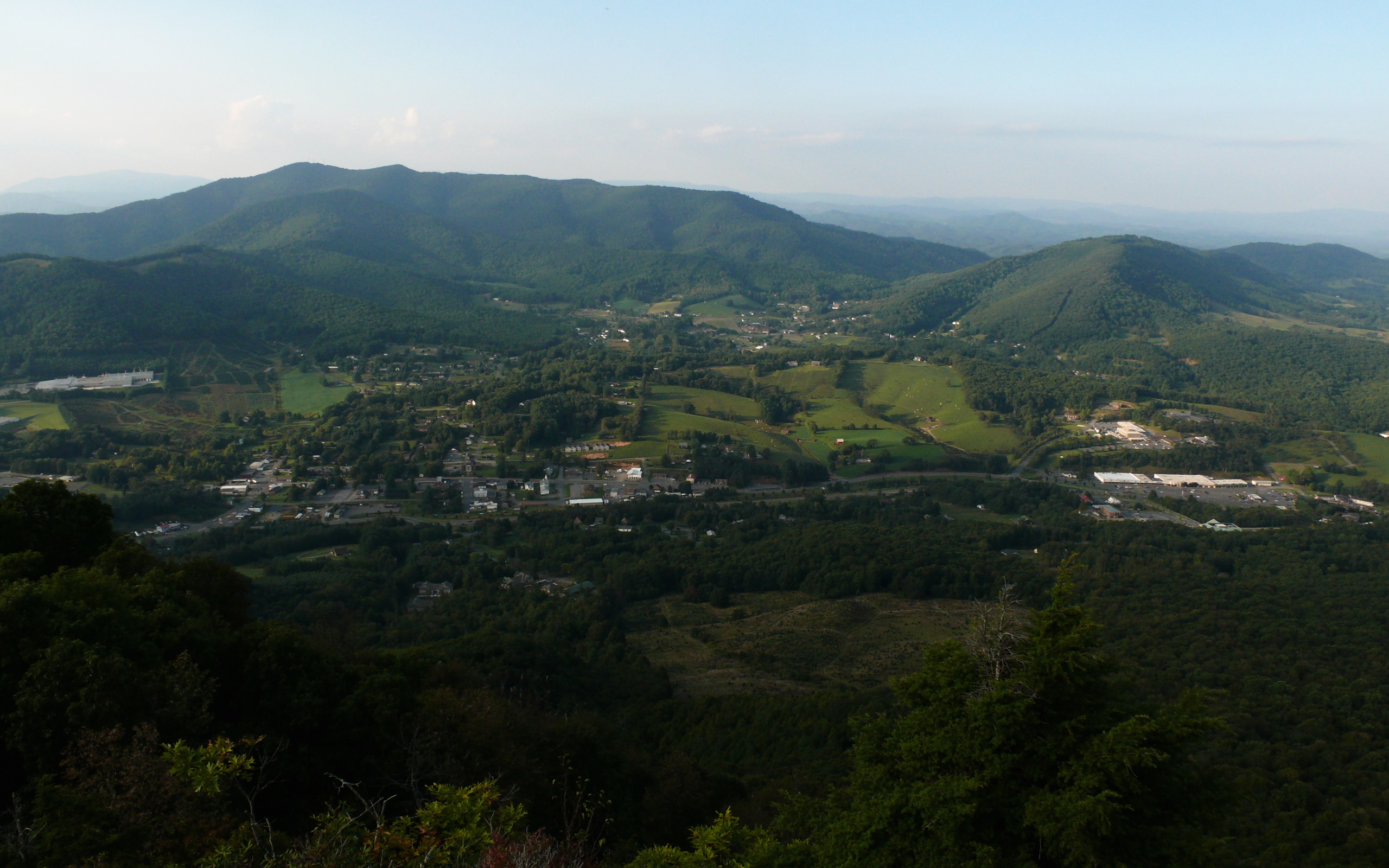
Aerial view of Jefferson

Jefferson is located in the Appalachian Mountains.

According to the United States Census Bureau, the town has a total area of 2.1 square miles (5.4 km^{2}), of which 0.0039 square miles (0.01 km^{2}), or 0.20%, is water. The New River, which is part of the Ohio River watershed and one of the oldest and most scenic rivers in the eastern United States, flows through the town.

=== Climate ===
Due to its high elevation, Jefferson has a subtropical highland climate (Köppen Cfb). During the winter, the town often experiences snow and cold temperatures akin to the northeastern United States. During the summer, Jefferson experiences cooler temperatures and lower humidity than areas to its east and south.

Climate data for Jefferson, North Carolina (1991–2020 normals, extremes 1896–present)
Month	Jan	Feb	Mar	Apr	May	Jun	Jul	Aug	Sep	Oct	Nov	Dec	Year
Record high °F (°C)	74 (23)	77 (25)	85 (29)	88 (31)	91 (33)	95 (35)	97 (36)	98 (37)	95 (35)	88 (31)	79 (26)	83 (28)	98 (37)
Mean daily maximum °F (°C)	43.3 (6.3)	46.6 (8.1)	53.5 (11.9)	63.1 (17.3)	71.2 (21.8)	78.0 (25.6)	81.0 (27.2)	80.2 (26.8)	75.2 (24.0)	65.5 (18.6)	55.4 (13.0)	47.0 (8.3)	63.3 (17.4)
Daily mean °F (°C)	32.6 (0.3)	35.3 (1.8)	41.4 (5.2)	49.7 (9.8)	58.2 (14.6)	65.7 (18.7)	69.5 (20.8)	68.4 (20.2)	62.7 (17.1)	52.0 (11.1)	42.0 (5.6)	35.7 (2.1)	51.1 (10.6)
Mean daily minimum °F (°C)	21.9 (−5.6)	24.0 (−4.4)	29.2 (−1.6)	36.3 (2.4)	45.3 (7.4)	53.4 (11.9)	58.0 (14.4)	56.6 (13.7)	50.3 (10.2)	38.5 (3.6)	28.5 (−1.9)	24.5 (−4.2)	38.9 (3.8)
Record low °F (°C)	−15 (−26)	−13 (−25)	2 (−17)	7 (−14)	22 (−6)	24 (−4)	36 (2)	33 (1)	26 (−3)	14 (−10)	−5 (−21)	−20 (−29)	−20 (−29)
Average precipitation inches (mm)	3.91 (99)	3.28 (83)	4.06 (103)	4.78 (121)	5.34 (136)	4.44 (113)	4.79 (122)	4.65 (118)	4.35 (110)	3.71 (94)	3.61 (92)	4.03 (102)	50.95 (1,294)
Average snowfall inches (cm)	4.3 (11)	3.3 (8.4)	2.9 (7.4)	0.0 (0.0)	0.0 (0.0)	0.0 (0.0)	0.0 (0.0)	0.0 (0.0)	0.0 (0.0)	0.0 (0.0)	0.2 (0.51)	3.7 (9.4)	14.4 (37)
Average precipitation days (≥ 0.01 in)	7.4	7.2	8.1	7.4	9.7	9.5	10.3	8.9	7.4	5.9	5.9	8.0	95.7
Average snowy days (≥ 0.1 in)	1.3	1.3	0.6	0.1	0.0	0.0	0.0	0.0	0.0	0.0	0.1	0.9	4.3
Source: NOAA

==== Mean coldest and warmest months ====
- January is the coldest month, with an average high of 32.6 °F.
- July is the warmest month, with an average high of 69.5 °F.

==== Extremes ====
- In December 1917, Jefferson observed a record low of −20 °F.
- In August 1925, Jefferson observed a record high of 98 °F.

== Demographics ==
Historical population
Census	Pop.	Note	%±
1860	128		—
1880	196		—
1890	413		110.7%
1900	230		−44.3%
1910	184		−20.0%
1920	196		6.5%
1930	266		35.7%
1940	304		14.3%
1950	359		18.1%
1960	814		126.7%
1970	943		15.8%
1980	1,086		15.2%
1990	1,300		19.7%
2000	1,422		9.4%
2010	1,611		13.3%
2020	1,622		0.7%
U.S. Decennial Census

=== 2020 census ===
Jefferson racial composition
Race	Number	Percentage
White (non-Hispanic)	1,416	87.3%
Black or African American (non-Hispanic)	18	1.11%
Native American	8	0.49%
Asian	13	0.8%
Other/Mixed	47	2.9%
Hispanic or Latino	120	7.4%

As of the 2020 United States census, there were 1,622 people, 615 households, and 340 families residing in the town.

=== 2000 census ===
As of the census of 2000, there were 1,422 people, 582 households, and 334 families living in the town. The population density was 738.2 inhabitants per square mile (285.0/km^{2}). There were 617 housing units, at an average density of 320.3 per square mile (123.7/km^{2}). The racial makeup was 95.43% White, 1.41% African American, 0.35% Asian, 2.53% from other races, and 0.28% from two or more races. Hispanic or Latino of any race were 3.73% of the population.

There were 582 households, of which 19.9% had children under the age of 18 living with them, 45.2% were married couples living together, 10.5% had a female householder with no husband present, and 42.6% were non-families. Of all households, 39.5% were made up of individuals, and 20.6% had someone living alone who was 65 years of age or older. The average household size was 2.02 and the average family size was 2.66.

The median age was 51 years, with 14.3% of the population under the age of 18, 6.8% from 18 to 24, 21.2% from 25 to 44, 23.1% from 45 to 64, and 34.7% who were 65 years of age or older. For every 100 females, there were 73.4 males. For every 100 females age 18 and over, there were 70.7 males.

The median household income was $22,847, and the median family income was $34,554. Males had a median income of $26,500 versus $18,929 for females. The per capita income for the town was $15,505. About 11.6% of families and 15.3% of the population were below the poverty line, including 18.3% of those under age 18 and 19.6% of those age 65 or over.

== Notable people ==
- Charles M. Bishop, academic administrator, college professor, and Methodist minister

== Notable events ==
In September 2024, Stuart Mast died near Jefferson, while in the custody of the Ashe County Sheriff's Office. His death resulted in public outcry across North Carolina, due to inconsistencies from the agency and evidence of misconduct.

In January 2025, LifeStore Bank of Jefferson was the subject of an armed robbery.

== See also ==
- Jefferson Township, Ashe County, North Carolina
