= 1941 Tuskegee Golden Tigers football team =

American college football season

1941 Tuskegee Golden Tigers football

Orange Blossom Classic, L 7–15 vs. Florida A&M
- Conference: Southern Intercollegiate Athletic Conference
- Record: 8–2 (6–1 SIAC)
- Head coach: Cleve Abbott (18th season)
- Home stadium: Alumni Bowl

1941 Southern Intercollegiate Athletic Conference football standings
	Conf.					Overall
Team	W		L		T	W		L		T
Morris Brown $	7	–	0	–	0	10	–	1	–	0
Tuskegee	6	–	1	–	0	8	–	2	–	0
Florida A&M	4	–	1	–	0	8	–	1	–	0
Lane	4	–	1	–	1	6	–	3	–	1
Fisk	1	–	1	–	1	2	–	1	–	3
Benedict	2	–	2	–	1	4	–	4	–	1
Alabama State	3	–	4	–	0	4	–	5	–	0
Morehouse	3	–	4	–	0	3	–	5	–	0
South Carolina State	1	–	2	–	2	4	–	3	–	2
Xavier (LA)	2	–	5	–	0	3	–	7	–	1
Knoxville	1	–	3	–	2	2	–	3	–	2
Talladega	0	–	2	–	0	1	–	5	–	0
LeMoyne	0	–	4	–	1	2	–	5	–	1
Clark (GA)	0	–	4	–	2	0	–	4	–	2
$ – Conference champion

The 1941 Tuskegee Golden Tigers football team represented the Tuskegee Institute—now known as Tuskegee University—as a member of the Southern Intercollegiate Athletic Conference (SIAC) during the 1941 college football season. Led by 18th-year head coach Cleve Abbott, they Golden Tigers compiled an overall record of 8–2 with mark of 6–1 in conference play. Tuskegee was invited to the Orange Blossom Classic, where the Golden Tigers lost to Florida A&M. The team played home games at the Alumni Bowl in Tuskegee, Alabama.

== Schedule ==
Date	Time	Opponent	Site	Result	Attendance	Source
September 27		Xavier (LA)	Alumni Bowl; Tuskegee, AL	W 25–6		
October 4		at Morris Brown	Ponce de Leon Park; Atlanta, GA	L 6–29	3,000	
October 10		vs. Wilberforce*	Soldier Field; Chicago, IL	W 26–7	10,000	
October 18		Benedict	Alumni Bowl; Tuskegee, AL	W 20–2		
October 24	7:00 p.m.	vs. Morehouse	Memorial Stadium; Columbus, GA	W 20–7	12,000	
November 1	1:30 p.m.	at South Carolina State	State College Stadium; Orangeburg, SC	W 33–12		
November 8		Knoxville	Alumni Bowl; Tuskegee, AL	W 30–7		
November 15		Lincoln (PA)*^{†}	Alumni Bowl; Tuskegee, AL	W 14–6	3,000	
November 20		at Alabama State	Cramton Bowl; Montgomery, AL	W 33–6	11,000	
December 6		vs. Florida A&M*	Greater Orlando Stadium; Orlando, FL (Orange Blossom Classic)	L 7–15	8,200	
*Non-conference game; ^{†}Homecoming; All times are in Central time
