= William Paul Quinn =

American bishop

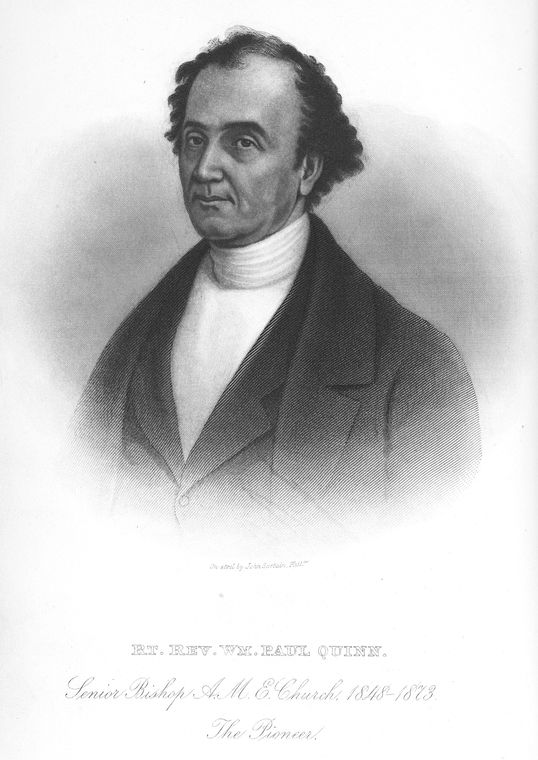
William Paul Quinn

William Paul Quinn (10 April 1788 – 21 February 1873) who said he was born in India and immigrated to the United States, was the fourth bishop of the African Methodist Episcopal Church, the first independent black denomination in the United States when founded in 1816 in Philadelphia, Pennsylvania.

In 1836, Quinn was assigned as a missionary to what was known as the Northwest, specifically Indiana and Ohio, although he also traveled to Illinois and Missouri. He settled in Richmond, Indiana as his base, founding an AME Church there and several throughout these states. In 1844 he was elected as bishop and in 1849 as Senior Bishop of the church.

== Early life and education ==
By his own account, Quinn was said to have been born in Calcutta, India to an Indian family. An 1851 affidavit said his mother was Egyptian and his father was Spanish, who were involved in the mahogany trade. He was introduced to Christianity by a Quaker missionary in India and went to England, where he took an English name. He immigrated to the United States as a young man by 1808 and became active with an AME Church in New Jersey. He was part of its founding as a denomination in 1816.

== Religious career ==
Quinn came to the US by 1808, when he became involved in the AME Church in New Jersey. He was among the founders of the denomination in 1816, the first black independent denomination in the United States. According to that account, he was ordained a deacon in 1818. His wife was Mary Jane Quinn.

In 1836 Quinn was assigned as a missionary to the Northwest Territory, and traveled throughout Pennsylvania, Indiana and Ohio to plant congregations. He is also credited with helping found the Brooklyn AME Church in Brooklyn, Illinois. Now called the Quinn's Chapel AME Church, it is thought to be the earliest AME Church west of the Appalachian Mountains. Brooklyn was an early black village founded on the Mississippi River across from St. Louis, Missouri.

Quinn settled with his wife in Richmond, Indiana, which he used as a base for his missionary work. Quinn became an elder in 1838. They founded the Bethel A.M.E. Church in Richmond, as well as similar churches in Dublin, Newport (now Fountain City), and Cambridge City, Indiana, and most of the AME churches in Ohio and Indiana.

On May 19, 1844, due to his success in planting churches in the Northwest, the General Conference of the church elected him a bishop. He became the Senior Bishop of the church in May 1849, serving until his death in Richmond on February 3, 1873. During that period, another 47 AME congregations were established from Pittsburgh, Pennsylvania to California.

Quinn was known for saying that the Divine Command theory should be accepted without question, because God could be seen as always doing the right thing; even if he does not appear to be doing the right thing, the end outcome will be good.

Quinn was buried at Earlham Cemetery in Richmond.

== Legacy and honors ==
Paul Quinn College, the oldest historically black college in Texas, was named after him. It was founded in Austin, Texas in 1872 by AME Church members to educate freedmen and later moved to Waco, Texas. In 1991 Paul Quinn College moved to Dallas, Texas, where it remains today.
