= Death of Stuart Mast =

2024 in-custody death in Ashe County, North Carolina, U.S.

- Undated photo of Mast

- Location of Ashe County within the U.S. state of North Carolina
- Location: Ashe County, North Carolina, U.S.
- Date: September 13, 2024; ~ 1:00 AM (EDT)
- Deaths: 1
- No. of participants: 4: Jacob Bledsoe; Cody Call; Stuart Mast; Johnny Retezatu
- Mast's death has been ruled as a homicide; the medical examiner ruled Mast died by asphyxiation.

Stuart Chad Mast (December 7, 1975 – September 13, 2024) was an American man who died in police custody on September 13, 2024, in Ashe County, North Carolina. Mast's death was ruled as a homicide; the medical examiner ruled he died by asphyxiation. Details from the Ashe County Sheriff's Office regarding the incident remain sparse and inconsistent. This incident, combined with prior instances of misconduct and numerous reports of abuse of power under the leadership of Sheriff Phil Howell, led to public outcry across North Carolina. The incident garnered considerable attention by the media and online attorneys.

== Background ==
Stuart Mast was at a convenience store in Jefferson, where several deputies had been monitoring him due to an unfounded suspicion of drug trafficking. Mast left the convenience store on his motorcycle, and deputies began to follow him. A traffic stop was initiated by the deputies soon after, and Mast heeded and stopped near Bower Lane, just before the Walt Sheets Bridge in Jefferson. One deputy immediately pulls his gun upon approaching Mast and another deputy removes him from his motorcycle, not allowing Mast to remove his tether. (Note: Mast had been equipped with a device designed to protect his body in the event of a crash, and the device attaches to a motorcycle via tether.) His device activated and inflated as one deputy, who was identified as Jacob Bledsoe, put Mast in a chokehold. Bledsoe then stated "I'm gonna choke you out, you hear me?". Due to the deputy's chokehold, Mast became unconscious. The deputies removed his helmet and attempted to perform lifesaving measures, including CPR and administering two doses of Narcan. Ashe County EMS arrived on scene approximately 10 minutes after Mast became unconscious. Efforts to resuscitate Mast were unsuccessful. He was later pronounced deceased at Ashe Memorial Hospital.

=== Deputies involved ===
- Jacob Bledsoe
- Cody Call
- Johnny Retezatu

== Autopsy ==
In February 2025, Mast's autopsy from the state medical examiner's office was released. His cause of death was ruled as a homicide by asphyxiation. Methamphetamine intoxication and heart disease were listed as contributing factors.

== Grand jury ==
A special prosecutor, Watauga County District Attorney Seth Banks, was assigned to review Stuart Mast's case. After reviewing the investigative file from the North Carolina SBI and Dr. J.L. McLemore's autopsy report, the case was submitted to an Ashe County grand jury on April 28, 2025. After hearing testimony and reviewing available evidence, the grand jury declined to issue an indictment in the case. Banks requested that the NC SBI close their file and did not provide further information on the case.

== Bodycam footage ==
Bodycam footage of the incident was not immediately made available to the public. North Carolina law requires a court order to release bodycam footage from law enforcement officials. In March 2025, Nick Ochsner with WBTV filed a petition in court to have footage of Mast's arrest released. Ochsner's petition was opposed by Ashe County Sheriff Phil Howell. Ultimately, the bodycam footage was released to the public. Howell's opposition has been widely viewed as an attempt to cover up wrongdoing on behalf of the deputies involved. Ironically, Howell's 2018 and 2022 campaigns for Sheriff centered around the issue of transparency.

== ACSO response ==
The response from the Ashe County Sheriff's Office regarding Mast's arrest and death has remained sparse and inconsistent. Hours after the incident, ACSO released a statement, claiming that Mast refused to comply "despite multiple verbal commands"; bodycam footage does not corroborate this account of events. Additionally in the statement, the agency claims that a deputy was hospitalized and two other deputies sustained minor injuries as a result of the incident; bodycam footage does not corroborate this claim, as no deputies appear to be injured. Attempts from multiple news agencies to contact Sheriff Phil Howell for comment on these inconsistencies were unsuccessful.

=== ACSO social media removal ===
On May 6, 2025, during a surge in controversy regarding the incident, the Ashe County Sheriff's Office removed their website and social media pages, including Facebook and Instagram. ACSO cited a significant increase in out-of-county calls to their 911 dispatch center, with callers complaining about the Sheriff's response, as well as the actions of deputies involved in Mast's arrest and death. The agency claims this led to all phone lines and social media pages becoming inoperable. The ACSO Facebook and Instagram pages were back online the following day; however, their website continued to be disabled. Approximately one week later, the ACSO website was restored.

=== May 2025 statement ===
On May 15, 2025, Sheriff Phil Howell released a public statement, claiming that the deputy's threat to choke Mast did not correlate with his death. Howell said that the autopsy conducted by the medical examiner identified 13 contributing factors, stating “the foremost being the rapid inflation of an air vest worn by Mr. Mast". The statement did not answer questions regarding Howell's objection to the public release of bodycam footage, nor his claim that deputies were hospitalized following the incident, which has been disputed by bodycam footage.

== Public response ==
Initially, minimal information was available regarding Mast's arrest and what led to his death. When the autopsy report was publicly released, questions concerning the actions of Ashe County Sheriff's Office ensued. In May 2025, bodycam footage was publicly released. On social media, calls for the removal of Sheriff Phil Howell from office began, after inconsistencies with his statements and discrepancies regarding bodycam footage surfaced. The three deputies involved in the incident also faced similar comments. Howell has not released a public apology or provided further comment on the incident.

=== Rumor of deputy transferring to the Watauga County Sheriff's Office ===
On May 9, 2025, a social media post began to spread claiming that Jacob Bledsoe, one of three deputies involved in the incident, transferred to the Watauga County Sheriff's Office due to widespread public outcry. According to a statement from the Watauga County Sheriff's Office, no deputy from Ashe County has transferred to the agency. Additionally, the Boone Police Department released a statement, stating that they have not received any applications from an Ashe County Sheriff's Office employee. The police departments of Blowing Rock and Seven Devils also released similar statements.
