= Isaac M. Burgan =

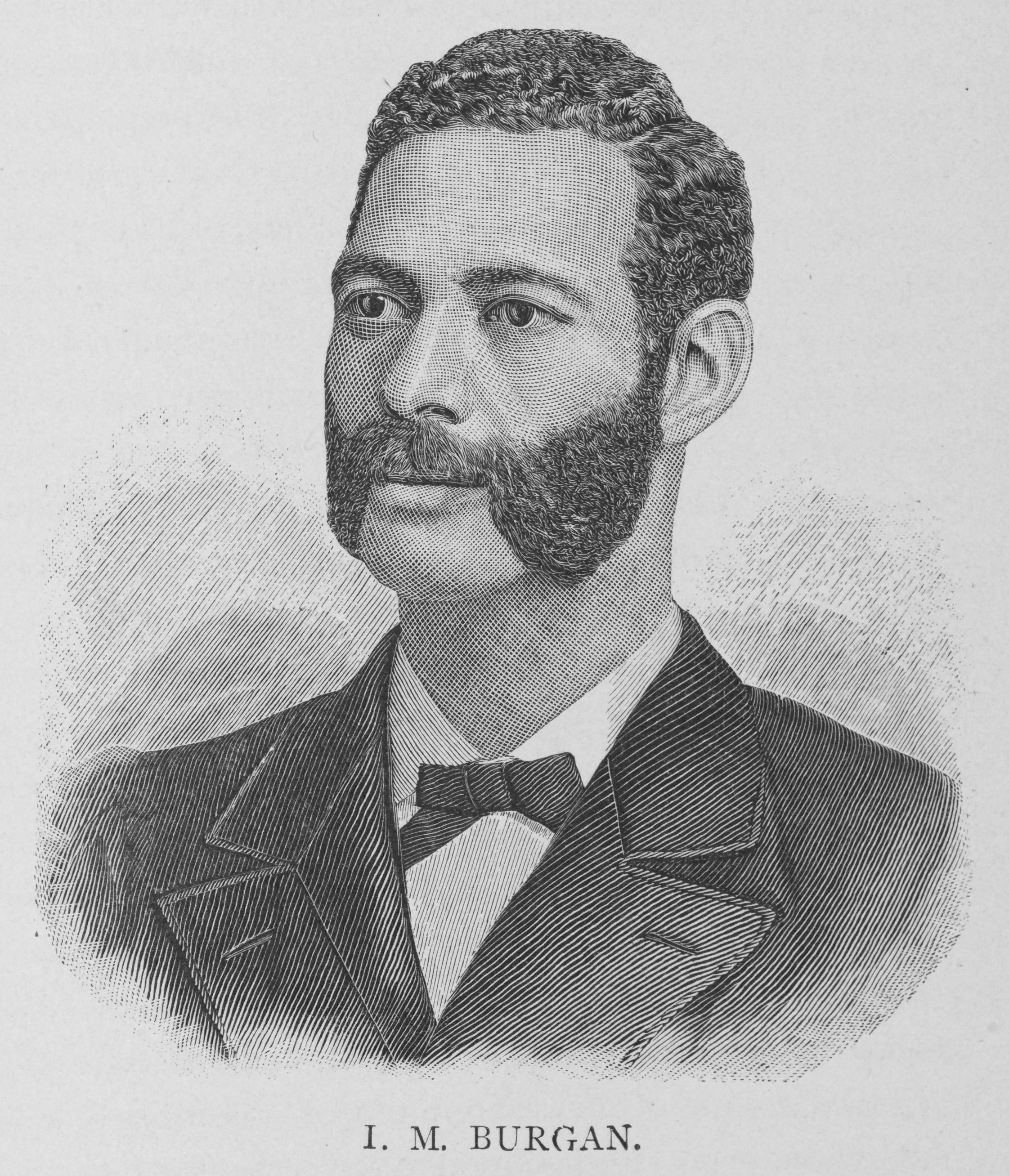
- Burgan in 1887
- Born: October 6, 1848; McDowell County, North Carolina
- Died: after 1931
- Education: State Normal School, Wilberforce University, Philander Smith College
- Occupations: Minister, educator

Religious life
- Religion: African Methodist Episcopal Church

Isaac M. Burgan was born a slave October 6, 1848 in McDowell County, North Carolina near Marion to a slave, Sylva Burgan. Held in slavery until the end of the American Civil War (1861-1865), Burgan first learned to read from reviewing the homework of white children on the farm. Burgan was regarded as too smart to make a good slave, but his owner valued Burgan's intelligence and refused to sell him as a child. However, the relationship between master and slave was not always positive. When once his mother was being whipped, Burgan struck the man whipping Sylva with a poker, stopping the whipping. Burgan fled, but when he returned was himself whipped. He then was hired out, eventually taking work in Tennessee where he began to attend school when he had spare time from his work on the railroads.

In December 1869 he moved to Bowling Green, Kentucky, to attend school there. The next summer, he took work in Livermore, Kentucky. In October 1870 he moved to Evansville, Indiana, to attend the schools taught by Rev. James Matthew Townsend there. In the fall of 1873 he enrolled in the State Normal school at Terre Haute, working as a cook and housekeeper to pay his board. In the fall of 1874 he was appointed to a position as an assistant mail agent by J. H. Walker, which further helped pay for his education. In the fall of 1875 he began teaching in nearby Lost Creek and shortly later he graduated from the State Normal School. In 1877 he began to preach in Lost Creek, and in September 1878 enrolled at Wilberforce University to study for the ministry where in his final two years he was on scholarship. While at Wilberforce he worked as a pastor in Maysville, Harveysburg, and Troy, Ohio. He graduated as valedictorian and was editor-in-chief of the college paper. He later was granted a D. D. at Philander Smith College in Little Rock, Arkansas, and an LL. D. again from Wilberforce.

On September 27, 1883, he moved to Waco, Texas, where he had been appointed principal of Paul Quinn College. His first term as president at Paul Quinn lasted from 1883-1891. He was again president from 1911-1914. During his first term, he was energetic in his work to expand the college, erecting new buildings while himself taking very little salary. In 1884 he was ordained elder of the West Texas Conference of the AME church. Burgan continued to work as a professor at Paul Quinn while not holding the title of president into the 1920s. During that time, he also served as editor of the Paul Quinn Weekly, which served the African-American population in Waco.

He was one of three former presidents of Paul Quinn who was present to celebrate the fiftieth anniversary of the school in July 1931.

== Writings ==
- Sunday, the Original Sabbath, A.M.E. Book Concern (Philadelphia, Pennsylvania), 1913
