= 1924 Paul Quinn Tigers football team =

American college football season

1924 Paul Quinn Tigers football

Black college national co-champion SWAC champion
- Conference: Southwestern Athletic Conference
- Record: 6–0–3 (3–0–2 SWAC)
- Head coach: Harry Long (2nd season)
- Home stadium: Jackson Field

1924 Southwestern Athletic Conference football standings
	Conf.					Overall
Team	W		L		T	W		L		T
Paul Quinn $	3	–	0	–	2	6	–	0	–	3
Prairie View	3	–	1	–	1	5	–	1	–	1
Wiley	2	–	3	–	0	4	–	4	–	0
Bishop	?	–	?	–	?	?	–	?	–	?
Samuel Huston	?	–	?	–	?	?	–	?	–	?
Texas College	?	–	?	–	?	?	–	?	–	?
$ – Conference champion

The 1924 Paul Quinn Tigers football team was an American football team that represented Paul Quinn College in the Southwestern Athletic Conference (SWAC) during the 1924 college football season. In their second season under head coach Harry Long, the team compiled a 6–0–3 record. The 1924 Paul Quinn team was recognized as the black college national champion. The team played its home games at Jackson Field in Waco, Texas.

== Schedule ==
Date	Opponent	Site	Result	Attendance	Source
October 17	at Wiley	Wiley Field; Marshall, TX	W 7–6		
October 23	Jarvis*	Jackson Field; Waco, TX	W 40–0		
November 6	Bishop	Jackson Field; Waco, TX	T 0–0		
November 11	at Texas College	Tyler, TX	W 10–0		
November 20	at Prairie View	Prairie View, TX	T 0–0		
November 27	Samuel Huston	Jackson Field; Waco, TX	W 23–0		
December 6	vs. Tuskegee*	Waco, TX	T 0–0	1,500	
December 25	Langston*	Jackson Field; Waco, TX	W 6–0		
January 1, 1925	Shorter (AR)*	Jackson Field; Waco, TX	W 53–0		
*Non-conference game
