= Harry Long =

American football coach (1897–1945)

Biographical details
- Born: December 28, 1897; Decatur, Illinois, U.S.
- Died: December 8, 1945 (aged 47); Tampa, Florida, U.S.

Playing career

Football
- 1916–1918: Millikin

Baseball
- 1916–1919: Millikin
- Positions: Halfback; Outfielder (baseball)

Coaching career (HC unless noted)

Football
- 1922: Langston
- 1923–1927: Paul Quinn
- 1928: Tennessee State
- 1929–1945: Wiley (assistant)

Accomplishments and honors

Championships
- 1 SWAC (1924)

Harry J. "Little" Long (December 28, 1897 – December 8, 1945) was an American college football coach and professor of biology. The brother of Fred T. Long, he was born in Decatur, Illinois and graduated from Decatur High School in 1915. He enrolled at the Millikin University in the fall of 1915, and graduated with a Bachelor of Arts degree in 1919, having majored in biology and minored in mathematics. At Millikin, played football as a halfback for three seasons, lettered in baseball four tomes, and competed in the long jump for the track and field team. After graduating from Millikin in 1919, Long took a job as the physical director of the colored YMCA in Evanston, Illinois.

Harry began his coaching career at Prairie View A&M University in 1919, and then coached at Langston University in Oklahoma in 1922 before taking over at Paul Quinn College in 1923 when his brother, Fred, left Paul Quinn for Wiley College. Harry became head football coach at Paul Quinn for the next four seasons (1923–1927). In 1924, Paul Quinn tied Tuskegee, 0–0, and earned a share of the black college football national championship. In 1928, he moved on to Tennessee Agricultural & Industrial State College—now known as Tennessee State University—in Nashville, Tennessee to serve coach the football team and head the college's biology department. He left Tennessee State in 1929 to join his brother Fred's staff at Wiley College and lead the college's biology department.

On December 8, 1945, as the Wiley Wildcats were playing Florida A&M in the Orange Blossom Classic in Tampa, Florida for the black college football national championship Long, who was still an assistant coach on his brother's staff, suffered a fatal heart attack on the sidelines during the first quarter of the game and died. The Wildcats still went on to defeat Florida A&M by a score of 32–6 and won the national title for 1945.

Long completed his Master of Arts degree in biology at Columbia University in New York in 1928 and was working on completing his doctorate at the University of Michigan before his untimely death in 1945.

== Head coaching record ==
Year	Team	Overall	Conference	Standing	Bowl/playoffs
Paul Quinn Tigers (Southwestern Athletic Conference) (1923–1927)
1923	Paul Quinn	5–1–1	3–1–1	2nd	
1924	Paul Quinn	6–0–3	3–0–2	1st	
1925	Paul Quinn	4–2–1	2–2–1	4th	
1926	Paul Quinn		2–2–1	4th	
1927	Paul Quinn		3–2	3rd	
Tennessee State Tigers (Southern Intercollegiate Athletic Conference) (1928)
1928	Tennessee State	2–4	1–4	T–9th	
Tennessee State:		2–4	1–4		
Total:					
National championship Conference title Conference division title or championship game berth
