= William S. Taylor (American football) =

American football coach

Playing career

Football
- 1924–1925: Lincoln (PA)
- Position: Halfback

Coaching career (HC unless noted)

Football
- 1926–1927: Samuel Huston
- 1928: Morgan
- 1929–1931: Lincoln (PA)
- 1933–1934: Bowie
- 1937–1941: Arkansas AM&N

Basketball
- 1928–1929: Morgan

Administrative career (AD unless noted)
- 1929–1932: Lincoln (PA)
- c. 1935: Bowie

Accomplishments and honors

Championships
- Football; 1 SWAC (1926)

William S. Taylor was an American college football and college basketball coach and athletics administrator. He served as the head football coach at Samuel Huston College in Austin, Texas from 1926 to 1927, Morgan College (now known as Morgan State University) in 1928, Lincoln University in Oxford, Pennsylvania from 1929 to 1931, Maryland Normal and Industrial School at Bowie (now known as Bowie State University), and Arkansas Agricultural, Mechanical & Normal College (Arkansas AM&N; now known as the University of Arkansas at Pine Bluff) from 1937 to 1941. Taylor was also the athletic director at Lincoln from 1929 to 1932.

Taylor's 1926 Samuel Huston team won the Southwestern Athletic Conference title. in 1937, Taylor married Amber B. L. Greene. The two had met at Bowie State Normal School while Taylor served as athletic director and Green was the school's librarian.

== Head coaching record ==
=== Football ===
Year	Team	Overall	Conference	Standing	Bowl/playoffs
Samuel Huston Dragons (Southwestern Athletic Conference) (1926–1927)
1926	Samuel Huston	7–0	5–0	1st	
1927	Samuel Huston		2–3	4th	
Samuel Huston:			7–3		
Morgan Bears (Independent) (1928)
1928	Morgan	3–4–2			
Morgan:		3–4–2			
Lincoln Lions (Colored Intercollegiate Athletic Association) (1929–1931)
1929	Lincoln	6–2–1	4–2–1	3rd	
1930	Lincoln	4–4–1	4–4–1		
1931	Lincoln	7–3	7–1		
Lincoln:		17–9–2	16–7–2		
Bowie Bulldogs (Middle Atlantic Athletic Association) (1933–1934)
1933	Bowie				
1934	Bowie	2–4–1	2–4–1	6th	
Bowie:					
Arkansas AM&N Lions (Southwestern Athletic Conference) (1937–1940)
1937	Arkansas AM&N	7–0–3	3–0–3	2nd	
1938	Arkansas AM&N	4–4–1	2–3–1	T–4th	
1939	Arkansas AM&N	6–3–1	3–2–1	T–2nd	
1940	Arkansas AM&N	3–8	0–6	7th	
1941	Arkansas AM&N	1–7–1	0–5–1	T–6th	
Arkansas AM&N:		21–22–6	8–16–6		
Total:					
National championship Conference title Conference division title or championship game berth
