= 1941 Arkansas AM&N Lions football team =

American college football season

1941 Arkansas AM&N Lions football
- Conference: Southwestern Athletic Conference
- Record: 1–7–1 (0–5–1 SWAC)
- Head coach: William S. Taylor (5th season)

1941 Southwestern Athletic Conference football standings
	Conf.					Overall
Team	W		L		T	W		L		T
Prairie View	4	–	0	–	2	7	–	1	–	2
Langston	4	–	1	–	1	9	–	1	–	1
Southern	4	–	2	–	0	5	–	3	–	1
Texas College	3	–	2	–	1	4	–	2	–	1
Bishop	3	–	3	–	0	3	–	4	–	0
Wiley	0	–	5	–	1	1	–	6	–	1
Arkansas AM&N	0	–	5	–	1	1	–	7	–	1
Prairie View's conference title was forfeited after the SWAC ruled at its winter meeting, on December 13, that the Panthers had used an ineligible player, Whiteside.

The 1941 Arkansas AM&N Lions football team, sometimes called Arkansas State, represented Arkansas Agricultural, Mechanical and Normal College (AM&N)—now known as University of Arkansas at Pine Bluff—as a member of the Southwestern Athletic Conference (SWAC) during the 1941 college football season. Led by William S. Taylor in his fifth and final season as head coach, the Lions compiled an overall record of 1–7–1 with a mark of 0–5–1 in conference play, tying for the sixth place at the bottom of the SWAC standings.

== Schedule ==
Date	Time	Opponent	Site	Result	Attendance	Source
October 4		Wiley	State College Field; Pine Bluff, AR	T 9–9		
October 11		Alcorn A&M*	Pine Bluff, AR	W 13–0		
October 18		at Texas College	Steer Stadium; Tyler, TX	L 7–36	2,000	
October 25		Prairie View	Pine Bluff, AR	L 14–39		
November 1	7:30 p.m.	vs. Bishop	Texarkana baseball club park; Texarkana, TX	L 0–35		
November 8		Philander Smith*	Pine Bluff, AR	L 12–13		
November 15		at Langston	Langston, OK	L 7–20	2,000	
November 22		Southern	Pine Bluff, AR	L 7–14		
November 27		at LeMoyne*	Memphis, TN	L 0–7		
*Non-conference game; All times are in Central time
