= 1941 Wiley Wildcats football team =

American college football season

1941 Wiley Wildcats football
- Conference: Southwestern Athletic Conference
- Record: 1–6–1 (0–5–1 SWAC)
- Head coach: Fred T. Long (19th season)
- Home stadium: Wiley Field

1941 Southwestern Athletic Conference football standings
	Conf.					Overall
Team	W		L		T	W		L		T
Prairie View	4	–	0	–	2	7	–	1	–	2
Langston	4	–	1	–	1	9	–	1	–	1
Southern	4	–	2	–	0	5	–	3	–	1
Texas College	3	–	2	–	1	4	–	2	–	1
Bishop	3	–	3	–	0	3	–	4	–	0
Wiley	0	–	5	–	1	1	–	6	–	1
Arkansas AM&N	0	–	5	–	1	1	–	7	–	1
Prairie View's conference title was forfeited after the SWAC ruled at its winter meeting, on December 13, that the Panthers had used an ineligible player, Whiteside.

The 1941 Wiley Wildcats football team represented Wiley College as a member of the Southwestern Athletic Conference (SWAC) during the 1941 college football season. Led by 19th-year head coach Fred T. Long, the Wildcats compiled an overall record of 1–6–1, with a conference record of 0–5–1, tying for sixth place at the bottom of the SWAC standings.

== Schedule ==
Date	Opponent	Site	Result	Attendance	Source
September 27	at Jarvis*	Hawkins, TX	W 34–7		
October 4	at Arkansas AM&N	Athletic Field; Pine Bluff, AR	T 9–9		
October 13	vs. Prairie View	Cotton Bowl; Dallas, TX (State Fair Classic (TX))	L 32–7		
October 27	vs. Southern	State Fair Stadium; Shreveport, LA (State Fair Classic (LA))	L 7–22	5,000	
November 8	Langston	Wiley Field; Marshall, TX	L 0–7	3,000	
November 15	vs. Xavier (LA)*	Bolton H.S. Stadium; Alexandria, LA	L 6–7	2,500	
November 22	Texas College	Wiley Field; Marshall, TX	L 0–38	1,500	
November 29	at Bishop	Bishop Field; Marshall, TX	L 7–41		
*Non-conference game
