= 1941 Southern Jaguars football team =

American college football season

1941 Southern Jaguars football
- Conference: Southwestern Athletic Conference
- Record: 5–3–1 (4–2 SWAC)
- Head coach: Ace Mumford (6th season)
- Home stadium: University Stadium

1941 Southwestern Athletic Conference football standings
	Conf.					Overall
Team	W		L		T	W		L		T
Prairie View	4	–	0	–	2	7	–	1	–	2
Langston	4	–	1	–	1	9	–	1	–	1
Southern	4	–	2	–	0	5	–	3	–	1
Texas College	3	–	2	–	1	4	–	2	–	1
Bishop	3	–	3	–	0	3	–	4	–	0
Wiley	0	–	5	–	1	1	–	6	–	1
Arkansas AM&N	0	–	5	–	1	1	–	7	–	1
Prairie View's conference title was forfeited after the SWAC ruled at its winter meeting, on December 13, that the Panthers had used an ineligible player, Whiteside.

The 1941 Southern Jaguars football team was an American football team that represented Southern University as a member of the Southwestern Athletic Conference (SWAC) during the 1941 college football season. Led by Ace Mumford in his sixth season as head coach, the Jaguars compiled an overall record of 5–3–1, with a mark of 4–2 in conference play, and finished third in the SWAC.

The team played its home games at University Stadium in Scotlandville, Louisiana (which has since been annexed into the Baton Rouge city limits).

== Schedule ==
Date	Opponent	Site	Result	Attendance	Source
September 27	Leland*	University Stadium; Scotlandville, LA	W 36–6	1,100	
October 4	at Bishop	Marshall, TX	W 14–0	2,000	
October 11	Langston	University Stadium; Scotlandville, LA	L 14–19	2,500	
October 27	vs. Wiley	State Fair Stadium; Shreveport, LA	W 22–7	5,000	
November 8	Texas College	University Stadium; Scotlandville, LA	W 14–7		
November 15	Florida A&M*	University Stadium; Scotlandville, LA	L 7–10	5,000	
November 22	at Arkansas AM&N	State College Field; Pine Bluff, AR	W 14–7	500	
November 29	Prairie View	University Stadium; Scotlandville, LA	L 7–19		
December 5	vs. Xavier (LA)*	Baton Rouge H.S. Stadium; Baton Rouge, LA	T 6–6	5,000	
*Non-conference game
