= 1924 Tuskegee Golden Tigers football team =

American college football season

1924 Tuskegee Golden Tigers football

Black college national co-champion SIAC champion
- Conference: Southern Intercollegiate Athletic Conference
- Record: 9–0–1 (5–0 SIAC)
- Head coach: Cleve Abbott (2nd season)
- Home stadium: Washington Field

The 1924 Tuskegee Golden Tigers football team was an American football team that represented the Tuskegee Normal and Industrial Institute (now known as Tuskegee University) as a member of the Southern Intercollegiate Athletic Conference (SIAC) during the 1924 college football season. In their second season under head coach Cleve Abbott, the Golden Tigers compiled a 9–0–1 record, won the SIAC championship, shut out six of ten opponents, and outscored all opponents by a total of 301 to 25. The team was recognized as the black college national champion.

== Schedule ==
Date	Time	Opponent	Site	Result	Attendance	Source
October 4		24th Infantry, Fort Benning*	Washington Field; Tuskegee, AL	W 21–0		
October 11		Fort Valley High and Industrial School*	Washington Field; Tuskegee, AL	W 47–0		
October 18		South Carolina State*	Washington Field; Tuskegee, AL	W 53–6		
October 25		Morehouse	Washington Field; Tuskegee, AL	W 10–0	4,000	
November 1		at Fisk	Sulphur Dell; Nashville, TN	W 67–6		
November 8		at Atlanta	Atlanta, GA	W 17–0	3,000–6,000	
November 14	2:30 p.m.	at Alabama State	Cramton Bowl; Montgomery, AL (rivalry)	W 28–7	4,000	
November 27		Talladega	Washington Field; Tuskegee, AL	W 20–6		
November 29		at New Orleans*	New Orleans, LA	W 38–0		
December 5	2:00 p.m.	at Paul Quinn*	Jackson Field; Waco, TX	T 0–0	1,500	
*Non-conference game; All times are in Central time
