= Charles M. Bishop =

American college president (1862–1949)

5th President of Southwestern University
- In office 1911–1922
- Preceded by: Robert Stewart Hyer
- Succeeded by: Paul Whitfield Horn

Personal details
- Born: Charles McTyeire Bishop; February 2, 1862 Jefferson, North Carolina, U.S.
- Died: November 30, 1949 (aged 87) Houston, Texas, U.S.
- Education: Emory and Henry College; Southwestern University
- Occupation: Methodist minister, university president, and professor
- Known for: Founder of Alpha Chi

Charles McTyeire Bishop (February 2, 1862 – November 30, 1949) was an American academic administrator, college professor, and Methodist minister. He was a president of Southwestern University in Georgetown, Texas. Bishop was also the founder of Alpha Chi collegiate honor society.

== Early life ==
Bishop was born in Jefferson, North Carolina, on February 2, 1862. His parents were Mary (née Shannon) and B. W. S. Bishop, a prominent minister with the Holston Conference of the Methodist Episcopal Church. He had a brother, David, who became a professor at the University of Mississippi.

Bishop attended Emory and Henry College where he was a member of Sigma Alpha Epsilon. He also graduated from Southwestern University. He earned a Doctor of Divinity degree.

== Career ==
=== Clergy ===
Bishop was a Methodist minister. He became the pastor of the Melrose Methodist Church in Kansas City, Missouri, in January 1890. In January 1894, he was pastor of the Lexington Methodist Episcopal Church in Lexington, Missouri. He was pastor of the Brooklyn Avenue Methodist Episcopal Church (South) in Kansas City in 1896. He was the pastor the Francis Street Methodist Church in St. Joseph, Missouri in 1903, where he started a campaign against crime. He became the co-president of St. Joseph's Ministerial Alliance in 1904. In 1909, he was pastor of the First Methodist Church in Columbia, Missouri. In 1910, he moved to Fort Worth, Texas, serving in the North Texas Conference. Bishop was the pastor of St. Paul's Methodist Church in Houston, Texas, from 1921 to 1924.

=== Academia ===
Bishop served on the board of curators of Central College in 1906. In April 1909, Bishop presented the Cole Lectures at Vanderbilt University in Nashville, Tennessee.

Bishop was elected the president of Southwestern University in Georgetown, Texas, on June 9, 1911. His inauguration was December 12, 1911. Bishop left the university's presidency in 1921.

In January 1914, Bishop was an honorary at the dedication of the George R. Smith College in Sedalia, Missouri. At the Southern Sociological Conference for Education and Industry in New Orleans in April 1916, Bishop was the keynote speaker, talking about the causes and negative impacts of lynchings and mob violence against Blacks.

In 1924, he became a professor in the School of Theology at Southern Methodist University. He retired as a professor emeritus in 1934.

Bishop wrote religious books and published articles in educational and theological journals. In 1915, Bishop established the collegiate honor society of Alpha Chi.

== Personal life ==
Bishop was married to Phoebe Eleanor Jones. The couple had four daughters. He was a member of Pi Gamma Nu and Theta Phi.

After retiring in 1934, Bishop lived in Houston, Texas. Bishop died at the age of 87 in Houston on November 30, 1949. He was buried in Georgetown, Texas.
