= 1941 Morris Brown Wolverines football team =

American college football season

1941 Morris Brown Wolverines football

Black college national champion SIAC champion

Peach Blossom Classic, W 7–6 vs. North Carolina College Vulcan Bowl, L 0–13 vs. Langston
- Conference: Southern Intercollegiate Athletic Conference
- Record: 10–1 (7–0 SIAC)
- Head coach: Billy Nicks (10th season)
- Home stadium: Ponce de Leon Park

1941 Southern Intercollegiate Athletic Conference football standings
	Conf.					Overall
Team	W		L		T	W		L		T
Morris Brown $	7	–	0	–	0	10	–	1	–	0
Tuskegee	6	–	1	–	0	8	–	2	–	0
Florida A&M	4	–	1	–	0	8	–	1	–	0
Lane	4	–	1	–	1	6	–	3	–	1
Fisk	1	–	1	–	1	2	–	1	–	3
Benedict	2	–	2	–	1	4	–	4	–	1
Alabama State	3	–	4	–	0	4	–	5	–	0
Morehouse	3	–	4	–	0	3	–	5	–	0
South Carolina State	1	–	2	–	2	4	–	3	–	2
Xavier (LA)	2	–	5	–	0	3	–	7	–	1
Knoxville	1	–	3	–	2	2	–	3	–	2
Talladega	0	–	2	–	0	1	–	5	–	0
LeMoyne	0	–	4	–	1	2	–	5	–	1
Clark (GA)	0	–	4	–	2	0	–	4	–	2
$ – Conference champion

The 1941 Morris Brown Wolverines football team represented Morris Brown College as a member of the Southern Intercollegiate Athletic Conference (SIAC) during the 1941 college football season. In their tenth season under head coach Billy Nicks, the Wolverines compiled an overall record of 10–1 record with a mark of 7–0 in conference play, winning the SIAC title for the second consecutive year. Morris Brown defeated North Carolina College in the Peach Blossom Classic and Langston in the Vulcan Bowl. The Wolverines were recognized as a black college national champion. The team played home games at Ponce de Leon Park in Atlanta.

== Schedule ==
Date	Time	Opponent	Site	Result	Attendance	Source
September 27		Allen*	Ponce de Leon Park; Atlanta, GA	W 26–0		
October 4	2:30 p.m.	Tuskegee	Ponce de Leon Park; Atlanta, GA	W 29–6	3,000	
October 11	9:30 p.m.	at Lincoln (MO)*	Public School Stadium; Jefferson City, MO	W 19–12		
October 18	2:30 p.m.	Morehouse^{†}	Ponce de Leon Park; Atlanta, GA	W 21–0		
October 25		at Florida A&M	Sampson-Bragg Field; Tallahassee, FL	W 20–0	5,000	
November 1	3:30 p.m.	at Alabama State	Hornet Stadium; Montgomery, AL	W 26–6		
November 8		at Xavier (LA)	Xavier Stadium; New Orleans, LA	W 6–0	3,000	
November 15		at LeMoyne	Washington Stadium; Memphis, TN	W 13–6		
November 27	2:00 p.m.	Clark	Ponce de Leon Park; Atlanta, GA	W 32–0		
December 6	2:30 p.m.	vs. North Carolina College*	Memorial Stadium; Columbus, GA (Peach Blossom Classic)	W 7–6	6,000	
January 1, 1942		vs. Langston*	Rickwood Field; Birmingham, AL (Vulcan Bowl)	L 0–13	6,000	
*Non-conference game; ^{†}Homecoming; All times are in Eastern time
