= 1928 Tennessee State Tigers football team =

American college football season

1928 Tennessee State Tigers football
- Conference: Southern Intercollegiate Athletic Conference
- Record: 2–4 (1–4 SIAC)
- Head coach: Harry Long (1st season)
- Captain: Red Gaston
- Home stadium: State Field, Athletic Park

1928 Southern Intercollegiate Athletic Conference football standings
	Conf.					Overall
Team	W		L		T	W		L		T
Tuskegee	5	–	1	–	2	6	–	1	–	4
Clark (GA)	5	–	1	–	1	6	–	1	–	1
Atlanta	4	–	1	–	1	5	–	2	–	2
Fisk	4	–	1	–	0	5	–	2	–	2
Knoxville	2	–	1	–	3	3	–	2	–	4
Morris Brown	3	–	2	–	1	4	–	2	–	1
Alabama State	4	–	3	–	1	5	–	4	–	1
Morehouse	2	–	3	–	0	4	–	5	–	1
Tennessee State	1	–	4	–	0	2	–	4	–	0
Talladega	1	–	4	–	1	1	–	5	–	1
Florida A&M	0	–	4	–	0	0	–	4	–	0
Miles	0	–	6	–	0	2	–	7	–	0
No conference champion was recognized.

The 1928 Tennessee State Tigers football team represented Tennessee Agricultural & Industrial State College—now known as Tennessee State University—as a member of the Southern Intercollegiate Athletic Conference (SIAC) during the 1928 college football season. Led by Harry Long in his first and only season as head coach, the Tigers compiled an overall record of 2–4 with a mark of 1–4 conference play, tying for ninth place in the SIAC.

After coaching the football team at Paul Quinn College in Waco, Texas, Long was hired to coached the football team and head the biology department at Tennessee State.

== Schedule ==
Date	Time	Opponent	Site	Result	Attendance	Source
October 20		at Miles	Birmingham, AL	W 18–0		
October 27		at Knoxville	Knoxville, TN	L 0–13		
November 2	1:30 p.m.	at Morris Brown	Morris Brown University flats; Atlanta, GA	L 0–2		
November 10		Alabama State	State Field; Nashville, TN	L 0–6		
November 17		at Simmons (KY)*	Central High School field; Louisville, KY	W 7–2		
November 29		Fisk^{†}	Athletic Park; Nashville, TN	L 0–12	10,000	
*Non-conference game; ^{†}Homecoming; All times are in Central time
