= Alpha Chi =

American collegiate honor society

- ΑΧ
- Founded: February 22, 1922; 103 years ago Southwestern University
- Type: Honor
- Affiliation: ACHS
- Status: Active
- Emphasis: General scholarship
- Scope: National
- Motto: "You shall know the truth and the truth shall make you free."
- Colors: Emerald Green and Sapphire blue
- Publication: Aletheia; Kalo; Alpha Chi Recorder; Alpha Chi Newsletter
- Chapters: 300 active
- Members: 10,000 active 410,000+ lifetime
- Headquarters: 8 Shackleford Plaza, Ste. 319; Little Rock, Arkansas 72211; United States
- Website: www.alphachihonor.org

Alpha Chi National College Honor Society (or ΑΧ) is an American collegiate honor society recognizing achievements in general scholarship. It was formed in 1922 by nineteen schools in Texas; however, the first official meeting to discuss the founding of an intercollegiate honor society, held on February 22, 1922, only saw five schools represented. Since then it has expanded to 300 active chapters in the United States. It is an open society that invites university juniors, seniors, and graduate students who are in the top ten percent of their class.

== History ==
In 1915, Southwestern University President Charles M. Bishop created an honor society to encourage and promote superior students. Faculty at Southwestern reached out to four other colleges and universities in Texas to create an intercollegiate honor society. On February 22, 1922, the Scholarship Societies of Texas were formed. A year later, representatives from 13 schools met on the campus of the University of Texas at Austin and six other schools mailed in votes to establish the organization's first constitution.

These nineteen schools went on to establish their chapters of the organization including the Nolle Scholarship Society at Southwest Texas State Normal College, now known as Texas State University–San Marcos. Between 1926 and 1927 the honor society expanded to schools in Arkansas and Louisiana resulting in the name changing to the Scholarship Societies of the South. Dean Alfred H. Nolle, after whom Southwest Texas' chapter was named, became president of the newly named organization; Nolle would later serve as the secretary-treasurer for nearly fifty years.

With plans for further expansion, in 1934 the organization voted to change its name again, this time to Alpha Chi. The name was chosen such that its initials ΑΧ would come from the Greek words aletheia for truth and χαρακτήρ for the character. Its purpose is "to encourage sound scholarship and devotion to truth. In 1955, Alpha Chi became a member of the Association of College Honor Societies.

At the 2007 National Convention, a membership category for graduate students was created allowing them, as well as college juniors and seniors, to join the society. In 2012, it had 337 active chapters, 12,577 active members, and had initiated 409,402 members.

Its headquarters is in Little Rock, Arkansas.

== Symbols ==
The name Alpha Chi was chosen such that its initials ΑΧ would come from the Greek words ἀλήθεια (aletheia) for truth and χαρακτήρ for the character. Its motto is "You shall know the truth and the truth shall make you free." The society's colors are emerald green and sapphire blue; this are also the colors of its honor cords. Its publications are Alpha Chi Recorder and Alpha Chi Newsletter.

== Membership ==
The Alpha Chi Honor Society is open to college juniors, seniors, and graduate students in the top ten percent of their class. Invitations to join the organization are issued directly to eligible students by faculty advisors of active Alpha Chi chapters. The society inducts about 11,000 new members each year through its 300 currently active chapters. Membership is for life.

== Activities ==
=== Publications ===
Alpha Chi publishes two magazines: Aletheia and Kalo. Aletheia serves as the society's peer-reviewed academic journal for undergraduate student members, featuring papers and essays from a wide variety of academic disciplines.

=== Scholarships ===
The national headquarters for Alpha Chi sponsors 43 annual scholarships and fellowships for members on a competitive basis. Undergraduate students can receive the Edwin Gaston Scholarship and Alfred H. Nolle Scholarship to help fund their senior year of college. The Benedict Fellowship and Josephe E. Pryor Fellowship are for graduate study for graduate members and alumni. Alpha Chi's regions offer scholarships, and individual collegiate chapters may also offer their scholarships.

=== Awards ===
Alpha Chi presents its Outstanding Chapter Award and its Distinguished Alumnus Award at its national convention, held every other year.

== Chapters ==
In 2021, the society had 300 active chapters.

== Notable members ==
- Charles T. McDowell, director of the Center for Post-Soviet and Eastern European Studies at the University of Texas at Arlington
