= Paul Quinn College =

Historically black Methodist college in Dallas, Texas

- Former names: Connectional High School and Institute (1872–1877); Waco College (1877–1881)
- Motto: WE Over Me
- Type: Private historically black college
- Established: 1872
- Affiliations: Transnational Association of Christian Colleges and Schools
- Religious affiliation: African Methodist Episcopal Church
- Endowment: $4.98M (2021)
- President: Michael J. Sorrell
- Students: 551
- Location: Dallas, Texas, United States; 32.677097°N 96.754935°W
- Campus: 146 acres (59 ha)
- Colors: Purple, Black & Gold
- Nickname: Tigers
- Sporting affiliations: NAIA – RRAC
- Website: paulquinn.edu

Paul Quinn College (PQC) is a private historically black Methodist college in Dallas, Texas. The college is affiliated with the African Methodist Episcopal Church (AME). It is the oldest historically black college west of the Mississippi River and the nation's first urban work college.

Paul Quinn is home to the WE over ME Farm, which was created through a partnership with PepsiCo to bring healthy food to the food desert of Dallas.

== History ==
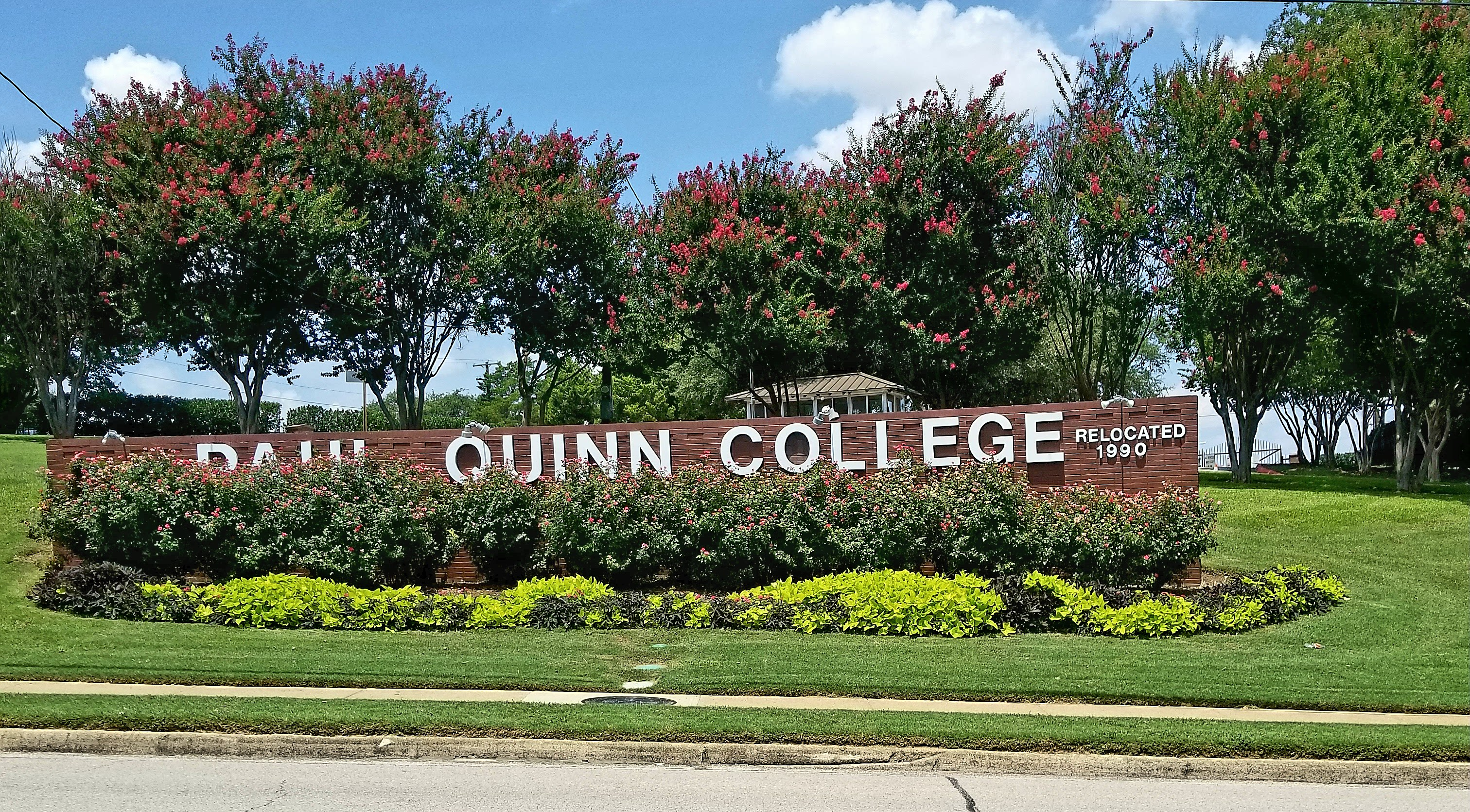
PQC entrance sign

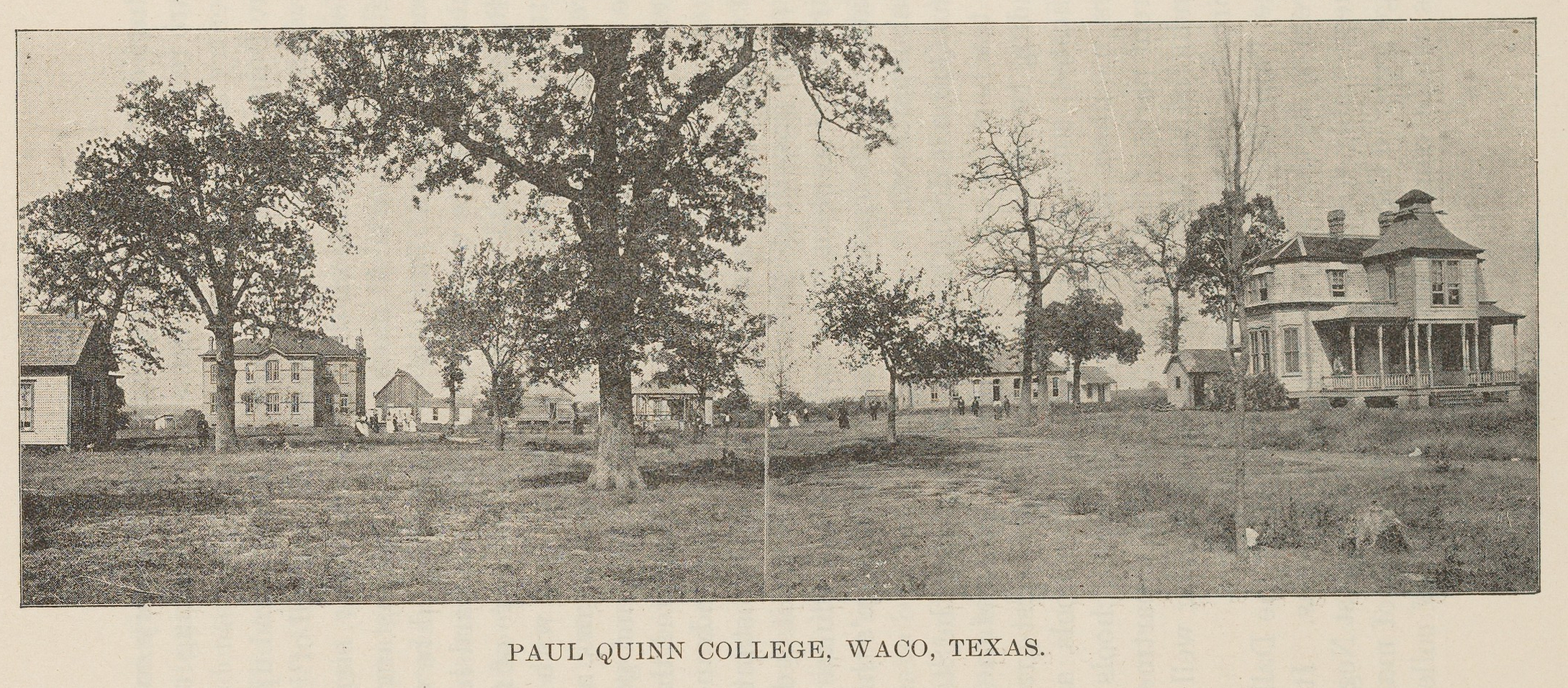
Paul Quinn College as it appeared in an 1898 publication of the A.M.E. Church journal The Educator.

The college was founded by a small group of African Methodist Episcopal (AME) Church preachers in Austin, Texas, on April 4, 1872, as the Connectional School for the Education of Negro Youth. Originally, its classes were held in churches and people's homes, but in 1877 the school moved into its own building in Waco, Texas.

The college was renamed Waco College. Classes were held in a modest one-building trade school; freedmen were taught the skills of blacksmithing, carpentry, tanning, and saddle work, common occupations for the era, especially in the increasingly segregated state. This was the model established by the Tuskegee Institute.

Presidents of Paul Quinn College
1872 – 1876	Bishop John M. Brown
1876 – 1880	Bishop Richard Harvey Cain
1880 – 1883	H.T. Kealing
1883 – 1891	I.M. Burgan
1891 – 1892	N.A. Banks
1904 – 1908	W.I. Laws
1908 – 1911	D.A. Butler
1911 – 1914	I.M. Burgan
1914 – 1924	J.K. Williams
1924 – 1926	J.F. Williams
1926 – 1928	N.A. Banks
1928 – 1932	Dean Mohr
1932 – 1939	A.S. Jackson
1939 – 1942	J.W. Yancy II
1942 – 1943	George Davis
1943 – 1946	George Singleton
1946 – 1951	Nanie Bell Aycock
1951 – 1953	Sherman L. Green, Jr.
1953 – 1956	Frank R. Veal
1956 – 1962	John H. Adams
1962 – 1969	L.H. McCloney
1969 – 1976	Stanley E. Rutland
1976 – 1978	Reuben D. Manning
1979 – 1981	William D. Watley
1981 – 1982	L.H. McCloney
1982 – 1984	Norman W. Handy
1984 – 1992	Warren W. Morgan
1992 – 1992	Winston D. Powers
1992 – 2001	Lee E. Monroe
2002 – 2005	Dwight J. Fennell
2006 – 2007	John Waddell
2007 – Present	Michael J. Sorrell

Later, under the direction of Bishop William Paul Quinn (1788–1873), A.M.E. districts were developed throughout the South and tasked with raising funds to improve the college. During this period, more than twenty acres of additional land was purchased and the curriculum was expanded to include the classical subjects of Latin, mathematics, music, theology, English, plus vocational skills in carpentry, sewing, and household, kitchen, and dining room work. In May 1881, the college was chartered by the State of Texas and changed its name to Paul Quinn College to commemorate the contributions of Bishop William Paul Quinn. In 1898 the school had seven faculty, including four women.

=== Expansion ===
The campus was expanded, with new buildings constructed with capital raised from interested patrons. In 1950, the college began significant physical expansion. A campus church, student union building, gymnasium and administration building were erected between 1950 and 1954. Two new dormitories, a modern two-story classroom building, a fully equipped science department, and a new library were added to the campus.

In spring of 1954, the Waco Chamber of Commerce successfully completed a campaign which raised $100,000 for a new women's dormitory to replace one destroyed by a fire. Bishop O.L. Sherman was assigned to supervise the work of the A.M.E. Church in Texas in 1962. His first official act was to have the Charter of the college changed so that trustees could be elected without regard to race, creed, or color. Because of this significant innovation, new leaders from Central Texas were added to the board of trustees.

Dr. Stanley E. Rutland became President of the college in 1969. Under his leadership, the physical plant of the college continued to improve. Among the changes were the addition of a new gymnasium, the renovation of historic Johnson Hall, and the development of the Ethnic Cultural Center. Under Dr. Rutland, the college received accreditation in 1972 with the Southern Association of Colleges and Schools (SACS) for the first time.

=== Move to Dallas ===
The college relocated from Waco to southeast Dallas in 1990. It acquired the former campus of Bishop College from African-American businessman Comer Cottrell. During the first semester in its new home, the college boasted an enrollment of 1,020 students and became the only HBCU in the Dallas-Fort Worth area.

In 2006, Board of Trustees member Peggy Sterling and her employer, American Airlines, secured the services of global management-consulting firm the Boston Consulting Group (BCG) to analyze the operations and performance of the college. BCG's work ultimately provided the Institution with a blueprint that eventually became the college's Strategic Plan from 2007 to 2012.

=== New direction ===
In September 2007, Michael Sorrell, a former member of the Board of Trustees, was selected as president, after having served as the interim president since March of that year.

Since his arrival, the college has raised academic standards and embarked on an ambitious revitalization of the campus, which has included spending over $4 million in capital improvements. It has reduced institutional debt by 40 percent and resolved all previous issues with the audit findings.

Sorrell instituted a "business casual" dress code on campus in order to prepare students for work life after college. His next set of plans for the college call for an increased commitment to recruitment and retention.

In 2009, the college's accreditation was challenged by SACS, based on problems with institutional effectiveness and financial stability. Following a lawsuit, a judge issued an injunction which reinstated accreditation prior to hearing of the lawsuit.

Since that time, Sorrell has continued improvements: the college produced over $2 million in budget surpluses in fiscal 2009, 2010, and 2011; achieved unqualified audits for 2009 and 2010; invested more than $4 million in infrastructure improvements without adding any debt; and formed a groundbreaking partnership with PepsiCo to convert an unused football stadium into a fully operational urban farm.

In 2011, the college received membership into the Transnational Association of Christian Colleges and Schools (TRACS) accrediting agency.

Paul Quinn's Hispanic student population has grown steadily in recent years, making up at least 12% of the student body.

As of 2016, Paul Quinn is one of only eight work colleges in the nation and the first to be in an urban environment.

In 2016, Paul Quinn implemented the African-American Leadership Institute. President Sorrell stated the institute is Paul Quinn's attempt to address economic development, educational, public policy, and leadership development in the North Texas African-American community.

In 2018, Paul Quinn broke ground on the first new campus building in over 40 years. The Trammel S. Crow Living and Learning Center will include a 30,000-square-foot (2,800 m^{2}) dormitory and gym to hold up to 1,500 people. Construction of the new building is expected to be completed in 2019.

Also in 2018, Paul Quinn opened a work program expansion site in Plano, Texas.

In 2021, it was announced Paul Quinn would house an International Baccalaureate school on its campus for students in grades sixth through 12.

== Campus life ==
=== The WE over Me Farm at Paul Quinn College ===
The WE over Me Farm at Paul Quinn College, formerly called the Food for Good Farm at Paul Quinn College, began as an answer to the food desert conditions in the Southern sector of Dallas. In 2008, college president Michael Sorrell, who had shuttered the school's football program shortly after taking office in 2007, talked with a real estate investor about devoting a tract of land to community farming. Although the idea of using the former football field was initially a joke by Sorrell, it soon became reality.

The reconstruction of the football field into a 100-yard farm that produces spinach, herbs, watermelon, potatoes, sweet potatoes, arugula, and other produce has produced partnerships with Yale University and other institutions for the continued study of the impact of urban farming. The dedication of the farm was on May 10, 2010. The farm gives 20 percent of the gross yield to the community. Even before the farm was officially dedicated, it had picked up a major customer in Legends Hospitality, a venue management firm partially owned by the Dallas Cowboys that provides food services for the Cowboys' AT&T Stadium. Yahoo! Sports reported in 2013 that the farm will produce about 17,500 pounds of food for AT&T Stadium in the 2013 football season.

In April 2011, the farm hosted its first major fundraising event. "A Community Cooks" featured 13 top local chefs cooking various dishes for the community. Will Allen, the keynote speaker, is a MacArthur Fellow and one of the foremost thinkers on urban farming. "A Community Cooks" is an annual event.

=== Cafeteria ===
Citing health concerns, in August 2012, Paul Quinn banned pork and pork products from being sold at the cafeteria. More turkey, salads and other healthy food options have been included.

=== We Are Not Trash ===
The college ended 2011 locked in a battle with the city of Dallas over the McCommas Bluff Landfill, which is approximately 1.5 miles east of the campus. The city's decision to re-route all of Dallas' waste to the landfill, effectively transforming it into one of the largest landfills in the southwest, infuriated the student population. This anger was exacerbated by the fact the school is located in the middle of an area the United States Department of Agriculture has labeled a food desert.

In June 2011, the students organized a town hall meeting and invited city officials to explain the efficacy of expanding the landfill. More than 250 residents attended. This was the largest town hall meeting in this city council district in more than 20 years. The town hall meeting eventually turned into "I AM NOT TRASH", two student-led demonstrations at the Dallas City Hall. Despite the students efforts, the city council voted 8–7 to move forward with the plans to dump all the city's waste into the landfill without any prior study as to the effect of such a decision.

In response, the Quinnite Nation mobilized into WE ARE NOT TRASH, a student-led, community-oriented effort to advocate for thoughtful, citizen-oriented policy-making from their elected leaders. On Saturday, November 5, 2011, approximately 500 people marched alongside a group of civic leaders from south Dallas across one of the Trinity River bridges into Downtown Dallas.

=== Trayvon Martin verdict ===
On March 23, 2012, hundreds of community members joined Paul Quinn students to protest the shooting of 17-year-old Trayvon Martin in Sanford, Florida, by George Zimmerman on February 26 of the same year.

August 6, 2013, vice-president of content with HBCU Buzz, Robert K. Hoggard wrote, "Incensed by the legal protections that led to Zimmerman’s acquittal for the killing of Trayvon Martin, Paul Quinn College, a historically black college in Southern Dallas, is offering the new $7,500 Scholarship for Social Justice to a student who shows potential to bring about change in the community and in the justice system."

=== Student organizations ===
Student organizations on campus include the Student Government Association, class organizations, the Vocal Ensemble, and the PQC Spirit Team. Furthermore, students can be initiated into honor societies, such as Phi Delta Kappa and Alpha Chi honor society, as well as National Pan-Hellenic Council fraternities and sororities. PQC also offers Multicultural Greek Council organizations.

=== Dress code ===
Since the 2007 academic year, the college uses a "business casual" dress code. This encourages students to develop professional attitudes and behaviors in preparation for future success. Students are not allowed to wear saggy pants, jeans, flip flops, slippers, pajama bottoms, nor shorts, sweatsuits, or shirts without collars outside their dormitories on weekdays from 7 am - 5:30 pm, unless involved in exercise. A college closet was established to help provide professional business clothing for students in need.

== Athletics ==
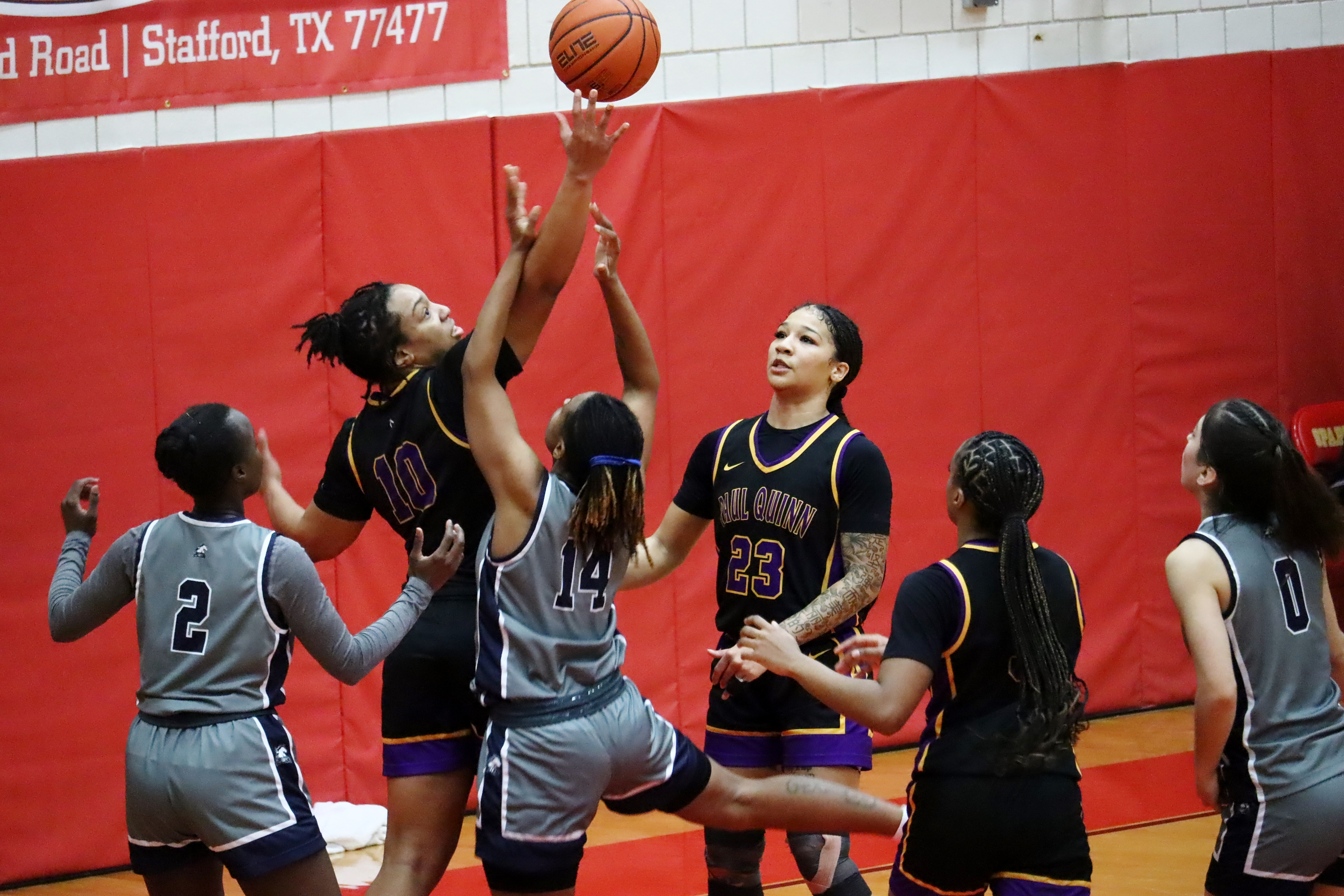
A women's basketball game between Paul Quinn and North American University in 2024

The Paul Quinn athletic teams are called the Tigers. The college is a member of the National Association of Intercollegiate Athletics (NAIA), primarily competing in the Red River Athletic Conference (RRAC) since the 1998–99 academic year. They are also a member of the United States Collegiate Athletic Association (USCAA) as an Independent. The Tigers previously competed as a founding member of the Southwestern Athletic Conference (SWAC) from 1920–21 to 1928–29, which is currently an NCAA Division I FCS athletic conference.

Paul Quinn competes in nine intercollegiate varsity sports: Men's sports include basketball, cross country, soccer and track & field; while women's sports include basketball, cross country, soccer, track & field and volleyball.

=== Accomplishments ===
Paul Quinn teams have won 18 conference championships since 1983.

The men's basketball team has won three national championships in the United States Collegiate Athletic Association, including two under coach James Summers. The first in 1990 featured Roland E. Williams, an NAIA All-American from Tampa. The Tigers and coach Summers won their second title in 1995 and their third in 2022.

The men's track and field team won two Red River Athletic Conference championships, in 2006 and 2007.

The 1924 Paul Quinn Tigers football team coached by Harry Long was the black college football national champion. The Tigers won the SWAC in 1922 and 1924.

Paul Quinn's football and marching band programs ended in 2007 due to budget cuts.

== Campus ==
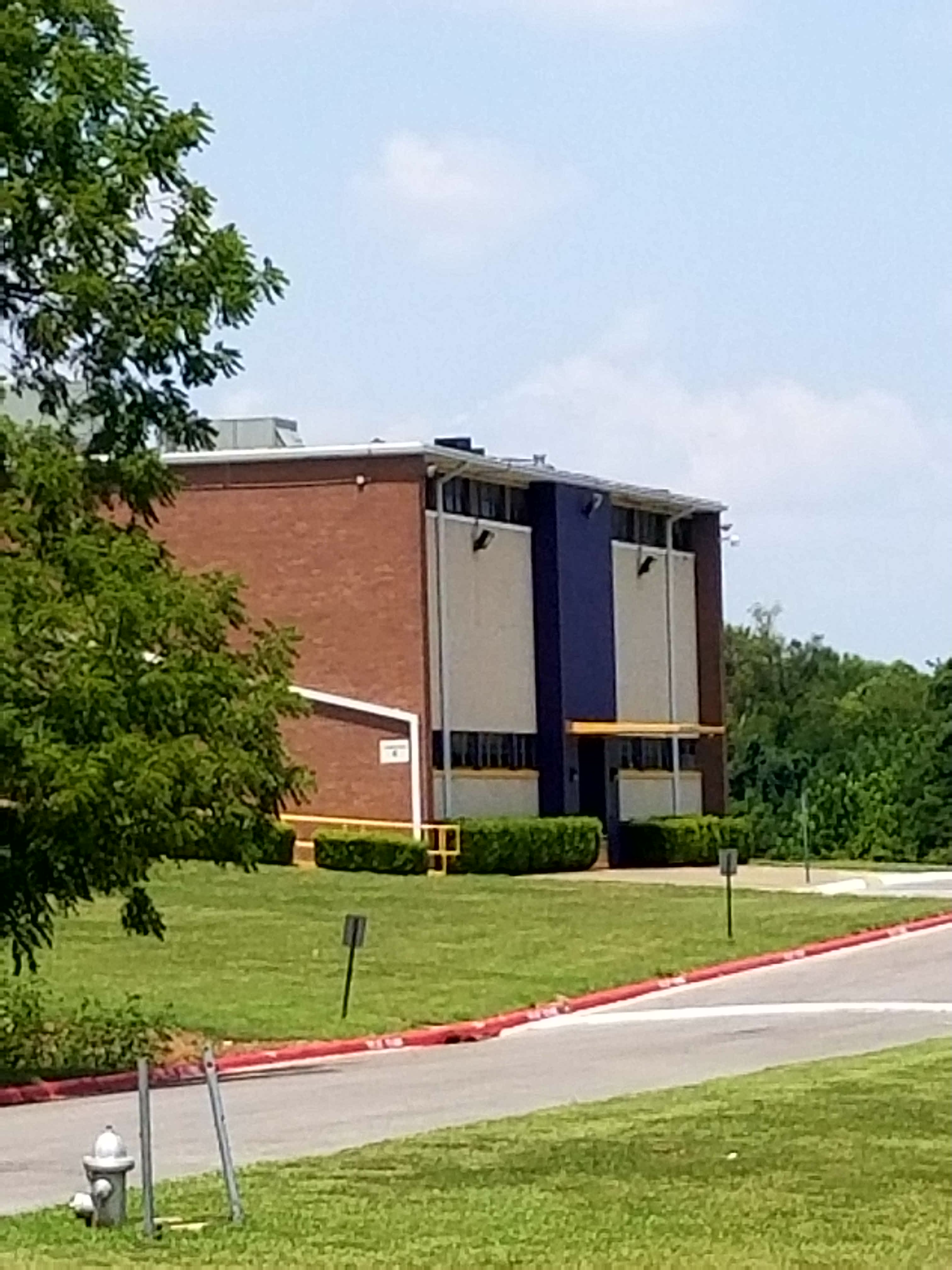
A building on campus

The John Hurst Adams Administrative Building, formerly Price-Branch Classroom Building, contains the presidential suite administrative offices and classrooms. In the fall of 2011, two fully interactive technology classrooms were built on the second level of the building. These classrooms have state of the art video conferencing capability.

The Isabel and Comer Cottrell Student Union Building, also known as the SUB, was completed in 1970. The SUB includes the cafe, the Tiger's Den, the student lounge, and the student workout facility. In the fall of 2012, the institution will convert the student workout facility into the Quinnite Retention Center, a 24-hour study facility that will aide in the college's efforts to improve retention rates. The space that was formerly the campus bookstore will now be a state of the art gym facility that students, staff, and faculty can use. The Grand Lounge is the campus' primary meeting space. It is also where the weekly Chapel services are held.

The Richard Allen Chapel, formerly Carr P. Collins Chapel, completed in 1970, is currently under renovation. The lawn of the chapel is the venue for the annual commencement exercises. Completed in 1970, it serves as the religious education building.

The gymnasium was completed in 1961. In spring 2011, the gymnasium was outfitted with a new HVAC system.

Zale Library was completed in 1963. The library contains a 9x23 foot mural that was painted by artist Louis Freund in 1968. The mural depicts the progression and struggles of African-Americans in the pursuit of an education. In spring 2011, more than 900 volumes of legal publications were donated by Hunton & Williams, LLP to start the Paul Quinn College Law Library.

The school has one residence hall, the Lucy Hughes Hall, formerly Pearl C. Anderson hall. the dormitory for females opened in 1969 as a facility of Bishop College. It currently serves men and women. The other dormitory buildings were demolished in a 15-building demolition that began in 2010. The campus is gated.

The campus is 91 miles (146 km) from Waco, 190 miles (310 km) from Austin, 230 miles (370 km) from Houston, and 520 miles (840 km) from New Orleans.

== Notable alumni ==
- Dick Campbell - theater producer and director in New York who helped launch the career of Ossie Davis
- Andy Cooper - Negro leagues pitcher inducted into Baseball Hall of Fame in 2006
- Mims Hackett - member of the New Jersey General Assembly (2002–2007)
- Toni Rose - member of the Texas House of Representatives
- Korey Williams - Canadian Football League player - Graduate of Northwestern Oklahoma State

== Notable faculty ==
- L. Clifford Davis, civil rights attorney, judge
- Monroe Alpheus Majors, lecturer from 1900 to 1905

== In popular culture ==
Paul Quinn College was featured in the 2007 movie The Great Debaters starring Denzel Washington.

== See also ==
- African Americans in Dallas-Fort Worth
