= Ace Mumford =

American football coach

Biographical details
- Born: November 26, 1898; Buckhannon, West Virginia, U.S.
- Died: April 28, 1962 (aged 63); Scotlandville, Louisiana, U.S. (now part of Baton Rouge, Louisiana)

Coaching career (HC unless noted)
- 1924–1926: Jarvis Christian
- 1927–1929: Bishop
- 1931–1935: Texas College
- 1936–1961: Southern

Head coaching record
- Overall: 233–85–23
- Bowls: 4–1

Accomplishments and honors

Championships
- Football; 6 black college national (1935, 1948–1950, 1954, 1960); 12 SWAC (1934–1935, 1938, 1940, 1946–1950, 1955, 1959–1960) Basketball; 1 black college national (1941)
- College Football Hall of Fame; Inducted in 2001 (profile)

Arnett William "Ace" Mumford (November 26, 1898 – April 28, 1962) was an American football coach. He served as the head football coach at historically black colleges and universities in Texas and Louisiana from 1924 to 1961, compiling a career college football record of 233–85–23. His head coaching positions were at Jarvis Christian College (1924–1926), Bishop College (1927–1929), Texas College (1931–1935), and Southern University (1936–1961). He has been inducted into at least eight halls of fame for his coaching accomplishments.

== Background ==
In 1924 Mumford graduated from Wilberforce University, where he served as a member of Kappa Alpha Psi social fraternity. He began coaching later that same year.

After a brief stint at Jarvis Christian, he then coached football, basketball, and baseball at Bishop. He first came to the attention of Southern University officials after one of his Texas College teams soundly defeated Southern in a game; afterward, when a Southern dean accused his Texas College players of stealing from the school, Mumford forced all of his players to get off of the team bus and to display their personal belongings until the school's missing items could be located. Southern officials were impressed by both his coaching and disciplinary actions of that day. Once at Southern he was also known for emphasizing the importance of education. On the field itself he earned a reputation for perfectionism, making the team practice the same play late into the night to get it just right, even employing a white-colored football to assist visibility during late night use. He was also notably opposed to attempting field goals; at one point Southern was documented to have made just three successful kicks in the decade prior to a November 1955 game—and perhaps even extending for an undocumented period of time after that as well. A contemporary newspaper article concerning a banquet to be held to recognize Mumford for his then-twenty years of service to Southern summed up his career:

Mumford's success can be contributed (sic) to his ability as an organizer. Under his direction, the Jaguars have developed a well-balanced running and passing attack from the intricate T-formation. In this system, team play is based on quickness and maneuverability rather than brawn and power. Mumford places heavy stress on physical condition, demanding above all, that his athletes hustle at all times.

In those days, long before the formal creation of the Bayou Classic, Mumford led Southern to an 8–1 record against Grambling State (including 5–1 against the famed Eddie Robinson). Southern's biggest intrastate rivalry of that era was actually with Xavier, and it quickly grew too heated to remain at on-campus venues. Mumford supported philanthropic efforts to move the game to a neutral field and convert it into a charitable fundraiser for the local chapter of the Lions Club, in its fight against the causes of visual impairment. Multiple "Glasses Bowl" classic games were held, starting in 1939.

Mumford died of a heart attack at the age of 63, while directing a track meet. It is said that "he died in his cleats."

== Legacy ==
Mumford once had the third most wins among all college football coaches, behind only Pop Warner and Amos Alonzo Stagg; he still has the fourth most wins among HBCU coaches, behind Robinson, Billy Joe, and John Merritt.

Mumford led Texas College to 1 black college football national championship and Southern to 5 black national championships. He also coached Texas College to 2 and Southern to 11 Southwestern Athletic Conference football championships. During one particular stretch between 1948 and 1951, his teams posted a 38-game unbeaten streak. In addition, he coached Southern to the 1941 black national championship in basketball by taking the National Intercollegiate Invitational Tournament in Cincinnati. He also served as athletic director while at Southern.

Mumford's teams produced more than 40 All-Americans. In 1960 it was also estimated that "more than half of Louisiana's high school coaches are former Jaguars."

By the 1939 season Mumford's football program was so successful that it had begun turning heads even within the local white community; as a sign of the changing times, Southern had begun to advertise accommodations for white patrons on its new stadium grounds. When the stadium was completed in 1940, it included a 150-seat section for white patrons. One of the more noteworthy white fans was Ellis A. "Little Fuzzy" Brown who, along with his twin brother James ("Big Fuzzy"), coached Istrouma High School into the most successful dynasty in Louisiana's highest classification of prep football. Likewise, white coaches such as Frank Broyles and Bear Bryant were known to have visited Mumford during his coaching career to discuss football strategy. Mumford's 1948 team also further bridged the racial gap by participating in the first game between an HBCU and a predominantly white institution, at the Fruit Bowl; Southern defeated San Francisco State 30–0, and finished the year at 12–0—a single-season won–loss record that has yet to be surpassed by any HBCU team.

As evidence of the respect that he retained within the HBCU coaching community, among the pallbearers and honorary pallbearers serving at his funeral were past, present, and future college football head coaches Alex Durley, T. B. Ellis, Jake Gaither, Zip Gayles, Howard Gentry, B. T. Harvey, Emory Hines, Bob Lee, Pop Long, Merritt, Billy Nicks, Alfred Priestly, Robinson, and E. E. Simmons. The funeral was officiated by Rev. Dr. T. J. Jemison.

Among the honors bestowed upon Mumford include him being elected president of the SWAC and executive vice president of the National Association of Intercollegiate Athletics. In 1958 he was inducted into the NAIA–Helms Foundation Hall of Fame. In 1960 he was named "Coach of the Decade" for the 1950s by the 100% Wrong Club of Atlanta, an organization that fosters HBCU athletic competition. In 1961 he was given the Small College Service Award "for outstanding contributions to intercollegiate athletics" by the Football Writers Association of America. On February 25, 1962, shortly before his sudden death, Mumford was recognized by the Baton Rouge Alumni Chapter of Kappa Alpha Psi "for outstanding achievement and social service." Though he was much more closely associated with the NAIA, the National Collegiate Athletic Association even made a special point to issue a memorial resolution for Mumford at its fifty-seventh annual convention, in 1963. Southern's A. W. Mumford Stadium, which saw its original concrete grandstand constructed during his tenure, was renamed for him on September 25, 1982, following an expansion project. Mumford was subsequently posthumously inducted into the Louisiana Sports Hall of Fame (1984), the Southern University Sports Hall of Fame (1988), the SWAC Hall of Fame (1992), the HBCU Heritage Museum and Hall of Fame (before or in 2000), and the College Football Hall of Fame (2001). The American Football Coaches Association, of which he was a member, also selected him posthumously for the 2006 Trailblazer Award, for his coaching accomplishments at an HBCU in the decade of the 1940s (an especially noteworthy achievement considering that, back in 1960, he had been named "Coach of the Decade" for another decade—the 1950s). In 2011 he was inducted into the West Virginia Sports Hall of Fame. In October 2016 the city of Buckhannon, West Virginia erected a plaque at the lot where his childhood home had been located. On November 4, 2016 Mumford was again acknowledged by the Southern University Sports Hall of Fame, this time with a new, life-sized statue bearing his likeness. Most recently he was inducted into the Black College Football Hall of Fame, in 2019.

== Head coaching record ==
Year	Team	Overall	Conference	Standing	Bowl/playoffs
Jarvis Christian (Independent) (1924–1926)
1924	Jarvis Christian	2–2–1			
1925	Jarvis Christian	2–3–1			
1926	Jarvis Christian	2–3–1			
Jarvis Christian:		6–8–3			
Bishop Tigers (Southwestern Athletic Conference) (1927–1929)
1927	Bishop	7–2–1			
1928	Bishop	7–3			
1929	Bishop	8–2			
Bishop:		22–7–1			
Texas College Steers (Southwestern Athletic Conference) (1931–1935)
1931	Texas College		0–3–1	T–4th	
1932	Texas College		1–2–2	4th	
1933	Texas College		1–3–1	T–4th	
1934	Texas College	9–0–1	4–0–1	1st	
1935	Texas College	9–0–1	5–0–1	1st	W Chocolate Bowl
Texas College:		26–9–6	11–8–6		
Southern Jaguars (Southwestern Athletic Conference) (1936–1961)
1936	Southern	3–5–1	1–5	7th	
1937	Southern	4–4–1	1–4–1	6th	
1938	Southern	7–1–1	4–1–1	T–1st	
1939	Southern	4–5–1	1–4–1	6th	
1940	Southern	8–1	5–1	T–1st	
1941	Southern	5–3–1	4–2	3rd	
1942	Southern	4–4–1	0–3–1	5th	L Flower Bowl
1943	No team—World War II				
1944	Southern	4–3	2–4	T–4th	
1945	Southern	6–3–1	5–1	2nd	
1946	Southern	9–2–1	5–1	1st	W Yam Bowl
1947	Southern	10–2	7–0	1st	W Yam Bowl
1948	Southern	12–0	7–0	1st	W Fruit Bowl
1949	Southern	10–0–1	6–0–1	T–1st	
1950	Southern	10–0–1	7–0	1st	
1951	Southern	5–4–2	4–1–2	T–2nd	
1952	Southern	9–2	5–1	2nd	
1953	Southern	9–2	5–1	2nd	
1954	Southern	10–1	5–1	2nd	
1955	Southern	7–2–1	6–1	1st	
1956	Southern	5–5	4–2	T–3rd	
1957	Southern	6–4	4–2	T–2nd	
1958	Southern	8–2	3–2	2nd	
1959	Southern	8–2	7–0	1st	
1960	Southern	9–1	6–1	T–1st	
1961	Southern	7–3	5–2	T–2nd	
Southern:		179–61–13	109–40–7		
Total:		233–85–23			
National championship Conference title Conference division title or championship game berth

== See also ==
- List of college football career coaching wins leaders
