= LeRoy T. Walker =

American track and field coach, sports executive (1918–2012)

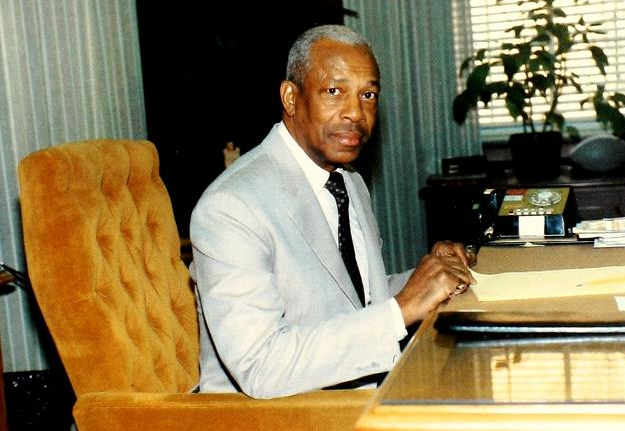
- LeRoy Walker as Chancellor of North Carolina Central University, 1984
- Born: June 14, 1918; Atlanta, Georgia, U.S.
- Died: April 23, 2012 (aged 93); Durham, North Carolina, U.S.
- Education: Benedict College; Columbia; NYU
- Title: President of United States Olympic Committee
- Term: 1992–1996
- Children: 2
- Awards: USATF Hall of Fame; USTFCCCA Hall of Fame; NACDA James J. Corbett Memorial Award; George Dales Award

LeRoy Tashreau Walker Sr. (June 14, 1918 – April 23, 2012) was an American track and field coach and the first African-American president of the United States Olympic Committee. In the 1996 Olympics, Walker was delegated to lead a 10,000 member group of the most talented athletes in the world.

In 1988 he was elected to the position of Treasurer, one of the four officer positions on the Board of Directors (President, Vice President, Secretary and Treasurer) for a four year term. Largely on the strength of his performance as Treasurer, he was elected to the position of President for a four year term. He gave up his six figure salary position as the director of sports for the Atlanta Committee for the Olympic Games to take the unpaid presidency position.

== Education and career ==
Walker received degrees from Benedict College (B.A.) and Columbia University (M.A.). Walker competed on the football and basketball teams at Benedict, and he also was a national-class sprinter for the track and field team despite Benedict not having a track facility to train on. He received his Ph.D. in biomechanics at New York University. He went back to Benedict College to begin a track and field collegiate coaching career. He received enough sports scholarships to finance his college expenses.

In 1944, Walker served as head football coach at Prairie View State Normal & Industrial College and led the team to a record of 3–6 during his only season with the Panthers. In 1945, he became the head coach for the North Carolina Central University track team. He also chaired the physical education and recreation departments. NCCU track and field athletes were all in the Olympic Games between the years 1956 and 1980. When Walker retired in 1986 as North Carolina's chancellor-emeritus, his team won 11 gold medals, 80 were named All-American, and 35 had national championships. In addition to coaching NCCU, he coached track teams from other countries. Israel and Ethiopia in 1960, Trinidad and Tobago in 1964, Jamaica in 1968, and Kenya in 1972. The last team he led to the Olympic Games was for the United States in 1976. The team included Caitlyn Jenner (then Bruce) (Note: Jenner changed her name due to gender transition in 2015.) and Edwin Moses.

He served as the honorary chair of the Board of Directors of the Africa News Service, based in Durham North Carolina.

== Personal life ==
He had a daughter, Dr. Carolyn Walker Hopp, and a son, LeRoy T. Walker, Jr. His home was in Durham, North Carolina. Katherine, his wife, died in 1978.

Walker was a member of Omega Psi Phi fraternity.

== Awards ==
In 1991 Walker was awarded the Eagle Award from the United States Sports Academy. The Eagle Award is the Academy's highest international honor and was awarded to Walker for his significant contributions to international sport.

Walker was recognized as a Main Honoree by the Sesquicentennial Honors Commission at the Durham 150 Closing Ceremony in Durham, NC on November 2, 2019. The posthumous recognition was bestowed upon 29 individuals "whose dedication, accomplishments and passion have helped shape Durham in important ways."

== Head coaching record ==
=== Football ===
Year	Team	Overall	Conference	Standing	Bowl/playoffs
Prairie View Panthers (Southwestern Athletic Conference) (1944)
1944	Prairie View	3–6	2–4	T–4th	L Prairie View
Prairie View:		3–6	2–4		
Total:		3–6			
