= Cleve Abbott =

American sports coach, athletics administrator, educator (1894–1955)

Biographical details
- Born: December 9, 1894; Yankton, South Dakota, U.S.
- Died: April 14, 1955 (aged 60); Tuskegee, Alabama, U.S.

Playing career

Football
- c. 1912–1915: South Dakota State

Coaching career (HC unless noted)

Football
- 1923–1954: Tuskegee

Basketball
- 1933–1936: Tuskegee

Administrative career (AD unless noted)
- 1923–1955: Tuskegee

Head coaching record
- Overall: 203–99–27 (football); 27–18 (basketball)
- Bowls: 4–7

Accomplishments and honors

Championships
- Football; 6 black college national (1924–1927, 1929–1930); 11 SIAC (1924–1927, 1929–1933, 1936, 1943)

Cleveland Leigh "Cleve" Abbott (December 9, 1894 – April 14, 1955) was an American college football and college basketball coach, athletics administrator, and educator. He was the head coach of the Tuskegee Golden Tigers football team from 1923 to 1954.

== Early life, education, and military service ==
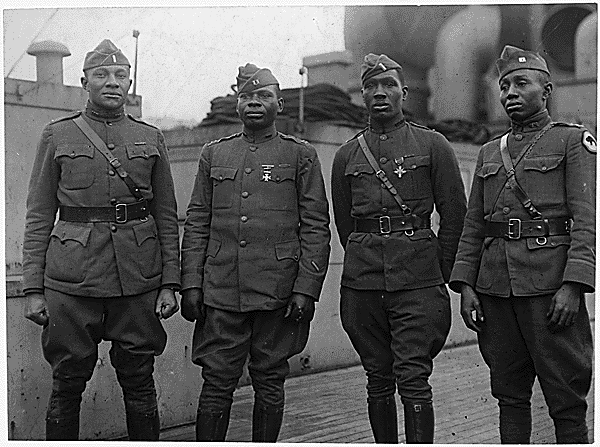
Officers of the United States Army's segregated 366th Infantry Regiment on board the RMS Aquitania, en route home from World War I service, Abbott at left

Abbott was born in Yankton, South Dakota in 1894, one of seven children to Albert B. (aka Elbert) Abbott (1862–1952) and Mollie Brown Abbott (1868–1909). He graduated from high school in Watertown, South Dakota. Abbott received his bachelor's degree in 1916 from South Dakota State College (SDSC)—now known as South Dakota State University—in Brookings, South Dakota. He was an outstanding, multi-sport athlete at Watertown High School (16 varsity sports letters) and South Dakota State (14 varsity letters).

Abbott joined the United States Army in 1917 at Camp Dodge, and served in Europe in World War I as an officer in the 366th Infantry Regiment

== Coaching career ==
After being mustered out of military service in 1919, Abbott taught at Kansas Industrial and Educational Institute—later known as Kansas Technical Institute—in Topeka, Kansas. In 1923, Abbott accepted a position as athletic director, professor, and coach at Tuskegee. Abbott was the eighth head football coach for the Tuskegee University Golden Tigers located in Tuskegee, Alabama and he held that position for 32 seasons, from 1923 until 1954. Abbott earned the respect of his peers through his team's performance and by participating in national committees for the selection of "all-American" players at the collegiate level.

He was the first African-American member of USA Track and Field Board circa 1940 and the first African-American member of the US Olympic Committee in 1946. He coached the first African-American Olympic champion, Alice Coachman (1948 high jump), and the second, Mildred McDaniel (1956 high jump).

== Personal life, death, and legacy ==
Abbott was married to Jessie Abbott (1897–1982), and had had a daughter, Jessie Ellen Abbott. He died on April 14, 1955, at the Veterans Administration Hospital in Tuskegee.

Abbott was inducted into the South Dakota Hall of Fame in September 2018.

== Head coaching record ==
=== College ===
Year	Team	Overall	Conference	Standing	Bowl/playoffs
Tuskegee Golden Tigers (Southern Intercollegiate Athletic Conference) (1923–1954)
1923	Tuskegee	7–1–1	3–1–1		
1924	Tuskegee	9–0–1	5–0	1st	
1925	Tuskegee	8–0–1	7–0	1st	
1926	Tuskegee	10–0	8–0	1st	
1927	Tuskegee	9–0–1	7–0–1	1st	
1928	Tuskegee	6–1–4	5–1–2	T–1st (Note: No conference champion was recognized by the Southern Intercollegiate Athletic Conference (SIAC) in 1928.)	
1929	Tuskegee	9–0	5–0	1st	
1930	Tuskegee	11–0–1	7–0	1st	W Prairie View
1931	Tuskegee	10–2	6–1	1st	
1932	Tuskegee	5–1	5–0	1st	L Prairie View
1933	Tuskegee	8–1–2	6–0–1	1st	
1934	Tuskegee	6–5–1	3–2–1	2nd	W Prairie View
1935	Tuskegee	8–4	5–2	3rd	
1936	Tuskegee	7–5	4–2	1st	W Prairie View
1937	Tuskegee	6–3–1	3–2–1	6th	
1938	Tuskegee	1–7–2	1–4–2	T–8th	L Prairie View
1939	Tuskegee	3–7	2–6	7th	
1940	Tuskegee	5–4	4–3	5th	
1941	Tuskegee	8–2	6–1	2nd	L Orange Blossom Classic
1942	Tuskegee	7–3	6–1	2nd	L Vulcan
1943	Tuskegee	9–2–1	4–1–1	1st	W Vulcan
1944	Tuskegee	6–4–1	5–1	2nd	L Vulcan
1945	Tuskegee	6–6–1	2–2–1	4th	L Prairie View
1946	Tuskegee	10–2	5–1	3rd	L Yam Bowl
1947	Tuskegee	6–4–1	3–2–1	T–4th	
1948	Tuskegee	4–4–1	3–2–1	5th	
1949	Tuskegee	4–6	4–3	T–6th	
1950	Tuskegee	2–5–2	2–5–2	T–12th	
1951	Tuskegee	6–3	5–3	T–7th	
1952	Tuskegee	2–6–2	1–6–2	T–15th	
1953	Tuskegee	2–6–2	1–5–2	14th	
1954	Tuskegee	3–5–1	2–5–1	12th	
Tuskegee:		203–99–27	125–62–20		
Total:		203–99–27			
National championship Conference title Conference division title or championship game berth

== See also ==
- List of college football career coaching wins leaders
