= 1936 Wiley Wildcats football team =

American college football season

1936 Wiley Wildcats football
- Conference: Southwestern Athletic Conference
- Record: 6–3–1 (3–2–1 SWAC)
- Head coach: Fred T. Long (14th season)
- Home stadium: Fair Park Stadium

1936 Southwestern Athletic Conference football standings
	Conf.					Overall
Team	W		L		T	W		L		T
Texas College +	4	–	1	–	1	5	–	2	–	2
Langston +	4	–	1	–	1	7	–	1	–	1
Wiley	3	–	2	–	1	6	–	3	–	1
Bishop	2	–	2	–	2	2	–	3	–	2
Arkansas AM&N	2	–	3	–	1	5	–	4	–	1
Prairie View	1	–	3	–	2	4	–	4	–	2
Southern	1	–	5	–	0	3	–	5	–	1
+ – Conference co-champions

The 1936 Wiley Wildcats football team represented Wiley College as a member of the Southwestern Athletic Conference (SWAC) during the 1936 college football season. Led by 14th-year head coach Fred T. Long, the Wildcats compiled an overall record of 6–3–1, with a conference record of 3–2–1, and finished third in the SWAC.

== Schedule ==
Date	Opponent	Site	Result	Attendance	Source
September 26	at Jarvis*	Hawkins, TX	W 42–2		
October 2	Langston	Fair Park Stadium; Marshall, TX	L 0–3	4,000	
October 9	Dillard*	Fair Park Stadium; Marshall, TX	W 49–6		
October 19	vs. Prairie View	Cotton Bowl; Dallas, TX (State Fair Classic)	W 7–0	12,000	
October 24	at Southern	University Stadium; Scotlandville, LA	W 18–0		
October 31	Arkansas AM&N	Fair Park Stadium; Marshall, TX	W 14–7		
November 7	Bishop	Fair Park Stadium; Marshall, TX	T 13–13		
November 14	at Tuskegee*	Alumni Bowl; Tuskegee, AL	L 2–13		
November 21	vs. Xavier (LA)*	Purple Stadium; Beaumont, TX	W 19–7	2,000	
November 26	Texas College	Fair Park Stadium; Marshall, TX	L 7–8		
*Non-conference game
