= 1932 Tuskegee Golden Tigers football team =

American college football season

1932 Tuskegee Golden Tigers football

SIAC champion

Prairie View Bowl, L 0–14 vs. Prairie View
- Conference: Southern Intercollegiate Athletic Conference
- Record: 5–1 (5–0 SIAC)
- Head coach: Cleve Abbott (10th season)
- Home stadium: Alumni Bowl

1932 Southern Intercollegiate Athletic Conference football standings
	Conf.					Overall
Team	W		L		T	W		L		T
Tuskegee $	5	–	0	–	0	5	–	1	–	0
Morris Brown	5	–	1	–	1	6	–	1	–	1
Fisk	3	–	1	–	0	6	–	2	–	0
Alabama State	2	–	1	–	1	6	–	1	–	1
Talladega	2	–	1	–	1	?	–	?	–	?
Clark (GA)	3	–	2	–	1	4	–	3	–	1
South Carolina State	2	–	2	–	0	5	–	2	–	0
Morehouse	2	–	4	–	0	3	–	4	–	1
Lane	0	–	1	–	0	?	–	?	–	?
Edward Waters	0	–	2	–	0	?	–	?	–	?
Miles	0	–	2	–	0	4	–	2	–	0
Florida A&M	0	–	3	–	0	5	–	3	–	0
Knoxville	0	–	6	–	0	2	–	7	–	0
$ – Conference champion

The 1932 Tuskegee Golden Tigers football team represented the Tuskegee Normal and Industrial Institute—now known as Tuskegee University—as a member of the Southern Intercollegiate Athletic Conference (SIAC) during the 1932 college football season. Led by tenth-year head coach Cleve Abbott, the Golden Tigers compiled an overall record of 5–1 with a mark of 5–0 in conference play, winning the SIAC title. Tuskegee was invited to the Prairie View Bowl, where the Tigers lost to Prairie View. The team played home games at the Alumni Bowl in Tuskegee, Alabama.

== Schedule ==
Date	Time	Opponent	Site	Result	Attendance	Source
October 8	2:00 p.m.	Knoxville	Alumni Bowl; Tuskegee, AL	W 39–7		
October 28	1:00 p.m.	at South Carolina State	Orangeburg County Fair; Orangeburg, SC	W 13–7	2,000	
November 5		Morehouse^{†}	Alumni Bowl; Tuskegee, AL	W 13–6		
November 11	1:00 p.m.	at Clark (GA)	Ponce de Leon Park; Alanta, GA	W 12–6	5,000	
November 24	2:00 p.m.	at Alabama State	Cramton Bowl; Montgomery, AL	W 7–0	5,000	
December 30	2:00 p.m.	vs. Prairie View*	Buffalo Stadium; Houston, TX (Prairie View Bowl)	L 0–14	3,500	
*Non-conference game; ^{†}Homecoming; All times are in Central time

== B team schedule ==
Date	Opponent	Site	Result	Source
October 28	24th Infantry, Fort Benning	Alumni Bowl; Tuskegee, AL	L 0–6	
