= 1933 Langston Lions football team =

American college football season

1933 Langston Lions football

SWAC co-champion

Prairie View Bowl, L 7–20 vs. Prairie View
- Conference: Southwestern Athletic Conference
- Record: 9–1 (4–1 SWAC)
- Head coach: Caesar Felton Gayles (4th season)
- Home stadium: Anderson Field

1933 Southwestern Athletic Conference football standings
	Conf.					Overall
Team	W		L		T	W		L		T
Langston +	4	–	1	–	0	9	–	1	–	0
Prairie View +	4	–	1	–	0	7	–	1	–	0
Wiley +	4	–	1	–	0	9	–	2	–	0
Texas College	1	–	3	–	1	4	–	3	–	1
Bishop	1	–	3	–	1	1	–	6	–	1
Samuel Huston	0	–	5	–	0	2	–	6	–	0
+ – Conference co-champions

The 1933 Langston Lions football team represented Oklahoma Colored Agricultural and Normal University (now known as Langston University) as a member of the Southwestern Athletic Conference (SWAC) during the 1933 college football season. Led by fourth-year head coach Caesar Felton Gayles, the Lions compiled an overall record of 9–1, with a conference record of 4–1, finished as SWAC co-champion, and with a loss against Prairie View in the Prairie View Bowl.

== Schedule ==
Date	Opponent	Site	Result	Attendance	Source
September 30	Western College (MO)*	Anderson Field; Langston, OK	W 64–0		
October 7	Western University (KS)*	Anderson Field; Langston, OK	W 40–0		
October 14	at Bishop	Marshall, TX	W 16–0		
October 21	at Samuel Huston	Samuel Huston Field; Austin, TX	W 33–0		
November 4	Wilberforce State*	Anderson Field; Langston, OK	Canceled		
November 4	at Texas College	Steer Stadium; Tyler, TX	W 22–6		
November 11	at Fisk*	Sulphur Dell; Nashville, TN	W 20–0		
November 18	Wiley	Anderson Field; Langston, OK	W 10–6	2,500	
November 30	Lincoln (MO)*	Anderson Field; Langston, OK	W 46–0		
December 16	vs. Kentucky State*	Texas League Park; Oklahoma City, OK	W 6–0		
January 1	vs. Prairie View	Buffalo Stadium; Houston, TX (Prairie View Bowl)	L 7–20	4,000	
*Non-conference game
