= 1925 Tuskegee Golden Tigers football team =

American college football season

1925 Tuskegee Golden Tigers football

Black college national co-champion SIAC champion
- Conference: Southern Intercollegiate Athletic Conference
- Record: 8–0–1 (7–0 SIAC)
- Head coach: Cleve Abbott (3rd season)
- Captain: Tadlock
- Home stadium: Alumni Bowl

The 1925 Tuskegee Golden Tigers football team represented the Tuskegee Normal and Industrial Institute—now known as Tuskegee University—as a member of the Southern Intercollegiate Athletic Conference (SIAC) during the 1925 college football season. In its third season under head coach Cleve Abbott, Tuskegee compiled an 8–0–1 record, won the SIAC championship, shut out eight of nine opponents, and outscored all opponents by a total of 244 to 6. The team was recognized as the black college national champion. The team played home games at the Alumni Bowl in Tuskegee, Alabama.

== Schedule ==
Date	Time	Opponent	Site	Result	Attendance	Source
September 26		24th Infantry, Fort Benning*	Alumni Bowl; Tuskegee, AL	T 0–0	2,500	
October 10		Morris Brown	Alumni Bowl; Tuskegee, AL	W 19–0	4,000	
October 17		Atlanta^{†}	Alumni Bowl; Tuskegee, AL	W 20–0	5,000	
October 24		at Morehouse	Morehouse campus; Atlanta, GA	W 27–6		
October 30		Florida A&M	Tuskegee, AL	W 40–0		
November 7	2:30 p.m.	at Alabama State	Cramton Bowl; Montgomery, AL (rivalry)	W 14–0	4,500	
November 14		Fisk	Alumni Bowl; Tuskegee, AL	W 28–0	4,000	
November 21		New Orleans*	Alumni Bowl; Tuskegee, AL	W 41–0	3,000	
November 26		Talladega	Alumni Bowl; Tuskegee, AL	W 55–0		
*Non-conference game; ^{†}Homecoming; All times are in Central time
