= 1931 Wiley Wildcats football team =

American college football season

1931 Wiley Wildcats football
- Conference: Southwestern Athletic Conference
- Record: 6–3–1 (3–1 SWAC)
- Head coach: Fred T. Long (9th season)
- Home stadium: Wiley Field; Fair Park Stadium

1931 Southwestern Athletic Conference football standings
	Conf.					Overall
Team	W		L		T	W		L		T
Prairie View $	4	–	0	–	0	9	–	1	–	1
Wiley	3	–	1	–	0	6	–	3	–	1
Bishop	2	–	2	–	0	?	–	?	–	?
Samuel Huston	0	–	3	–	1	?	–	?	–	?
Texas College	0	–	3	–	1	?	–	?	–	?
$ – Conference champion

The 1931 Wiley Wildcats football team represented Wiley College as a member of the Southwestern Athletic Conference (SWAC) during the 1931 college football season. Led by ninth-year head coach Fred T. Long, the Wildcats compiled an overall record of 6–3–1, with a conference record of 3–1, and finished second in the SWAC.

== Schedule ==
Date	Opponent	Site	Result	Attendance	Source
September 25	Houston Junior College*	Fair Park Stadium; Marshall, TX	W 35–6	6,000	
October 2	vs. Xavier (LA)*	Beidenham Park; Shreveport, LA	W 49–0		
October 10	at Tuskegee*	Alumni Bowl; Tuskegee, AL	L 0–13		
October 19	vs. Prairie View	Fair Park Stadium; Dallas, TX (State Fair Classic)	L 0–20		
October 24	Texas College	Wiley Field; Marshall, TX	W 39–0		
October 26	vs. Southern*	State Fair Stadium; Shreveport, LA (State Fair Classic)	L 7–14		
October 31	at Langston*	Anderson Field; Langston, OK	T 7–7		
November 14	vs. Fisk*	Buffalo Stadium; Houston, TX	W 24–0		
November 21	at Samuel Huston	Austin, TX	W 38–6		
November 26	at Bishop	Bishop Field; Marshall, TX	W 20–6		
*Non-conference game
