= 1942 Prairie View Panthers football team =

American college football season

1942 Prairie View Panthers football

Prairie View Bowl, L 13–18 vs. Langston
- Conference: Southwestern Athletic Conference
- Record: 5–2 (3–1 SWAC)
- Head coach: Sam B. Taylor (13th season)
- Home stadium: Blackshear Field

1942 Southwestern Athletic Conference football standings
	Conf.					Overall
Team	W		L		T	W		L		T
Texas College $	4	–	0	–	0	7	–	1	–	0
Prairie View	3	–	1	–	0	5	–	2	–	0
Langston	1	–	2	–	1	6	–	2	–	1
Wiley	1	–	3	–	0	3	–	4	–	0
Southern	0	–	3	–	1	4	–	4	–	1
$ – Conference champion

The 1942 Prairie View Panthers football team was an American football team that represented Prairie View State Normal & Industrial College (now known as Prairie View A&M University) as a member of the Southwestern Athletic Conference (SWAC) during the 1942 college football season. In their 13th season under head coach Sam B. Taylor, the Panthers compiled an overall record of 5–2, with a mark of 3–1 in conference play, and finished second in the SWAC.

== Schedule ==
Date	Opponent	Site	Result	Attendance	Source
October 3	Texas College	Blackshear Field; Prairie View, TX	L 0–6		
October 10	at Xavier (LA)*	Xavier Stadium; New Orleans, LA	W 14–0		
October 19	vs. Wiley	Cotton Bowl; Dallas, TX	W 6–0	10,000	
November 21	vs. Langston	Page Stadium; Oklahoma City, OK	W 13–12		
November 28	Southern	Blackshear Field; Prairie View, TX	W 24–0		
December 11	vs. Camp Wallace (TX)*	Houston, TX	W 33–0		
January 1	vs. Langston*	Houston H.S. Stadium; Houston, TX (Prairie View Bowl)	L 13–18	5,000	
*Non-conference game
