= 1940 Wiley Wildcats football team =

American college football season

1940 Wiley Wildcats football
- Conference: Southwestern Athletic Conference
- Record: 3–5–1 (1–4–1 SWAC)
- Head coach: Fred T. Long (18th season)
- Home stadium: Fair Park Stadium

1940 Southwestern Athletic Conference football standings
	Conf.					Overall
Team	W		L		T	W		L		T
Southern +	5	–	1	–	0	8	–	1	–	0
Langston +	5	–	1	–	0	6	–	3	–	0
Prairie View	4	–	2	–	0	6	–	3	–	0
Texas College	3	–	2	–	1	4	–	2	–	1
Bishop	2	–	4	–	0	4	–	4	–	0
Wiley	1	–	4	–	1	3	–	5	–	1
Arkansas AM&N	0	–	6	–	0	3	–	8	–	0
+ – Conference co-champions

The 1940 Wiley Wildcats football team represented Wiley College as a member of the Southwestern Athletic Conference (SWAC) during the 1940 college football season. Led by 18th-year head coach Fred T. Long, the Wildcats compiled an overall record of 3–5–1, with a conference record of 1–4–1, and finished sixth in the SWAC.

== Schedule ==
Date	Opponent	Site	Result	Attendance	Source
September 28	Jarvis*	Fair Park Stadium; Marshall, TX	W 30–0	5,000	
October 4	Arkansas AM&N	Fair Park Stadium; Marshall, TX	W 7–6		
October 14	vs. Prairie View	Cotton Bowl; Dallas, TX (State Fair Classic (TX))	L 0–18	5,000	
October 28	vs. Southern	State Fair Stadium; Shreveport, LA (State Fair Classic (LA))	L 0–19		
November 2	at Samuel Huston*	Austin, TX	W 13–0	1,200	
November 9	at Langston	Anderson Field; Langston, OK	L 0–14		
November 16	at Xavier (LA)*	Xavier Stadium; New Orleans, LA	L 7–8		
November 23	at Texas College	Steer Stadium; Tyler, TX	T 12–12		
November 30	vs. Bishop	Fair Park Stadium; Marshall, TX	L 3–6	5,000	
*Non-conference game
