= 1930 Wiley Wildcats football team =

American college football season

1930 Wiley Wildcats football

SWAC champion
- Conference: Southwestern Athletic Conference
- Record: 8–1–1 (4–0 SWAC)
- Head coach: Fred T. Long (8th season)
- Home stadium: Wiley Field

1930 Southwestern Athletic Conference football standings
	Conf.					Overall
Team	W		L		T	W		L		T
Wiley $	4	–	0	–	0	8	–	1	–	1
Prairie View	3	–	1	–	0	8	–	3	–	0
Bishop	2	–	2	–	0	2	–	5	–	0
Samuel Huston	1	–	3	–	0	1	–	5	–	0
Texas College	0	–	4	–	0	?	–	?	–	?
$ – Conference champion

The 1930 Wiley Wildcats football team represented Wiley College as a member of the Southwestern Athletic Conference (SWAC) during the 1930 college football season. Led by eighth-year head coach Fred T. Long, the Wildcats compiled an overall record of 8–1–1, with a conference record of 4–0, and finished as SWAC champion.

== Schedule ==
Date	Opponent	Site	Result	Attendance	Source
September 26	Houston Junior College*	Fair Park; Marshall, TX	W 12–0		
October 4	at Xavier (LA)*	Xavier Stadium; New Orleans, LA	W 43–0		
October 11	at Tuskegee*	Alumni Bowl; Tuskegee, AL	L 0–26		
October 20	vs. Prairie View	Fair Park Stadium; Dallas, TX	W 17–13		
October 27	vs. Southern*	State Fair Stadium; Shreveport, LA	T 6–6	600	
November 1	Philander Smith*	Wiley Field; Marshall, TX	W 66–6		
November 7	Samuel Huston	Wiley Field; Marshall, TX	W 53–7		
November 11	at Straight*	New Orleans, LA	W 36–0		
November 22	at Texas College	Steer Stadium; Tyler, TX	W 78–0		
November 27	Bishop	Wiley Field; Marshall, TX	W 16–0		
*Non-conference game
