= 1939 Langston Lions football team =

American college football season

1939 Langston Lions football

Black college national co-champion SWAC champion
- Conference: Southwestern Athletic Conference
- Record: 7–0–1 (5–0–1 SWAC)
- Head coach: "Zip" Gayles (10th season)
- Home stadium: Anderson Field

1939 Southwestern Athletic Conference football standings
	Conf.					Overall
Team	W		L		T	W		L		T
Langston $	5	–	0	–	1	7	–	0	–	1
Prairie View	3	–	2	–	1	5	–	2	–	1
Arkansas AM&N	3	–	2	–	1	6	–	3	–	1
Bishop	2	–	2	–	2	3	–	2	–	2
Wiley	3	–	3	–	0	6	–	5	–	0
Southern	1	–	4	–	1	4	–	5	–	1
Texas College	1	–	5	–	0	1	–	6	–	1
$ – Conference champion

The 1939 Langston Lions football team was an American football team that represented Langston College as a member of the Southwestern Athletic Conference during the 1939 college football season. In their 10th season under head coach "Zip" Gayles, the team compiled an overall record of 7–0–1 with mark of 5–0–1 in conference play, won the SWAC championship, shut out four of eight opponents, and outscored all opponents by a total of 83 to 26. The 1939 Langston team was recognized as the black college national champion.

== Schedule ==
Date	Opponent	Site	Result	Attendance	Source
October 7	at Morehouse*	Atlanta, GA	W 6–0		
October 14	at Southern	Scotlandville, LA	W 6–0	3,000	
October 21	vs. Bishop	Farrington Field; Fort Worth, TX	W 17–7		
October 28	at Texas College	Tyler, TX	W 18–6		
November 4	Xavier (LA)*	Anderson Field; Langston, OK	W 3–0		
November 11	Wiley^{†}	Anderson Field; Langston, OK	W 14–6		
November 18	Arkansas AM&N	Anderson Field; Langston, OK	W 12–0		
November 25	at Prairie View	Prairie View, TX	T 7–7		
*Non-conference game; ^{†}Homecoming
