= 1944 Texas College Steers football team =

American college football season

1944 Texas College Steers football

SWAC co-champion

Flower Bowl, W 18–0 vs. North Carolina A&T
- Conference: Southwestern Athletic Conference
- Record: 8–1 (5–1 SWAC)
- Head coach: Alexander Durley (3rd season)
- Home stadium: Steer Stadium

1944 Southwestern Athletic Conference football standings
	Conf.					Overall
Team	W		L		T	W		L		T
Texas College +	5	–	1	–	0	8	–	1	–	0
Wiley +	5	–	1	–	0	8	–	1	–	0
Langston +	5	–	1	–	0	6	–	2	–	1
Southern	2	–	4	–	0	4	–	4	–	0
Samuel Huston	2	–	4	–	0	3	–	5	–	0
Prairie View	2	–	4	–	0	3	–	6	–	0
Arkansas AM&N	0	–	6	–	0	1	–	7	–	0
+ – Conference co-champions

The 1944 Texas College Steers football team was an American football team that represented Texas College as a member of the Southwestern Athletic Conference (SWAC) during the 1944 college football season. Led by third-year head coach Alexander Durley, the Steers compiled an overall record of 8–1, with a conference mark of 5–1 and finished as SWAC champion.

== Schedule ==
Date	Opponent	Site	Result	Attendance	Source
September 30	Bryan Air Field*	Steer Stadium; Tyler, TX	W 46–6		
October 7	Samuel Huston	Steer Stadium; Tyler, TX	W 33–0		
October 14	at Arkansas AM&N	Athletic Field; Pine Bluff, AR	W 50–0		
October 21	vs. Langston	Farrington Field; Fort Worth, TX	W 7–0		
November 4	Southern^{†}	Steer Stadium; Tyler, TX	W 28–20		
November 11	at Prairie View	Blackshear Field; Prairie View, TX	W 26–6	4,000	
November 18	at Xavier (LA)*	Xavier Stadium; New Orleans, LA	W 25–7		
November 30	Wiley	Steer Stadium; Tyler, TX	L 12–16		
January 1	vs. North Carolina A&T*	Durkee Field; Jacksonville, FL (Flower Bowl)	W 18–0		
*Non-conference game; ^{†}Homecoming
