= 1943 Prairie View Panthers football team =

American college football season

1943 Prairie View Panthers football

Prairie View Bowl, W 6–0 vs. Wiley
- Conference: Southwestern Athletic Conference
- Record: 6–2–1 ( SWAC)
- Head coach: Sam B. Taylor (14th season)
- Home stadium: Blackshear Field

1943 Southwestern Athletic Conference football standings
	Conf.			Overall
Team	W	L	T	W	L	T
No champion

The 1943 Prairie View Panthers football team was an American football team that represented Prairie View State Normal & Industrial College (now known as Prairie View A&M University) as a member of the Southwestern Athletic Conference (SWAC) during the 1943 college football season. In their 14th season under head coach Sam B. Taylor, the Panthers compiled an overall record of 6–2–1.

== Schedule ==
Date	Opponent	Site	Result	Attendance	Source
October 9	Samuel Huston	Blackshear Field; Prairie View, TX	W 14–0		
October 16	vs. Wiley	Cotton Bowl; Dallas, TX	T 0–0	10,000	
October 30	vs. Langston	Page Stadium; Oklahoma City, OK	W 36–14		
November 6	at Texas College	Steer Stadium; Tyler, TX	L 0–13		
November 13	Bryan Army Air Field*	Blackshear Field; Prairie View, TX	W 30–0		
November 20	Langston^{†}	Blackshear Field; Prairie View, TX	W 61–0		
November 25	at Samuel Huston	Austin H.S. Stadium; Austin, TX			
January 1	vs. Wiley*	Buffalo Stadium; Houston, TX (Prairie View Bowl)	W 6–0		
*Non-conference game; ^{†}Homecoming
