= 1933 Prairie View Panthers football team =

American college football season

1933 Prairie View Panthers football

SWAC co-champion

Prairie View Bowl, W 20–7 vs. Langston
- Conference: Southwestern Athletic Conference
- Record: 7–1 (4–1 SWAC)
- Head coach: Sam B. Taylor (4th season)
- Home stadium: Blackshear Field

1933 Southwestern Athletic Conference football standings
	Conf.					Overall
Team	W		L		T	W		L		T
Langston +	4	–	1	–	0	9	–	1	–	0
Prairie View +	4	–	1	–	0	7	–	1	–	0
Wiley +	4	–	1	–	0	9	–	2	–	0
Texas College	1	–	3	–	1	4	–	3	–	1
Bishop	1	–	3	–	1	1	–	6	–	1
Samuel Huston	0	–	5	–	0	2	–	6	–	0
+ – Conference co-champions

The 1933 Prairie View Panthers football team represented Prairie View Normal and Industrial College (now known as Prairie View A&M University) as a member of the Southwestern Athletic Conference (SWAC) during the 1933 college football season. Led by fourth-year head coach Sam B. Taylor, the Panthers compiled an overall record of 7–1, with a conference record of 4–1, finished as SWAC co-champion, and with a victory over Langston in the Prairie View Bowl.

== Schedule ==
Date	Opponent	Site	Result	Attendance	Source
October 14	Paul Quinn*	Blackshear Field; Prairie View, TX	W 40–0		
October 16	vs. Wiley	Fair Park Stadium; Dallas, TX	L 0–6	7,000	
October 28	Arkansas AM&N*^{†}	Blackshear Field; Prairie View, TX	W 13–0		
November	at Samuel Huston	Samuel Huston Field; Austin, TX	W 13–0		
November 25	at Bishop	Marshall, TX	W 25–0		
November 30	at Southern*	University Stadium; Baton Rouge, LA	W 14–0	3,500	
December 16	vs. Texas College	Tech Stadium; San Antonio, TX	W 26–6		
January 1	vs. Langston	Buffalo Stadium; Houston, TX (Prairie View Bowl)	W 20–7	4,000	
*Non-conference game; ^{†}Homecoming
