= 1939 Florida A&M Rattlers football team =

American college football season

1939 Florida A&M Rattlers football

Orange Blossom Classic, W 42–0 vs. Wiley
- Conference: Southern Intercollegiate Athletic Conference
- Record: 7–2–1 (5–2 SIAC)
- Head coach: William M. Bell (4th season)
- Home stadium: College Field

1939 Southern Intercollegiate Athletic Conference football standings
	Conf.					Overall
Team	W		L		T	W		L		T
Alabama State $	5	–	1	–	2	6	–	2	–	2
Florida A&M	5	–	2	–	0	7	–	2	–	1
Xavier (LA)	4	–	2	–	0	5	–	5	–	0
Lane	2	–	2	–	1	4	–	3	–	1
Morris Brown	5	–	2	–	2	7	–	2	–	2
Morehouse	3	–	2	–	1	4	–	3	–	1
Tuskegee	2	–	6	–	0	3	–	7	–	0
South Carolina State	3	–	3	–	1	4	–	3	–	1
Knoxville	3	–	4	–	1	4	–	4	–	1
Clark (GA)	2	–	4	–	0	3	–	4	–	0
Fisk	0	–	5	–	0	0	–	7	–	0
Benedict	2	–	1	–	0	5	–	2	–	1
LeMoyne	2	–	3	–	0	3	–	4	–	1
Talladega	1	–	2	–	0	1	–	3	–	1
$ – Conference champion; Standings were based on Dickinson System ratings. Benedict, LeMoyne, and Talladega were not rated.

The 1939 Florida A&M Rattlers football team represented Florida A&M University as a member of the Southern Intercollegiate Athletic Conference (SIAC) during the 1939 college football season. Led by fourth-year head coach William M. Bell, the Rattlers finished third in the SIAC with an overall record of 7–2–1 and a mark of 5–2 in conference play, and finished second in the SIAC. Florida A&M defeated Wiley in the Orange Blossom Classic.

== Schedule ==
Date	Opponent	Site	Result	Attendance	Source
October 7	North Carolina A&T*	College Field; Tallahassee, FL	T 0–0		
October 14	at Alabama State	Hornet Stadium; Montgomery, AL	L 6–9		
October 21	at Tuskegee	Alumni Bowl; Tuskegee, AL	W 20–6	3,500	
October 28	Morris Brown^{†}	College Field; Tallahassee, FL	W 14–12	5,000	
November 4	at Lane	Lane Field; Jackson, TN	L 7–25		
November 11	North Carolina College*	College Field; Tallahassee, FL	W 20–7		
November 11	LeMoyne	College Field; Tallahassee, FL	W 20–7		
November 18	at South Carolina State	State College Stadium; Orangeburg, SC	W 13–0	3,500	
November 30	Xavier (LA)	College Field; Tallahassee, FL	W 33–0		
December 9	vs. Wiley*	Tinker Field; Orlando, FL (Orange Blossom Classic)	W 42–0	6,000	
*Non-conference game; ^{†}Homecoming
