= 1944 Prairie View Panthers football team =

American college football season

1944 Prairie View Panthers football

Prairie View Bowl, L 0–26 vs. Wiley
- Conference: Southwestern Athletic Conference
- Record: 3–6 (2–4 SWAC)
- Head coach: LeRoy T. Walker (1st season)
- Home stadium: Blackshear Field

1944 Southwestern Athletic Conference football standings
	Conf.					Overall
Team	W		L		T	W		L		T
Texas College +	5	–	1	–	0	8	–	1	–	0
Wiley +	5	–	1	–	0	8	–	1	–	0
Langston +	5	–	1	–	0	6	–	2	–	1
Southern	2	–	4	–	0	4	–	4	–	0
Samuel Huston	2	–	4	–	0	3	–	5	–	0
Prairie View	2	–	4	–	0	3	–	6	–	0
Arkansas AM&N	0	–	6	–	0	1	–	7	–	0
+ – Conference co-champions

The 1944 Prairie View Panthers football team was an American football team that represented Prairie View State Normal & Industrial College (now known as Prairie View A&M University) as a member of the Southwestern Athletic Conference (SWAC) during the 1944 college football season. In their first season under head coach LeRoy T. Walker, the Panthers compiled an overall record of 3–6, with a mark of 2–4 in conference play, and finished tied for fourth in the SWAC.

== Schedule ==
Date	Opponent	Site	Result	Attendance	Source
September 30	Samuel Huston	Blackshear Field; Prairie View, TX	L 0–6		
October 16	vs. Wiley	Cotton Bowl; Dallas, TX	L 0–28	14,000	
October 21	at Xavier (LA)*	Xavier Stadium; New Orleans, LA	L 6–7		
October 28	at Arkansas AM&N	Athletic Field; Pine Bluff, AR	W 40–6		
November 11	Texas College	Blackshear Field; Prairie View, TX	L 6–26	4,000	
November 18	at Samuel Huston	Austin, TX	W 2–0		
November 25	vs. Langston	Page Stadium; Oklahoma City, OK	L 6–15		
December 2	at Southern	University Stadium; Scotlandville, LA	W 6–8		
January 1	vs. Wiley*	Buffalo Stadium; Houston, TX (Prairie View Bowl)	L 0–26	7,000	
*Non-conference game
