= 1942 Southern Jaguars football team =

American college football season

1942 Southern Jaguars football

Flower Bowl, L 12–14 vs. North Carolina A&T
- Conference: Southwestern Athletic Conference
- Record: 4–4–1 (0–3–1 SWAC)
- Head coach: Ace Mumford (7th season)
- Home stadium: University Stadium

1942 Southwestern Athletic Conference football standings
	Conf.					Overall
Team	W		L		T	W		L		T
Texas College $	4	–	0	–	0	7	–	1	–	0
Prairie View	3	–	1	–	0	5	–	2	–	0
Langston	1	–	2	–	1	6	–	2	–	1
Wiley	1	–	3	–	0	3	–	4	–	0
Southern	0	–	3	–	1	4	–	4	–	1
$ – Conference champion

The 1942 Southern Jaguars football team was an American football team that represented Southern University as a member of the Southwestern Athletic Conference (SWAC) during the 1942 college football season. Led by Ace Mumford in his seventh season as head coach, the Jaguars compiled an overall record of 4–4–1, with a mark of 0–3–1 in conference play, and finished fifth in the SWAC.

The team played its home games at University Stadium in Scotlandville, Louisiana (which has since been annexed into the Baton Rouge city limits).

== Schedule ==
Date	Opponent	Site	Result	Attendance	Source
October 3	Fort Sill*	University Stadium; Scotlandville, LA	W 34–0	1,500	
October 10	at Langston	Page Stadium; Oklahoma City, OK	T 6–6		
October 17	Lane*	University Stadium; Scotlandville, LA	W 20–0		
October 31	Philander Smith*	University Stadium; Scotlandville, LA	W 57–0		
November 7	at Texas College	Steer Stadium; Tyler, TX	L 6–33		
November 14	Lincoln (MO)*^{†}	University Stadium; Scotlandville, LA	W 34–0		
November 21	Wiley	Wiley Field; Marshall, TX	L 0–7	4,000	
November 28	at Prairie View	Blackshear Field; Prairie View, TX	L 0–24		
January 1	vs. North Carolina A&T*	Durkee Field; Jacksonville, FL (Flower Bowl)	L 12–14		
*Non-conference game; ^{†}Homecoming
