= 1934 Wiley Wildcats football team =

American college football season

1934 Wiley Wildcats football
- Conference: Southwestern Athletic Conference
- Record: 5–4–1 (1–2–1 SWAC)
- Head coach: Fred T. Long (12th season)
- Home stadium: Fair Park Stadium

1934 Southwestern Athletic Conference football standings
	Conf.					Overall
Team	W		L		T	W		L		T
Texas College $	4	–	0	–	1	9	–	0	–	1
Langston	3	–	1	–	0	7	–	2	–	0
Southern	1	–	1	–	0	4	–	3	–	0
Prairie View	2	–	3	–	0	5	–	4	–	0
Wiley	1	–	2	–	1	5	–	4	–	1
Samuel Huston	0	–	4	–	0	?	–	?	–	?
Bishop	0	–	0	–	0	6	–	0	–	1
$ – Conference champion

The 1934 Wiley Wildcats football team represented Wiley College as a member of the Southwestern Athletic Conference (SWAC) during the 1934 college football season. Led by 12th-year head coach Fred T. Long, the Wildcats compiled an overall record of 5–4–1, with a conference record of 1–2–1, and finished fifth in the SWAC.

== Schedule ==
Date	Opponent	Site	Result	Attendance	Source
October 5	Jarvis*	Fair Park Stadium; Marshall, TX	W 20–7		
October 6	at Xavier (LA)*	Xavier Stadium; New Orleans, LA	W 45–0		
October 15	vs. Prairie View	State Fair Stadium; Dallas, TX (State Fair Classic)	L 12–13	8,500	
October 20	at Texas College	Tyler, TX	T 7–7	2,000	
November 5	at Wilberforce*	University of Dayton Stadium; Dayton, OH	W 6–2	2,000	
November 10	Langston	Fair Park Stadium; Marshall, TX	L 0–21		
November 17	at Tuskegee*	Alumni Bowl; Tuskegee, AL	W 18–7		
November 24	at Samuel Huston	Austin, TX	W 7–6		
November 29	at Arkansas AM&N*	Athletic Field; Pine Bluff, AR	L 2–4		
December 8	Kentucky State*^{†}	Fair Park Stadium; Marshall, TX	L 0–33	2,000	
*Non-conference game; ^{†}Homecoming
