= 1935 Wiley Wildcats football team =

American college football season

1935 Wiley Wildcats football

Prairie View Bowl, W 7–6 vs. Prairie View
- Conference: Southwestern Athletic Conference
- Record: 8–0–3 (3–0–3 SWAC)
- Head coach: Fred T. Long (13th season)
- Home stadium: Wiley Field; Fair Park Stadium

1935 Southwestern Athletic Conference football standings
	Conf.					Overall
Team	W		L		T	W		L		T
Texas College $	5	–	0	–	1	9	–	0	–	1
Wiley	3	–	0	–	3	8	–	0	–	3
Bishop	3	–	2	–	1	7	–	2	–	1
Prairie View	1	–	1	–	4	4	–	3	–	4
Langston	1	–	3	–	2	2	–	3	–	2
Southern	1	–	4	–	1	1	–	7	–	1
Samuel Huston	1	–	5	–	0	1	–	6	–	0
$ – Conference champion

The 1935 Wiley Wildcats football team represented Wiley College as a member of the Southwestern Athletic Conference (SWAC) during the 1935 college football season. Led by 13th-year head coach Fred T. Long, the Wildcats compiled an overall record of 8–0–3, with a conference record of 3–0–3, and finished second in the SWAC.

== Schedule ==
Date	Opponent	Site	Result	Attendance	Source
September 27	Paul Quinn*	Wiley Field; Marshall, TX	W 47–7		
October 4	Bishop	Fair Park Stadium; Marshall, TX	W 6–0	4,200	
October 12	at Arkansas AM&N*	Athletic Field; Pine Bluff, AR	W 28–6		
October 21	vs. Prairie View	State Fair Stadium; Dallas, TX (State Fair Classic)	T 0–0	3,000	
October 26	Southern	Fair Park Stadium; Marshall, TX	W 34–0		
November 9	at Langston	Anderson Field; Langston, OK	T 0–0	10,000	
November 16	at Samuel Huston	Austin, TX	W 71–0		
November 22	at Dillard*	Dillard Athletic Field; New Orleans, LA	W 67–0		
November 28	Texas College	Fair Park Stadium; Marshall, TX	T 0–0	4,000	
December 7	Tuskegee*	Fair Park Stadium; Marshall, TX	W 12–0		
January 1	vs. Prairie View*	Buffalo Stadium; Houston, TX (Prairie View Bowl)	W 7–6	2,500	
*Non-conference game
