= 1939 Wiley Wildcats football team =

American college football season

1939 Wiley Wildcats football

Orange Blossom Classic, L 0–42 vs. Florida A&M
- Conference: Southwestern Athletic Conference
- Record: 6–5 (3–3 SWAC)
- Head coach: Fred T. Long (17th season)
- Home stadium: Wiley Field

1939 Southwestern Athletic Conference football standings
	Conf.					Overall
Team	W		L		T	W		L		T
Langston $	5	–	0	–	1	7	–	0	–	1
Prairie View	3	–	2	–	1	5	–	2	–	1
Arkansas AM&N	3	–	2	–	1	6	–	3	–	1
Bishop	2	–	2	–	2	3	–	2	–	2
Wiley	3	–	3	–	0	6	–	5	–	0
Southern	1	–	4	–	1	4	–	5	–	1
Texas College	1	–	5	–	0	1	–	6	–	1
$ – Conference champion

The 1939 Wiley Wildcats football team represented Wiley College as a member of the Southwestern Athletic Conference (SWAC) during the 1939 college football season. Led by 17th-year head coach Fred T. Long, the Wildcats compiled an overall record of 6–5, with a conference record of 3–3, and finished fifth in the SWAC.

== Schedule ==
Date	Opponent	Site	Result	Attendance	Source
September 30	at Jarvis*	Hawkins, TX	W 19–7		
October 7	at Arkansas AM&N	Athletic Field; Pine Bluff, AR	L 0–3		
October 16	vs. Prairie View	Cotton Bowl; Dallas, TX (State Fair Classic (TX))	W 13–6		
October 21	at Kentucky State*	Alumni Field; Frankfort, KY	L 0–13	4,500	
October 30	vs. Southern	State Fair Stadium; Shreveport, LA (State Fair Classic (LA))	W 12–9		
November 4	at Tillotson*	Austin, TX	W 20–0		
November 11	at Langston	Anderson Field; Langston, OK	L 6–14		
November 17	vs. Xavier (LA)*	Municipal Stadium; Waco, TX	W 6–0		
November 24	Texas College	Wiley Field; Marshall, TX	W 20–6		
December 2	vs. Bishop	Recreational Center Stadium; Marshall, TX	L 6–7	5,000	
December 9	vs. Florida A&M*	Tinker Field; Orlando, FL (Orange Blossom Classic)	L 0–42	6,000	
*Non-conference game
