= 1934 Texas College Steers football team =

American college football season

1934 Texas College Steers football

SWAC champion
- Conference: Southwestern Athletic Conference
- Record: 9–0–1 (4–0–1 SWAC)
- Head coach: Ace Mumford (4th season)

1934 Southwestern Athletic Conference football standings
	Conf.					Overall
Team	W		L		T	W		L		T
Texas College $	4	–	0	–	1	9	–	0	–	1
Langston	3	–	1	–	0	7	–	2	–	0
Southern	1	–	1	–	0	4	–	3	–	0
Prairie View	2	–	3	–	0	5	–	4	–	0
Wiley	1	–	2	–	1	5	–	4	–	1
Samuel Huston	0	–	4	–	0	?	–	?	–	?
Bishop	0	–	0	–	0	6	–	0	–	1
$ – Conference champion

The 1934 Texas College Steers football team was an American football team that represented Texas College as a member of the Southwestern Athletic Conference (SWAC) during the 1934 college football season. Led by fourth-year head coach Ace Mumford, the team compiled an overall record of 9–0–1 record with a conference mark of 4–0–1, winning the SWAC title.

== Schedule ==
Date	Time	Opponent	Site	Result	Attendance	Source
September 27		vs. Shorter (AR)*	East Texas Fair Park; Tyler, TX	W 20–0		
October 13		at Arkansas AM&N*	Pine Bluff, AR	W 19–7		
October 20		Wiley	Tyler, TX	T 7–7	2,000	
October 26	3:00 p.m.	Mary Allen*	Texas College Stadium; Tyler, TX	W 102–0		
November 3		at Prairie View	Prairie View, TX	W 17–7		
November 10		Southern	Tyler, TX	W 54–7		
November 17		Samuel Huston	Tyler, TX	W 51–0		
November 24	2:30 p.m.	Jarvis Christian*	Steer Stadium; Tyler, TX	W 56–6		
November 30	2:30 p.m.	Paul Quinn*	Steer Stadium; Tyler, TX	W 37–0		
December 8		at Langston	Langston, OK	W 13–2		
*Non-conference game; All times are in Central time
