= 1932 Wiley Wildcats football team =

American college football season

1932 Wiley Wildcats football

Black college national co-champion SWAC champion
- Conference: Southwestern Athletic Conference
- Record: 9–0 (5–0 SWAC)
- Head coach: Fred T. Long (10th season)

1932 Southwestern Athletic Conference football standings
	Conf.					Overall
Team	W		L		T	W		L		T
Wiley $	5	–	0	–	0	9	–	0	–	0
Langston	4	–	1	–	0	6	–	2	–	0
Prairie View	2	–	2	–	1	6	–	3	–	2
Texas College	1	–	2	–	2	?	–	?	–	?
Bishop	1	–	3	–	1	3	–	4	–	1
Samuel Huston	0	–	5	–	0	?	–	?	–	?
$ – Conference champion

The 1932 Wiley Wildcats football team was an American football team that represented Wiley College in the Southwestern Athletic Conference (SWAC) during the 1932 college football season. In their tenth season under head coach Fred T. Long, the team compiled a 9–0 record, won the SWAC championship, shut out eight of nine opponents, and outscored all opponents by a total of 278 to 8. The 1932 Wiley team was recognized as the black college national champion.

== Schedule ==
Date	Opponent	Site	Result	Attendance	Source
October 7	Houston Junior College*	Central East Texas Fair; Marshall, TX	W 36–0		
October 17	vs. Prairie View	Fair Park Stadium; Dallas, TX	W 13–0		
October 22	at Fisk*	Nashville, TN	W 5–0		
October 29	vs. Texas College	Texarkana, TX	W 10–0		
November 5	at Arkansas AM&N*	Pine Bluff, AR	W 27–0		
November 11	Langston	Marshall, TX	W 13–8		
November 19	at Rust*	Holly Springs, MS	W 54–0		
November 24	Bishop	Bishop Field; Marshall, TX	W 52–0		
December 3	vs. Samuel Huston	San Antonio, TX	W 68–0		
*Non-conference game
