= 1932 Prairie View Panthers football team =

American college football season

1932 Prairie View Panthers football

Prairie View Bowl, W 14–0 vs. Tuskegee
- Conference: Southwestern Athletic Conference
- Record: 6–3–2 (2–2–1 SWAC)
- Head coach: Sam B. Taylor (3rd season)
- Home stadium: Blackshear Field

1932 Southwestern Athletic Conference football standings
	Conf.					Overall
Team	W		L		T	W		L		T
Wiley $	5	–	0	–	0	9	–	0	–	0
Langston	4	–	1	–	0	6	–	2	–	0
Prairie View	2	–	2	–	1	6	–	3	–	2
Texas College	1	–	2	–	2	?	–	?	–	?
Bishop	1	–	3	–	1	3	–	4	–	1
Samuel Huston	0	–	5	–	0	?	–	?	–	?
$ – Conference champion

The 1932 Prairie View Panthers football team was an American football team that represented Prairie View State Normal & Industrial College (now known as Prairie View A&M University) as a member of the Southwestern Athletic Conference (SWAC) during the 1932 college football season. In their third season under head coach Sam B. Taylor, the Panthers compiled an overall record of 6–3–2, with a mark of 2–2–1 in conference play, and finished third in the SWAC.

== Schedule ==
Date	Opponent	Site	Result	Attendance	Source
October 1	Houston Junior College*	Blackshear Field; Prairie View, TX (rivalry)	W 35–0		
October 7	at Alabama State*	Cramton Bowl; Montgomery, AL	L 7–9		
October 17	vs. Wiley	State Fair Stadium; Dallas, TX (State Fair Classic)	L 0–13		
October 22	vs. Arkansas AM&N*	Kavanaugh Field; Little Rock, AR	T 0–0		
November 4	Alcorn A&M*	Blackshear Field; Prairie View, TX	W 28–0		
November 11	Bishop^{†}	Blackshear Field; Prairie View, TX	W 23–0		
November 19	Samuel Huston	Blackshear Field; Prairie View, TX	W 19–0		
November 24	at Langston	Anderson Field; Langston, OK	L 0–13		
December 2	vs. Texas College	Kyle Field; College Station, TX	T 6–6	1,500	
December 10	at Paul Quinn*	Jackson Field; Waco, TX	W 23–0		
December 30	vs. Tuskegee*	Buffalo Stadium; Houston, TX (Prairie View Bowl)	W 14–0		
*Non-conference game; ^{†}Homecoming
