= 1938 Prairie View Panthers football team =

American college football season

1938 Prairie View Panthers football

Prairie View Bowl, W 34–0 vs. Tuskegee
- Conference: Southwestern Athletic Conference
- Record: 4–2–3 (2–2–2 SWAC)
- Head coach: Sam B. Taylor (9th season)
- Home stadium: Blackshear Field

1938 Southwestern Athletic Conference football standings
	Conf.					Overall
Team	W		L		T	W		L		T
Southern +	4	–	1	–	1	7	–	1	–	1
Langston +	3	–	0	–	3	4	–	1	–	3
Prairie View	2	–	2	–	2	4	–	2	–	3
Wiley	2	–	3	–	1	5	–	3	–	2
Texas College	2	–	3	–	1	5	–	3	–	1
Arkansas AM&N	2	–	3	–	1	4	–	4	–	1
Bishop	1	–	4	–	1	4	–	5	–	1
+ – Conference co-champions

The 1938 Prairie View Panthers football team was an American football team that represented Prairie View State Normal & Industrial College (now known as Prairie View A&M University) as a member of the Southwestern Athletic Conference (SWAC) during the 1938 college football season. In their ninth season under head coach Sam B. Taylor, the Panthers compiled an overall record of 4–2–3, with a mark of 2–2–2 in conference play, and finished third in the SWAC.

== Schedule ==
Date	Opponent	Site	Result	Attendance	Source
September 24	at Samuel Huston*	Austin, TX	Canceled		
October 1	Tillotson*	Blackshear Field; Prairie View, TX	W 46–0		
October 8	Texas College	Blackshear Field; Prairie View, TX	L 7–14	3,000	
October 17	vs. Wiley	Cotton Bowl; Dallas, TX	T 6–6	10,000	
October 29	Arkansas AM&N^{†}	Blackshear Field; Prairie View, TX	W 13–6	5,000	
November 5	at Xavier (LA)*	Xavier Stadium; New Orleans, LA	T 0–0		
November 11	at Bishop	East-Central Texas Fair; Marshall, TX	W 32–19		
November 19	at Langston	Anderson Field; Langston, OK	T 0–0	7,500	
November 24	Southern	Blackshear Field; Prairie View, TX	L 12–20		
January 2	vs. Tuskegee*	Buffalo Stadium; Houston, TX (Prairie View Bowl)	W 34–0		
*Non-conference game; ^{†}Homecoming
