= 1936 Southern Jaguars football team =

American college football season

1936 Southern Jaguars football
- Conference: Southwestern Athletic Conference
- Record: 3–5–1 (1–5 SWAC)
- Head coach: Ace Mumford (1st season)
- Home stadium: University Stadium

1936 Southwestern Athletic Conference football standings
	Conf.					Overall
Team	W		L		T	W		L		T
Texas College +	4	–	1	–	1	5	–	2	–	2
Langston +	4	–	1	–	1	7	–	1	–	1
Wiley	3	–	2	–	1	6	–	3	–	1
Bishop	2	–	2	–	2	2	–	3	–	2
Arkansas AM&N	2	–	3	–	1	5	–	4	–	1
Prairie View	1	–	3	–	2	4	–	4	–	2
Southern	1	–	5	–	0	3	–	5	–	1
+ – Conference co-champions

The 1936 Southern Jaguars football team was an American football team that represented Southern University as a member of the Southwestern Athletic Conference (SWAC) during the 1936 college football season. In their first season under head coach Ace Mumford, the Jaguars compiled an overall record of 3–5–1, with a mark of 1–5 in conference play, and finished seventh in the SWAC.

The team played its home games at University Stadium in Scotlandville, Louisiana (which has since been annexed into the Baton Rouge city limits).

== Schedule ==
Date	Opponent	Site	Result	Attendance	Source
October 3	at Alcorn A&M*	Henderson Stadium; Lorman, MS	T 0–0		
October 10	Bishop	University Stadium; Scotlandville, LA	W 20–6		
October 17	Arkansas AM&N	University Stadium; Scotlandville, LA	L 6–16		
October 24	Wiley	University Stadium; Scotlandville, LA	L 0–18		
October 31	at Louisiana Normal*	Tiger Field; Grambling, LA (rivalry)	W 34–0		
November 14	at Texas College	Lion Stadium; Tyler, TX	L 0–3	1,500	
November 21	vs. Jarvis*	Brown Field; Monroe, LA	W 74–7		
November 26	at Prairie View	Prairie View, TX	L 0–13		
December 5	vs. Langston	Page Stadium; Oklahoma City, OK	L 7–12	3,000	
*Non-conference game
