= 1936 Texas College Steers football team =

American college football season

1936 Texas College Steers football

SWAC co-champion
- Conference: Southwestern Athletic Conference
- Record: 5–2–2 (4–1–1 SWAC)
- Head coach: Eolus Von Rettig (1st season)
- Home stadium: Lion Stadium

1936 Southwestern Athletic Conference football standings
| | Conf. | | | | | Overall |
| Team | W | | L | | T | W | | L | | T |
|---|---|---|---|---|---|---|---|---|---|---|
| Texas College + | 4 | – | 1 | – | 1 | 5 | – | 2 | – | 2 |
| Langston + | 4 | – | 1 | – | 1 | 7 | – | 1 | – | 1 |
| Wiley | 3 | – | 2 | – | 1 | 6 | – | 3 | – | 1 |
| Bishop | 2 | – | 2 | – | 2 | 2 | – | 3 | – | 2 |
| Arkansas AM&N | 2 | – | 3 | – | 1 | 5 | – | 4 | – | 1 |
| Prairie View | 1 | – | 3 | – | 2 | 4 | – | 4 | – | 2 |
| Southern | 1 | – | 5 | – | 0 | 3 | – | 5 | – | 1 |
+ – Conference co-champions

The 1936 Texas College Steers football team was an American football team that represented Texas College as a member of the Southwestern Athletic Conference (SWAC) during the 1936 college football season. Led by first-year head coach Eolus Von Rettig, the Steers compiled an overall record of 5–2–2, with a conference mark of 4–1–1 and finished as SWAC co-champion.

== Schedule ==
| Date | Opponent | Site | Result | Attendance | Source |
|---|---|---|---|---|---|
| October 3 | at Prairie View | Prairie View, TX | T 0–0 | | |
| October 9 | vs. Alabama State* | Legion Field; Birmingham, AL | T 6–6 | | |
| October 17 | Jarvis* | Lion Stadium; Tyler, TX | W 32–0 | | |
| October 24 | at Xavier (LA)* | Xavier Stadium; New Orleans, LA | L 6–12 | 5,000 | |
| October 31 | at Langston | Langston, OK | L 6–13 | 3,000 | |
| November 7 | at Arkansas AM&N | Pine Bluff, AR | W 2–0 | | |
| November 14 | Southern^{†} | Lion Stadium; Tyler, TX | W 3–0 | | |
| November 21 | at Bishop | Fair Park; Marshall, TX | W 14–7 | | |
| November 26 | at Wiley | Fair Park; Marshall, TX | W 8–7 | | |
*Non-conference game; ^{†}Homecoming
