= 1931 Florida A&M Rattlers football team =

American college football season

1931 Florida A&M Rattlers football
- Conference: Southern Intercollegiate Athletic Conference
- Record: 2–4–1 (0–2 SIAC)
- Head coach: Ted A. Wright (1st season)

1931 Southern Intercollegiate Athletic Conference football standings
	Conf.					Overall
Team	W		L		T	W		L		T
Tuskegee $	6	–	1	–	0	10	–	2	–	0
Clark (GA)	5	–	1	–	0	9	–	1	–	0
Alabama State	4	–	1	–	0	8	–	3	–	0
Knoxville	3	–	2	–	0	4	–	3	–	1
Morris Brown	3	–	4	–	0	6	–	4	–	0
Fisk	1	–	2	–	0	2	–	6	–	0
Talladega	1	–	3	–	0	3	–	4	–	0
Morehouse	1	–	5	–	0	2	–	6	–	1
Edward Waters	0	–	1	–	0	6	–	2	–	1
Lane	0	–	1	–	0	3	–	3	–	0
Miles	0	–	1	–	0	?	–	?	–	?
Florida A&M	0	–	2	–	0	2	–	4	–	1
$ – Conference champion

The 1931 Florida A&M Rattlers football team represented represented Florida Agricultural and Mechanical College for Negroes (FAMC)—now known as Florida A&M University—as a member of the Southern Intercollegiate Athletic Conference (SIAC) during the 1931 college football season. Led by first-year head coach Ted A. Wright, the Rattlers compiled an overall record of 2–4–1 with a mark of 0–2 in conference play.

== Schedule ==
Date	Time	Opponent	Site	Result	Attendance	Source
October 3	2:00 p.m.	at 24th Infantry, Fort Benning*	Doughboy Stadium; Fort Benning, GA	T 6–6		
October 16		Claflin*	Tallahassee, FL	W 32–0		
October 23		Bethune–Cookman*	Tallahassee, FL	W 33–2		
October 30	12:00 p.m.	at South Carolina State*	Orangeburg County Fair grounds; Orangeburg, SC	L 0–31	3,000	
November 11	2:30 p.m.	vs. Alabama State	Memorial Stadium; Columbus, GA	L 0–14		
November 20		at Morris Brown	Spiller Field; Atlanta, GA	L 0–6		
December 4	3:00 p.m.	Edward Waters*^{†}	Tallahassee, FL	L 0–2		
*Non-conference game; ^{†}Homecoming; All times are in Eastern time
