= 1933 Tuskegee Golden Tigers football team =

American college football season

1933 Tuskegee Golden Tigers football

SIAC champion
- Conference: Southern Intercollegiate Athletic Conference
- Record: 8–1–2 (6–0–1 SIAC)
- Head coach: Cleve Abbott (11th season)
- Home stadium: Alumni Bowl

The 1933 Tuskegee Golden Tigers football team represented the Tuskegee Normal and Industrial Institute—now known as Tuskegee University—as a member of the Southern Intercollegiate Athletic Conference (SIAC) during the 1933 college football season. Led by 11th-year head coach Cleve Abbott, the Golden Tigers compiled an overall record of 9–1–2 with a mark of 6–0–1 in conference play, winning the SIAC title. Tuskegee played home games at the Alumni Bowl in Tuskegee, Alabama.

== Schedule ==
Date	Time	Opponent	Site	Result	Attendance	Source
September 30		at West Virginia State*	Charleston, WV	cancelled		
October 6	2:30 p.m.	LeMoyne	Alumni Bowl; Tuskegee, AL	W 13–0	3,000	
October 13	3:45 p.m.	vs. Morris Brown	Legion Field; Birmingham, AL	T 0–0		
October 21	2:00 p.m.	vs. Wilberforce*	Soldier Field; Chicago, IL	T 0–0	2,000–3,000	
October 27	2:45 p.m.	Knoxville	Knoxville College field; Knoxville, TN	W 37–6		
November 4	2:00 p.m.	Morehouse	Alumni Bowl; Tuskegee, AL	W 26–6		
November 11	1:00 p.m.	at Clark (GA)	Ponce de Leon Park; Atlanta, GA	W 13–0		
November 18		South Carolina State	Alumni Bowl; Tuskegee, AL	W 15–0	3,500	
November 25		Fisk^{†}	Alumni Bowl; Tuskegee, AL	W 27–0		
November 30	2:00 p.m.	at Alabama State	Cramton Bowl; Montgomery, AL	W 14–7	7,000	
December 2		at Xavier (LA)*	Xavier Stadium; New Orleans LA	W 51–7		
December 9	2:00 p.m.	at Wiley*	Fair Park; Marshall, TX	L 13–0	4,000	
*Non-conference game; ^{†}Homecoming; All times are in Central time
