= 1944 Wiley Wildcats football team =

American college football season

1944 Wiley Wildcats football

SWAC co-champion

Prairie View Bowl, W 26–0 vs. Prairie View
- Conference: Southwestern Athletic Conference
- Record: 8–1 (5–1 SWAC)
- Head coach: Fred T. Long (22nd season)
- Home stadium: Wiley Field

1944 Southwestern Athletic Conference football standings
	Conf.					Overall
Team	W		L		T	W		L		T
Texas College +	5	–	1	–	0	8	–	1	–	0
Wiley +	5	–	1	–	0	8	–	1	–	0
Langston +	5	–	1	–	0	6	–	2	–	1
Southern	2	–	4	–	0	4	–	4	–	0
Samuel Huston	2	–	4	–	0	3	–	5	–	0
Prairie View	2	–	4	–	0	3	–	6	–	0
Arkansas AM&N	0	–	6	–	0	1	–	7	–	0
+ – Conference co-champions

The 1944 Wiley Wildcats football team represented Wiley College as a member of the Southwestern Athletic Conference (SWAC) during the 1944 college football season. Led by 22nd-year head coach Fred T. Long, the Wildcats compiled an overall record of 8–1, with a conference record of 5–1, and finished as SWAC co-champion.

== Schedule ==
Date	Opponent	Site	Result	Attendance	Source
October 7	Arkansas AM&N	Wiley Field; Marshall, TX	W 45–0		
October 16	vs. Prairie View	Cotton Bowl; Dallas, TX	W 28–0	14,000	
October 21	Samuel Huston	Wiley Field; Marshall, TX	W 17–0		
October 30	vs. Xavier (LA)*	State Fair Stadium; Shreveport, LA	W 55–0	4,000	
November 11	at Langston	Anderson Field; Langston, OK	L 6–9		
November 18	at Southern	University Stadium; Baton Rouge, LA	W 45–6	3,000	
November 30	at Texas College	Steer Stadium; Tyler, TX	W 16–12		
December 9	Tuskegee*^{†}	Wiley Field; Marshall, TX	W 24–0		
January 1	vs. Prairie View*	Buffalo Stadium; Houston, TX (Prairie View Bowl)	W 26–0	7,000	
*Non-conference game; ^{†}Homecoming
