= 1938 Langston Lions football team =

American college football season

1938 Langston Lions football

SWAC co-champion
- Conference: Southwestern Athletic Conference
- Record: 4–1–3 (3–0–3 SWAC)
- Head coach: Caesar Felton Gayles (9th season)
- Home stadium: Anderson Field

1938 Southwestern Athletic Conference football standings
	Conf.					Overall
Team	W		L		T	W		L		T
Southern +	4	–	1	–	1	7	–	1	–	1
Langston +	3	–	0	–	3	4	–	1	–	3
Prairie View	2	–	2	–	2	4	–	2	–	3
Wiley	2	–	3	–	1	5	–	3	–	2
Texas College	2	–	3	–	1	5	–	3	–	1
Arkansas AM&N	2	–	3	–	1	4	–	4	–	1
Bishop	1	–	4	–	1	4	–	5	–	1
+ – Conference co-champions

The 1938 Langston Lions football team represented Langston University, in Oklahoma, United States, as a member of the Southwestern Athletic Conference (SWAC) during the 1938 college football season. Led by ninth-year head coach Caesar Felton Gayles, the Lions compiled an overall record of 4–1–3, with a conference record of 3–0–3, and finished as SWAC co-champion.

== Schedule ==
Date	Opponent	Site	Result	Attendance	Source
October 8	Morehouse*	Anderson Field; Langston, OK	W 18–0	3,000	
October 15	Southern	Anderson Field; Langston, OK	T 6–6		
October 22	vs. Bishop	Page Stadium; Oklahoma City, OK	W 20–0		
October 29	Texas College	Anderson Field; Langston, OK	W 17–0		
November 12	at Wiley	Recreational Center; Marshall, TX	W 5–0		
November 19	Prairie View^{†}	Anderson Field; Langston, OK	T 0–0	7,500	
November 24	at Xavier (LA)*	Xavier Stadium; New Orleans, LA	L 0–7		
December 3	at Arkansas AM&N	Athletic Field; Pine Bluff, AR	T 0–0		
*Non-conference game; ^{†}Homecoming
