= 1935 Prairie View Panthers football team =

American college football season

1935 Prairie View Panthers football

Prairie View Bowl, L 6–7 vs. Wiley
- Conference: Southwestern Athletic Conference
- Record: 4–3–4 (1–1–4 SWAC)
- Head coach: Sam B. Taylor (6th season)
- Home stadium: Blackshear Field

1935 Southwestern Athletic Conference football standings
	Conf.					Overall
Team	W		L		T	W		L		T
Texas College $	5	–	0	–	1	9	–	0	–	1
Wiley	3	–	0	–	3	8	–	0	–	3
Bishop	3	–	2	–	1	7	–	2	–	1
Prairie View	1	–	1	–	4	4	–	3	–	4
Langston	1	–	3	–	2	2	–	3	–	2
Southern	1	–	4	–	1	1	–	7	–	1
Samuel Huston	1	–	5	–	0	1	–	6	–	0
$ – Conference champion

The 1935 Prairie View Panthers football team was an American football team that represented Prairie View State Normal & Industrial College (now known as Prairie View A&M University) as a member of the Southwestern Athletic Conference (SWAC) during the 1935 college football season. In their sixth season under head coach Sam B. Taylor, the Panthers compiled an overall record of 4–3–4, with a mark of 1–1–4 in conference play, and finished fourth in the SWAC.

== Schedule ==
Date	Opponent	Site	Result	Attendance	Source
October 5	Paul Quinn*	Blackshear Field; Prairie View, TX	W 53–0		
October 21	vs. Wiley	State Fair Stadium; Dallas, TX	T 0–0	3,000	
October 25	Arkansas AM&N*	Blackshear Field; Prairie View, TX	W 19–0		
November 2	at Texas College	Lion Stadium; Tyler, TX	L 0–7		
November 11	Bishop^{†}	Blackshear Field; Prairie View, TX	T 0–0	1,500	
November 23	Langston	Blackshear Field; Prairie View, TX	T 0–0		
November 28	at Southern	University Stadium; Scotlandville, LA	T 6–6		
December 7	vs. Samuel Huston	School Park; Galveston, TX	W 20–0		
December 14	at Xavier (LA)*	Xavier Stadium; New Orleans, LA	W 7–0		
December 21	at Tuskegee*	Alumni Bowl; Tuskegee, AL	L 6–7		
January 1	vs. Wiley*	Buffalo Stadium; Houston, TX (Prairie View Bowl)	L 6–7	2,500	
*Non-conference game; ^{†}Homecoming
