= 1933 Florida A&M Rattlers football team =

American college football season

1933 Florida A&M Rattlers football

Orange Blossom Classic, W 9–6 vs. Howard
- Conference: Southern Intercollegiate Athletic Conference
- Record: 5–3 (3–3 SIAC)
- Head coach: Ted A. Wright (3rd season)

The 1933 Florida A&M Rattlers football team represented Florida A&M University as a member of the Southern Intercollegiate Athletic Conference (SIAC) during the 1933 college football season. Led by Ted A. Wright in his third and final season as head coach, the Rattlers finished with an overall record of 5–3 and a mark of 3–3 in conference play. Florida A&M defeated Howard in the Orange Blossom Classic.

== Schedule ==
Date	Opponent	Site	Result	Attendance	Source
October 7	Morehouse	Tallahassee, FL	W 13–7		
October 14	Claflin*	Tallahassee, FL	W 43–0		
October 26	at Alabama State	Cramton Bowl; Montgomery, AL	L 6–32		
November 3	at South Carolina State	Orangeburg, SC	L 0–26		
November 17	Benedict	Tallahassee, FL	W 26–0		
November 25	at Morris Brown	Ponce de Leon Park; Atlanta, GA	L 0–27		
November 30	Edward Waters^{†}	Tallahassee, FL	W 6–0		
December 2	vs. Howard*	Durkee Field; Jacksonville, FL (Orange Blossom Classic)	W 9–6	6,000	
*Non-conference game; ^{†}Homecoming
