= 1933 Wiley Wildcats football team =

American college football season

1933 Wiley Wildcats football

SWAC co-champion
- Conference: Southwestern Athletic Conference
- Record: 9–2 (4–1 SWAC)
- Head coach: Fred T. Long (11th season)
- Home stadium: Fair Park, Wiley Field

1933 Southwestern Athletic Conference football standings
	Conf.					Overall
Team	W		L		T	W		L		T
Langston +	4	–	1	–	0	9	–	1	–	0
Prairie View +	4	–	1	–	0	7	–	1	–	0
Wiley +	4	–	1	–	0	9	–	2	–	0
Texas College	1	–	3	–	1	4	–	3	–	1
Bishop	1	–	3	–	1	1	–	6	–	1
Samuel Huston	0	–	5	–	0	2	–	6	–	0
+ – Conference co-champions

The 1933 Wiley Wildcats football team represented Wiley College as a member of the Southwestern Athletic Conference (SWAC) during the 1933 college football season. Led by 11th-year head coach Fred T. Long, the Wildcats compiled an overall record of 9–2, with a conference record of 4–1, and finished as SWAC co-champion.

== Schedule ==
Date	Opponent	Site	Result	Attendance	Source
September 22	Jarvis*	Fair Park; Marshall, TX	W 18–0		
October 7	Samuel Huston	Wiley Field; Marshall, TX	W 45–0		
October 16	vs. Prairie View	Fair Park Stadium; Dallas, TX	W 6–0	7,000	
October 21	Texas College	Wiley Field; Marshall, TX	W 3–0		
October 28	vs. Kentucky State*	Central Stadium; Louisville, KY	W 13–12		
November 4	at Morris Brown*	Ponce de Leon Park; Atlanta, GA	L 7–12	8,000	
November 11	Bishop	Wiley Field; Marshall, TX	W 32–0		
November 18	at Langston	Anderson Field; Langston, OK	L 6–10	2,500	
November 25	at Paul Quinn*	Jackson Field; Waco, TX	W 44–0		
November 30	Arkansas AM&N*	Wiley Field; Marshall, TX	W 18–6		
December 9	Tuskegee*^{†}	Fair Park; Marshall, TX	W 13–0	4,000	
*Non-conference game; ^{†}Homecoming
