= 1939 Prairie View Panthers football team =

American college football season

1939 Prairie View Panthers football

Prairie View Bowl, W 7–6 vs. Xavier (LA)
- Conference: Southwestern Athletic Conference
- Record: 5–2–1 (3–2–1 SWAC)
- Head coach: Sam B. Taylor (10th season)
- Home stadium: Blackshear Field

1939 Southwestern Athletic Conference football standings
	Conf.					Overall
Team	W		L		T	W		L		T
Langston $	5	–	0	–	1	7	–	0	–	1
Prairie View	3	–	2	–	1	5	–	2	–	1
Arkansas AM&N	3	–	2	–	1	6	–	3	–	1
Bishop	2	–	2	–	2	3	–	2	–	2
Wiley	3	–	3	–	0	6	–	5	–	0
Southern	1	–	4	–	1	4	–	5	–	1
Texas College	1	–	5	–	0	1	–	6	–	1
$ – Conference champion

The 1939 Prairie View Panthers football team was an American football team that represented Prairie View State Normal & Industrial College (now known as Prairie View A&M University) as a member of the Southwestern Athletic Conference (SWAC) during the 1939 college football season. In their 10th season under head coach Sam B. Taylor, the Panthers compiled an overall record of 5–2–1, with a mark of 3–2–1 in conference play, and finished tied for second in the SWAC.

== Schedule ==
Date	Opponent	Site	Result	Attendance	Source
October 7	at Texas College	Lion Stadium; Tyler, TX	L 14–18		
October 16	vs. Wiley	Cotton Bowl; Dallas, TX	L 6–13		
October 21	at Tillotson*	Austin, TX	W 32–0		
October 28	at Arkansas AM&N	Athletic Field; Pine Bluff, AR	W 22–0		
November 11	Bishop	Blackshear Field; Prairie View, TX	W 13–0		
November 25	Langston	Blackshear Field; Prairie View, TX	T 7–7		
November 30	at Southern	University Stadium; Scotlandville, LA	W 13–0	2,500	
January 1	vs. Xavier (LA)*	Buffalo Stadium; Houston, TX (Prairie View Bowl)	W 7–6	4,000	
*Non-conference game
