= 1938 Wiley Wildcats football team =

American college football season

1938 Wiley Wildcats football
- Conference: Southwestern Athletic Conference
- Record: 5–3–2 (2–3–1 SWAC)
- Head coach: Fred T. Long (16th season)
- Home stadium: Fair Park Stadium

1938 Southwestern Athletic Conference football standings
	Conf.					Overall
Team	W		L		T	W		L		T
Southern +	4	–	1	–	1	7	–	1	–	1
Langston +	3	–	0	–	3	4	–	1	–	3
Prairie View	2	–	2	–	2	4	–	2	–	3
Wiley	2	–	3	–	1	5	–	3	–	2
Texas College	2	–	3	–	1	5	–	3	–	1
Arkansas AM&N	2	–	3	–	1	4	–	4	–	1
Bishop	1	–	4	–	1	4	–	5	–	1
+ – Conference co-champions

The 1938 Wiley Wildcats football team represented Wiley College as a member of the Southwestern Athletic Conference (SWAC) during the 1938 college football season. Led by 16th-year head coach Fred T. Long, the Wildcats compiled an overall record of 5–3–2, with a conference record of 2–3–1, and finished tied for fourth in the SWAC.

== Schedule ==
Date	Time	Opponent	Site	Result	Attendance	Source
September 23		Tillotson*	Fair Park Stadium; Marshall, TX	W 67–6		
September 30		Bishop	Fair Park Stadium; Marshall, TX	L 0–12		
October 8		Arkansas AM&N	Fair Park Stadium; Marshall, TX	W 19–0		
October 17		vs. Prairie View	Cotton Bowl; Dallas, TX (State Fair Classic (TX))	T 6–6	10,000	
October 22	3:00 p.m.	at Samuel Huston*	Sam Huston Stadium; Austin, TX	W 14–2		
October 31		vs. Southern	State Fair Stadium; Shreveport, LA (State Fair Classic (LA))	W 14–12		
November 5		Philander Smith*	Fair Park Stadium; Marshall, TX	W 21–0	500	
November 12		Langston	Fair Park Stadium; Marshall, TX	L 0–5		
November 19	8:00 p.m.	at Xavier (LA)*	Pelican Stadium; New Orleans, LA	T 7–7		
November 24		at Texas College	Lion Stadium; Tyler, TX	L 2–7		
*Non-conference game; All times are in Central time
