= Caesar Felton Gayles =

American football and basketball coach (1900–1986)

Biographical details
- Born: May 22, 1900; Mississippi, U.S.
- Died: November 5, 1986 (aged 86); Muskogee, Oklahoma, U.S.

Playing career

Football
- 1920–1924: Morehouse
- Position: End

Coaching career (HC unless noted)

Football
- 1927: Tennessee State
- 1928–1929: Arkansas AM&N
- 1930–1957: Langston

Basketball
- 1927–1928: Tennessee State
- 1930–1965: Langston

Administrative career (AD unless noted)
- 1928–1930: Arkansas AM&N

Head coaching record
- Overall: 145–100–24 (football); 571–281 (basketball, Langston only)
- Bowls: 2–1

Accomplishments and honors

Championships
- Football; 2 black college national (1939, 1941); 7 SWAC (1933, 1936, 1938–1940, 1944, 1949)
- College Basketball Hall of Fame; Inducted in 2015

Caesar Felton "Zip" Gayles (May 22, 1900 – November 5, 1986) was an American college football and college basketball coach. He served as the head football coach at Tennessee Agricultural & Industrial State College—later known as Tennessee State University—in 1927, Arkansas Agricultural, Mechanical & Normal College—later University of Arkansas at Pine Bluff–from 1928 to 1929, and at Langston University from 1930 to 1957. He was also the head basketball coach at Langston from 1930 to 1965, tallying a mark of 571–281. Gayles was inducted into the Oklahoma Athletic Hall of Fame in 1974, the NAIA Basketball Coaches Hall of Fame in 1986, and the National Collegiate Basketball Hall of Fame in 2015.

== Coaching career ==
=== Tennessee A&I ===
After graduating, Gayles took a faculty and coaching position at Tennessee Agricultural & Industrial State College in Nashville, Tennessee, now called Tennessee State University. As the fourth head coach of the football, he led the squad to a record of 1–2–3 in 1927.

Some records list his name as "Felton Gale" at this time but other records confirm that "Felton Gale" and "Caesar Felton Gayles" are indeed the same person.

=== Arkansas–Pine Bluff ===
Gayles was the head football coach at Arkansas Agricultural, Mechanical & Normal College—now known as the University of Arkansas at Pine Bluff—for two seasons, from 1928 to 1929, compiling a record of 8–9–3.

=== Langston ===
Gayles coached for 35 years at Langston University in Langston, Oklahoma. As the basketball coach from 1930 to 1965, his teams compiled a record of 571–281. He also was the football coach for 28 seasons, from 1930 to 1957, finishing with a record of 146–78–18. His teams were National Negro champions twice in both basketball and football.

== Death ==
Gayles died on November 5, 1986, in Muskogee, Oklahoma.

== Head coaching record ==
=== Football ===
Year	Team	Overall	Conference	Standing	Bowl/playoffs
Tennessee State Tigers (Southern Intercollegiate Athletic Conference) (1927)
1927	Tennessee State	1–2–3	1–1–2	5th	
Tennessee State:		1–2–3	1–1–2		
Arkansas AM&N Lions (Independent) (1928–1929)
1928	Arkansas AM&N	2–7			
1929	Arkansas AM&N	6–2–3			
Arkansas AM&N:		8–9–3			
Langston Lions (Independent) (1930–1931)
1930	Langston	5–1			
1931	Langston	3–3–1			
Langston Lions (Southwestern Athletic Conference) (1932–1957)
1932	Langston	6–2	4–1	2nd	
1933	Langston	9–1	4–1	T–1st	L Prairie View
1934	Langston	7–2	3–1	2nd	
1935	Langston	2–3–2	1–3–2	5th	
1936	Langston	7–1–1	4–1–1	T–1st	
1937	Langston	3–4–1	3–3	4th	
1938	Langston	4–1–3	3–0–3	T–1st	
1939	Langston	7–0–1	5–0–1	1st	
1940	Langston	6–3	5–1	T–1st	
1941	Langston	9–1–1	4–1–1	2nd	W Vulcan
1942	Langston	6–2–1	1–2–1	3rd	W Prairie View
1943	Langston	2–4			
1944	Langston	6–2–1	5–1	T–1st	
1945	Langston	5–3	3–3	4th	
1946	Langston	2–6–1	2–4	6th	
1947	Langston	2–7–1	2–4–1	6th	
1948	Langston	7–3	5–2	T–2nd	
1949	Langston	8–1–1	6–0–1	T–1st	
1950	Langston	9–1	6–1	2nd	
1951	Langston	4–5	4–3	5th	
1952	Langston	2–6–1	1–4–1	6th	
1953	Langston	3–6	2–4	5th	
1954	Langston	4–4–1	4–2	3rd	
1955	Langston	6–1–2	4–1–2	4th	
1956	Langston	2–7	2–4	5th	
1957	Langston	0–9	0–6	7th	
Langston:		136–89–19	83–53–14		
Total:		145–100–24			
National championship Conference title Conference division title or championship game berth
