= 1931 Prairie View Panthers football team =

American college football season

1931 Prairie View Panthers football

SWAC champion

Prairie View Bowl, W 27–2 vs. Alabama State
- Conference: Southwestern Athletic Conference
- Record: 9–1 (4–0 SWAC)
- Head coach: Sam B. Taylor (2nd season)
- Home stadium: Blackshear Field

1931 Southwestern Athletic Conference football standings
	Conf.					Overall
Team	W		L		T	W		L		T
Prairie View $	4	–	0	–	0	9	–	1	–	1
Wiley	3	–	1	–	0	6	–	3	–	1
Bishop	2	–	2	–	0	?	–	?	–	?
Samuel Huston	0	–	3	–	1	?	–	?	–	?
Texas College	0	–	3	–	1	?	–	?	–	?
$ – Conference champion

The 1931 Prairie View Panthers football team represented Prairie View Normal and Industrial College (now known as Prairie View A&M University) as a member of the Southwestern Athletic Conference (SWAC) during the 1931 college football season. Led by second-year head coach Sam B. Taylor, the Panthers compiled an overall record of 9–1, with a conference record of 4–0, finished as SWAC champion, and with a victory over Alabama State in the Prairie View Bowl.

== Schedule ==
Date	Time	Opponent	Site	Result	Attendance	Source
October 3		Houston Junior College*	Blackshear Field; Prairie View, TX	W 32–0		
October 10		Langston*	Blackshear Field; Prairie View, TX	W 6–0		
October 19		vs. Wiley	Fair Park Stadium; Dallas, TX	W 20–0		
October 23		vs. Arkansas AM&N*	Kyle Field; College Station, TX	W 26–6	3,000	
October 31		at Alcorn A&M*	Henderson Stadium; Lorman, MS	W 39–0		
November 12		Texas College	Blackshear Field; Prairie View, TX	W 47–0		
November 14		at Bishop	Marshall, TX	W 26–0		
November 26	2:00 p.m.	at Tuskegee*	Alumni Bowl; Tuskegee, AL	L 0–21		
December 12		at Samuel Huston	Samuel Huston Field; Austin, TX	W 25–0		
January 1		vs. Alabama State*	Buffalo Stadium; Houston, TX (Prairie View Bowl)	W 27–2	4,000	
*Non-conference game; All times are in Central time
