= 1944 Southern Jaguars football team =

American college football season

1944 Southern Jaguars football
- Conference: Southwestern Athletic Conference
- Record: 4–4 (2–4 SWAC)
- Head coach: Ace Mumford (9th season)
- Home stadium: University Stadium

1944 Southwestern Athletic Conference football standings
	Conf.					Overall
Team	W		L		T	W		L		T
Texas College +	5	–	1	–	0	8	–	1	–	0
Wiley +	5	–	1	–	0	8	–	1	–	0
Langston +	5	–	1	–	0	6	–	2	–	1
Southern	2	–	4	–	0	4	–	4	–	0
Samuel Huston	2	–	4	–	0	3	–	5	–	0
Prairie View	2	–	4	–	0	3	–	6	–	0
Arkansas AM&N	0	–	6	–	0	1	–	7	–	0
+ – Conference co-champions

The 1944 Southern Jaguars football team was an American football team that represented Southern University as a member of the Southwestern Athletic Conference (SWAC) during the 1944 college football season. In their ninth season under head coach Ace Mumford, the Jaguars compiled an overall record of 4–4, with a mark of 2–4 in conference play, and finished tied for fourth in the SWAC.

The team played its home games at University Stadium in Scotlandville, Louisiana (which has since been annexed into the Baton Rouge city limits).

== Schedule ==
Date	Opponent	Site	Result	Attendance	Source
October 14	Samuel Huston	University Stadium; Scotlandville, LA	W 19–0	2,000	
October 21	at Arkansas AM&N	Athletic Field; Pine Bluff, AR	W 19–13		
October 28	Langston	University Stadium; Scotlandville, LA	L Forfeit		
November 4	at Texas College	Steer Stadium; Tyler, TX	L 20–28		
November 11	Selman Field*	University Stadium; Scotlandville, LA	W 47–0		
November 18	Wiley	University Stadium; Scotlandville, LA	L 6–45	3,000	
December 2	Prairie View	University Stadium; Scotlandville, LA	L 0–6		
December 9	at Xavier (LA)*	Xavier Stadium; New Orleans, LA	W 19–0	3,000	
*Non-conference game
