= 1943 Wiley Wildcats football team =

American college football season

1943 Wiley Wildcats football

Prairie View Bowl, L 0–6 vs. Prairie View
- Conference: Southwestern Athletic Conference
- Record: 3–1–2 ( SWAC)
- Head coach: Fred T. Long (21st season)
- Home stadium: Wiley Field

1943 Southwestern Athletic Conference football standings
	Conf.			Overall
Team	W	L	T	W	L	T
No champion

The 1943 Wiley Wildcats football team represented Wiley College as a member of the Southwestern Athletic Conference (SWAC) during the 1943 college football season. Led by 21st-year head coach Fred T. Long, the Wildcats compiled an overall record of 3–1–2.

== Schedule ==
Date	Opponent	Site	Result	Attendance	Source
October 16	vs. Prairie View	Cotton Bowl; Dallas, TX	T 0–0	10,000	
October 23	vs. Samuel Huston	Katy Park; Waco, TX	W 12–0		
November 1	vs. Xavier (LA)*	State Fair Stadium; Shreveport, LA	W 73–0	4,000	
November 13	Langston^{†}	Wiley Field; Marshall, TX	W 31–12		
November 25	Texas College	Wiley Field; Marshall, TX	T 0–0	2,500	
January 1	vs. Prairie View*	Buffalo Stadium; Houston, TX (Prairie View Bowl)	L 0–6		
*Non-conference game; ^{†}Homecoming
