= 1936 Langston Lions football team =

American college football season

1936 Langston Lions football

SWAC co-champion
- Conference: Southwestern Athletic Conference
- Record: 7–1–1 (4–1–1 SWAC)
- Head coach: Caesar Felton Gayles (7th season)
- Home stadium: Anderson Field

1936 Southwestern Athletic Conference football standings
	Conf.					Overall
Team	W		L		T	W		L		T
Texas College +	4	–	1	–	1	5	–	2	–	2
Langston +	4	–	1	–	1	7	–	1	–	1
Wiley	3	–	2	–	1	6	–	3	–	1
Bishop	2	–	2	–	2	2	–	3	–	2
Arkansas AM&N	2	–	3	–	1	5	–	4	–	1
Prairie View	1	–	3	–	2	4	–	4	–	2
Southern	1	–	5	–	0	3	–	5	–	1
+ – Conference co-champions

The 1936 Langston Lions football team represented Oklahoma Colored Agricultural and Normal University (now known as Langston University) as a member of the Southwestern Athletic Conference (SWAC) during the 1936 college football season. Led by seventh-year head coach Caesar Felton Gayles, the Lions compiled an overall record of 7–1–1, with a conference record of 4–1–1, and finished as SWAC co-champion.

== Schedule ==
Date	Opponent	Site	Result	Attendance	Source
September 26	Kansas City Chauffeurs Club*	Anderson Field; Langston, OK	W 20–0		
October 3	at Wiley	Central East Texas Fair; Marshall, TX	W 3–0	4,000	
October 17	vs. Bishop	Jelsma Stadium; Guthrie, OK	T 7–7	3,000	
October 31	Texas College	Anderson Field; Langston, OK	W 13–6	3,000	
November 7	vs. Lincoln (MO)*	Sumner High Field; Kansas City, KS	W 20–6		
November 14	at Arkansas AM&N	Athletic Field; Pine Bluff, AR	L 0–2		
November 21	Prairie View^{†}	Anderson Field; Langston, OK	W 3–0	5,000	
November 26	at Xavier (LA)*	Xavier Stadium; New Orleans, LA	W 3–0	5,000	
December 5	vs. Southern	Page Stadium; Oklahoma City, OK	W 12–7	3,000	
*Non-conference game; ^{†}Homecoming
