= 1930 Tuskegee Golden Tigers football team =

American college football season

1930 Tuskegee Golden Tigers football

Black college national co-champion SIAC champion

Prairie View Bowl, W 19–7 vs. Prairie View
- Conference: Southern Intercollegiate Athletic Conference
- Record: 11–0–1 (7–0 SIAC)
- Head coach: Cleve Abbott (8th season)
- Home stadium: Alumni Bowl

1930 Southern Intercollegiate Athletic Conference football standings
	Conf.					Overall
Team	W		L		T	W		L		T
Tuskegee $	7	–	0	–	0	10	–	0	–	1
Fisk	2	–	0	–	0	10	–	1	–	0
Morehouse	6	–	1	–	0	9	–	2	–	0
Morris Brown	4	–	2	–	1	6	–	3	–	1
Edward Waters	2	–	1	–	0	7	–	1	–	1
Alabama State	3	–	3	–	0	6	–	5	–	0
Knoxville	1	–	2	–	0	?	–	?	–	?
Talladega	1	–	4	–	0	1	–	6	–	0
Clark (GA)	0	–	3	–	1	?	–	?	–	?
Florida A&M	0	–	3	–	0	2	–	4	–	0
Lane	0	–	3	–	0	?	–	?	–	?
Miles	0	–	4	–	0	2	–	5	–	0
$ – Conference champion

The 1930 Tuskegee Golden Tigers football team represented the Tuskegee Normal and Industrial Institute—now known as Tuskegee University—as a member of the Southern Intercollegiate Athletic Conference (SIAC) during the 1930 college football season. In their eighth season under head coach Cleve Abbott, Tuskegee compiled an overall record of 11–0–1 with a mark of 7–0 in conferenc eplay, won the SIAC championship, shut out five of 12 opponents, defeated Prairie View A&M in the Prairie View Bowl, and outscored all opponents by a total of 338 to 44. The team was recognized as the black college national champion.

Key players included Benjamin F. Stevenson and fullback Shorty Shanklin.

== Schedule ==
Date	Opponent	Site	Result	Attendance	Source
September 20	at 24th Infantry, Fort Benning*	Doughboy Stadium; Columbus, GA	W 42–0	5,000	
October 4	Lane	Alumni Bowl; Tuskegee, AL	W 41–6		
October 11	Wiley*^{†}	Alumni Bowl; Tuskegee, AL	W 26–0		
October 17	vs. Talladega	Legion Field; Birmingham, AL	W 40–6		
October 25	vs. Wilberforce*	Soldier Field; Chicago, IL	T 0–0	25,000	
November 1	Knoxville	Alumni Bowl; Tuskegee, AL	W 31–6		
November 8	at Morehouse	Athletic Field; Atlanta, GA	W 19–6		
November 15	Clark (GA)	Alumni Bowl; Tuskegee, AL	W 19–7		
November 22	at Alabama State	Cramton Bowl; Montgomery, AL (rivalry)	W 32–6		
November 27	Alcorn A&M*	Alumni Bowl; Tuskegee, AL	W 57–0		
December 5	at Morris Brown	Spiller Field; Atlanta, GA	W 12–0		
January 1, 1931	vs. Prairie View*	Buffalo Stadium; Houston, TX (Prairie View Bowl)	W 19–7		
*Non-conference game; ^{†}Homecoming
