= Jessie Abbott =

American sports coach (1897–1982)

Jessie Harriett Scott Abbott (March 23, 1897 – August 8, 1982) was an American sports coach. A member of the Tuskegee Institute community, she was married to Cleve Abbott. Together they worked to create one of the first organized women's college athletic programs at Tuskegee. They coached the first all-Black girls' track team to enter the Olympics. Jessie Abbott acted as the secretary for the wives of the presidents of Tuskegee as well as George Washington Carver.

== Biography ==
Abbott was born on March 23, 1897. and went to school in Des Moines, Iowa. She met her future husband, Cleve Abbott, at the Drake Relays while he was a student at South Dakota State College. She died on August 8, 1982, in Tuskegee.
