= 1935 Texas College Steers football team =

American college football season

1935 Texas College Steers football

Black college national champion SWAC champion

Chocolate Bowl, W 9–0 vs. Alabama State
- Conference: Southwestern Athletic Conference
- Record: 9–0–1 (5–0–1 SWAC)
- Head coach: Ace Mumford (5th season)
- MVP: "Paps" Walker

1935 Southwestern Athletic Conference football standings
	Conf.					Overall
Team	W		L		T	W		L		T
Texas College $	5	–	0	–	1	9	–	0	–	1
Wiley	3	–	0	–	3	8	–	0	–	3
Bishop	3	–	2	–	1	7	–	2	–	1
Prairie View	1	–	1	–	4	4	–	3	–	4
Langston	1	–	3	–	2	2	–	3	–	2
Southern	1	–	4	–	1	1	–	7	–	1
Samuel Huston	1	–	5	–	0	1	–	6	–	0
$ – Conference champion

The 1935 Texas College Steers football team was an American football team that represented Texas College as a member of the Southwestern Athletic Conference (SWAC) during the 1935 college football season. In their fifth and final season under head coach Ace Mumford, the team compiled an overall record of 9–0–1 record with a mark of 5–0–1 in conference play, winning the SWAC title, and outscored all opponents by a total of 341 to 19. The season concluded with a victory over Alabama State in the Chocolate Bowl, a game billed as determining "the outstanding 'chocolate team' of the nation." Following the victory over Alabama State, Texas College was recognized as the 1935 black college national champion.

Key players included quarterback "Paps" Walker, fullback Myles Anderson, and halfback Edwin Turner. Walker was selected as the team's most valuable player.

The 1935 team compiled the program's second consecutive undefeated season under Mumford. Having never won more than four games in a season prior to 1934, Mumford's 1934 and 1935 teams compiled a combined record of 18–0–3. Mumford left the Texas College program after the 1935–36 academic year to assume coaching duties at Southern University. He first came to the attention of Southern officials after his Texas College team soundly defeated the Jaguars; afterward, when a Southern dean accused his Texas College players of stealing from the school, Mumford forced all of his players to get off of the team bus and to display their personal belongings until the school's missing items could be located. Southern officials were impressed by both his coaching and disciplinary actions of that day.

== Schedule ==
Date	Opponent	Site	Result	Attendance	Source
September 26	Arkansas AM&N*	Fair Park; Tyler, TX	W 65–6		
October 12	Paul Quinn*	Steer Stadium; Tyler, TX	W 76–0		
October 19	at Jarvis*	Hawkins, TX	W 14–0		
October 26	Langston	Lion Stadium; Tyler, TX	W 49–6		
November 2	Prairie View	Lion Stadium; Tyler, TX	W 7–0		
November 9	Southern	Baton Rouge, LA	W 27–0		
November 16	Bishop	Lion Stadium; Tyler, TX	W 16–7		
November 23	Samuel Huston	Lion Stadium; Tyler, TX	W 78–0		
November 28	Wiley	Fair Park Stadium; Tyler, TX	T 0–0	4,000	
December 27	Alabama State*	Lion Stadium; Tyler, TX (Chocolate Bowl)	W 9–0	3,000	
*Non-conference game
