= 1940 Southern Jaguars football team =

American college football season

1940 Southern Jaguars football

SWAC co-champion
- Conference: Southwestern Athletic Conference
- Record: 8–1 (5–1 SWAC)
- Head coach: Ace Mumford (5th season)
- Home stadium: University Stadium

1940 Southwestern Athletic Conference football standings
	Conf.					Overall
Team	W		L		T	W		L		T
Southern +	5	–	1	–	0	8	–	1	–	0
Langston +	5	–	1	–	0	6	–	3	–	0
Prairie View	4	–	2	–	0	6	–	3	–	0
Texas College	3	–	2	–	1	4	–	2	–	1
Bishop	2	–	4	–	0	4	–	4	–	0
Wiley	1	–	4	–	1	3	–	5	–	1
Arkansas AM&N	0	–	6	–	0	3	–	8	–	0
+ – Conference co-champions

The 1940 Southern Jaguars football team was an American football team that represented Southern University as a member of the Southwestern Athletic Conference (SWAC) during the 1940 college football season. Led by Ace Mumford in his fifth season as head coach, the Jaguars compiled an overall record of 8–1, with a mark of 5–1 in conference play, and finished as SWAC co-champion.

The team played its home games at University Stadium in Scotlandville, Louisiana (which has since been annexed into the Baton Rouge city limits).

== Schedule ==
Date	Opponent	Site	Result	Attendance	Source
September 28	Leland*	University Stadium; Scotlandville, LA	W 31–0	3,800	
October 5	Bishop	University Stadium; Scotlandville, LA	W 12–6	2,200	
October 12	at Langston	Anderson Field; Langston, OK	L 0–20		
October 28	vs. Wiley	State Fair Stadium; Shreveport, LA	W 19–0		
November 9	at Texas College	Steer Field; Tyler, TX	W 19–0	1,500	
November 16	Bluefield State*	University Stadium; Scotlandville, LA	W 26–7	5,000	
November 23	Arkansas AM&N	University Stadium; Scotlandville, LA	W 40–0	2,300	
November 28	at Prairie View	Blackshear Field; Prairie View, TX	W 7–2	3,000	
December 7	vs. Xavier (LA)*	City Park Field; Baton Rouge, LA	W 28–0	7,000	
*Non-conference game
