= 1932 Florida A&M Rattlers football team =

American college football season

1932 Florida A&M Rattlers football
- Conference: Southern Intercollegiate Athletic Conference
- Record: 5–3 (0–3 SIAC)
- Head coach: Ted A. Wright (2nd season)

1932 Southern Intercollegiate Athletic Conference football standings
	Conf.					Overall
Team	W		L		T	W		L		T
Tuskegee $	5	–	0	–	0	5	–	1	–	0
Morris Brown	5	–	1	–	1	6	–	1	–	1
Fisk	3	–	1	–	0	6	–	2	–	0
Alabama State	2	–	1	–	1	6	–	1	–	1
Talladega	2	–	1	–	1	?	–	?	–	?
Clark (GA)	3	–	2	–	1	4	–	3	–	1
South Carolina State	2	–	2	–	0	5	–	2	–	0
Morehouse	2	–	4	–	0	3	–	4	–	1
Lane	0	–	1	–	0	?	–	?	–	?
Edward Waters	0	–	2	–	0	?	–	?	–	?
Miles	0	–	2	–	0	4	–	2	–	0
Florida A&M	0	–	3	–	0	5	–	3	–	0
Knoxville	0	–	6	–	0	2	–	7	–	0
$ – Conference champion

The 1932 Florida A&M Rattlers football team represented represented Florida Agricultural and Mechanical College for Negroes (FAMC)—now known as Florida A&M University—as a member of the Southern Intercollegiate Athletic Conference (SIAC) during the 1932 college football season. Led by second-year head coach Ted A. Wright, the Rattlers compiled an overall record of 5–3 with a mark of 0–3 in conference play.

== Schedule ==
Date	Time	Opponent	Site	Result	Source
October 7		24th Infantry, Fort Benning*	Tallahassee, FL	W 9–0	
October 14	1:30 p.m.	at Claflin*	Orangeburg County fair; Orangeburg, SC	W 20–0	
October 22	3:00 p.m.	at Bethune–Cookman*	College Park; Daytona Beach, FL	W 20–0	
October 28		Alabama State	Tallahassee, FL	L 0–7	
November 4	3:00 p.m.	South Carolina State^{†}	Tallahassee, FL	L 0–12	
November 18		Morris Brown	Tallahassee, FL	L 0–32	
November 24	1:00 p.m.	at Florida Normal*	Lewis Park; St. Augustine, FL	W 25–6	
		Alabama A&M*		W 54–7	
*Non-conference game; ^{†}Homecoming; All times are in Eastern time
