= 1934 Prairie View Panthers football team =

American college football season

1934 Prairie View Panthers football

Prairie View Bowl, L 6–15 vs. Tuskegee
- Conference: Southwestern Athletic Conference
- Record: 5–4 (2–3 SWAC)
- Head coach: Sam B. Taylor (4th season)
- Home stadium: Blackshear Field

1934 Southwestern Athletic Conference football standings
	Conf.					Overall
Team	W		L		T	W		L		T
Texas College $	4	–	0	–	1	9	–	0	–	1
Langston	3	–	1	–	0	7	–	2	–	0
Southern	1	–	1	–	0	4	–	3	–	0
Prairie View	2	–	3	–	0	5	–	4	–	0
Wiley	1	–	2	–	1	5	–	4	–	1
Samuel Huston	0	–	4	–	0	?	–	?	–	?
Bishop	0	–	0	–	0	6	–	0	–	1
$ – Conference champion

The 1934 Prairie View Panthers football team was an American football team that represented Prairie View Normal and Industrial College—now known as Prairie View A&M University—as a member of the Southwestern Athletic Conference (SWAC) during the 1934 college football season. Led by fourth-year head coach Sam B. Taylor the Panthers compiled an overall record of 5–4 with a mark of 2–3 in conference play, placing fourth in the SWAC.

== Schedule ==
Date	Opponent	Site	Result	Attendance	Source
October 6	at Paul Quinn*	Waco, TX	W 33–0		
October 10	Mary Allen*	Blackshear Field; Prairie View, TX	W 47–0		
October 15	vs. Wiley	State Fair Stadium; Dallas, TX (State Fair Classic)	W 13–12	8,500	
October 20	Samuel Huston	Blackshear Field; Prairie View, TX	W 27–0		
October 27	at Arkansas AM&N*	Athletic Field; Pine Bluff, AR	W 13–6		
November 3	Texas College^{†}	Blackshear Field; Prairie View, TX	L 7–17		
November 24	at Langston	Anderson Field; Langston, OK	L 0–7		
November 29	Southern	Blackshear Field; Prairie View, TX	L 0–7		
January 1	vs. Tuskegee*	Buffalo Stadium; Houston, TX (Prairie View Bowl)	L 6–15	2,000	
*Non-conference game; ^{†}Homecoming
