= Alexander Durley =

Biographical details
- Born: December 18, 1912; Texas, U.S.
- Died: July 18, 1980 (aged 67); Houston, Texas, U.S.

Playing career
- 1931–1935: Texas College

Coaching career (HC unless noted)
- 1942–1948: Texas College
- 1949–1964: Texas State / Texas Southern
- 1969–1970: Prairie View A&M

Administrative career (AD unless noted)
- 1949–1964: Texas State / Texas Southern
- 1969–1971: Prairie View A&M

Head coaching record
- Overall: 154–80–15
- Bowls: 1–4–1

Accomplishments and honors

Championships
- 3 SWAC (1942, 1944, 1956); 1 MWAA (1952)

Alexander Durley (December 18, 1912 – July 18, 1980) was an American college football coach, college athletics administrator, and mathematics professor. He served as the head football coach at Texas College from 1942 to 1948, at Texas Southern University from 1949 to 1964, and at Prairie View A&M University from 1969 to 1970. He was inducted into the Southwestern Athletic Conference Hall of Fame in 1992.

== Career ==
Durley was the head football coach at Texas College from 1942 to 1948, compiling a record of 45–15–6. From 1949 to 1964, Durley was head football coach and director of athletics at Texas Southern University. His coaching record there was 101–55–8. In their second year in the Midwest Athletic Association, Texas Southern went undefeated; in 1952 they beat Prairie View A&M in the Prairie View Bowl to win the black college football national championship; in their first season in the Southwestern Athletic Conference, 1958–1959, they shared the league championship with Wiley College. He was also a mathematics professor at TSU.

Durley was also the tenth head football coach at Prairie View A&M University for two seasons, from 1969 to 1970. His coaching record at Prairie View was 8–10–1.

== Death and honors ==
Durley died on July 18, 1980, in Houston, Texas. He was survived by his wife, Wilma, and two daughters.

In 1992 Durley was inducted into the Southwestern Athletic Conference Hall of Fame. The Alexander Durley Sports Complex at TSU is named for him.

== Head coaching record ==
Year	Team	Overall	Conference	Standing	Bowl/playoffs
Texas College Steers (Southwestern Athletic Conference) (1942–1948)
1942	Texas College	7–1	4–0	1st	L Orange Blossom Classic, W Vulcan Bowl
1943	Texas College	5–1–1			
1944	Texas College	8–1	5–1	T–1st	W Flower Bowl
1945	Texas College	7–3–1	3–2–1	3rd	L Vulcan
1946	Texas College	5–4–1	3–3	T–4th	
1947	Texas College	5–2–3	3–1–1	3rd	
1948	Texas College	8–3	5–2	T–2nd	
Texas College:		45–15–6			
Texas State Tigers (Independent) (1949–1950)
1949	Texas State	3–6–1			
1950	Texas State	5–5–1			
Texas Southern Tigers (Midwest Athletic Association) (1951–1954)
1951	Texas Southern	7–2–1	1–0–1		
1952	Texas Southern	10–0–1	2–0–1	T–1st	W Prairie View
1953	Texas Southern	7–3	2–1	T–3rd	L Prairie View
1954	Texas Southern	5–4–2	2–1–1	3rd	L Prairie View
Texas Southern Tigers (Southwestern Athletic Conference) (1955–1964)
1955	Texas Southern	7–2–1	5–1–1	T–2nd	
1956	Texas Southern	9–2	5–1	T–1st	L Prairie View
1957	Texas Southern	7–3–1	4–2	T–2nd	T Prairie View
1958	Texas Southern	5–5	2–3	T–4th	
1959	Texas Southern	7–3	5–2	3rd	
1960	Texas Southern	4–6	2–5	6th	
1961	Texas Southern	6–3	5–2	T–2nd	
1962	Texas Southern	7–3	5–2	2nd	
1963	Texas Southern	7–3	5–2	T–2nd	
1964	Texas Southern	5–5	3–4	T–4th	
Texas State / Texas Southern:		101–55–8	38–26–4		
Prairie View A&M Panthers (Southwestern Athletic Conference) (1969–1970)
1969	Prairie View A&M	4–5	3–4	5th	
1970	Prairie View A&M	4–5–1	2–3–1	T–4th	
Prairie View A&M:		8–10–1	5–7–1		
Total:		154–80–15			
National championship Conference title Conference division title or championship game berth
