= 1940 Prairie View Panthers football team =

American college football season

1940 Prairie View Panthers football

Prairie View Bowl, W 7–6 vs. Alabama State
- Conference: Southwestern Athletic Conference
- Record: 6–3 (4–2 SWAC)
- Head coach: Sam B. Taylor (11th season)
- Home stadium: Blackshear Field

1940 Southwestern Athletic Conference football standings
| | Conf. | | | | | Overall |
| Team | W | | L | | T | W | | L | | T |
|---|---|---|---|---|---|---|---|---|---|---|
| Southern + | 5 | – | 1 | – | 0 | 8 | – | 1 | – | 0 |
| Langston + | 5 | – | 1 | – | 0 | 6 | – | 3 | – | 0 |
| Prairie View | 4 | – | 2 | – | 0 | 6 | – | 3 | – | 0 |
| Texas College | 3 | – | 2 | – | 1 | 4 | – | 2 | – | 1 |
| Bishop | 2 | – | 4 | – | 0 | 4 | – | 4 | – | 0 |
| Wiley | 1 | – | 4 | – | 1 | 3 | – | 5 | – | 1 |
| Arkansas AM&N | 0 | – | 6 | – | 0 | 3 | – | 8 | – | 0 |
+ – Conference co-champions

The 1940 Prairie View Panthers football team was an American football team that represented Prairie View State Normal & Industrial College (now known as Prairie View A&M University) as a member of the Southwestern Athletic Conference (SWAC) during the 1940 college football season. In their 11th season under head coach Sam B. Taylor, the Panthers compiled an overall record of 6–3, with a mark of 4–2 in conference play, and finished third in the SWAC.

== Schedule ==
| Date | Opponent | Site | Result | Attendance | Source |
|---|---|---|---|---|---|
| September 28 | Tillotson* | Blackshear Field; Prairie View, TX | W 53–0 | | |
| October 5 | Texas College | Blackshear Field; Prairie View, TX | W 26–6 | | |
| October 14 | vs. Wiley | Cotton Bowl; Dallas, TX | W 18–0 | 5,000 | |
| October 26 | Arkansas AM&N^{†} | Blackshear Field; Prairie View, TX | W 39–0 | 3,000 | |
| November 11 | at Bishop | Marshall, TX | W 12–7 | 2,500 | |
| November 23 | at Langston | Anderson Field; Langston, OK | L 0–8 | | |
| November 28 | Southern | Blackshear Field; Prairie View, TX | L 2–7 | 3,000 | |
| December 14 | at Xavier (LA)* | Xavier Stadium; New Orleans, LA | L 0–13 | | |
| January 1 | vs. Alabama State* | Buffalo Stadium; Houston, TX (Prairie View Bowl) | W 7–6 | 3,000 | |
*Non-conference game; ^{†}Homecoming
