= Ted A. Wright =

American sports coach and athletics administrator (1901–1974)

Biographical details
- Born: September 20, 1901; Baldwin City, Kansas, U.S.
- Died: February 14, 1974 (aged 72); Savannah, Georgia, U.S.

Playing career

Football
- 1921–1924: Baker

Basketball
- 1921–1924: Baker
- Position: Halfback (football)

Coaching career (HC unless noted)

Football
- 1926: Western University (KS)
- 1927: Lincoln HS (KS)
- 1928: Talladega (assistant)
- 1929–1930: Talladega
- 1931–1933: Florida A&M
- 1934–1941: Xavier (LA)
- 1947–1948: Georgia State

Basketball
- 1927–1928: Lincoln HS (KS)
- 1934–1938: Xavier (LA)
- 1946–1947: Xavier (LA)
- 1948–1962: Georgia/Savannah State

Track and field
- 1947–1962: Savannah State

Administrative career (AD unless noted)
- c. 1946: Xavier (LA)
- c. 1950–1961: Savannah State

Head coaching record
- Bowls: 1–0

Theodore A. Wright Sr. (September 20, 1901 – February 14, 1974) was an American football, basketball, and track coach and college athletics administrator. He served as the head football coach at Western University in Quindaro, Kansas (1926), Talladega College in Talladega, Alabama (1929–1930), Florida A&M University (1931–1933), Xavier University of Louisiana (1934–1941), and Georgia State College—now known as Savannah State University (1947–1948). Wright was also the head basketball coach at Xavier University of Louisiana (1934–1938, 1946–1947) and at Savannah State (1948–1962).

Wright graduated in 1925 from Baker University in Baldwin City, Kansas, where he lettered in football, basketball, and tennis. He earned all-Kansas honors in football as a halfback. In 1921, he played on the Baker Wildcats football team alongside his brother, Giles O. Wright.

In 1926–27, Wright coached at Western University in Kansas City, Missouri. The following year, he was the director of physical education at Lincoln High School in Kansas City, leading both his football and basketball teams to championships. In 1928, Wright became an assistant football coach at Talladega College in Talladega, Alabama. He was promoted to head football coach the following year. In 1931, he moved on to coach at Florida A&M. Wright was hired as the head football coach at Xavier in 1934.

Wright died on February 14, 1974, in Savannah, Georgia.

== Head coaching record ==
Year	Team	Overall	Conference	Standing	Bowl/playoffs
Western University Bulldogs () (1926)
1926	Western University				
Western University:					
Talladega Tornadoes (Southern Intercollegiate Athletic Conference) (1929–1930)
1929	Talladega	6–1			
1930	Talladega	1–6	1–4	8th	
Talladega:		7–7			
Florida A&M Rattlers (Southern Intercollegiate Athletic Conference) (1931–1933)
1931	Florida A&M	2–4–1	0–2		
1932	Florida A&M	5–3	0–3		
1933	Florida A&M	5–3	3–3		W Orange Blossom Classic
Florida A&M:		12–10–1	3–8		
Xavier Gold Rush () (1934–1935)
1934	Xavier	5–7			
1935	Xavier	4–4–2			
Xavier Gold Rush (Southern Intercollegiate Athletic Conference) (1936–1941)
1936	Xavier	6–5	2–1		
1937	Xavier	6–3–1	3–1		
1938	Xavier	4–3–3	3–1–1	5th	
1939	Xavier	5–5	4–2	3rd	
1940	Xavier	5–5–1	3–3	4th	
1941	Xavier	3–7–1	2–5		
Xavier:		38–39–8			
Georgia State Tigers (Southeastern Athletic Conference) (1947–1948)
1947	Georgia State	1–5–1	1–5–1	7th	
1948	Georgia State	5–3			
Georgia State:		6–8–1			
Total:					
