= 1938 Southern Jaguars football team =

American college football season

1938 Southern Jaguars football

SWAC co-champion
- Conference: Southwestern Athletic Conference
- Record: 7–1–1 (4–1–1 SWAC)
- Head coach: Ace Mumford (3rd season)
- Home stadium: University Stadium

1938 Southwestern Athletic Conference football standings
	Conf.					Overall
Team	W		L		T	W		L		T
Southern +	4	–	1	–	1	7	–	1	–	1
Langston +	3	–	0	–	3	4	–	1	–	3
Prairie View	2	–	2	–	2	4	–	2	–	3
Wiley	2	–	3	–	1	5	–	3	–	2
Texas College	2	–	3	–	1	5	–	3	–	1
Arkansas AM&N	2	–	3	–	1	4	–	4	–	1
Bishop	1	–	4	–	1	4	–	5	–	1
+ – Conference co-champions

The 1938 Southern Jaguars football team was an American football team that represented Southern University as a member of the Southwestern Athletic Conference (SWAC) during the 1938 college football season. Led by Ace Mumford in his third season as head coach, the Jaguars compiled an overall record of 7–1–1, with a mark of 4–1–1 in conference play, and finished as SWAC co-champion.

== Schedule ==
Date	Opponent	Site	Result	Attendance	Source
October 1	Jarvis*	University Stadium; Scotlandville, LA	W 19–7	4,200	
October 8	Bishop	University Stadium; Scotlandville, LA	W 35–0		
October 15	at Langston	Anderson Field; Langston, OK	T 6–6		
October 22	at Louisiana Normal*	Tiger Field; Grambling, LA (rivalry)	W 20–0	1,500	
October 31	vs. Wiley	State Fair Stadium; Shreveport, LA	L 12–14		
November 5	Dillard*	University Stadium; Scotlandville, LA	W 24–19	2,000	
November 19	Arkansas AM&N^{†}	University Stadium; Scotlandville, LA	W 20–0	5,000	
November 24	at Prairie View	Prairie View, TX	W 20–12		
December 3	at Texas College	Lion Stadium; Tyler, TX	W 6–0		
*Non-conference game; ^{†}Homecoming
