= 1942 Texas College Steers football team =

American college football season

1942 Texas College Steers football

SWAC champion

Orange Blossom Classic, L 6–12 vs. Florida A&M Vulcan Bowl, W 13–10 vs. Tuskegee
- Conference: Southwestern Athletic Conference
- Record: 7–1 (4–0 SWAC)
- Head coach: Alexander Durley (1st season)
- Home stadium: Steer Stadium

1942 Southwestern Athletic Conference football standings
	Conf.					Overall
Team	W		L		T	W		L		T
Texas College $	4	–	0	–	0	7	–	1	–	0
Prairie View	3	–	1	–	0	5	–	2	–	0
Langston	1	–	2	–	1	6	–	2	–	1
Wiley	1	–	3	–	0	3	–	4	–	0
Southern	0	–	3	–	1	4	–	4	–	1
$ – Conference champion

The 1942 Texas College Steers football team was an American football team that represented Texas College as a member of the Southwestern Athletic Conference (SWAC) during the 1942 college football season. Led by first-year head coach Alexander Durley, the Steers compiled an overall record of 7–1, with a conference mark of 4–0 and finished as SWAC champion.

== Schedule ==
Date	Opponent	Site	Result	Attendance	Source
October 3	at Prairie View	Blackshear Field; Prairie View, TX	W 6–0		
October 17	Jarvis*	Steer Stadium; Tyler, TX	W 106–12		
October 24	vs. Langston	Page Stadium; Oklahoma City, OK	W 7–0		
November 7	Southern^{†}	Steer Stadium; Tyler, TX	W 33–6		
November 14	at Philander Smith*	Little Rock, AR	W 52–12		
November 26	Wiley	Steer Stadium; Tyler, TX	W 40–0		
December 12	vs. Florida A&M*	Durkee Field; Jacksonville, FL (Orange Blossom Classic)	L 6–12	3,000	
January 1	vs. Tuskegee*	Rickwood Field; Birmingham, AL (Vulcan Bowl)	W 13–10	6,000	
*Non-conference game; ^{†}Homecoming
