= 1936 Prairie View Panthers football team =

American college football season

1936 Prairie View Panthers football

Orange Blossom Classic, W 6–0 vs. Florida A&M Prairie View Bowl, L 0–6 vs. Tuskegee
- Conference: Southwestern Athletic Conference
- Record: 4–4–2 (1–3–2 SWAC)
- Head coach: Sam B. Taylor (7th season)
- Home stadium: Blackshear Field

1936 Southwestern Athletic Conference football standings
	Conf.					Overall
Team	W		L		T	W		L		T
Texas College +	4	–	1	–	1	5	–	2	–	2
Langston +	4	–	1	–	1	7	–	1	–	1
Wiley	3	–	2	–	1	6	–	3	–	1
Bishop	2	–	2	–	2	2	–	3	–	2
Arkansas AM&N	2	–	3	–	1	5	–	4	–	1
Prairie View	1	–	3	–	2	4	–	4	–	2
Southern	1	–	5	–	0	3	–	5	–	1
+ – Conference co-champions

The 1936 Prairie View Panthers football team was an American football team that represented Prairie View State Normal & Industrial College (now known as Prairie View A&M University) as a member of the Southwestern Athletic Conference (SWAC) during the 1936 college football season. In their seventh season under head coach Sam B. Taylor, the Panthers compiled an overall record of 4–4–2, with a mark of 1–3–2 in conference play, and finished sixth in the SWAC.

== Schedule ==
Date	Opponent	Site	Result	Attendance	Source
October 3	Texas College	Blackshear Field; Prairie View, TX	T 0–0		
October 10	at Arkansas AM&N	Athletic Field; Pine Bluff, AR	T 0–0		
October 19	vs. Wiley	Cotton Bowl; Dallas, TX	L 0–7	12,000	
October 31	vs. Lincoln (MO)*	Walsh Stadium; St. Louis, MO	W 13–0		
November 7	Xavier (LA)*^{†}	Blackshear Field; Prairie View, TX	W 6–0		
November 14	at Bishop	Marshall, TX	L 0–19		
November 21	at Langston	Anderson Field; Langston, OK	L 0–3	5,000	
November 26	Southern	Blackshear Field; Prairie View, TX	W 13–0		
December 5	vs. Florida A&M*	Durkee Field; Jacksonville, FL (Orange Blossom Classic)	W 6–0	5,000	
January 1	vs. Tuskegee*	Buffalo Stadium; Houston, TX (Prairie View Bowl)	L 0–6	3,000	
*Non-conference game; ^{†}Homecoming
