= 1940 Langston Lions football team =

American college football season

1940 Langston Lions football

SWAC co-champion
- Conference: Southwestern Athletic Conference
- Record: 6–3 (5–1 SWAC)
- Head coach: Caesar Felton Gayles (11th season)
- Home stadium: Anderson Field

1940 Southwestern Athletic Conference football standings
	Conf.					Overall
Team	W		L		T	W		L		T
Southern +	5	–	1	–	0	8	–	1	–	0
Langston +	5	–	1	–	0	6	–	3	–	0
Prairie View	4	–	2	–	0	6	–	3	–	0
Texas College	3	–	2	–	1	4	–	2	–	1
Bishop	2	–	4	–	0	4	–	4	–	0
Wiley	1	–	4	–	1	3	–	5	–	1
Arkansas AM&N	0	–	6	–	0	3	–	8	–	0
+ – Conference co-champions

The 1940 Langston Lions football team represented Langston University as a member of the Southwestern Athletic Conference (SWAC) during the 1940 college football season. Led by 11th-year head coach Caesar Felton Gayles, the Lions compiled an overall record of 6–3, with a conference record of 5–1, and finished as SWAC co-champion.

== Schedule ==
Date	Opponent	Site	Result	Source
September 28	at Kentucky State*	Frankfort, KY	L 7–19	
October 5	at Lincoln (MO)*	Jefferson City, MO	L 7–26	
October 12	Southern	Anderson Field; Langston, OK	W 20–0	
October 19	vs. Bishop	Page Stadium; Oklahoma City, OK	W 14–0	
October 26	Texas College	Anderson Field; Langston, OK	L 7–9	
November 2	at Xavier (LA)*	Xavier Stadium; New Orleans, LA	W 7–0	
November 9	Wiley	Anderson Field; Langston, OK	W 14–0	
November 16	at Arkansas AM&N	Athletic Field; Pine Bluff, AR	W 9–6	
November 23	Prairie View	Anderson Field; Langston, OK	W 8–0	
*Non-conference game
