= 1931 Tuskegee Golden Tigers football team =

American college football season

1931 Tuskegee Golden Tigers football

SIAC champion
- Conference: Southern Intercollegiate Athletic Conference
- Record: 10–2 (6–1 SIAC)
- Head coach: Cleve Abbott (9th season)
- Captain: Willis J. Hockett
- Home stadium: Alumni Bowl

1931 Southern Intercollegiate Athletic Conference football standings
	Conf.					Overall
Team	W		L		T	W		L		T
Tuskegee $	6	–	1	–	0	10	–	2	–	0
Clark (GA)	5	–	1	–	0	9	–	1	–	0
Alabama State	4	–	1	–	0	8	–	3	–	0
Knoxville	3	–	2	–	0	4	–	3	–	1
Morris Brown	3	–	4	–	0	6	–	4	–	0
Fisk	1	–	2	–	0	2	–	6	–	0
Talladega	1	–	3	–	0	3	–	4	–	0
Morehouse	1	–	5	–	0	2	–	6	–	1
Edward Waters	0	–	1	–	0	6	–	2	–	1
Lane	0	–	1	–	0	3	–	3	–	0
Miles	0	–	1	–	0	?	–	?	–	?
Florida A&M	0	–	2	–	0	2	–	4	–	1
$ – Conference champion

The 1931 Tuskegee Golden Tigers football team represented the Tuskegee Normal and Industrial Institute—now known as Tuskegee University—as a member of the Southern Intercollegiate Athletic Conference (SIAC) during the 1931 college football season. Led by ninth-year head coach Cleve Abbott, the Golden Tigers compiled an overall record of 10–2 with a mark of 6–1 in conference play, winning the SIAC title. Willis J. Hockett, a native of Wichita, Kansas, who played at guard, served as the team captain. Tuskegee played home games at the Alumni Bowl in Tuskegee, Alabama.

== Schedule ==
Date	Time	Opponent	Site	Result	Attendance	Source
September 26		24th Infantry, Fort Benning*	Alumni Bowl; Tuskegee, AL	W 26–7		
October 3		Lane	Alumni Bowl; Tuskegee, AL	W 40–0		
October 10		Wiley*	Alumni Bowl; Tuskegee, AL	W 13–0		
October 16	3:45 p.m.	vs. Fisk	Legion Field; Birmingham, AL	W 31–0		
October 24	2:15 p.m.	vs. Wilberforce*	Mills Stadium; Chicago, IL (Mid Western Classic)	L 6–15	11,000–15,000	
October 30	2:30 p.m.	Knoxville	Knoxville College field; Knoxville, TN	W 18–7		
November 7	2:00 p.m.	Morehouse	Alumni Bowl; Tuskegee, AL	W 31–12		
November 14	1:00 p.m.	at Clark (GA)	Spiller Field; Atlanta, GA	L 6–7		
November 21	2:00 p.m.	at Alabama State	Cramton Bowl; Montgomery, AL	W 32–7		
November 26	2:00 p.m.	Prairie View*^{†}	Alumni Bowl; Tuskegee, AL	W 21–0		
December 5	1:00 p.m.	at Morris Brown	Spiller Field; Atlanta, GA	W 22–7	5,000	
December 25		Lincoln (PA)*	Alumni Bowl; Tuskegee, AL	W 19–0		
*Non-conference game; ^{†}Homecoming; All times are in Central time
