= 1930 Prairie View Panthers football team =

American college football season

1930 Prairie View Panthers football

Prairie View Bowl, L 7–19 vs. Tuskegee
- Conference: Southwestern Athletic Conference
- Record: 8–3 (3–1 SWAC)
- Head coach: Sam B. Taylor (1st season)
- Home stadium: Blackshear Field

1930 Southwestern Athletic Conference football standings
	Conf.					Overall
Team	W		L		T	W		L		T
Wiley $	4	–	0	–	0	8	–	1	–	1
Prairie View	3	–	1	–	0	8	–	3	–	0
Bishop	2	–	2	–	0	2	–	5	–	0
Samuel Huston	1	–	3	–	0	1	–	5	–	0
Texas College	0	–	4	–	0	?	–	?	–	?
$ – Conference champion

The 1930 Prairie View Panthers football team was an American football team that represented Prairie View State Normal & Industrial College (now known as Prairie View A&M University) as a member of the Southwestern Athletic Conference (SWAC) during the 1930 college football season. In their first season under head coach Sam B. Taylor, the Panthers compiled an overall record of 8–3, with a mark of 3–1 in conference play, and finished second in the SWAC.

== Schedule ==
Date	Opponent	Site	Result	Source
September 27	Houston Junior College*	Blackshear Field; Prairie View, TX (rivalry)	W 15–0	
October 4	Beaumont YMCA*	Blackshear Field; Prairie View, TX	W 50–0	
October 11	at Langston*	Anderson Field; Langston, OK	L 0–6	
October 20	vs. Wiley	Fair Park Stadium; Dallas, TX (State Fair Classic)	L 13–17	
October 27	Alcorn A&M*	Blackshear Field; Prairie View, TX	W 24–6	
November 3	Texas College	Blackshear Field; Prairie View, TX	W 69–0	
November 11	Bishop	Blackshear Field; Prairie View, TX	W 20–0	
November 21	at Samuel Huston	Austin, TX	W 43–0	
November 27	Southern*	Blackshear Field; Prairie View, TX	W 13–0	
December 12	at Samuel Huston	War Memorial Stadium; Austin, TX	W 18–0	
January 1	vs. Tuskegee*	Buffalo Stadium; Houston, TX (Prairie View Bowl)	L 7–19	
*Non-conference game
