= 1942 Wiley Wildcats football team =

American college football season

1942 Wiley Wildcats football
- Conference: Southwestern Athletic Conference
- Record: 3–4 (1–3 SWAC)
- Head coach: Fred T. Long (20th season)
- Home stadium: Wiley Field

1942 Southwestern Athletic Conference football standings
	Conf.					Overall
Team	W		L		T	W		L		T
Texas College $	4	–	0	–	0	7	–	1	–	0
Prairie View	3	–	1	–	0	5	–	2	–	0
Langston	1	–	2	–	1	6	–	2	–	1
Wiley	1	–	3	–	0	3	–	4	–	0
Southern	0	–	3	–	1	4	–	4	–	1
$ – Conference champion

The 1942 Wiley Wildcats football team represented Wiley College as a member of the Southwestern Athletic Conference (SWAC) during the 1942 college football season. Led by 20th-year head coach Fred T. Long, the Wildcats compiled an overall record of 3–4, with a conference record of 1–3, and finished fourth in the SWAC.

== Schedule ==
Date	Opponent	Site	Result	Attendance	Source
October 3	Jarvis*	Wiley Field; Marshall, TX	W 54–0		
October 19	vs. Prairie View	Cotton Bowl; Dallas, TX (State Fair Classic (TX))	L 0–6	10,000	
November 2	vs. Xavier (LA)*	State Fair Stadium; Shreveport, LA (State Fair Classic (LA))	W 9–7	3,000	
November 7	at Langston	Anderson Field; Langston, OK	L 0–20		
November 21	Southern^{†}	Wiley Field; Marshall, TX	W 7–0	4,000	
November 26	at Texas College	Steer Stadium; Tyler, TX	L 0–40		
December 12	vs. Xavier (LA)*	Baton Rouge H.S. Stadium; Baton Rouge, LA (Louisiana State Classic)	L 0–7		
*Non-conference game; ^{†}Homecoming
