= 1939 Southern Jaguars football team =

American college football season

1939 Southern Jaguars football
- Conference: Southwestern Athletic Conference
- Record: 4–5–1 (1–4–1 SWAC)
- Head coach: Ace Mumford (4th season)
- Home stadium: University Stadium

1939 Southwestern Athletic Conference football standings
	Conf.					Overall
Team	W		L		T	W		L		T
Langston $	5	–	0	–	1	7	–	0	–	1
Prairie View	3	–	2	–	1	5	–	2	–	1
Arkansas AM&N	3	–	2	–	1	6	–	3	–	1
Bishop	2	–	2	–	2	3	–	2	–	2
Wiley	3	–	3	–	0	6	–	5	–	0
Southern	1	–	4	–	1	4	–	5	–	1
Texas College	1	–	5	–	0	1	–	6	–	1
$ – Conference champion

The 1939 Southern Jaguars football team was an American football team that represented Southern University as a member of the Southwestern Athletic Conference (SWAC) during the 1939 college football season. In their fourth season under head coach Ace Mumford, the Jaguars compiled an overall record of 4–5–1, with a mark of 1–4–1 in conference play, and finished sixth in the SWAC.

The team played its home games at University Stadium in Scotlandville, Louisiana (which has since been annexed into the Baton Rouge city limits).

== Schedule ==
Date	Opponent	Site	Result	Attendance	Source
September 30	Alabama A&M*	University Stadium; Scotlandville, LA	W 26–6	2,000	
October 7	at Bishop	Marshall, TX	T 0–0		
October 14	Langston	University Stadium; Scotlandville, LA	L 0–6	3,000	
October 21	at Louisiana Normal*	Tiger Field; Grambling, LA (rivalry)	W 53–7	2,000	
October 30	vs. Wiley	State Fair Stadium; Shreveport, LA	L 9–12		
November 11	Texas College	University Stadium; Scotlandville, LA	W 6–0		
November 18	Tuskegee*^{†}	University Stadium; Scotlandville, LA	W 26–12		
November 25	at Arkansas AM&N	Athletic Field; Pine Bluff, AR	L 7–30		
November 30	Prairie View	University Stadium; Scotlandville, LA	L 0–13	2,500	
December 9	vs. Xavier (LA)*	City Park Field; Baton Rouge, LA	L 6–18	8,000	
*Non-conference game; ^{†}Homecoming
