= 1944 Langston Lions football team =

American college football season

1944 Langston Lions football

SWAC co-champion
- Conference: Southwestern Athletic Conference
- Record: 6–2–1 (5–1 SWAC)
- Head coach: Caesar Felton Gayles (15th season)
- Home stadium: Anderson Field

1944 Southwestern Athletic Conference football standings
	Conf.					Overall
Team	W		L		T	W		L		T
Texas College +	5	–	1	–	0	8	–	1	–	0
Wiley +	5	–	1	–	0	8	–	1	–	0
Langston +	5	–	1	–	0	6	–	2	–	1
Southern	2	–	4	–	0	4	–	4	–	0
Samuel Huston	2	–	4	–	0	3	–	5	–	0
Prairie View	2	–	4	–	0	3	–	6	–	0
Arkansas AM&N	0	–	6	–	0	1	–	7	–	0
+ – Conference co-champions

The 1944 Langston Lions football team represented Langston University as a member of the Southwestern Athletic Conference (SWAC) during the 1944 college football season. Led by 15th-year head coach Caesar Felton Gayles, the Lions compiled an overall record of 6–2–1, with a conference record of 5–1, and finished as SWAC co-champion.

== Schedule ==
Date	Opponent	Site	Result	Source
October 7	vs. Tennessee A&I*	Page Stadium; Oklahoma City, OK	T 6–6	
October 14	at Tennessee A&I*	A&I Gridiron; Nashville, TN	L 7–33	
October 21	vs. Texas College	Farrington Field; Fort Worth, TX	L 0–7	
October 28	at Southern	University Stadium; Baton Rouge, LA	W Forfeit	
November 4	at Samuel Huston	Austin, TX	W 31–0	
November 11	Wiley^{†}	Anderson Field; Langston, OK	W 9–6	
November 18	at Arkansas AM&N	Athletic Field; Pine Bluff, AR	W 18–14	
November 25	vs. Prairie View	Page Stadium; Oklahoma City, OK	W 14–6	
December 2	vs. Lincoln (MO)*	Hornet Stadium; Tulsa, OK	W 20–0	
*Non-conference game; ^{†}Homecoming
