= T. B. Ellis =

American football and basketball coach

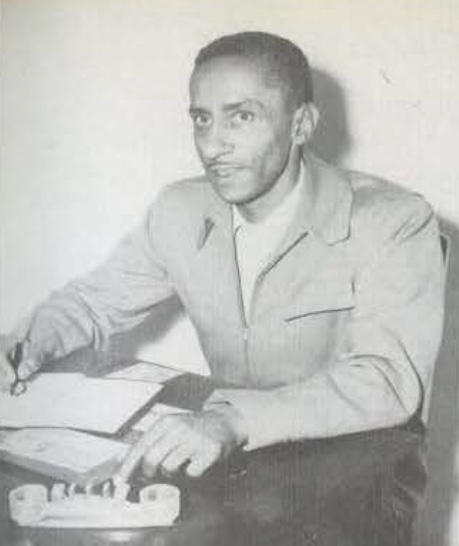
- Ellis c. 1949

Biographical details
- Born: May 26, 1912; Vicksburg, Mississippi, U.S.
- Died: March 15, 2000 (aged 87); Hinds County, Mississippi, U.S.

Coaching career (HC unless noted)

Football
- 1946–1951: Jackson State

Basketball
- 1949–1950: Jackson State

Head coaching record
- Overall: 32–24–3 (football)

Tellis Burthorne Ellis Jr. (May 26, 1912 – March 15, 2000) was an American football and basketball coach. He was the head football coach at Jackson State University in Jackson, Mississippi. He led the Tigers to a 24–21–3 record from 1946 to 1951 before being replaced by future College Football Hall of Fame coach John Merritt. He was educated at Morehouse College and Boston University.

A gymnasium and the football training facility on JSU's campus are named in his honor.
