= Prairie View Bowl =

The Prairie View Bowl was a postseason college football bowl game normally held on New Year's Day in Houston, Texas. The game was first held following the 1928 season. The annual game matched Prairie View A&M against a team from another historically black college or university (HBCU). From 1929 through 1952 the game was played in Buffalo Stadium, which was primarily a Minor League Baseball park. In 1953 the game moved to Public School Stadium (renamed Jeppesen Stadium in 1958) where it remained until the bowl folded. The 33rd and last game was played January 1, 1961. Prairie View's record in the 33 games was 19–12–2 (.606).

== Game results ==
Date	Winner		Loser		Attend	Ref
Jan 1, 1929	Atlanta	7	Prairie View	0	6,000–10,000	
Jan 1, 1930	Fisk	20	Prairie View	0		
Jan 1, 1931	Tuskegee	19	Prairie View	7		
Jan 1, 1932	Prairie View	27	Alabama State	2	4,000	
Dec 30, 1932	Prairie View	14	Tuskegee	0	3,500	
Jan 1, 1934	Prairie View	21	Langston	7	8,000	
Jan 1, 1935	Tuskegee	15	Prairie View	6	2,000	
Jan 1, 1936	Wiley	7	Prairie View	6	2,500	
Jan 1, 1937	Tuskegee	6	Prairie View	0	3,000	
Jan 1, 1938	Prairie View	27	Florida A&M	14	4,500	
Jan 2, 1939	Prairie View	34	Tuskegee	0	5,000	
Jan 1, 1940	Prairie View	7	Xavier	6	6,000	
Jan 1, 1941	Prairie View	7	Alabama State	6	3,000	
Jan 1, 1942	Kentucky State	19	Prairie View	13		
Jan 1, 1943	Langston	18	Prairie View	13	5,000	
Jan 1, 1944	Prairie View	6	Wiley	0		
Jan 1, 1945	Wiley	26	Prairie View	0	7,000	
Jan 1, 1946	Prairie View	12	Tuskegee	0	10,000	
Jan 1, 1947	Prairie View A&M	14	Lincoln (MO)	0	1,500	
Jan 1, 1948	Texas State	12	Prairie View A&M	0	5,000	
Jan 1, 1949	Wilberforce	6	Prairie View A&M	0	8,358	
Jan 2, 1950	Prairie View A&M	27	Fisk	6	5,000	
Jan 1, 1951	Bishop	6	Prairie View A&M	6	2,300	
Jan 1, 1952	Prairie View A&M	27	Arkansas AM&N	26	8,500	
Jan 1, 1953	Texas Southern	13	Prairie View A&M	12	13,000	
Jan 1, 1954	Prairie View A&M	33	Texas Southern	8	15,000	
Jan 1, 1955	Prairie View A&M	14	Texas Southern	12	10,000	
Jan 2, 1956	Prairie View A&M	59	Fisk	0	7,500	
Jan 1, 1957	Prairie View A&M	27	Texas Southern	6	5,500	
Jan 1, 1958	Texas Southern	6	Prairie View A&M	6	3,500	
Jan 1, 1959	Prairie View A&M	34	Langston	9		
Jan 1, 1960	Prairie View A&M	47	Wiley	10	1,200	
Jan 1, 1961	Prairie View A&M	19	Arkansas AM&N	8	1,500	

== See also ==
- List of college bowl games
