= Country Club Gardens =

Human settlement in New Orleans, Louisiana, United States of America

Coordinates: 29.98286°N 90.12325°W

Country Club Gardens is a residential neighborhood in Planning District Five (D5) of New Orleans, Louisiana, in the United States comprising homes along six streets:

- Bamboo Road
- Bellaire Drive
- Fairway Drive
- Garden Lane
- Maryland Drive
- Metairie Road

The area is bound to the north by the Lakewood neighborhood, and is separated from that area by the raised right-of-way of the Norfolk Southern Railway; to the east by the Metairie Cemetery and the golf course of the New Orleans Country Club; and, to the south and West, by the 17th Street Canal, one of the main arteries draining rain water out of the city and north to Lake Pontchartrain. Because of the physical location and the street network, the neighborhood enjoys one of the lowest crime rates in the city of New Orleans.

The Metairie Ridge, a natural levee formation of the Bayou Metairie (no longer extant, except in City Park) along whose course Metairie Road now proceeds, trends through the neighborhood and provides above-sea-level elevation for much of the land situated within a quarter of a mile of Metairie Road.

The three streets north of Metairie Road, Maryland, Bellaire and Fairway are connected via lanes named after women in the Friedrichs family which owned the plantation which comprised the land before it was sub-divided in 1924: Marguerite, Hedwige, Ethel and Natale.

Longue Vue House and Gardens, a mansion on Bamboo Road, is open to the public for tours.

Fairway Drive features a roundabout at the intersection with Natalie Lane which surrounds the ancient Fairway Oak. Fairway Drive is covered by a canopy of oak trees which provide residents welcome relief from the sun and humid heat of summertime New Orleans.

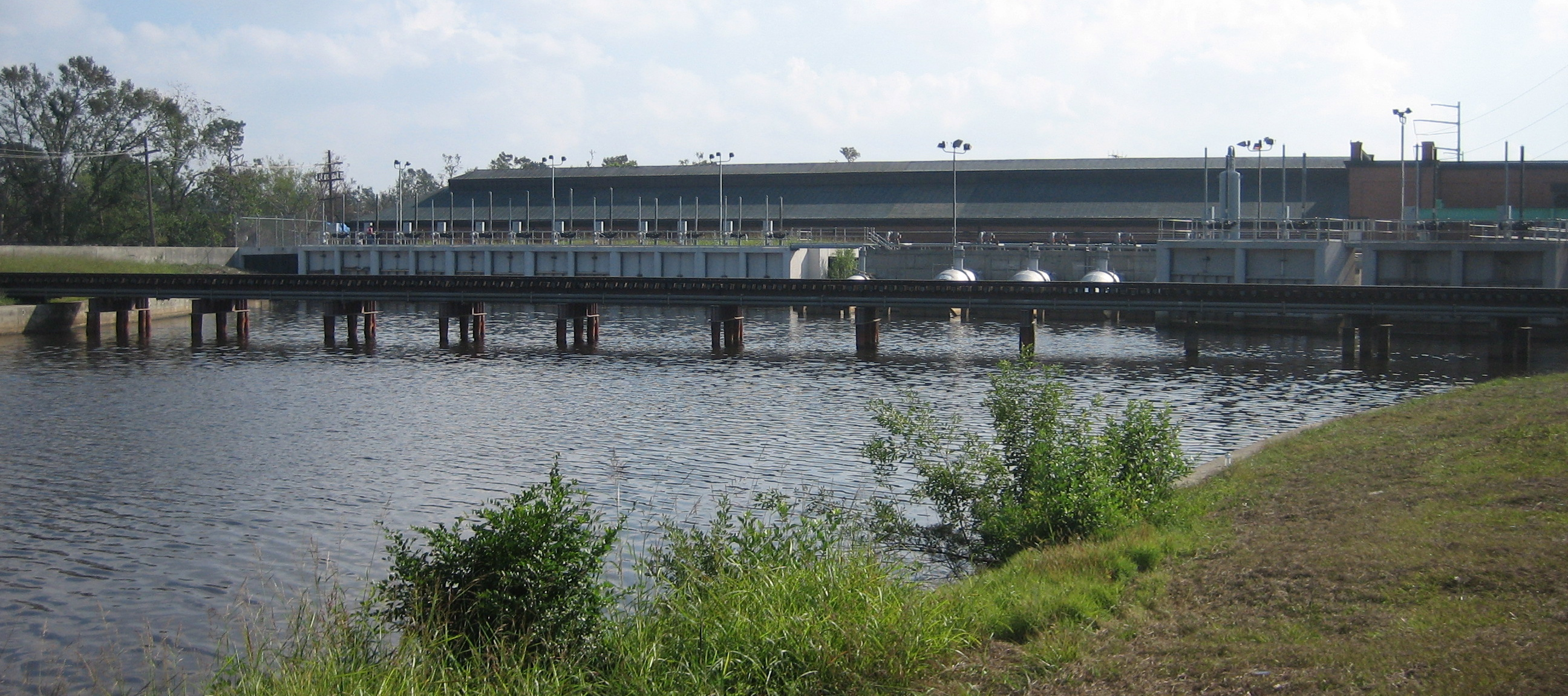
"Pumping Station 6" astride the Canal from the back (lake) side

Properties on the west side of Maryland Drive straddle the border between Orleans Parish and Jefferson Parish, and pay property taxes to both jurisdictions, the majority going to Orleans and the City of New Orleans where the street is chartered.

Homeowners in the neighborhood may belong to the Country Club Gardens Association, which collects annual dues to provide increased security in the area and social gatherings to conduct neighborhood business. Timothy Hurley, a local attorney, has served the neighborhood association as its president for many years.

== Literary works ==
- Janssen, James S. The Elves of Bellaire Drive (1989). Waldemar S. Nelson.
