= New Orleans Botanical Garden =

Botanical garden in New Orleans, Louisiana, US

Coordinates: 29.9874°N 90.0969°W

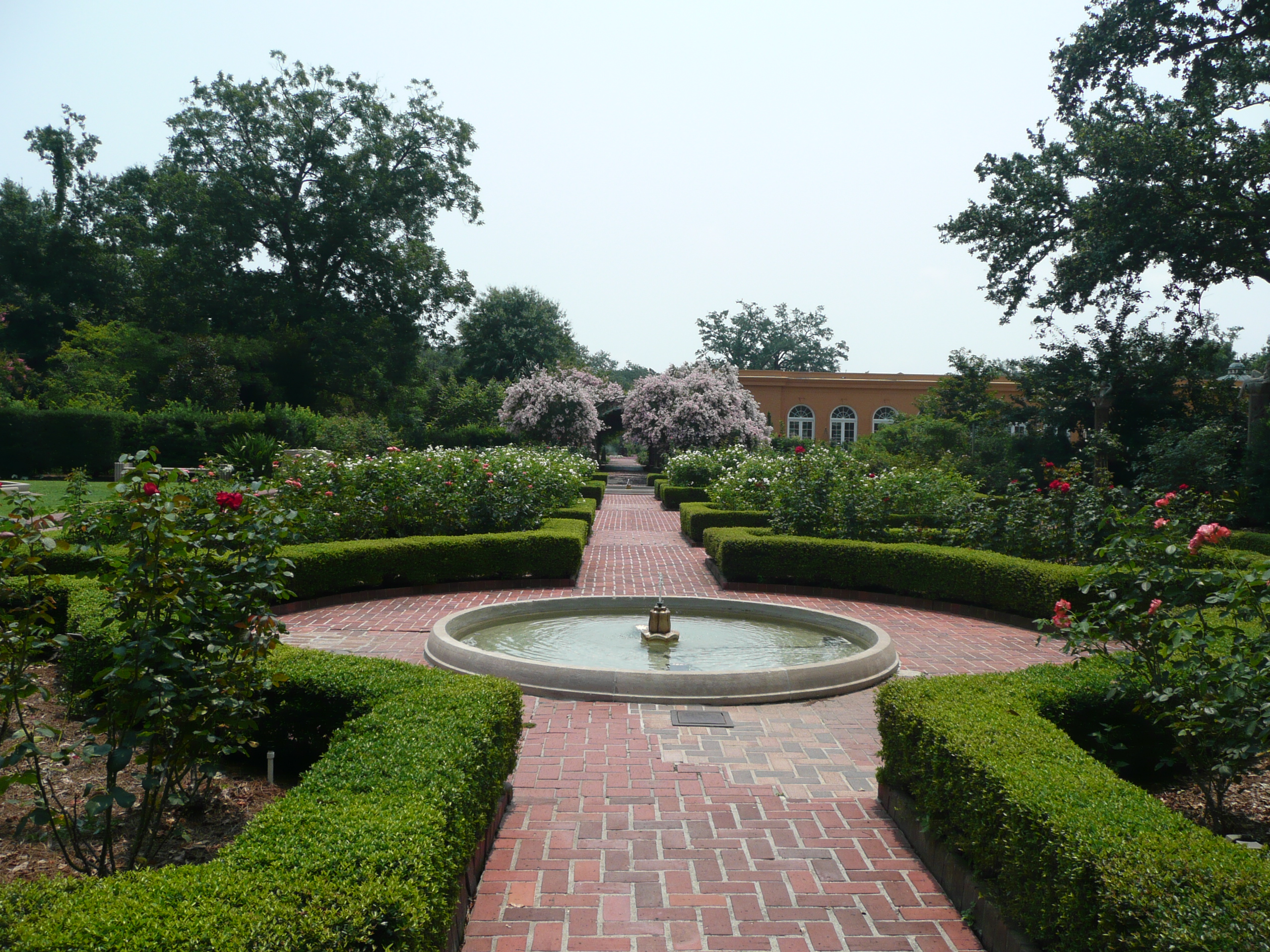
- Interactive map of New Orleans Botanical Garden

The New Orleans Botanical Garden is a botanical garden located in City Park, New Orleans, Louisiana. The first classical garden in New Orleans, it was funded by the Works Progress Administration.

== History and development ==
=== 1930s: Planning and construction ===
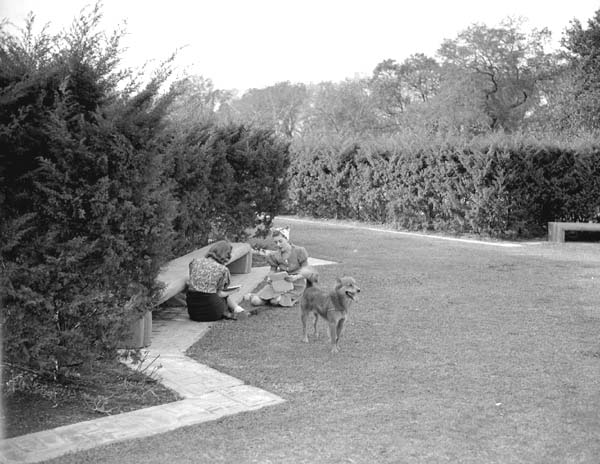
Historical image of the early years of the gardens

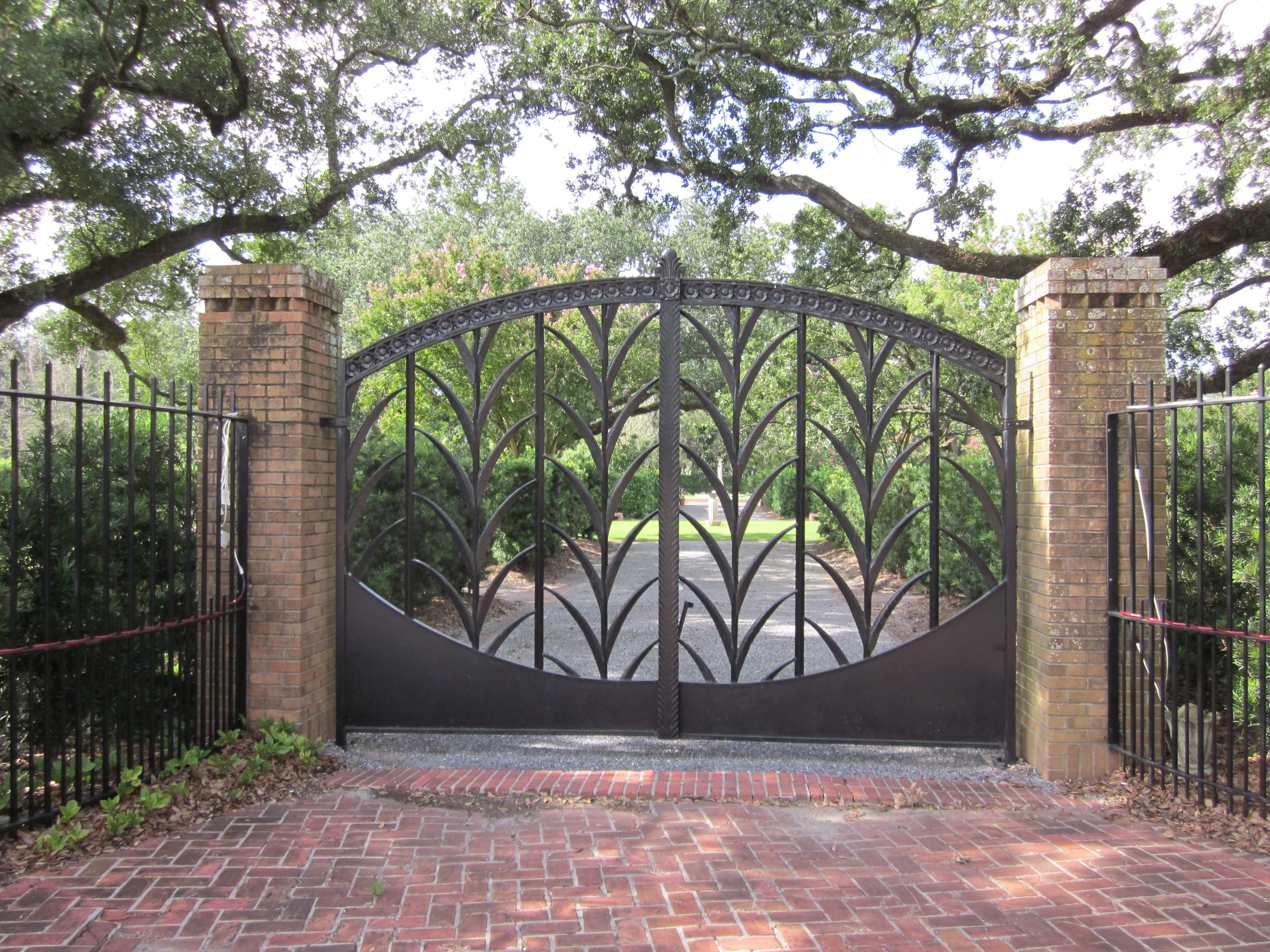
Gate by Enrique Alferez, formerly the main entrance to the Botanical Garden

The New Orleans Botanical Garden City Park (originally known as the Rose Garden) was unveiled in 1936, as a part of the massive restructuring and development project of City Park that took place in the 1930s. Although development plans for the new City Park were originally chosen in 1930, it was not until the mid-1930s that funding came from the Works Progress Administration, which administered the $12 million project that employed nearly 20,000 workers in New Orleans City Park.

Design and construction was overseen by three innovators: Architect Richard Koch, Landscape Architect William Wierdorn, and Sculptor Enrique Alférez. Together, the three artists designed the Gardens in the style of the widely popular "art-deco" era of the 1930s, constructing the clearly defined and elaborate grounds that would come to be New Orleans' first public classical garden. Using a combination of natural landscape, historic architecture, and surreal artwork, the garden was intended to be a place where families from all around New Orleans could enjoy the City Park.

=== Mid-20th century: Neglect and decay ===
With the end of the economic stagnation of the 1930s, and the "war boom" of the 1940s, the WPA program ended and federal funding dried up, leaving City Park and the Botanical Garden to largely fend for itself. The period from the 1940s to the early 1980s saw a decline in the quality and cleanliness of the garden. Upkeep was lagging, vandalism was common, and attendance was down; the park had lost the allure that had made it one of the most popular public places in New Orleans.

=== 1980s: Reconstruction ===
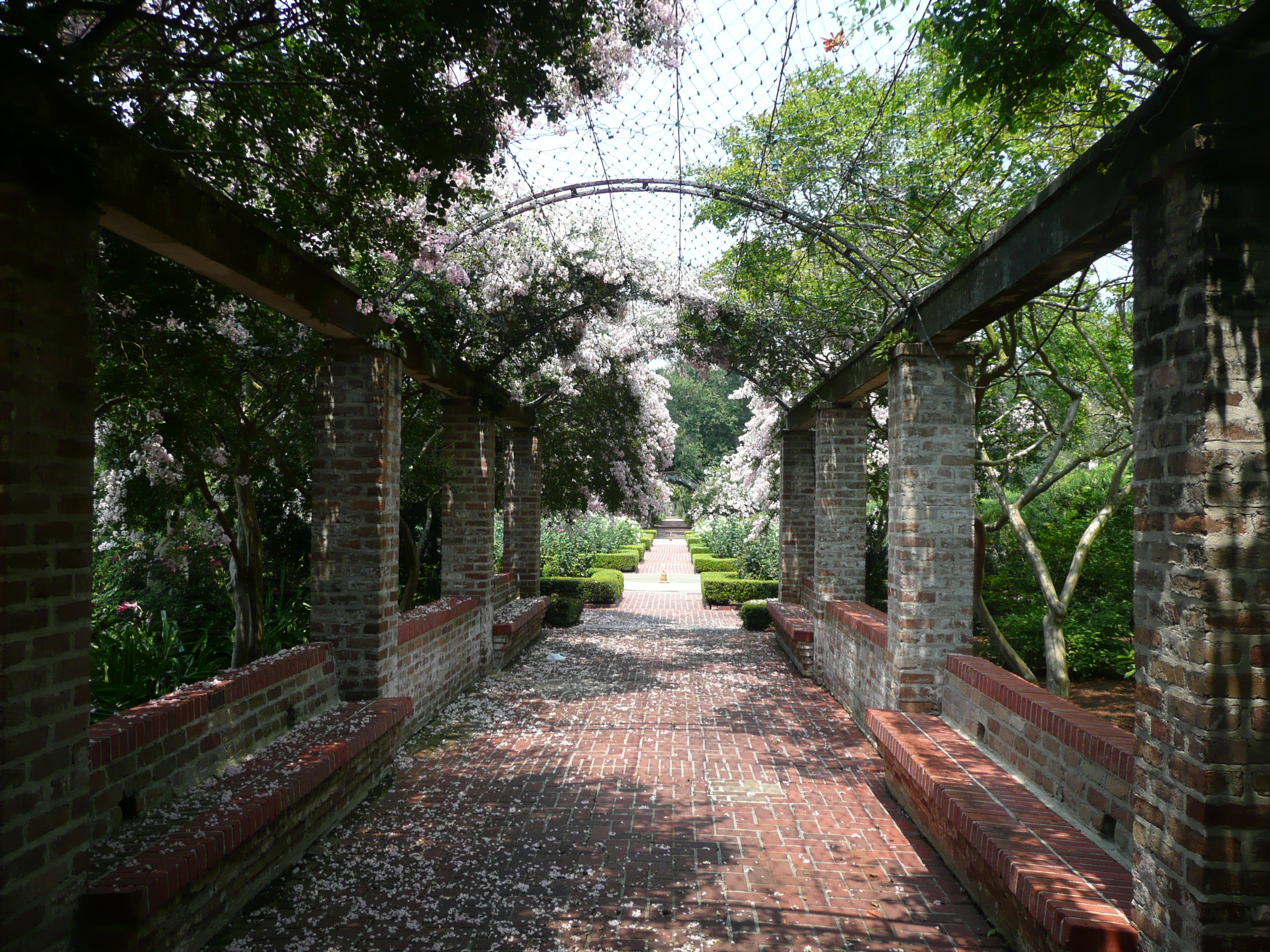
Walkway in the New Orleans Botanical Garden

With the founding of the Friends of City Park, the 1980s brought a new push to improve, renovate, and rebuild the historic Rose Garden. Paul Soniat was hired as the Garden's first director in 1982, and the Garden's name became the New Orleans Botanical garden. The garden was fenced, the original Enrique Alferez sculptures were cleaned and refurbished, and the renovation began. The restoration of the Garden followed a plan developed by landscape architect Neil Odenwald from Louisiana State University. This original Odenwald plan stabilized the garden and directed the installation of new rose beds, trees and shrubs, and many areas of the garden were replanted with new flora.

In 1987 a new Landscape Master Plan was developed by the Landscape Architecture firm Jon Emerson and associates, and architect Peter Trapolin. Emerson's plan expanded the footprint of the garden and improved the circulation and Peter Trapolin designed entrance and main pavilion building. The new building called the Pavilion of the Two Sisters was dedicated in 1995. Mexican artist Enrique Alférez was brought back to the garden after a period of almost 50 years to restore the garden's sculptures and create new pieces of artwork such as The Sundial and the Grass Gates. With the renovation and addition of many sections of the newly named Botanical Gardens, the stage was set for a surge in development that continues today. In 1987 a new holiday event created by the Garden called Celebration in the Oaks (originally Christmas in the Oaks) was a tremendous financial boost to the Botanical Garden and City Park. The event, sponsored by WWL TV and NOPSI, attracted over 100,000 visitors the first year.

=== 1990s: Development ===
The 1990s saw a significant amount of growth for the Botanical Garden, with a number of projects initiated by donors and friends of the park. The Garden Study Center was renovated in 1992, the Pavilion of the Two Sisters was dedicated in 1995, and the Lath House was built in 1998. The gardens also expanded to include nearly three acres to the east of the site. In 1997, this section became the Zemurry Azalea and Camellia Garden: a circular walk scattered with a wide variety of flowers, numerous varieties of Azaleas, Camellias, and a "footprint walk" made of plaques with the names and footprints of some of those were donors to the garden's construction. At the center of this garden, in the middle of a WPA fountain, under a large Live Oak tree, Enrique Alferez created The Flute Player, a 12' bronze sculpture of a woman playing a flute.

=== 2000–2005 ===
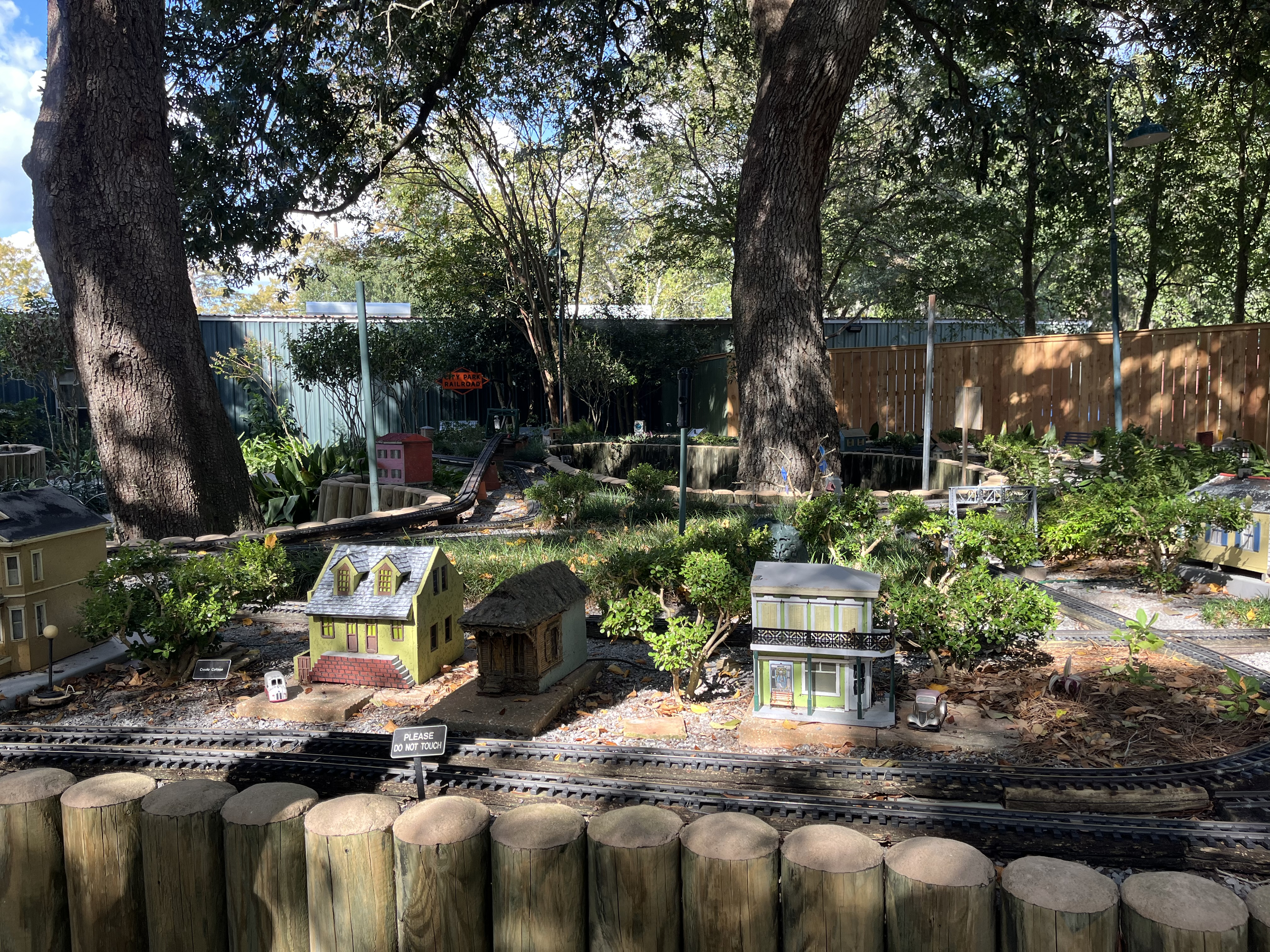
Historic New Orleans Train Garden

In the early 2000s many improvements and additions were added to the Botanical Garden. The Historic miniature train garden designed by Paul Busse was opened in 2002. Phase one of the Japanese Garden, funded by the Japanese Garden Society and designed by landscape architect Robin Tanner, opened in 2002. The renovation and expansion of the Conservatory of the Two Sisters, and the restoration of the Stove House and dungeons were completed by 2003. The Conservatory and Stove house restoration was funded by the Azby Fund. In 2003 PLANO (Professional Landmen's Society Of New Orleans), funded the development of the vegetable, fruit garden on the western end of the Botanical Garden. During this time an Enrique Alferez sculpture "Rain Goddess" was moved from a lagoon near Christians Brothers school, to the corner of Roosevelt Mall and Victory Ave. The popular music series Thursdays at Twilight began in 2003 as part of the programming associated with the bicentennial of the Louisiana Purchase.

=== Hurricane Katrina ===
The arrival of Hurricane Katrina in 2005 caused nearly total destruction of the garden's collections. Fortunately a donation from the Azby Fund, allowed the Garden to keep its staff employed and renovate its buildings and gardens. The Garden was quickly turned around and reopened for Celebration in the Oaks in early December, about 14 weeks after the storm. Approximately 90% of the plants were removed and replanted, all electrical in the garden was replaced, and the buildings were gutted and renovated.

=== 2005–2020 ===
Shortly after Katrina, the Robert B Haspel Garden Stage was built to attract people to the garden and provide an outdoor venue to promote the wealth of musical talent found in New Orleans. The Duplantier Pavilion, a clean contemporary lath structure, designed by Michael McKay was constructed and is used for small demonstrations and as a gathering place for volunteers prior to working in the garden. The Japanese Garden was expanded, doubling its size, in 2008.

A major initiative was launched a few years after Katrina to move the Botanical Garden entrance from the Pavilion of the Two Sisters to the location of an old Park building called the Little Casino. A new building plan was developed by the architect firm Waggonner and Ball, and a garden entry landscape plan was created by landscape architects Carbo and Associates and landscape architect Robin Tanner. The new entry building, Oscar J. Tolmas Center opened in November 2015 as the new entrance to the Botanical garden and Storyland. Also in the Fall of 2015 the Helis Foundation Enrique Aferez Sculpture Garden opened with 15 original sculptures by Mexican artist Enrique Alferez. The garden was designed by Tanner, and is a combination of landscape and sculpture. In October 2017 a contemporary entrance garden, designed by Carbo and Associates, with a living green wall and jumping water fountain opened to the public. In October 2019 the "Kitchen in the Garden", an outdoor demonstration kitchen located in the middle of the PLANO vegetable garden, opened.

Near the old WPA Cold Frame area, Tanner designed and constructed a group of three contemporary garden spaces, called "Concretia: A botanical art conception that seeks to reconcile the weight of concrete with the boyancy of flora while paying tribute to the forces of nature". The first garden, called "The Chapel of the Rain", features a large concrete fountain and concrete benches. The second, "Garden of the Sun", dedicated in memory of Warren H.A. Backer, features a five-foot-wide bronze sundial, and sun-loving agave plants. "Homage to the Wind" is a concrete art piece featuring harmonic wind chimes. The "Sky Garden" has as its focal point a mirrored concrete pyramid that reflects the present sky.

== Components, design, and layout ==
The Botanical Gardens today is made up of several different miniature gardens. Each garden room, or section of the garden, showcases unique species of flora, and pathways and structures help to define and separate these sections. Grass runways dominate some sections of the garden, lined with hedges of camellia, and provide direction for those walking in the garden. In more formal areas one finds brick pathways, often with various objects constructed in thanks of donors.

=== Zemurray Azalea and Camellia Garden ===
Upon entering the Botanical Gardens at the south side of the Pavilion of the Two Sisters, visitors taking the right pathways, or easterly direction, enter the Zemurray Azalea and Camellia Garden. Housing azalea, camellia, and magnolias, this section provides a fragrant walk through some of the South's most famous flowering plants. At the western edge of the section lies the Pavilion of the Two Sisters, a recent building designed in the fashion of a European greenhouse and constructed to protect oranges, honors the Wordsworth sisters. This space is used as a multipurpose facility for everything from educational seminars to wedding receptions. The Pavilion also serves as a formal barrier between the Zeumurray Garden and the Original Garden.

=== Original Garden ===
To the west of the Pavilion of the Two Sisters sits the Original Garden. The Original Garden is named as such because it represents the original portion of the formal Rose Garden. This section has four distinct garden rooms, a reflecting pool, and a conservatory. At the northern side of the Original Garden, the Parterre Rose Garden, or the Lord and Taylor Rose Garden, consists of rows of tightly trimmed Yaupon hedges outlining rose beds. The entrance to the Parterre is guarded by two large arbors. In the center of the Original Garden sits a circular area where walkways converge, with the four garden rooms of North, South, East, and West, surrounding on all sides. Each contains unique gardens- from herbaceous and tropical, to ornamental grasses and woody shrubs. Perhaps the most prominent feature in all four gardens is the 130-year-old Alferez Oak tree, named for the sculptor of many pieces in the garden. The Original Garden also houses the Garden Study Center, the Lath House, a Butterfly walk and Hummingbird Garden, along with the aquatic planting area. The aquatic planting area, with lilies, fish, and other aquatic flora and fauna, flank the eastern edge of the Original Garden and sit at the entrance of the Conservatory of the Two Sisters.

=== Conservatory of the Two Sisters ===
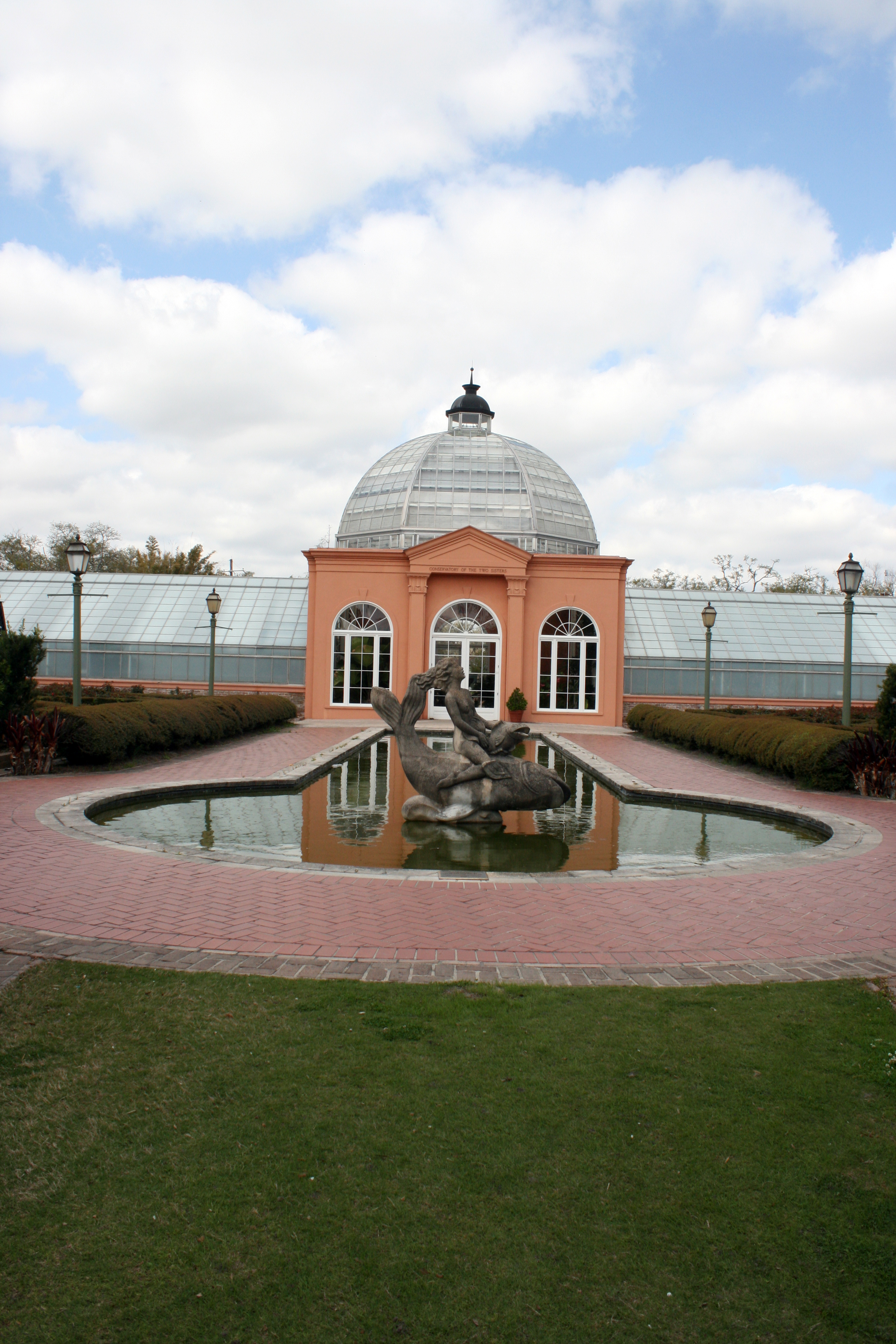
Fountain and Conservatory

Under recent renovation, the Conservatory currently houses an exhibit on Living Fossils showing many types of prehistoric plant life, fossilized foliage, mosses, and ferns. Known mostly for its remarkable glass dome, the conservatory also boasts a tropical rainforest supported by a climate control system and a waterfall and cave system that house some animals indigenous to more tropical areas of the world. The Botanical Garden is currently securing funding to expand the Conservatory and ad d additional exhibits and planting space such as a desert exhibit, a mountain exhibit, and a section to showcase the garden's orchids.

=== Exotic Foliage ===
South of the Conservatory in the Exotic Foliage area sits the Palm Court. The Palm Court contains the largest palm collection in Louisiana. Additionally, ferns, bamboo, and other groundcover from exotic and tropical areas have seasonal homes in this section.

=== Demonstration Gardens ===
The westernmost portion of the garden, just outside the doors of the Conservatory, sits a diverse area. Visitors are first greeted by cold frames, raised gardens edged in bricks originally meant to grow bedding plants for transplant. These structures are original Works Progress Administration (WPA) structures and provide a glimpse into the past. Farther west lie the vegetable and herb gardens as well as a demonstration garden that showcases seasonal vegetables, fruits, and other edible crops. An aromatic herb garden sits just northeast of the vegetable garden, this section is devoted to fragrant herbs and flowers that are known for their pungent smells, providing a diverse olfactory display as visitors also meander through the medicinal herbs section to the plot dedicated to culinary growing. A friendship garden, maintained by volunteers, provides a home for a variety of seasonal plants, and two small greenhouses here house a cactus and succulent plant collection. Finally, the Train Garden features miniature buildings made of botanical materials in a layout of the City of New Orleans. Visitors walk a pathway that follows the course of the Mississippi River and other bodies of water surrounding the city. 1,300 feet (400 m) of track carry miniature streetcars and trains that operate on weekends and for special events. Stops along the way provide history of various buildings and neighborhoods.

=== Art ===
Much of the art throughout the City Park Botanical Garden is the work of Mexican-born artist and sculptor Enrique Alferez (1901–1999). Ten of the Twelve sculptures in the Botanical Gardens are pieces originally sculpted by Alferez. The oldest of these pieces were created in 1932 when he created 5 of the original sculptures for the Gardens. He continued to construct pieces for the City Park Botanical Gardens throughout his life, his latest addition coming in 1998. He has quite a broad range of pieces throughout the garden, ranging from a large lifelike reclining nude statue, to a simple, but functional sundial located in the center of the park.

Most of the pieces he created in the garden are either cast concrete, carved limestone, or bronze. These were all popular Art Deco styles of sculpting, and even the pieces he created long past the Art Deco era were modeled in this style. Alferez also has many sculptures located throughout the city of New Orleans, including a local landmark at the Lakeside Airport. The remaining two pieces on the garden grounds were created by Rose Marie Huth in 1942, and Jean Seidenberg in 1962. The more significant of these two pieces is the sculpture by Rose Marie Huth, located near the center of the gardens at the end of the water lily pond.

=== Flowers of the Botanical Gardens ===
Past the entrance to the botanical gardens, the Pavilion of the Two Sisters is the first site. Along the sides of the grassy runway are rows of green plants with small flowers hanging from their branches. There are over 2,000 different plants from all across the world that cover the 12-acre (49,000 m²) garden.

=== Lord & Taylor Rose Garden ===
Occupying the mid-northern section of the Botanical Gardens is the Lord & Taylor Rose Garden, also called the Parterre. The first path leads to a rectangular area with separate sections for housing the various roses both antique and modern. The rosarian, Abedalhadi Mousa, is responsible for many daily activities of maintenance including deadheading, or clipping off the blackened and dried ends of the rose bushes with his pruning shears and throwing them into a large plastic bin. He clips off the wilting roses also, removing the whites, pinks, and reds that sprinkle the green landscape. The premises are scattered with such volunteers and workers, characterized by their straw gardening hats that signify their expertise with the plants around them. These employees both take care of the foliage as well as assist onlookers, directing them to such sources of information as the Dial and Discover service.

The Early Hybrid Tea rose, the antique Tea rose, and the 'Blush Noisette' rose from 1817 grow along the edges, among others. Each grouping of roses has a small black tag at the bottom with white inset writing listing its name and date of origination if available. The center rectangular beds contain many Iceberg Floribunda bushes, whose flora are a pristine white, with the beds on each side surrounding the two circular fountains overflowing with Caldwell Pink bushes. Both the Iceberg and Caldwell Pinks are modern roses that are more sensitive to the heat and must be replaced every three years. The Rose Garden leads to the Butterfly Walk.

=== Butterfly Walk ===
The air grows fragrant as one approaches the butterfly walk. The small garden houses many flowering plants that provide nectar for the butterflies and a food source for the caterpillars. Monarchs, giant swallowtails, and gulf fritillary are seen fluttering through the air, feasting on the cone flowers, lantana and coreopsis. It is a small, intimate space with flowering plants that climb up the sides of the walk, causing the butterflies to fly around any visitor that strolls through. The garden has a bench, crafted in the shape of a giant butterfly, to allow one to sit and enjoy the sight. The flowering plants are set amongst the caterpillars' food sources. There are milkweed plants for the monarchs, passion flower vines for the gulf fritillary, and dill and parsley for the blood swallowtails.

== Programs and activities ==
The 12-acre (49,000 m^{2}) New Orleans Botanical Garden, located in City Park, serves as the horticulture activity center for both Louisiana and the surrounding Gulf South, offering a wide variety of programs for kids and adults.

The actual garden walk can take 20 minutes to a couple of hours. Maps are provided at the entrance to lead visitors through the 12 acres (49,000 m^{2}) that make up the Botanical Garden. This relaxing, educational walk includes visits to the Lord and Taylor Rose Garden, The Tropical Garden, The Herb Garden, and the Yakumo Nihon Teien Japanese Garden.

Another popular display is the Train Garden, a 1/22nd size scale of the city of New Orleans as it would have appeared in the early 19th century. The miniature size trains run on the 1,300 feet (400 m) long track, and the buildings are made completely out of plant material. It is host of a train-car decorating contest during the annual Celebration of the Oaks. The Train Garden is open only on weekends.

Walking through each garden, visitors can find "Dial and Discover" signs. By calling the posted number, one can listen to a brief information speech about the flowers, plants and history of each garden. A more thorough guide can be had through the private group tours, available by reservation only. These detailed tours are reserved for groups of 20 or more and include lunch and a personal tour guide.

The Botanical Garden is also involved with the primary education of the city. They have worked closely with Lusher Charter School, providing information and programs for the students inside and out of the classroom. The Garden has donated different types of plants for the children to keep in their classrooms and use as study aids. In addition, The Botanical Garden hosts field trips that usually include a walk through the garden, a stop in the Train Garden, and some sort of hands on activity.

The Botanical Garden offers a Spring and a Fall Garden Lecture Series. Classes and lectures include topics such as plants, garden design, garden crafts, and bird watching. Dan Gill, a LSU AgCenter Specialist, a popular authority on area gardening for years, holds the most popular lectures.

Every April and October, the Botanical Garden is home to the Spring and Fall Garden Shows offering plant sales, programs for kids, plant health clinics, educational programs, and booths by various plant societies. Different vendors and companies set up within the garden, selling the latest garden tools and products. The Garden Shows have been very popular in the past and is a day full of fun activities for the entire family. Each Fall, the show includes a Scarecrow Trail, where anyone can enter to win Funniest, Scariest, Most Original or Best Traditional scarecrow. The Spring Garden Show includes a Green Fair which showcases environmentally friendly arts and crafts and building or garden products and services.

Additional plant sales include a Rose Sale held the near Valentine's Day where antique or old garden roses, and Summer Sales featuring Butterfly plants and tropicals. All plants sold are propagated by the garden and its volunteers from the Garden's plant collections.

Wedding receptions and other special events are also commonly held in the Pavilion of the Two Sisters, a huge banquet hall overlooking the Zemurray Azalea and Camellia Garden, or other facilities in the Garden.

== Post-Katrina changes ==
Hurricane Katrina caused a massive loss of plant life and damage to facilities that seriously injured the Garden's abilities to continue normal operation. Although nearly all of the buildings and sculptures were preserved, the storm's floodwaters of up to three feet (0.91 m) remained for approximately two weeks, killing nearly 90% of the plant life contained in the gardens. Such a significant loss of flora resulted in a large resurgence of volunteerism and donations working to rebuild the grounds.

Post-Katrina, individuals from all over took it upon themselves to fight for the New Orleans Botanical Gardens and tried to raise money in any way they could. One garden enthusiast from Alaska set up a donation center for New Orleans Botanical Gardens in his home and single-handedly raised thousands of dollars. Due to the combined efforts of many, few other costs to the visitor have been made since Katrina except for a dollar rise in the admission price. The same Garden Shows, concerts, and celebrations are still held here and almost all of the same classes are still offered.

Following a brief reopening for Celebration in the Oaks, The Botanical Garden reopened March 4, 2006, just nearly half a year after Katrina. Upon reopening, new classes were offered to teach New Orleanians how to replant their gardens and how keep their plants alive, even with all the damage from brackish water. Also, the Botanical Garden held ongoing plant sales for the first time.

== See also ==
- List of botanical gardens in the United States
