= Xavier Gold Rush and Gold Nuggets =

Athletic teams representing Xavier University of Louisiana

- University: Xavier University of Louisiana
- Nickname: Gold Rush and Gold Nuggets
- Association: NAIA
- Conference: Southern States Athletic Conference
- Athletic director: Pat Kendrick
- Location: New Orleans, Louisiana
- Basketball arena: Convocation Center
- Baseball stadium: Skelly Rupp Stadium
- Softball stadium: Wilcox Field
- Other venues: City Park Course; Tad Gormley Stadium; XULA Tennis Center
- Colors: Gold and green
- Website: xulagold.com

The Xavier Gold Rush and Gold Nuggets are the athletic teams that represent Xavier University of Louisiana, located in New Orleans, Louisiana, in intercollegiate sports as a member of the National Association of Intercollegiate Athletics (NAIA), primarily competing in the Southern States Athletic Conference (SSAC) since the 2026–27 academic year.

== History ==
The Gold Rush and Gold Nuggets previously competed in the Gulf Coast Athletic Conference (GCAC) from 1981–82 to 2020–21 and Red River Athletic Conference (RRAC) from 2021–22 to 2025–26.

As early as 1917, when Xavier University was still only a high school, organized sports were held on the "Old Southern" campus. As described in the 1917 Xavier Bulletin, "An athletic association has been organized by the students, under the direction of the Faculty. The football and baseball teams are able contestants with those of the standard colleges of the South. Pole-vault contests and track meets are additional sports. Excellent physical training for girls is provided in basket-ball, volley-ball, and kindred sports."

== Varsity teams ==
Xavier (La.) competes in 12 intercollegiate varsity sports: Men's sports include baseball, basketball, cross country, tennis and track & field; women's sports include basketball, cross country, softball, tennis, track & field, and volleyball; and co-ed sports include competitive cheer. Former sports included football.

A dwindling enrollment during the mid and late 1950s, the high cost of operating intercollegiate athletic programs at a small school, and a number of overall university needs, including facilities, were factors that figured in Xavier discontinuing its athletic programs in 1960. Beginning in 1967, several programs were restarted, but football was the main casualty, never returning to Xavier's campus.

Men's sports	Women's sports
Basketball	Basketball
Baseball	Cross country
Cross country	Softball
Soccer	Soccer
Tennis	Tennis
Track and field	Track and field
	Volleyball
Co-ed sports
Cheerleading

=== Men's basketball ===
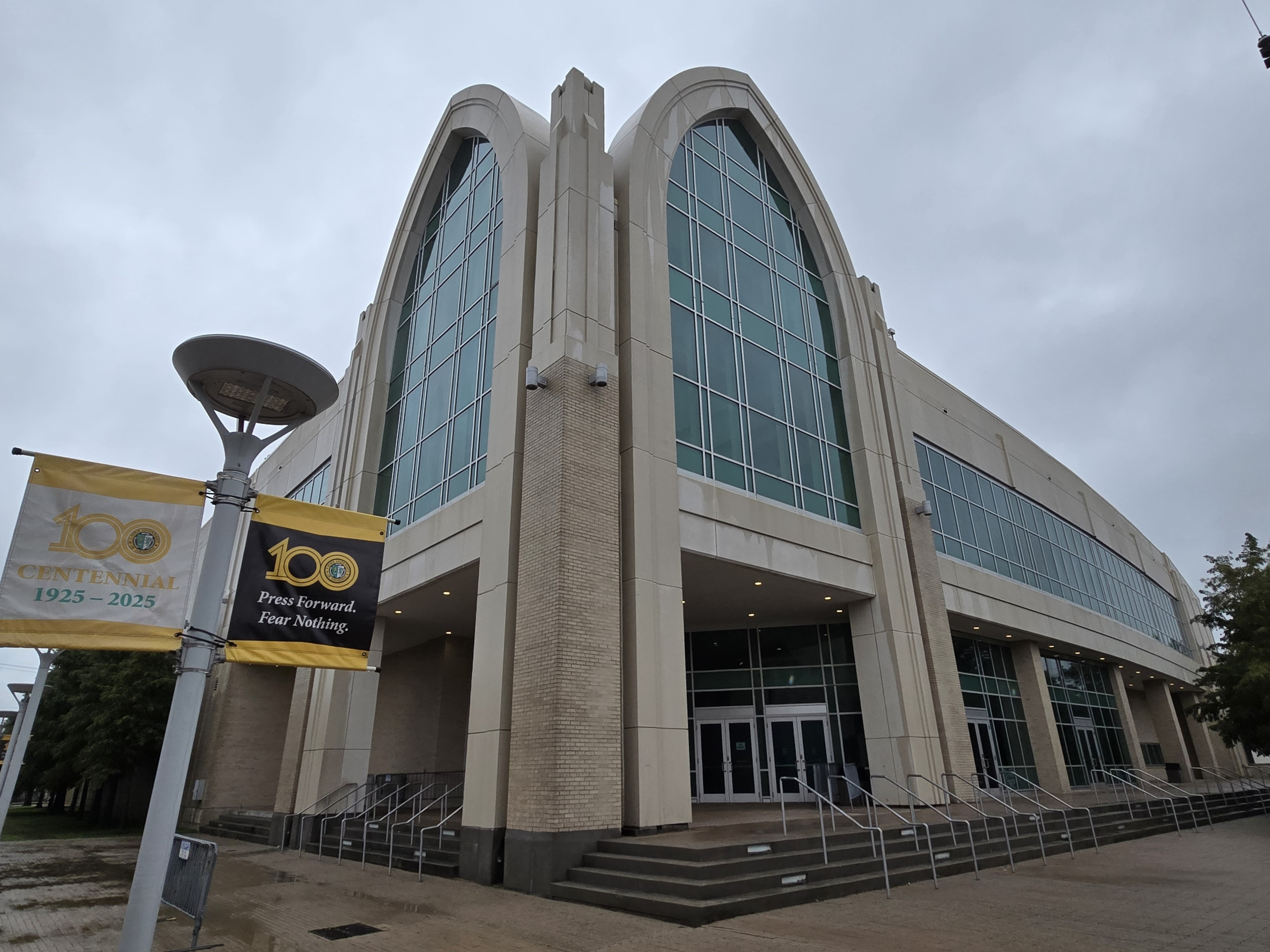
Convocation Center, basketball venue

Co-champions of the Southern Intercollegiate Athletic Conference at the time basketball was discontinued in 1959, Xavier had consistently turned out strong teams since the sport was organized on the campus, and the local university, in the early 1930s, producing a number of players for top professional teams, such as Nat "Sweetwater" Clifton of the Harlem Globetrotters. The first 'official' basketball team began in the 1926-1927 season, located on the "Old Xavier" campus, compiling an 0-1-2 record, playing against Straight University and twice against New Orleans University. After the school-wide athletics hiatus during the 1960s, the men's basketball program returned to competitive play with the 1967-68 school year. As early as 1928, the team was referred to as the "Golden Rush" and/or "Gold Rush," and also referred to as the "Cagers."

==== Accomplishments ====
- NAIA Division I National Championship Appearances (17): 2015–16, 2014–15, 2013–14, 2012–13, 2011–12, 2010–11, 2007–08, 2006–07, 2004–05, 2003–04, 2000–01, 1996–97, 1990–91, 1981–82, 1980–81, 1972–73, 1971–72
- Gulf Coast Athletic Conference Regular-Season Champions (10): 2013–14, 2012–13, 2011–12, 2006–07, 2003–04, 2000–01, 1986–87, 1985–86, 1982–83, 1981–82
- Gulf Coast Athletic Conference Tournament Champions (1): 1995-96
- Gulf Coast Athletic Conference/NAIA District 30 Tournament Champions (2): 1990–91, 1981–82
- NAIA District 30 Tournament Champions (3): 1980–81, 1972–73, 1971–72
- Southern Intercollegiate Athletic Conference Tournament Champions (3): 1940–41, 1938–39, 1937–38

=== Women's basketball ===
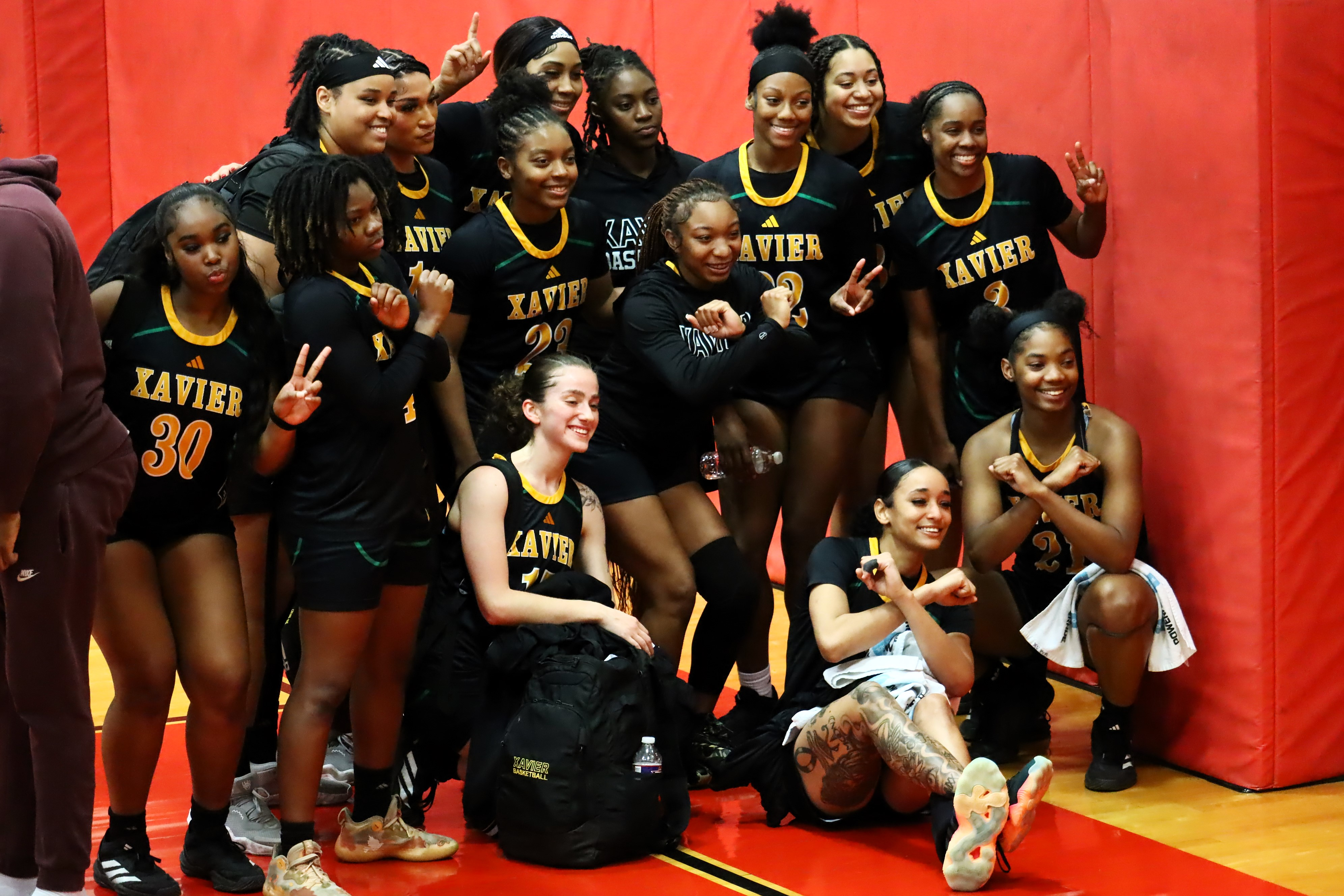
The women's basketball team in 2024

==== Accomplishments ====
- NAIA Division I National Championship Appearances (19): 2015–16, 2013–14, 2012–13, 2011–12, 2010–11, 2009–10, 2007–08, 2006–07, 2004–05, 2003–04, 2002–03, 2001–02, 2000–01, 1998–99, 1997–98, 1996–97, 1995–96, 1994–95, 1993–94
- Gulf Coast Athletic Conference Regular-Season Champions (13): 2012–13, 2011–12, 2009–10, 2004–05, 2003–04, 2002–03, 2000–01, 1996–97, 1995–96, 1994–95, 1993–94, 1986–87, 1981–82
- Gulf Coast Athletic Conference Tournament Champions (13): 2015–16, 2013–14, 2011–12, 2010–11, 2009–10, 2007–08, 2004–05, 2000–01, 1996–97, 1995–96, 1994–95, 1993-94
- Gulf Coast Athletic Conference/NAIA District 30 Tournament Champions (2): 1989–90, 1981–82
- NAIA District 30 Tournament Champions (1): 1980-81

=== Baseball ===
Baseball was an integral part of the Xavier High School era, fielding sporadic seasons throughout the 1920s and 1930s. For example, Xavier did not field baseball squads between 1925-1927, nor 1928-1930, but returned in 1931. Due to the 3-year hiatus, the 1931 team was forced to play independent and semi-professional teams to get games, including New Orleans, Straight, and Leland. As identified in 1932, "Baseball this year was almost a direct result of the Students' Organization. Although baseball was a regular part of the Junior Department, a college baseball team was organized principally through the ambitions of a few interested college men. The players furnished their own equipment, and some even borrowed suits from other teams." They originally called themselves 'The College "Rah-Rahs."' The Xavier baseball program was revived in 2019, with its first game in over 60 years played on February 23, 2021. Major League Baseball assisted in the revival of the program, lending its Wesley Barrow Stadium as home field for the program. The team began playing home games at Skelly Rupp Stadium in 2025.

==== Accomplishments ====
- New Orleans City Championship (1): 1925

=== Men's cross country ===
==== Accomplishments ====
- NAIA National Championship Appearances (13): Team in 2014, 2012, 2011, 2009, 2008, 2002; individuals in 2013, 2003, 2000, 1999, 1998, 1997, 1994
- NAIA Region XIII Champions (1): 2002
- Gulf Coast Athletic Conference Champions (9): 2014, 2013, 2012, 2011, 2010, 2009, 2008, 2007, 2006

=== Women's cross country ===
==== Accomplishments ====
- NAIA National Championship Appearances (9): Team in 2014, 2012, 2011, 2009, 2008, 2002; individuals in 2013, 2003, 2001
- NAIA Region XIII Champions (1): 2002
- Gulf Coast Athletic Conference Champions (10): 2014, 2013, 2012, 2011, 2010, 2009, 2008, 2007, 2006, 2002

=== Softball ===
The Xavier softball program played its first game in February 2021. Major League Baseball assisted in the revival of the program, lending its Wesley Barrow Stadium as home field for the program. The team began playing home games at Wilcox Field in 2025.

=== Men's tennis ===
==== Accomplishments ====
- NAIA National Championship Appearances (8): 2016, 2015, 2014, 2013, 2012, 2011, 2010, 2009
- Gulf Coast Athletic Conference Champions (5): 2010, 2009, 2008, 2007, 2005
- NAIA Unaffiliated Group Champions (3): 2013, 2012, 2011

=== Women's tennis ===
==== Accomplishments ====
- NAIA National Championship Appearances (9): 2016, 2014, 2013, 2012, 2010, 2009, 2008, 2005, 2004
- Gulf Coast Athletic Conference Champions (7): 2010, 2009, 2007, 2005, 2004, 2003, 2002
- NAIA Unaffiliated Group Champions (3): 2014, 2013, 2012

=== Men's track and field ===
==== Accomplishments ====
- Southern Intercollegiate Athletic Conference Outdoor Champions (14): 1958, 1957, 1955, 1953, 1952, 1951, 1949, 1948, 1943, 1942, 1941, 1940, 1939, 1938
- Gulf Coast Athletic Conference Outdoor Champions (1): 2004

=== Women's track and field ===
==== Accomplishments ====
- Gulf Coast Athletic Conference Outdoor Champions (5): 2015, 2014, 2013, 2011, 2004

=== Volleyball ===
==== Accomplishments ====
- NAIA National Championship Appearances (5): 2015, 2014, 2013, 2012, 2011
- Gulf Coast Athletic Conference Regular-Season Champions (5): 2015, 2014, 2013, 2012, 2011
- Gulf Coast Athletic Conference Tournament Champions (5): 2015, 2014, 2013, 2012, 2011

=== Cheerleading ===
==== Accomplishments ====
- NAIA National Champions: 2022, 2026
- NCA National Champion: 2024
- Black College National Championships Appearances, Collegiate All Girls (2): first place in 2004, second place in 2003

=== Gold Star Dancers ===
==== Accomplishments ====
- Black College National Championships Appearances (2): fourth place in 2004, third place in 2003

== Former varsity sports ==
=== Football ===
Xavier University formerly sponsored a varsity football team starting in 1925, and had been referred to as both "The Golden Wave," and "The Yellow Jackets." The Xavier University Prep team was first coached by Alfred C. "Zack" Priestley, who was also the head coach for the baseball squad, track & field, and served as Athletic Director of Xavier. Priestly himself had been a graduate of Xavier University Preparatory School (class of 1917), and had attended Howard University. Arthur Boswell, a former halfback and Howard University graduate, served as head coach of the University Football Team beginning with the 1932 season, Theodore A. Wright took over head coaching duties in 1934, and Priestly was made head coach for the 1947 season. Notably, Xavier's football team put up 536 rushing yards, 15 touchdowns, and 9 extra points on their way to beating Tougaloo University 99-0 in 1953. In 1955, Xavier played the Keesler Air Force Base team in Louisiana's first integrated college football game. Due to university-wide financial constraints, the team's last season was 1959 and the program was officially disbanded in 1960 along with all sports at the university. The team played at the XU Football Field located in Xavier Stadium, playing their first game on their home field on October 4, 1930, losing 43-0 against Wiley University.

== Athletics facilities ==
=== Current facilities ===
==== Academic Convocation Center ====
The Xavier University Academic Convocation Center opened in November 2012. The 97,000 square-foot multipurpose facility replaced The Barn (Xavier's 1,300-seat gymnasium which opened in 1937) and became the new home of XU men's basketball, women's basketball and women's volleyball. The 3,937-seat facility includes a hospitality suite, a student-athlete fitness center, a media/video room, a theatre-style meeting space, and a state-of-the-art athletic training facility. The arena contains state-of-the-art sound, lighting and high-definition Daktronics video boards for spectator comfort. The Convocation Center also plays host to many classes, graduations, sporting and community events.

==== Convocation Center Annex ====
As part of the growth of the Xavier main campus as well as the athletics department, the Convocation Center Annex project was completed in 2012. The facility, located adjacent to the Convocation Center, is an academic building featuring several classrooms, reception and lecture spaces, meeting spaces, and administrative offices of the Athletics Department, Recreation Sports and Physical Education.

==== City Park cross country Course ====
Xavier's cross country teams compete on the City Park cross country Course in City Park, a public facility. The mostly flat course is approximately three miles from the XU campus and is near the corner of Wisner Boulevard and Harrison Avenue. Xavier competed twice at City Park in 2014, including the Gulf Coast Athletic Conference Championships. City Park covers 1,300 acres and was established in 1853. It is approximately 50 percent larger than Central Park in New York City. City Park holds the world's largest collection of mature live oak trees, some older than 600 years in age.

==== Skelly Rupp Stadium ====
The Xavier baseball team's home ballpark is Skelly Rupp Stadium in Algiers, New Orleans.

==== Tad Gormley Stadium ====
Xavier's track and field teams compete at Tad Gormley Stadium (located at City Park, 2.6 miles from XU's campus) and practices regularly at the City Park Practice Track adjacent to the stadium. Tad Gormley Stadium offers great versatility for staging events in New Orleans - from outdoor athletic competitions to concerts and corporate special events. Gormley was the site of the 1992 U.S. Olympic Track and Field Trials, the 1993 NCAA Division I Outdoor Track and Field Championships and the 1998 U.S. Track and Field Championships.

Gormley's address is 5400 Stadium Drive, New Orleans, LA 70124.

Stadium Features: • 26,500 permanent seats • 400-meter polyurethane track • Artificial turf playing field • Three locker rooms • Press box with seating for 110 • Press suite with seating for 40 • Electronic scoreboard and state-of-the-art sound system

==== Wilcox Field ====
The Xavier softball team's home ballpark is Wilcox Field at the Park of Heroes.

==== XULA Tennis Center ====
The XULA Tennis Center opened on October 26, 2012, as the home of XU men's and women's tennis.

Facility Facts:

- GPS Driving Location: 3619 Pine St., New Orleans LA 70125
- Facility cost: $2.5 million
- Architect: Manning Architects
- Contractor: Gibbs Construction
- First women's dual match: Xavier 9, Loyola 0 on January 25, 2013
- First men's dual match: Xavier 7, Loyola 2 on February 6, 2013
- First collegiate dual match not involving Xavier: Idaho 4, Youngstown State 3 (women) on March 10, 2013

=== Former facilities ===
==== The Barn ====
The Barn was the former home arena for the men's and women's basketball teams and volleyball team located on the Xavier campus. It opened in 1937 and was demolished in 2013.

==== Wesley Barrow Stadium ====
Wesley Barrow Stadium is a 650-seat baseball and softball stadium located in the Pontchartrain Park section of New Orleans, Louisiana. The facilty was home to the Xavier Gold Rush baseball team and Xavier Gold Nuggets softball team from 2021 through 2024. The stadium includes a 200-square-foot climate-controlled press box, a public address system and LED scoreboard. The baseball field features professional-sized artificial turf with a clay pitcher's mound and two fenced bullpens.

==== Xavier Stadium ====
After purchasing the new land for Xavier University, and prior to the construction of the Administration Building, the site served as the original field for Xavier's athletic teams. Xavier Stadium is the former stadium that included the XULA football field, encircled by an N.A.A.U. quarter-mile oval track. It served as the home field for both the Xavier football and track and field teams. The stadium was located at the corner of Washington Street and Pine Street in New Orleans. The field was officially dedicated with the Xavier football team playing Wiley College, on October 4th, 1930, losing 43-0.

=== Non-varsity athletic facilities ===
==== Fitness Center ====
On June 24, 2015, the university opened its Fitness Center. The $3.6 million facility is built between the Living Learning Center and St. Martin de Porres Hall, Xavier's two largest student residences on the site of the former B. Samuels building, which was bought and demolished. The first floor of the two-story facility offers an NCAA/NAIA regulation-sized basketball court, an office, a lounge area and an area with free weights and weight machines. The second floor consists of a three-lane walking/running track, a cardio room, spin studio and other multi-functional studios. Exercise machines will be available throughout the facility. The basketball court will be mostly used for intramural events such as basketball and volleyball, large exercise classes, fitness activities, yoga, dance and Zumba classes. The court can be divided with a retractable curtain to offer multiple activities simultaneously. This is the fourth XU athletics facility to open in three years.

== See also ==
- National Association of Intercollegiate Athletics
