= City Park Cross Country Course =

Cross country course in New Orleans, US

Coordinates: 30.0006°N 90.0534°W

- Interactive map of City Park Cross Country Course
- Type: Urban park
- Location: New Orleans, Louisiana
- Status: Open all year

The City Park Cross Country Course is a cross country course in City Park in New Orleans. The 2.00 mile/3.22 km grass loop cross country course is all flat and starts near the corner of Wisner Boulevard and Harrison Avenue.

The course is the home course for the Xavier Gold Rush and Gold Nuggets men's and women's cross country teams.

== Events ==
College cross country meets are held on the course. The annual Sugar Bowl Cross Country Classic uses the course for its meet. The 2014 and 2016 Gulf Coast Athletic Conference cross country championships were held at the course.

The course also hosts LHSAA cross country meets.
