= City Park Golf Courses (New Orleans) =

Two golf courses in New Orleans, Louisiana

- Interactive map of City Park Golf Courses

Club information
- Location: New Orleans, Louisiana, United States
- Established: 1902
- Type: Public
- Owner: New Orleans City Park
- Operator: Bayou District Foundation
- Total holes: 36
- Tournaments: Crescent City Open (1938), New Orleans Open (twelve times)(1939-1962)
- Website: City Park Golf Courses website
- Designed by: John Tobin (original), Rees Jones, Inc. and Torre Design Consortium, LTD. (most recent)
- Par: 72
- Length: 18 hole courses - South Course:7,305 yards, North Course: 5,700 yards

The City Park Golf Courses consist of two 18-hole golf courses located in City Park, in New Orleans, Louisiana. The two courses, named the South Course and North Course, also include a driving range, an ancillary short-game facility, and two clubhouses.

== History ==
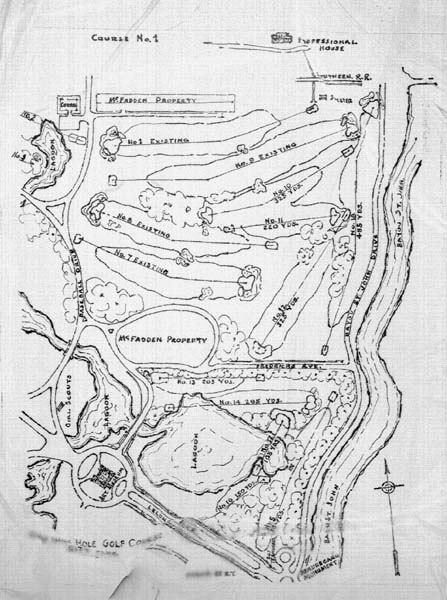
City Park Golf Course Map -1938

The original City Park golf course consisted of one course, 9 holes, and was built in 1902. It was redesigned and expanded to 18-holes in 1921 and expanded again to 27-holes in 1922. This became known as South Course or Number 2 Course.

In 1933, federal money from the Emergency Relief Administration (ERA), a precursor of the Works Progress Administration (WPA), was used to design a golf course between Harrison Avenue and the railroad tracks. This was called the East Course or Number 1 Course and was designed by William Wiedorn, a landscape architect, and city planner. The New Orleans Item Newspaper on January 14, 1935, also gives credit to Joe Bartholomew for designing the new course. The course was built during 1934 and formally opened on January 13, 1935. The length of the course at the opening was given as 6445 yards. The Crescent City Open (1938) and New Orleans Open (1939-1962) used this course thirteen different times for the tournament.

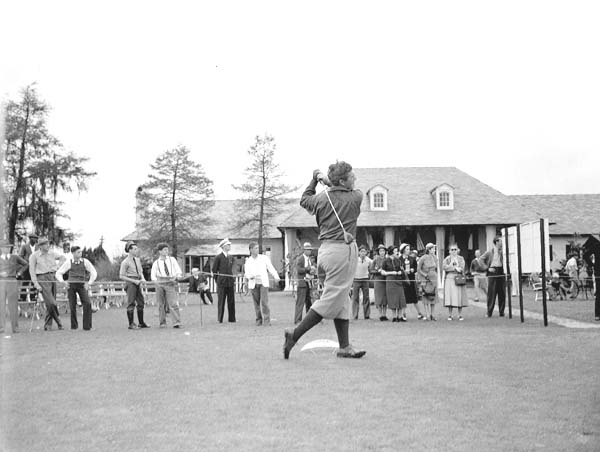
1938 Crescent City Open

The St. John Golf Club located in City Park had used the second floor of the City Park Casino building as its original clubhouse, but in 1938 a second golf club building was built near Zachary Taylor Drive and Bayou St. John. It was formally dedicated in October 1940. The St. John Golf Club has the distinction of being the oldest private club playing on a public course in the county, and it was the first golf club at City Park.

The West Course was opened in 1957. For a short while, parts of the East and West courses were combined into the Number 3 Course. The Number 3 Course was created because of plans for I-610, and also due to the requests from some players who wanted a tougher course.

In 1967, a new clubhouse on Filmore Avenue was built for the East, West and future North course. A new North Course was opened in 1968 and gave the City Park Golf Course complex a total of four courses. It was planned by a committee which included William Wiedorn and Joseph Bartholemew. The North Course area required extensive fill since it was located on low-lying land. Although it would cost more to develop the North Course, it was paid for by the Federal Government and the Louisiana State Highway Department as a result of the planned I-610 bypass that would eventually run through City Park alongside the railroad tracks. There were lengthy negotiations between City Park and the State Highway Department, which concluded with a check of $1,240,000 being presented to City Park in February 1966. The federal government paid 90% of the cost with the state paying 10%.

Prior to the north course being completed, a new clubhouse was built in 1967 on Filmore Avenue for the East, West and North Courses. The first clubhouse was built near the statue of PGT Beauregard on Wisner Avenue and then moved to Zachary Taylor Avenue before moving to the Filmore Avenue location. A double-decked driving range is located next to the clubhouse.

At different times, the four courses were officially and unofficially named differently:
South Course: Number 2 Course, Public golf course at City Park or Little course
East Course: Number 1 Course or Wisner Course
West Course: Championship Course
North Course: Lakeside Course

During the 1990s the names of the four courses were officially changed, and the entire City Park Golf Course complex was renamed Bayou Oaks Golf Complex. However, many patrons still referred to the courses as South, East, West, and North.

In 2005, Hurricane Katrina destroyed the golf complex. In 2009, the north course was rebuilt and the driving range reopened. In 2011 it was decided that when complete, City Park's new golf complex, which consists of the Championship Course and North Course, will include two, eighteen-hole golf courses, a comprehensive practice area, including the practice driving range, ancillary short-game facility and clubhouse to be located on the South Course. In November 2012, City Park announced an agreement with the Bayou District Foundation to manage and run the golf complex.

In February 2015, ground was broken on the Rees Jones, Inc. and Torre Design Consortium designed 250-acre plot Championship Course using the footprint of the former East and West Courses. The course is bound by Filmore Ave., Harrison Ave., Marconi Dr. and Wisner Blvd. and Duininck Golf Inc., was awarded the contract to build the $13.2 million course. The par 72 Championship Course will play 7,305 yards in length and will include a new clubhouse for the course.

However, the construction of the new golf course post-Katrina has not been without controversy. In the wake of the construction of a fence surrounding the 250-acre construction site, a citizen's group called the City Park for Everyone Coalition was formed to protest developing the area into a golf course.
