= Mary Oneida Toups =

Witch Queen of New Orleans

- Born: April 25, 1928; Meridian, Mississippi, U.S.
- Died: September 1981 (aged 53); New Orleans, Louisiana, U.S.
- Occupations: occultist, religious founder, writer, store owner
- Known for: witchcraft
- Spouse: Albert Toups

Mary Oneida Toups (April 25, 1928 – September 1981) was an American occultist known as the "Witch Queen of New Orleans". Toups was the founder and high priestess of the Religious Order of Witchcraft, which was the first coven to be chartered as an official religious organization in the state of Louisiana. In 1975 she published an instructional occultist book titled Magick High and Low.

== Biography ==
Toups was born on April 25, 1928, in Meridian, Mississippi, to Arthur Hodgin and Mary Ellen Killing. She moved to New Orleans in 1968. Toups was married to Albert Toups, a Cajun who was a high-ranking Freemason and ran a bar on Decatur Street.

On February 2, 1972, she chartered the Religious Order of Witchcraft, the first coven to be registered as an official religious organization within the state of Louisiana. The order, which often gathered at Popp Fountain in City Park, practiced Western ceremonialist magic, not Afro-Caribbean rooted practices like voodoo and hoodoo that are commonly associated with New Orleans. Later in 1972, Toups caught the attention of writer Howard Jacobs, who wrote about her in his column Remoulade, after she publicly defended witchcraft when the practice had been blamed for a murder in Opelousas. She ran two witchcraft shops in the French Quarter, opening her first store on September 1, 1970. Toups also published the occult text Magick High and Low in 1975.

Toups died in September 1981 of stomach cancer.

== Legacy ==
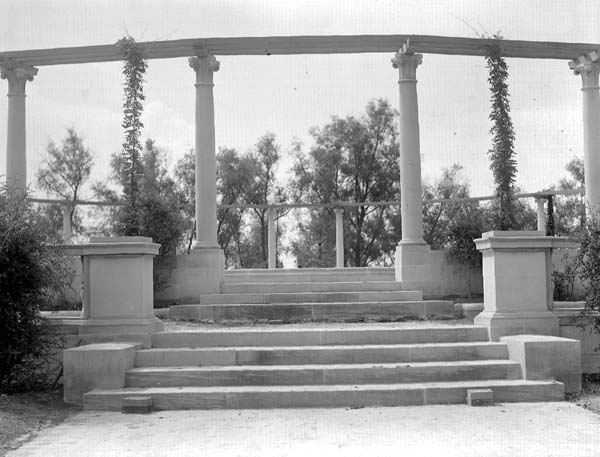
Popp Fountain in City Park, reportedly a meeting place for Toups' coven.

Toups is mentioned in the 1994 memoir Under A Hoodoo Moon: The Life of the Night Tripper. She is also mentioned in the book Real Zombies, the Living Dead, and Creatures of the Apocalypse by Brad Steiger.

On the first episode of American Horror Story: Coven, titled Bitchcraft, Fiona Goode (played by Jessica Lange) references Toups and her coven practicing witchcraft at Popp Fountain in City Park.

== See also ==
- Marie Laveau
