= City Park Big Bass Fishing Rodeo =

Fishing tournament in New Orleans, Louisiana, US

The City Park Big Bass Fishing Rodeo is a fishing tournament founded in New Orleans, Louisiana, in 1946. It is held annually in New Orleans' City Park and is the country's oldest freshwater fishing tournament.

== History ==
The Big Bass Fishing Rodeo was founded by Paul Kalman in 1946. He fished City Park's lagoons and conceived of the idea to hold an annual fishing tournament. The New Orleans Item newspaper sponsored the inaugural event and used a scale borrowed from Schwegmann Bros. Giant Supermarkets original store. The Paul Kalman award is given to the angler 12 years or under who lands the largest bass.

In the 1980s, Joe Courcelle introduced catch-and-release to the rodeo. He built a 400-gallon tank and asked fisherman to turn in their live catch, which were reintroduced to the lagoons. Due to Hurricane Katrina, City Park was unable to hold the Big Bass Rodeo in 2006 and 2007 while the lagoons were restocked. In 2008, the fishing rodeo returned to City Park's lagoons.

In recent years, the "Fishtival" was added to the rodeo. This is a festival surrounding the fishing rodeo which includes live music and wildlife, ecology and conservation educational exhibits.

The current record for Bass Category - Adult was caught by Angler Frank Woolley on Saturday, March 23, at the 75th annual Big Bass Rodeo and Fishtival. The fish weighed an impressive 7.76 lbs. The Adult category catch was particularly noteworthy that morning as Kevin Schilling broke the old record first with a 6.9 lb largemouth, finishing in 2nd place. 3rd place was an beautiful 5.4 lb'er caught by Luke Greer. (https://www.wlf.louisiana.gov/news/75th-annual-big-bass-rodeo-announces-winners)
