= Enrique Alférez =

Mexican-American artist

- Born: May 4, 1901; San Miguel del Mezquital (now Miguel Auza), Mexico
- Died: September 14, 1999 (aged 98); New Orleans, Orleans Parish, Louisiana, United States
- Education: School of the Art Institute of Chicago
- Notable work: Molly Marine Fountain of the Four Winds Symbols of Communication Louisiana at Work and Play
- Style: Art Deco
- Children: Tlaloc S. Alférez
- Website: http://enriquealferez.com/

Enrique Alférez (1901–1999) was a Mexican artist who specialized in sculpting architectural reliefs and the human form.

== Early life and education ==
Born in a rural village in northern Mexico, Alférez was introduced to sculpture by his father, a European-trained woodworker. He ran away at age 12, and was conscripted into the Constitutional Army during the Mexican Revolution. In 1920, he fled his home country and made his way to El Paso, Texas, where he found work as a photographer's assistant. It was here he attended a lecture presented by art teacher Lorado Taft, who was visiting El Paso on an Art Institute of Chicago tour. Seeing potential in the young man, Taft encouraged Alferez to come study under him in Chicago, which he did from 1927 through 1929.

== Career ==
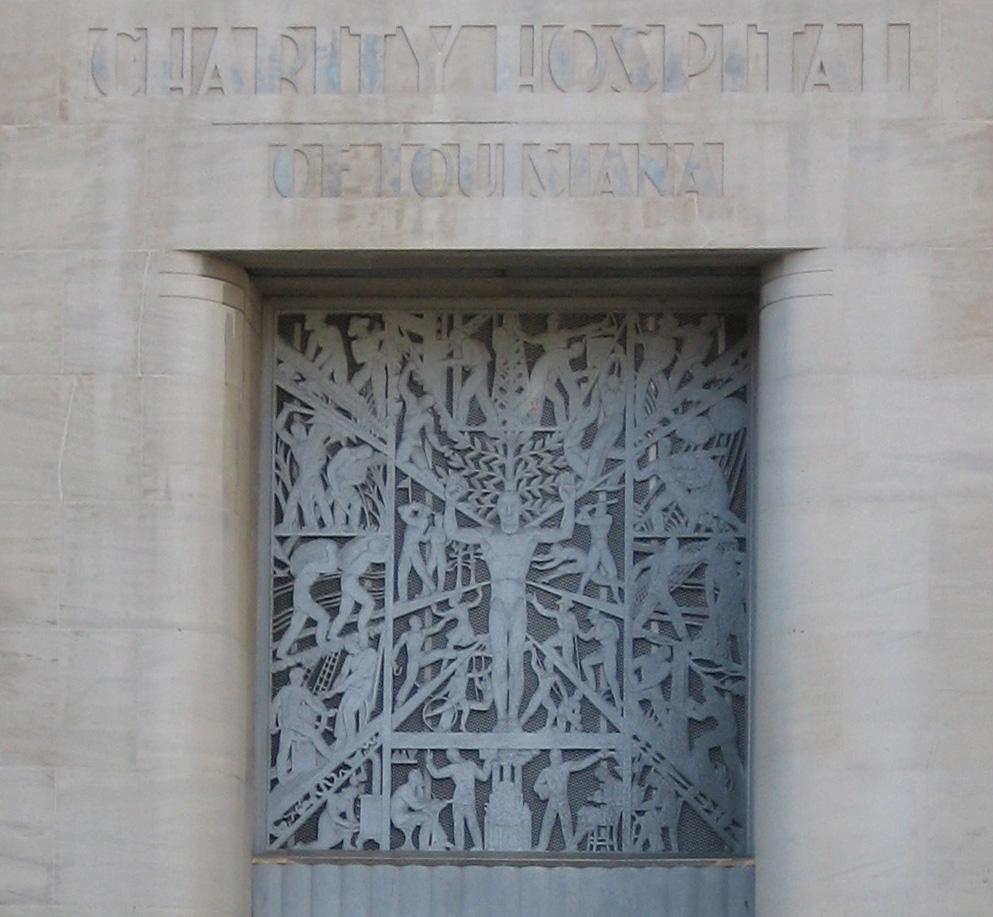
Aluminum grill in the transom of the main entrance of Charity hospital

After completing his education in 1929, he planned to travel back to Mexico, but ran out of money along the way and settled in New Orleans, Louisiana, where he spent much of the rest of his life. He later married an American woman named Margaret, with whom he had a daughter.

His sculptures and reliefs adorn many parks, buildings, and landmarks in the New Orleans Metropolitan Area, many of them commissioned by the Works Progress Administration. Some of the most notable include those in City Park, as well as the "Molly Marine" statue, the first American sculpture to depict a woman in military uniform. His Fountain of the Four Winds at New Orleans Lakefront Airport is a well known local landmark, controversial in the time of its construction due to Alférez's depiction of male nudity. He made reliefs for a number of buildings, including the Charity Hospital Building in New Orleans and the Palmolive Building in Chicago.

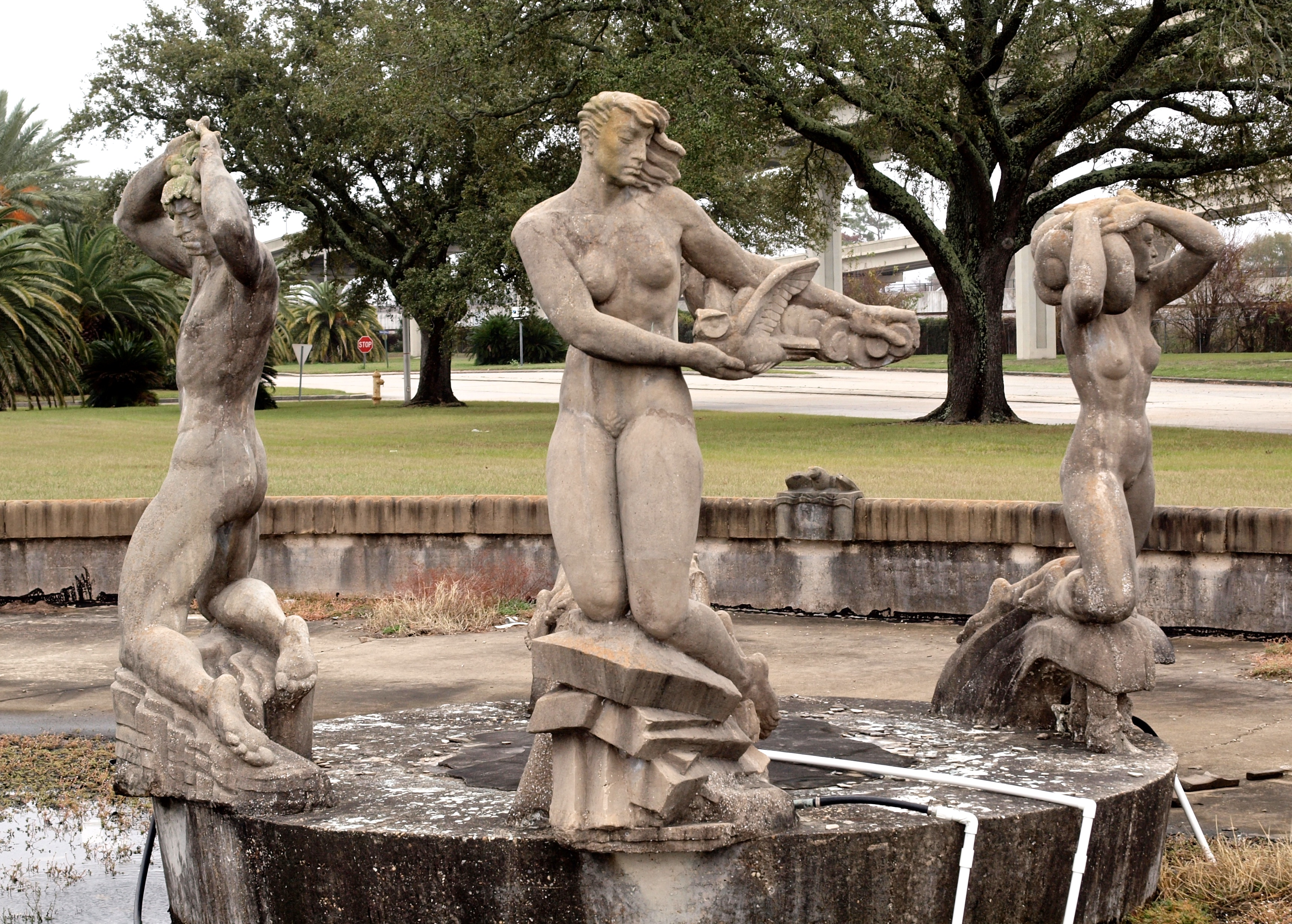
"Fountain of the Four Winds" (1937) at Lakefront Airport

Alférez was not only a sculptor, and actively produced work in other artistic disciplines. Notably, he painted an official portrait of Senator Huey P. Long (who he personally loathed, as he revealed decades later).

Alférez remained active into his later years, both as a working artist and an art teacher. In 1993, he appeared in a PBS American Experience documentary entitled "The Hunt for Pancho Villa".

In the years after Alférez's passing, author Katie Bowler Young began researching his work and went on to publish an extensive biography on his life titled "Enrique Alférez: Sculptor" in 2020 through the Historic New Orleans Collection.

Alférez's influence and work is present throughout New Orleans. The Helis Foundation Enrique Alférez Sculpture Garden is named in his honor and located inside the New Orleans Botanical Garden. The garden is 8,000 sq. ft. and features over 20 of Alférez's sculptures, most of which are owned by The Helis Foundation.
