= Bayou Metairie =

Stranded distributary bayou in southeast Louisiana, with vestiges extant

Coordinates: 29°59′00″N 90°07′15″W

Bayou Metairie was a stranded distributary bayou that was located in present-day New Orleans, Louisiana, USA, and Jefferson Parish, Louisiana, USA, that extended from the area known as River Ridge to Bayou St. John. Bayou Metairie was filled in during the late 19th century and early 20th century although remnants of Bayou Metairie persist.

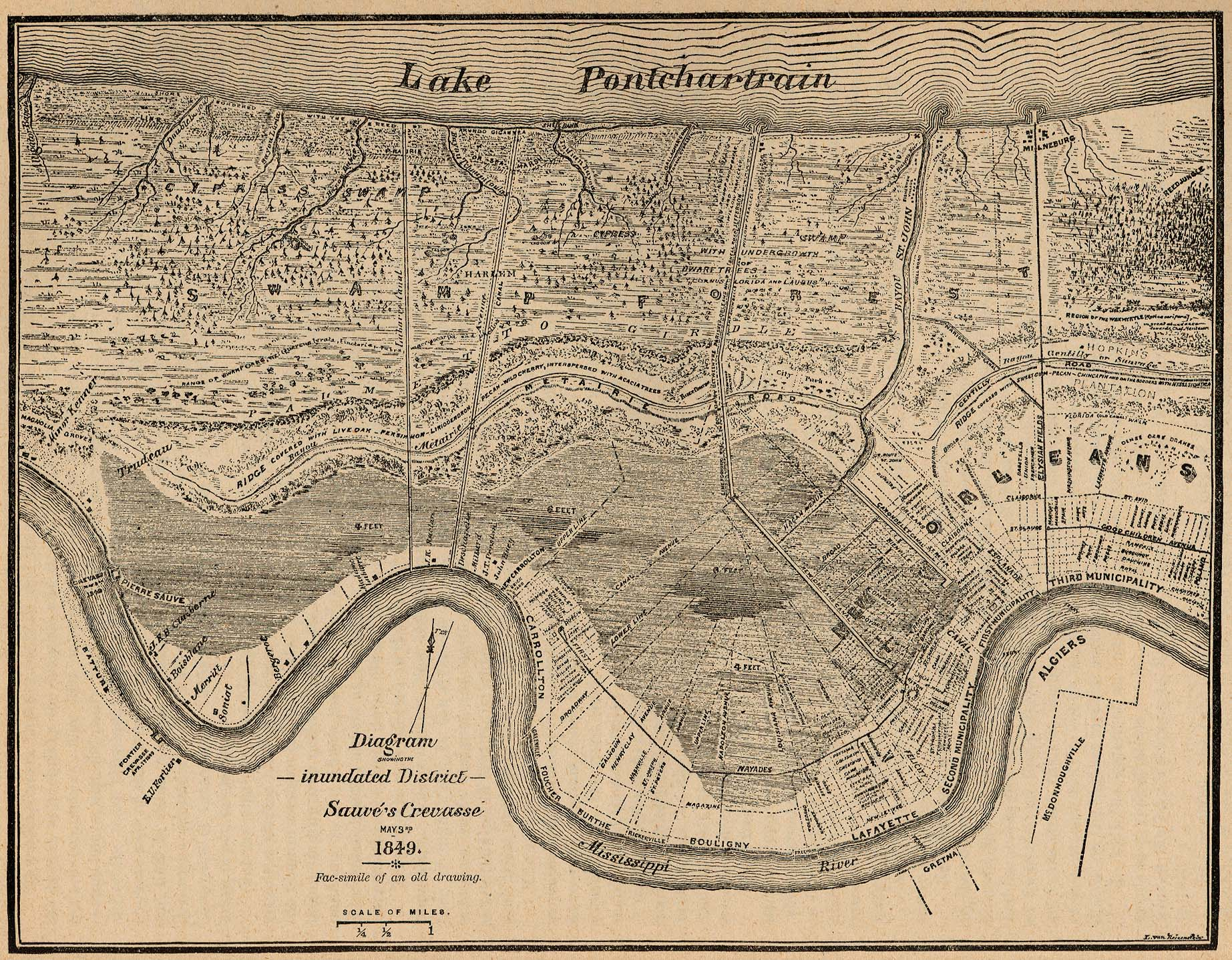
1849 Sauvé's Crevasse map showing east-west flow of Bayou Metairie

The geologic record indicates that the Mississippi River 2600 years ago followed a course that became Bayou Metairie. This flow pattern gave rise to river banks through alluvial deposition in that location. With time, the course of the river shifted to its present day location, leaving behind a stranded waterway that was Bayou Metairie. Its river banks of its past course remained as the long narrow strip of higher ground that is known as the Metairie - Gentilly Ridge. This ridge as it followed Bayou Metairie was as much as a mile wide at its beginning, becoming much narrower as it progressed eastward, with a height of approximately seven feet. Water flow from the Mississippi River into Bayou Metairie was intermittent until approximately the year 1700 when it had ceased completely.

Bayou Metairie meandered 20 miles eastward through present-day Jefferson Parish and Orleans Parish, following a path approximately parallel to the present course of the Mississippi River. Eventually Bayou Metairie developed a northward outlet to Lake Pontchartrain, the outlet becoming known as Bayou St. John. The sections east of Bayou St. John came to be known as Bayou Sauvage and Bayou Gentilly. The locations of these distributaries and the Metairie - Gentilly Ridge can be seen in the 1849 Sauvé's Crevasse map.

Bayou Metairie and the narrow, elevated banks that comprise the Metairie - Gentilly Ridge had long been used by indigenous people in pre-colonial times. Subsequently, the land on the ridge was mostly used for small farms and gardens, being fertile soil on high ground, in centuries past of the region. Only intermittently was Bayou Metairie navigable, and then only by small boats, depending on wind and tide. Small colonial farms were established by 1708, pre-dating the city of New Orleans. In the early history of New Orleans, smugglers and runaway slaves made use of Bayou Metairie and the accompanying ridge.

As urban development continued in the region in the late 19th century and early 20th century, Bayou Metairie was filled in, with only remnants persisting by the early 1900s. Some of the remnants include the area around Dueling Oaks in New Orleans City Park and the lagoons in the lower part of City Park. Early real estate developers promoted the location based on its easy access to New Orleans. The Metairie - Gentilly Ridge, which followed part of the course of Bayou Metairie, is presently occupied by Metairie Road in Jefferson Parish, Louisiana.

Indigenous people in the region referred to Bayou Metairie as "Bayou Tchoupitoulas", while Spanish settlers knew it as "Arroyo de la Alqueria". French settlers referred to the Metairie - Gentilly Ridge as "Chemin de la Métairie".

== Gallery ==
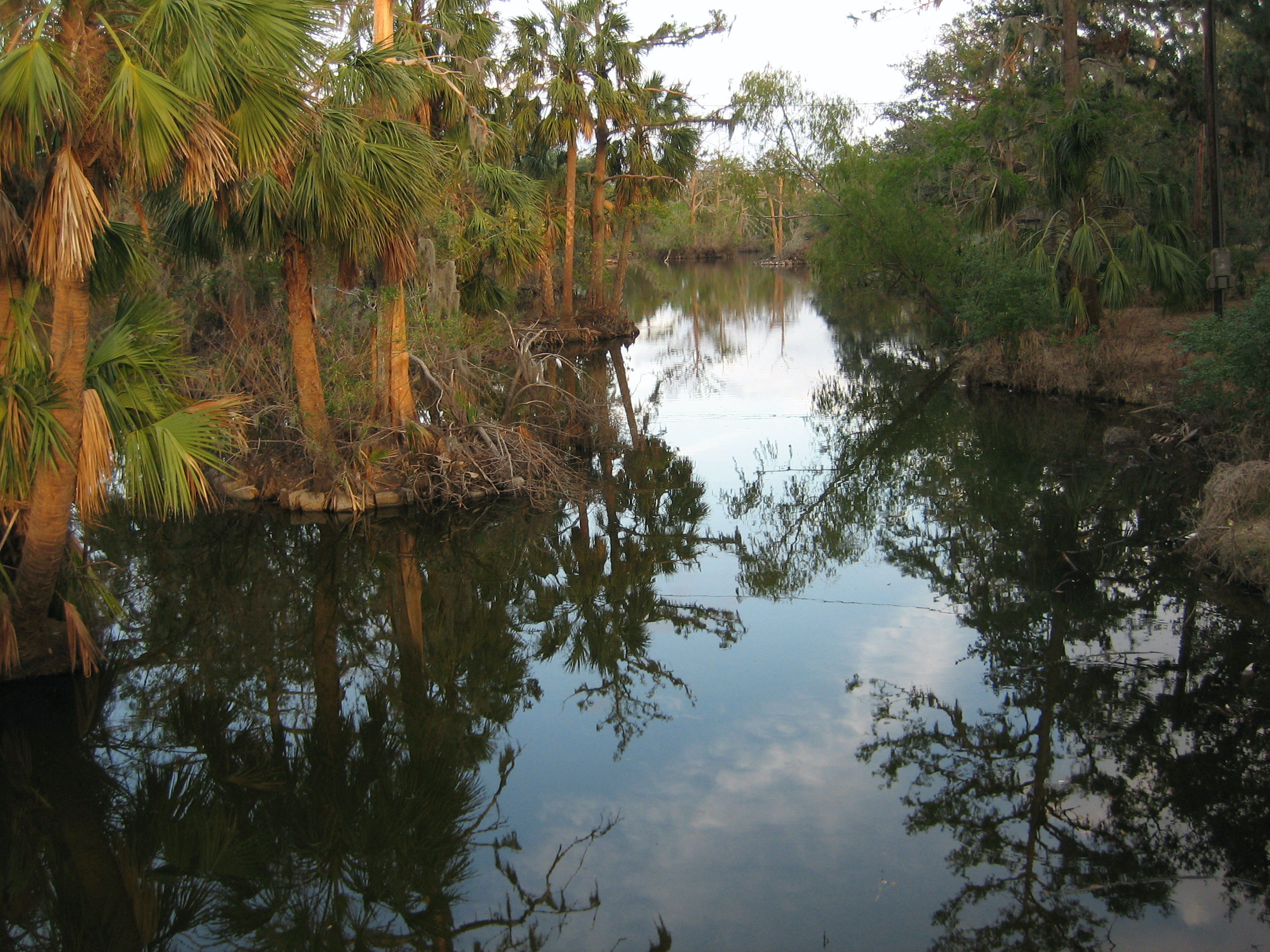
Remnant of Bayou Metairie in New Orleans City Park

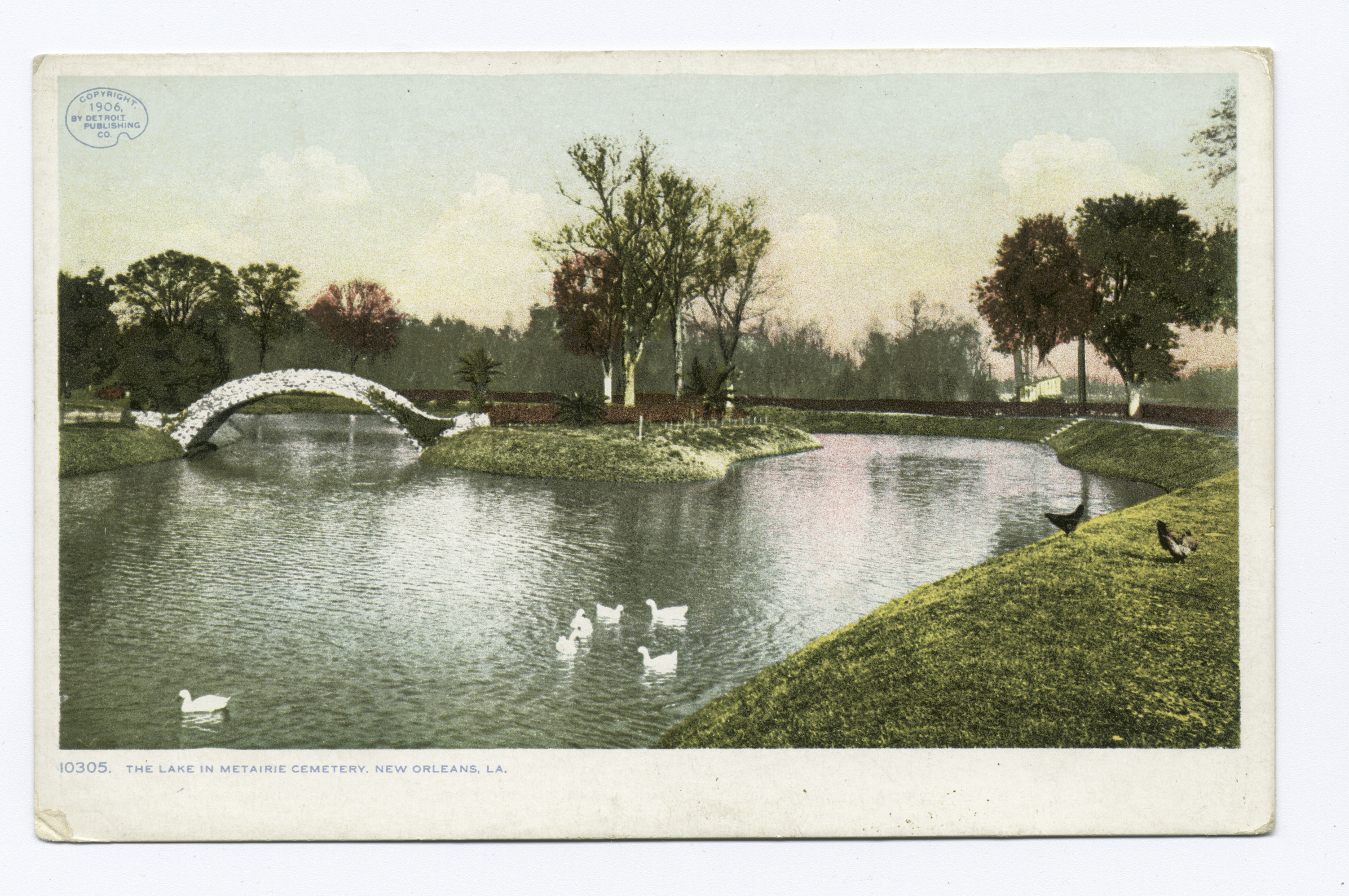
Remnant of Bayou Metairie as "The Lake" at Metairie Cemetery in New Orleans

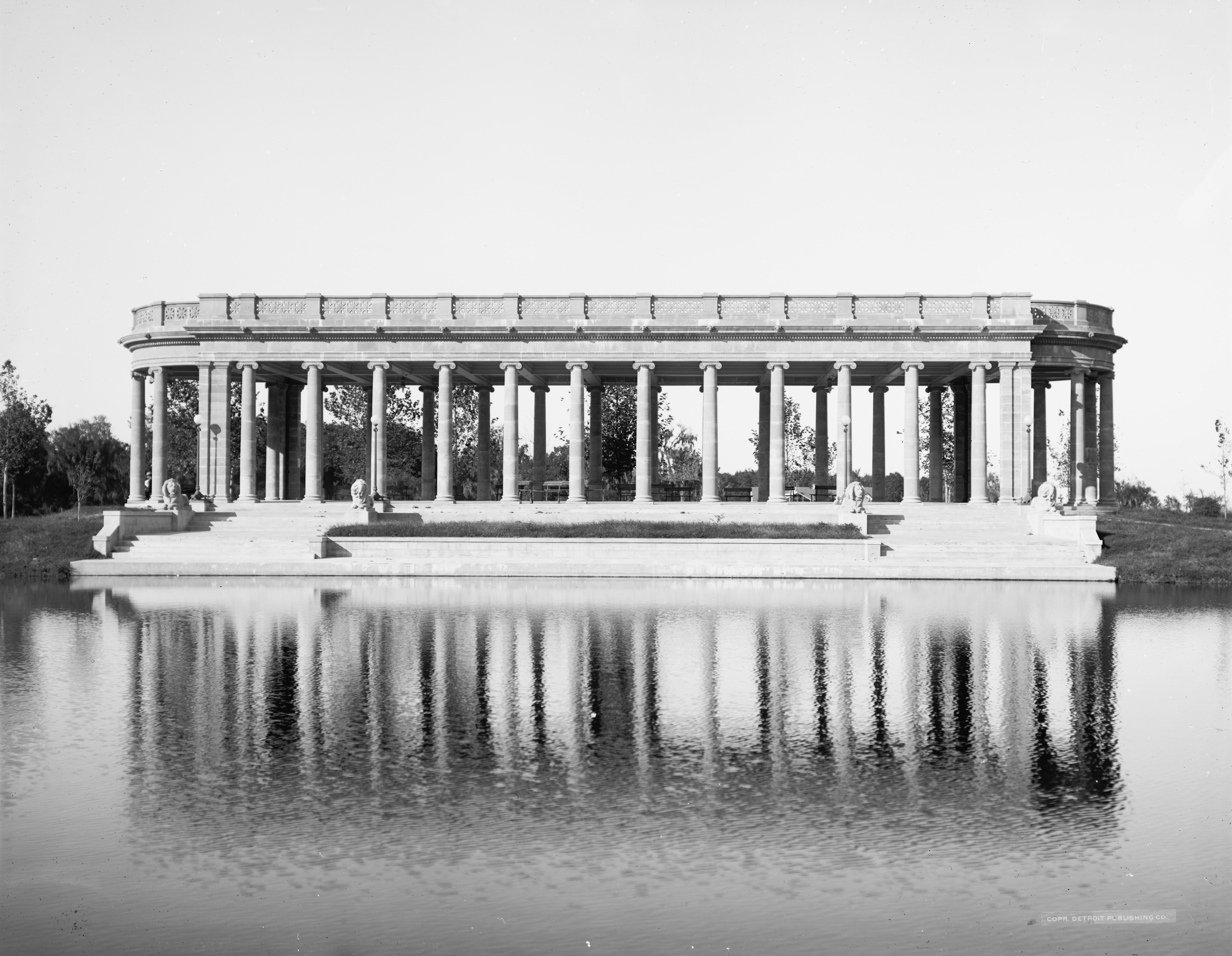
Peristyle at New Orleans City Park at a lagoon which is a remnant of Bayou Metairie
