= City Park (New Orleans) =

Public park in New Orleans, Louisiana, US

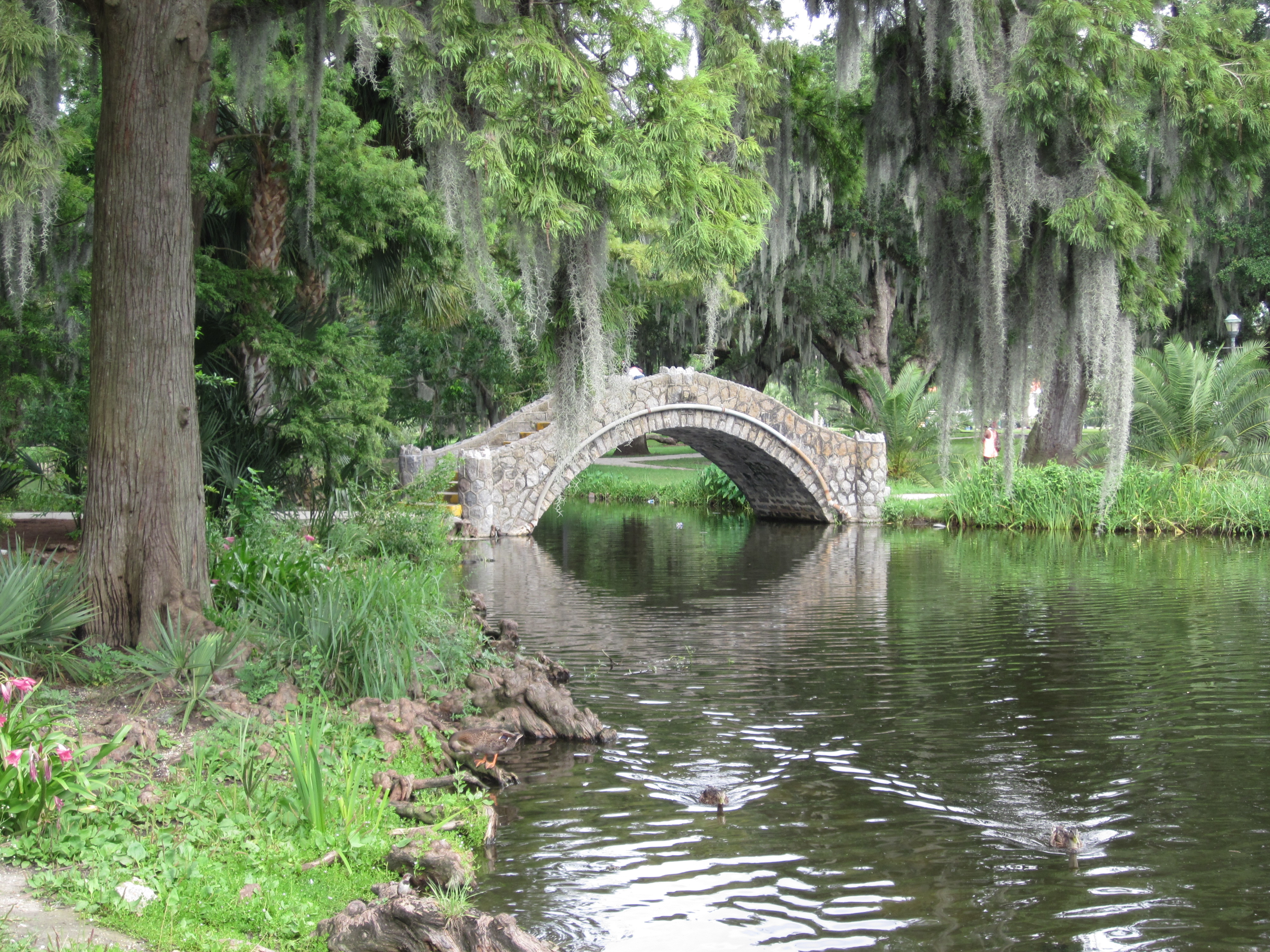
- Stone bridge over a preserved section of an old bayou
- Interactive map of City Park
- Type: Urban park
- Location: New Orleans, Louisiana
- Coordinates: 30°00′06″N 90°05′34″W
- Area: 1,300 acres (5.3 km^{2})
- Created: 1854
- Owner: City of New Orleans
- Operator: City Park Improvement Association
- Visitors: about 5 million annually
- Status: Open all year
- Website: neworleanscitypark.org

City Park, a 1,300-acre (5.3 km^{2}) public park in New Orleans, Louisiana, is the 87th largest and 20th-most-visited urban public park in the United States. City Park is approximately 50% larger than Central Park in New York City, the municipal park recognized by Americans nationwide as the archetypal urban greenspace. Although it is an urban park whose land is owned by the City of New Orleans, it is administered by the City Park Improvement Association, an arm of state government, not by the New Orleans Parks and Parkways Department. City Park is unusual in that it is a largely self-supporting public park, with most of its annual budget derived from self-generated revenue through user fees and donations. In the wake of the enormous damage inflicted upon the park due to Hurricane Katrina, the Louisiana Department of Culture, Recreation and Tourism began to partially subsidize the park's operations.

City Park holds the world's largest collection of mature live oak trees, some older than 600 years in age. The park was founded in 1854, making it the 48th oldest park in the country, and established as the "City Park" in 1891.

== History ==
=== The Dueling Oaks ===
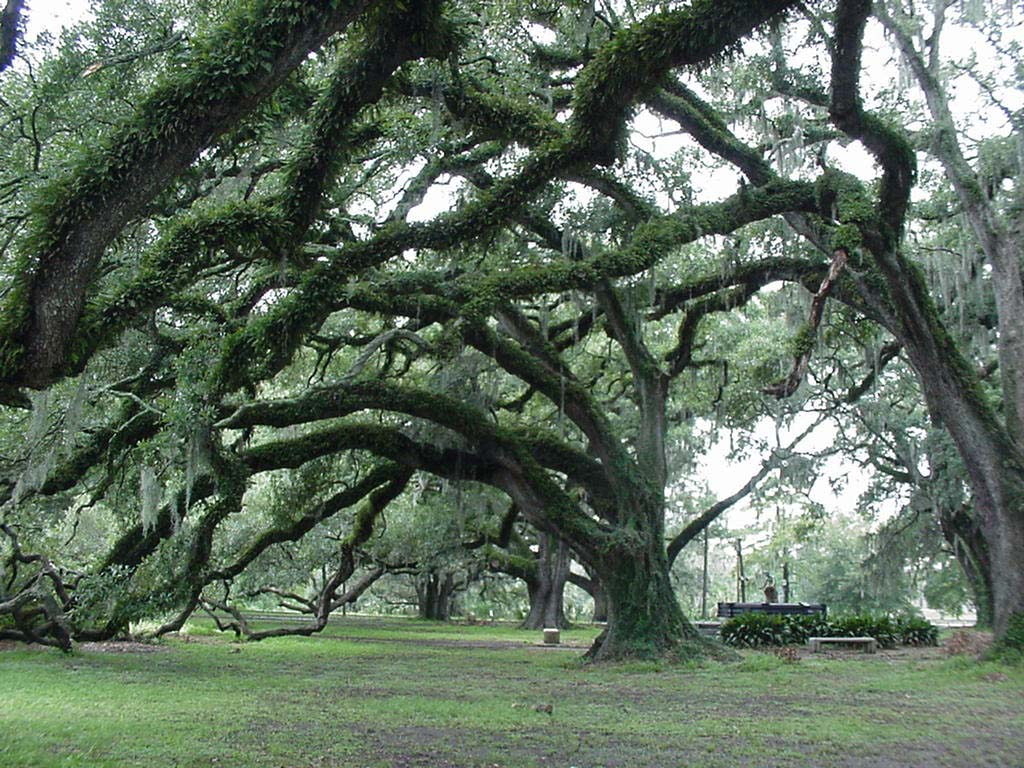
Centuries-old Live Oak trees, located near City Park Avenue in the oldest section of the park.

The park was originally a location used for dueling. In the 1800s, men would defend their pride and honor by dueling each other under the oaks at what is now City Park but then was a normally quiet spot secluded from the rest of the city. Originally, there were two "dueling oaks," but one was lost in a hurricane in 1949.

Some of the city's most notable figures who participated in duels in City Park include Bernard de Marigny, a nobleman and president of the Louisiana Senate in 1822–23. Many of the disputes between parties were either reconciled before the duel or after one party sustained a minor injury. Dueling deaths were reported, however. In 1805, Micajah Green Lewis, Gov. William C.C. Claiborne's private secretary and brother-in-law, was killed by Robert Sterry, a Claiborne opponent. By 1890, dueling was outlawed.

New Orleans City Park lost approximately 2,000 trees after Hurricane Katrina and the federal levee failures, but the Dueling Oak still stands where Dueling Oaks Drive meets Dreyfous Drive between the Sydney and Walda Besthoff Sculpture Garden and the New Orleans Museum of Art, with a small sign in front of it.

=== Park history ===
City Park was established in the mid-19th century on land fronting Metairie Road (now City Park Avenue), along the remains of Bayou Metairie, a former distributary of the Mississippi River. The tract of land, formerly the Allard Plantation, became city property in 1850 through John McDonogh's will and was reserved for park purposes. In 1854, the 4th District Court pronounced the property a public park. The park originally extended 100 acres back from City Park Avenue, as swampland covered most of the landscape between Bayou Metairie and the south shore of Lake Pontchartrain. This area, to the north of the original park, was actually platted for streets by city planners, though none was ever realized. In 1891, the City Park Improvement Association was founded, and the property was officially established as "City Park."

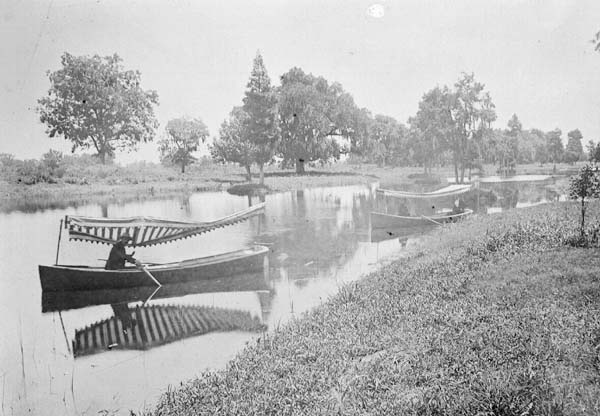
Canoe recreation in City Park Lagoon about 1900

The carousel, originally mule-driven, opened in 1897, and was updated to a mechanical carousel in 1906. The miniature train opened in 1898 and the original golf course was built in 1902. A racetrack opened February 11, 1905, but closed only 3 years later in 1908. In the first two decades of the 20th century, numerous improvements were undertaken by the City Park Improvement Association. The Peristyle was constructed in 1907 and the Isaac Delgado Museum of Art, later renamed the New Orleans Museum of Art, opened in 1911. Two years later, in 1913, the Casino building opened offering refreshments. The Casino building is currently occupied by Café du Monde. The Popp Bandstand was constructed in 1917 and dedicated on July 4. The Irby swimming pool was built in 1924. City Park's governing board also accomplished a number of large land acquisitions, such that the park assumed its current boundaries.

In 1915, the Gen. Beauregard Equestrian Statue was erected at the entrance to City Park. On June 24, 2015, New Orleans Mayor Mitch Landrieu acknowledged the impact of the June 2015 Charleston church shooting, and called for the removal of several city memorials to Confederate slaveholders. On December 17, 2015, the New Orleans City Council voted 6–1 to remove the Gen. Beauregard statue, along with three other historical monuments; the Beauregard statue was removed on May 16, 2017.

In 1919, William McFadden purchased property on the park and built a mansion. In 1949, this mansion began to be used as Christian Brothers School, an all-boys middle school for grades 5–7, and still remains a boys' school today. In 1927, the city extended the park by 900 acres, and the first tennis courts were built in the following year. In 1928, John Philip Sousa performed at the Popp bandstand.

The park was expanded in the 1930s due to a $12 million grant from the Works Progress Administration. A master plan, by Bennett, Parsons & Frost of Chicago was commissioned to guide the development of the greatly enlarged park; this plan was largely implemented in the 1930s by the W.P.A. This included the installation of many sculptures by WPA artist Enrique Alférez, construction of buildings, bridges, roads, and much of the electrical and plumbing infrastructure that were still serving the park when Hurricane Katrina struck in 2005. A formal rose garden was developed, the genesis of today's New Orleans Botanical Garden. The WPA also planted Couterie Forest and constructed Popp Fountain, City Park Stadium, a second 18-hole golf course - home for many years to the New Orleans Open golf tournament - and a golf clubhouse, which was later partially demolished to accommodate I-610.

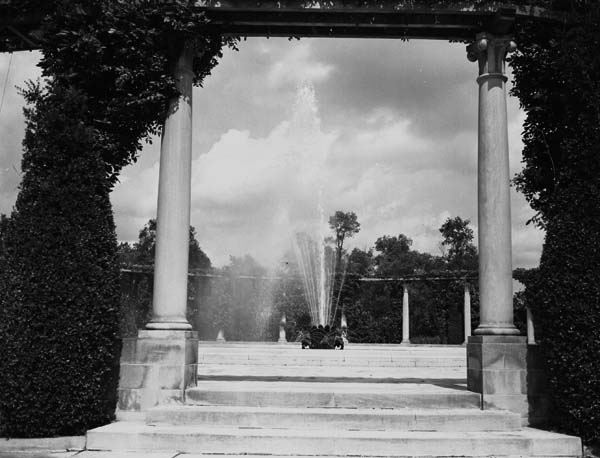
Popp Fountain in 1941

Many events have taken place at Tad Gormley Stadium in City Park. Actress Dorothy Lamour from New Orleans traveled the country selling war bonds, and in 1942, made a stop in her hometown to sell war bonds in Tad Gormley stadium. Bob Hope performed in the stadium in 1944. Roy Rogers and Trigger appeared in the stadium in 1959. Even the Beatles performed in the stadium in 1964, and tickets cost just $5. In 1992, Tad Gormley Stadium was remodeled to host the US Olympic Track & Field Trials.

After World War II, two additional 18-hole golf courses were added, I-610 was constructed through the park, a new golf clubhouse was erected, the Wisner Foundation subsidized the development of a scenic parkway running almost the entire length of Bayou St. John (Wisner Boulevard), and multiple rounds of expansion and improvement occurred involving various park facilities. By the 1970s, City Park featured four 18-hole golf courses, over 50 tennis courts, numerous other athletic fields and facilities, and the newly expanded New Orleans Museum of Art. However, as was the case with many urban parks during this period, City Park began to suffer neglect, the result of insufficient maintenance due to budget cuts. Towards the end of this period the Friends of City Park were formed (1979) to rally support and raise resources for the park.

The first City Park Big Bass Fishing Rodeo took place in the park in 1946. In 1960, 593 fishermen from around the country participated in the rodeo.

Until 1958, two years after Storyland opened, all park amenities, including the playground and Storyland, were restricted to white residents. African American children and families were banned from entering the park.

Throughout the 1970s, Popp Fountain was the meeting place for the Religious Order of Witchcraft, an occultist coven founded by Mary Oneida Toups.

On May 9, 1999, a section of the park near Interstate 610 became the site of the Mother's Day bus crash, the deadliest bus accident in Louisiana history. An eastbound charter motorcoach carrying 43 passengers veered off the highway at milepost 1.6, crashed through a perimeter chain-link fence, and collided into a dirt embankment inside the park grounds. The disaster resulted in 22 passenger fatalities, while the driver and 21 remaining passengers sustained injuries. In May 2026, following a multi-year campaign initiated by filmmaker Royd Anderson and coordination with the City Park Conservancy, a permanent memorial plaque was dedicated near Pan American Stadium.

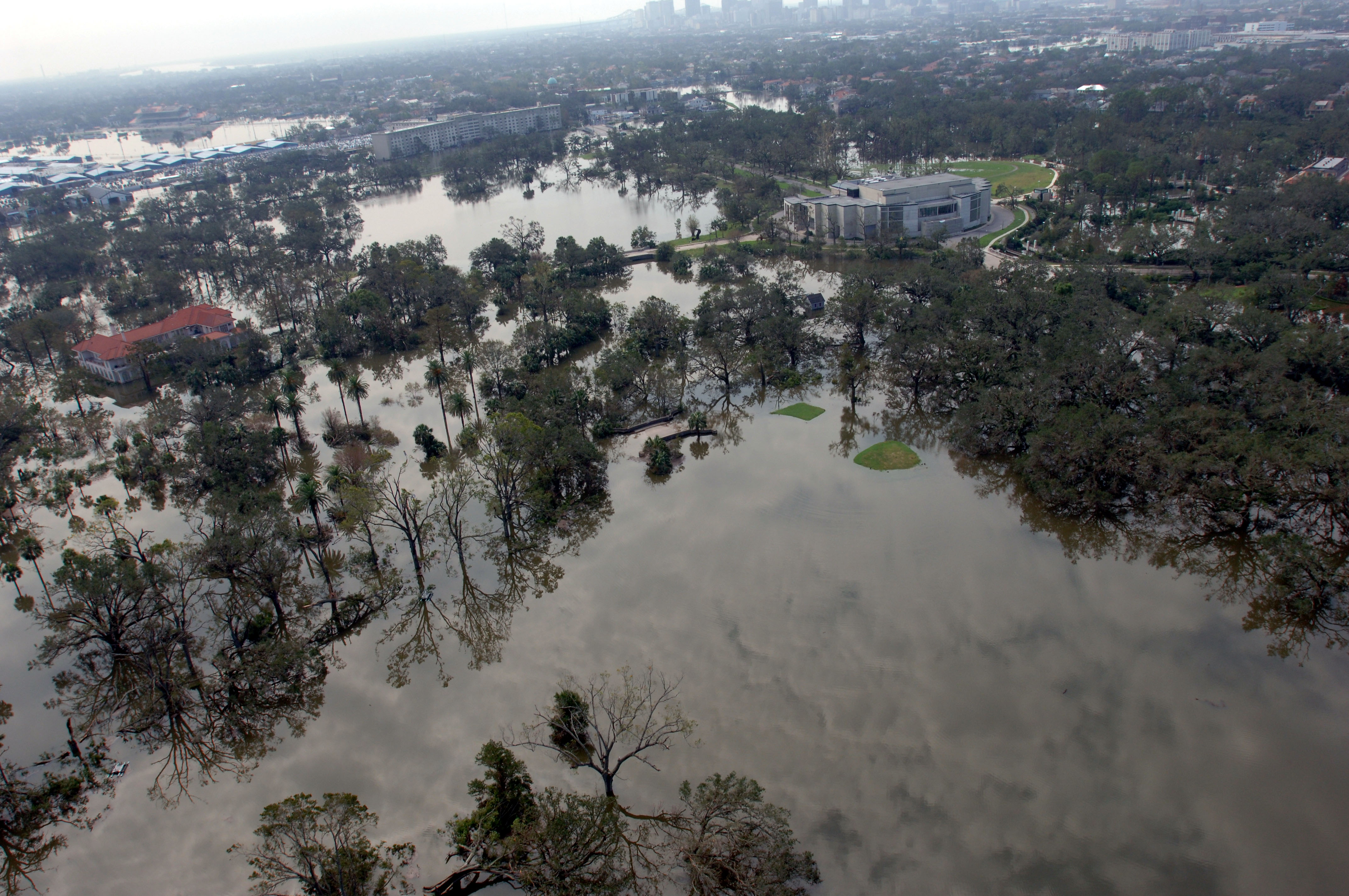
Aerial view from above City Park after Katrina. New Orleans Museum of Art is at center right. New Orleans Fairgrounds can be seen in distance at top left.

Since 1999, City Park has been the venue for the Voodoo Experience, which has become the largest of the live music events held in the park.

Hurricane Katrina in August 2005 did $43 million in damage to the park, with winds toppling an estimated 1,000 trees and damaging many more. The subsequent failure of multiple floodwalls brought about the inundation of much of the city, and 95% of the park was flooded with 1 foot (0.30 m) to 10 feet (3.0 m) of water that remained for two to four weeks, damaging all buildings, amusement rides, maintenance equipment, electrical systems and vehicles, and causing the death of more trees and landscaping - including nearly the entire plant collection in the New Orleans Botanical Garden.

About 75,000 local and national volunteers assisted in repair projects that began in 2005. As of 2017, City Park is administered and being redeveloped according to its 2005 master plan, the existence of which proved invaluable to the effective channeling of rebuilding assistance in the wake of Hurricane Katrina.

The park has recovered since Hurricane Katrina with the facilities having reopened and many new attractions being added, including a water park coming soon and many future plans such as a skate park and an Environmental Education Center. A dedicated bikeway was added between Wisner Boulevard and Bayou St. John for the length of the parkway, another was installed between Bayou St. John and Marconi Drive along the park's northern boundary, and a third was introduced alongside Harrison Avenue. Most recently, a landscaped walk debuted surrounding Big Lake, adjacent to the New Orleans Museum of Art. This new amenity, called for in the park's 2005 master plan, has realized the long-held wish of surrounding neighborhoods for a pedestrian- and bicycle-only scenic walk akin to the popular facility long offered in Audubon Park, Uptown.

== Programs and community engagement ==
City park includes a range of educational and recreational programs that focus on youth engagement, environmental learning, and community access to green space. These programs are part of a broader effort to increase public interaction with nature and support youth development in urban environments.

=== Youth programs ===
City park supports several youth-oriented programs that provide structured outdoor and educational experiences. These include summer camps, after-school programs, and volunteer opportunities that allow children and adolescents to participate in outdoor learning and recreational activities. These programs are designed to increase access to nature and encourage consistent engagement with outdoor environments. In addition to general programming, organizations such as Grow Dat and Loop NOLA also operate within or in connection to city park spaces, offering outdoor education experiences such as canoeing, ropes courses, hiking, and environmental science activities. These programs focus on teamwork, leadership, and confidence building through direct interaction with natural environments.

=== Educational programming and museum learning ===
The Louisiana Children's Museum, located within City Park, provides interactive educational exhibits and programming designed to support early childhood and adolescent learning. The museum focuses on hands-on, experiential learning that encourages creativity, problem-solving, and exploration. Recent expansions have included programming and exhibit development aimed at older children and tweens, helping extend educational engagement beyond early childhood. These experiences complement other nature-based learning opportunities within the park by connecting environmental education with interactive learning spaces.

=== Recreation and wellness ===
City park provides a wide range of recreational spaces, including walking paths, playgrounds, sports facilities, and open green areas. Research on urban parks suggests that access to these types of environments is associated with improved mental health, reduced stress, and increased physical activity. These spaces allow both youth and adults to engage in physical activity and social interaction while spending time in natural settings.

=== Accessibility and community access ===
City park programs are designed to be accessible to all types of visitors. Many programs offer free or low-cost participation options, and the park includes features that support accessibility for individuals of all ages and abilities. This contributes to the park's role as a community resource that promotes equitable access to natural and educational spaces within the city.

== Facilities ==
=== Athletic facilities ===
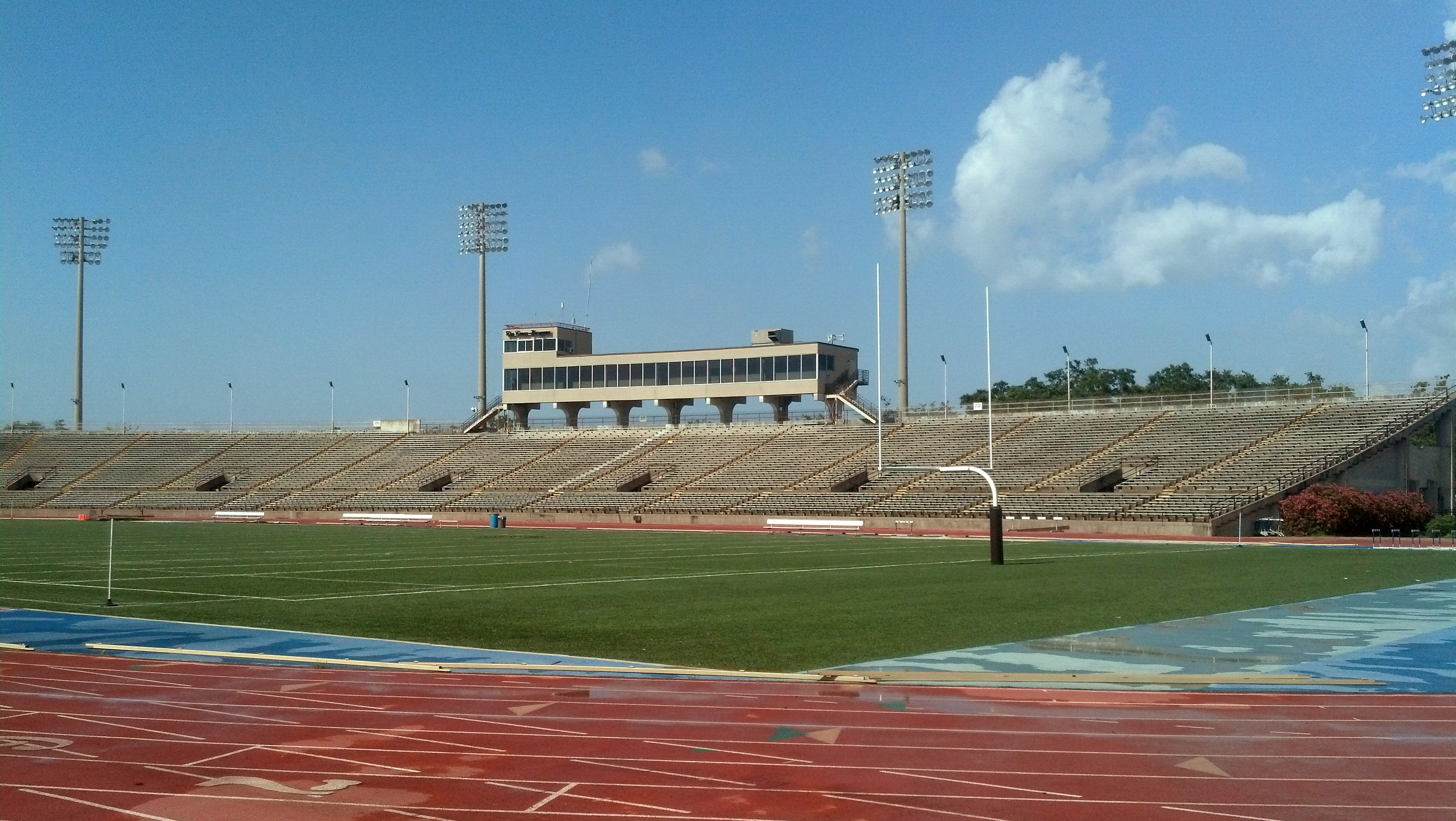
Tad Gormley Stadium

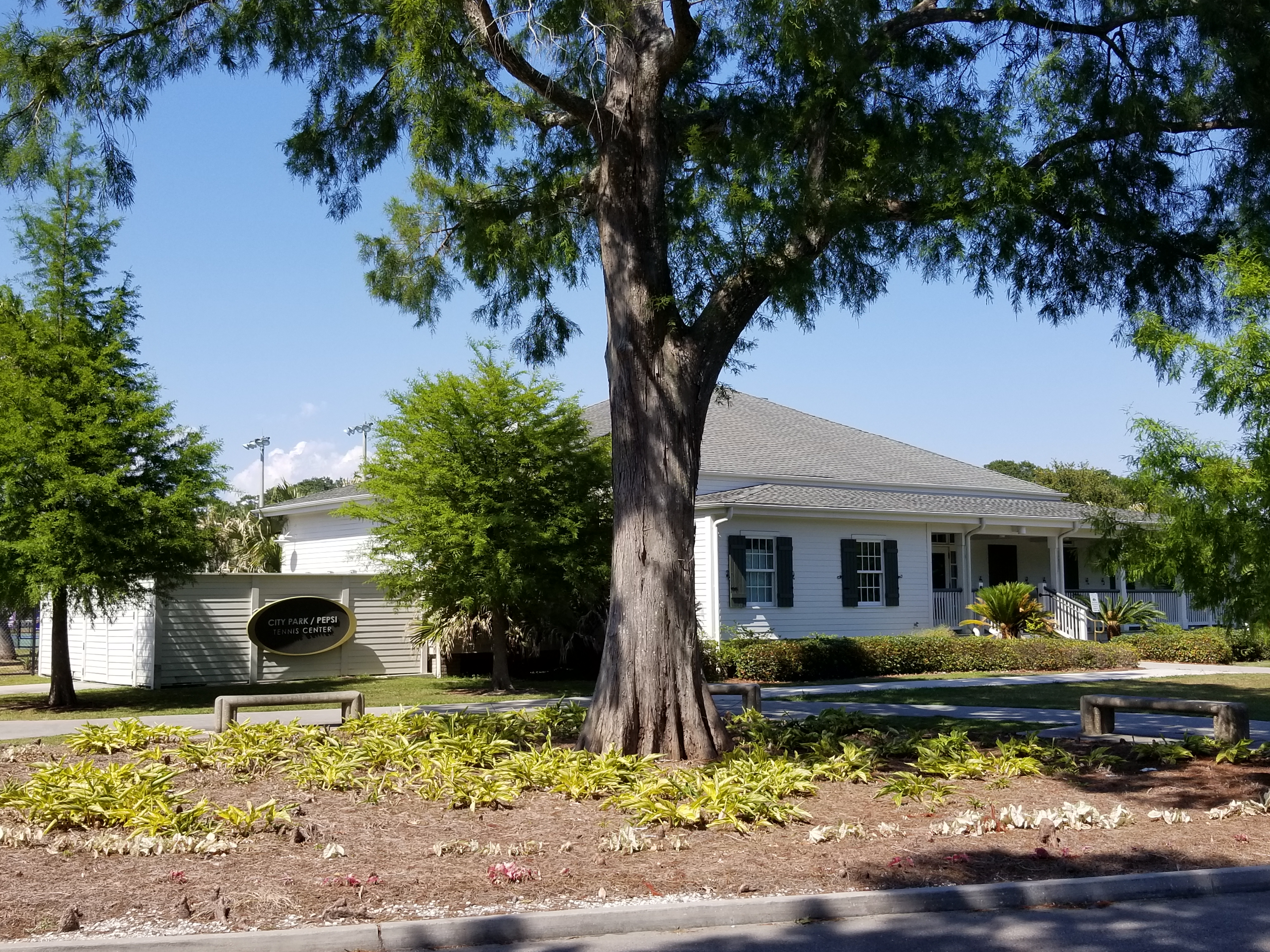
City Park Tennis Center

- City Park Cross Country Course
- City Park Disc Golf Course
- City Park Driving Range
- City Park Golf Courses
- City Park/Pepsi Tennis Center
- City Park Practice Track
- City Park Rugby Pitch
- City Putt
- Lagoon Soccer Fields
- Matt Savoie Soccer Complex
- Pan American Stadium
- Quadruplex (Softball)
- Rotary Baseball Field
- Scout Island Athletic Fields (Lacrosse)
- Tad Gormley Stadium

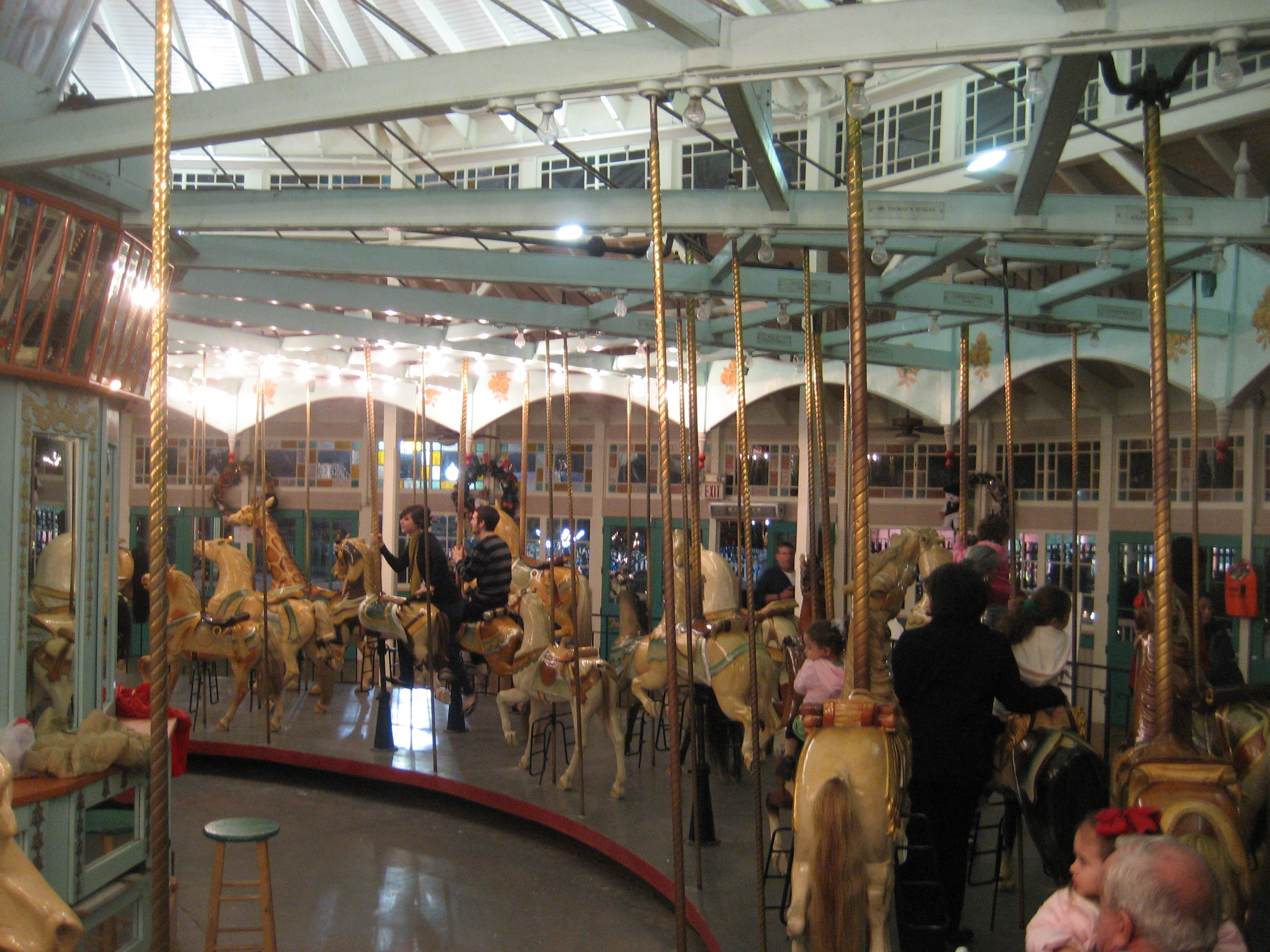
Carousel in Carousel Gardens Amusement Park

=== Attractions and recreation ===
- Bike and Boat Rentals
- Carousel Gardens Amusement Park
- Celebration in the Oaks
- Christian Brothers School
- City Park Birding Corridor
- Couturie Forest: this 60-acre forest is made up of eight distinct ecosystems and is home to New Orleans' highest point of elevation: Laborde Mountain. The entrance to the forest is on Harrison Avenue.
- Dog Park
- Festival Grounds
- Fishing

Wildflowers in City Park

- Gift Shop and Welcome Center
- Gondola Rides
- Goldring/Woldenberg Great Lawn
- Helis Foundation Enrique Alférez Sculpture Garden
- Historic Structures
- Horse Stables
- Louisiana Children's Museum
- New Orleans Botanical Garden
- New Orleans Museum of Art, considered one of the finest art museums in the South
- Storyland

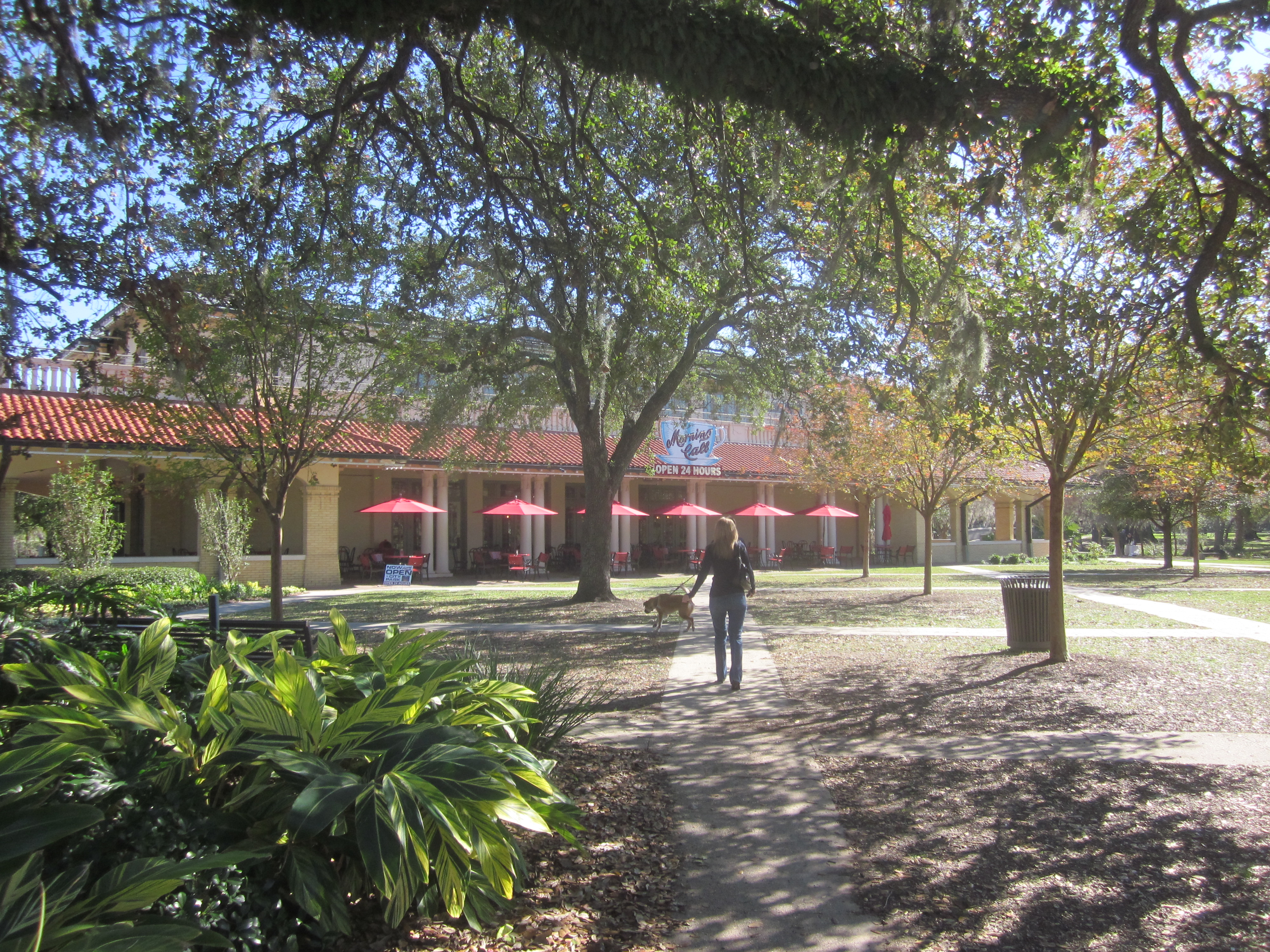
Morning Call Cafe

- Sydney and Walda Besthoff Sculpture Garden
- Trails: Zemurray Trail, Couturie Trail, Scout Island Trail, and bike paths
- Water Park
- Weddings & Catering
- Wildflower fields

=== Dining ===
- Ralph's on the Park
- Cafe Du Monde
- Parker's Café
- Parker's Pizza
