= 1957 Texas Southern Tigers football team =

American college football season

1957 Texas Southern Tigers football

Prairie View Bowl, T 6–6 vs. Prairie View A&M
- Conference: Southwestern Athletic Conference
- Record: 7–3–1 (4–2 SWAC)
- Head coach: Alexander Durley (9th season)
- Home stadium: Public School Stadium

1957 Southwestern Athletic Conference football standings
| | Conf. | | | | | Overall |
| Team | W | | L | | T | W | | L | | T |
|---|---|---|---|---|---|---|---|---|---|---|
| Wiley $ | 6 | – | 0 | – | 0 | 10 | – | 0 | – | 1 |
| Texas Southern | 4 | – | 2 | – | 0 | 7 | – | 3 | – | 1 |
| Prairie View A&M | 4 | – | 2 | – | 0 | 6 | – | 3 | – | 1 |
| Southern | 4 | – | 2 | – | 0 | 6 | – | 4 | – | 0 |
| Arkansas AM&N | 2 | – | 4 | – | 0 | 3 | – | 6 | – | 0 |
| Texas College | 1 | – | 5 | – | 0 | 4 | – | 5 | – | 0 |
| Langston | 0 | – | 6 | – | 0 | 0 | – | 9 | – | 0 |
$ – Conference champion

The 1957 Texas Southern Tigers football team was an American football team that represented Texas Southern University as a member of the Southwestern Athletic Conference (SWAC) during the 1957 college football season. Led by ninth-year head coach Alexander Durley, the Tigers compiled an overall record of 7–3–1, with a mark of 4–2 in conference play, and finished tied for second in the SWAC.

== Schedule ==
| Date | Opponent | Site | Result | Attendance | Source |
|---|---|---|---|---|---|
| September 28 | at Southern | Municipal Stadium; Baton Rouge, LA | W 19–6 | | |
| October 6 | at Wiley | Wildcat Stadium; Marshall, TX | L 6–12 | 3,000 | |
| October 14 | vs. Prairie View A&M | Cotton Bowl; Dallas, TX (rivalry) | L 6–7 | | |
| October 19 | Texas College | Public School Stadium; Houston, TX | W 39–20 | | |
| October 26 | at Lincoln (MO)* | Public School Stadium; Jefferson City, MO | L 13–33 | | |
| November 2 | vs. Langston | Farrington Field; Fort Worth, TX | W 39–18 | 3,500 | |
| November 9 | Jackson State* | Public School Stadium; Houston, TX | W 23–7 | | |
| November 16 | Grambling* | Public School Stadium; Houston, TX | W 59–14 | | |
| November 23 | Arkansas AM&N | Public School Stadium; Houston, TX | W 13–0 | | |
| November 30 | at Mississippi Vocational* | Itta Bena, MS | W 57–6 | | |
| January 1, 1958 | vs. Prairie View A&M* | Public School Stadium; Houston, TX (Prairie View Bowl) | T 6–6 | | |
*Non-conference game
