= 1957 Texas College Steers football team =

American college football season

1957 Texas College Steers football
- Conference: Southwestern Athletic Conference
- Record: 4–5 (1–5 SWAC)
- Head coach: Bo McMichael (1st season)
- Home stadium: Steer Stadium

1957 Southwestern Athletic Conference football standings
	Conf.					Overall
Team	W		L		T	W		L		T
Wiley $	6	–	0	–	0	10	–	0	–	1
Texas Southern	4	–	2	–	0	7	–	3	–	1
Prairie View A&M	4	–	2	–	0	6	–	3	–	1
Southern	4	–	2	–	0	6	–	4	–	0
Arkansas AM&N	2	–	4	–	0	3	–	6	–	0
Texas College	1	–	5	–	0	4	–	5	–	0
Langston	0	–	6	–	0	0	–	9	–	0
$ – Conference champion

The 1957 Texas College Steers football team represented Texas College as a member of the Southwestern Athletic Conference (SWAC) during the 1957 college football season. Led by first-year head coach Bo McMichael, the Steers compiled an overall record of 4–5 and a mark of 1–5 in conference play, and finished sixth in the SWAC.

== Schedule ==
Date	Opponent	Site	Result	Source
September 28	Paul Quinn*	Steer Stadium; Tyler, TX	W 19–6	
October 5	at Arkansas AM&N	Pumphrey Stadium; Pine Bluff, AR	L 6–15	
October 12	Langston	Steer Stadium; Tyler, TX	W 26–6	
October 19	at Texas Southern	Public School Stadium; Houston, TX	L 20–39	
October 27	at Dillard*	Alumni Stadium; New Orleans, LA	W 26–6	
November 2	at Southern	Municipal Stadium; Baton Rouge, LA	L 7–48	
November 9	Prairie View A&M	Steer Stadium; Tyler, TX	L 13–20	
November 16	Bishop*	Steer Stadium; Tyler, TX	W 26–6	
November 28	at Wiley	Wiley Field; Marshall, TX	L 20–41	
*Non-conference game
