= 1957 Tennessee A&I Tigers football team =

American college football season

1957 Tennessee A&I Tigers football

MWAA co-champion
- Conference: Midwest Athletic Association
- Record: 5–0–1 (3–0 MWAA)
- Head coach: Howard C. Gentry (3rd season)
- Home stadium: Hale Stadium

1957 Midwest Athletic Association football standings
	Conf.					Overall
Team	W		L		T	W		L		T
No. 2 Tennessee A&I +	3	–	0	–	0	5	–	0	–	1
No. 22 Jackson State +	2	–	0	–	0	6	–	2	–	0
No. 5 Lincoln (MO)	2	–	1	–	0	8	–	1	–	0
Kentucky State	1	–	3	–	0	3	–	6	–	0
Grambling	0	–	1	–	0	4	–	4	–	0
Central State (OH)	0	–	3	–	0	4	–	4	–	1
+ – Conference co-champions; Rankings from Pittsburgh Courier

The 1957 Tennessee A&I Tigers football team represented Tennessee Agricultural & Industrial State College (now known as Tennessee State University) as a member of the Midwest Athletic Association (MWAA) during the 1957 college football season. Led by third-year head coach Howard C. Gentry, the Tigers compiled an overall record of 5–0–1, with a 3–0 conference record, and finished as MWAA co-champion.

== Schedule ==
Date	Opponent	Site	Result	Attendance	Source
September 28	North Carolina A&T*	Hale Stadium; Nashville, TN	T 6–6	3,000	
October 5	at Langston*	Anderson Stadium; Langston, OK	Canceled		
October 11	at Grambling	Tiger Stadium; Grambling, LA	Canceled		
October 26	Central State (OH)	Hale Stadium; Nashville, TN	W 45–7	2,500	
November 9	at Southern*	Municipal Stadium; Baton Rouge, LA	W 33–14		
November 16	Prairie View A&M*	Hale Stadium; Nashville, TN	W 32–7		
November 23	at Lincoln (MO)	Lincoln Field; Jefferson City, MO	W 26–6		
November 28	Kentucky State	Hale Stadium; Nashville, TN	W 38–0		
*Non-conference game
