= 1955 Wiley Wildcats football team =

American college football season

1955 Wiley Wildcats football
- Conference: Southwestern Athletic Conference
- Record: 3–7 (2–5 SWAC)
- Head coach: Alva Tabor (2nd season)
- Home stadium: Wildcat Stadium

1955 Southwestern Athletic Conference football standings
	Conf.					Overall
Team	W		L		T	W		L		T
No. 5 Southern $	6	–	1	–	0	7	–	2	–	1
No. 10 Prairie View A&M	5	–	1	–	1	8	–	2	–	1
No. 8 Texas Southern	5	–	1	–	1	7	–	2	–	1
No. 6 Langston	4	–	1	–	2	6	–	1	–	2
Texas College	2	–	5	–	0	3	–	6	–	0
Wiley	2	–	5	–	0	3	–	7	–	0
Arkansas AM&N	2	–	5	–	0	2	–	8	–	0
Bishop	0	–	7	–	0	0	–	10	–	0
$ – Conference champion; Rankings from the Pittsburgh Courier.

The 1955 Wiley Wildcats football team represented Wiley College as a member of the Southwestern Athletic Conference (SWAC) during the 1955 college football season. In their second and final season under head coach Alva Tabor, the Wildcats compiled an overall record of 3–7 with a mark of 2–5 in conference play, placing in a three-way tie for fifth in the SWAC.

== Schedule ==
Date	Time	Opponent	Site	Result	Attendance	Source
September 24		Dillard*	Marshall, TX	W 15–0	2,000	
October 1	2:00 p.m.	at Texas Southern	Public School Stadium; Houston, TX	L 8–25		
October 8		at Arkansas AM&N	Pine Bluff, AR	L 12–26		
October 17		vs. Prairie View A&M	Cotton Bowl; Dallas, TX (State Fair Classic)	L 7–34		
October 24		vs. Grambling*	State Fair Stadium; Shreveport, LA	L 0–20		
October 29	8:00 p.m.	Bishop	Wildcat Stadium; Marshall, TX	W 67–0		
November 5	2:00 p.m.	at Langston	Anderson Field; Langston, OK	L 0–6		
November 12		at Southern	Memorial Stadium; Baton Rouge, LA	L 6–16		
November 19		Jackson*^{†}	Marshall, TX	L 19–25		
November 24	2:00 p.m.	Texas College	Wildcat Stadium; Marshall, TX	W 19–7		
*Non-conference game; ^{†}Homecoming; All times are in Central time
