= 1955 Texas College Steers football team =

American college football season

1955 Texas College Steers football
- Conference: Southwestern Athletic Conference
- Record: 3–6 (2–4 SWAC)
- Head coach: Vincent M. Gaines (1st season)
- Home stadium: Steer Stadium

1955 Southwestern Athletic Conference football standings
	Conf.					Overall
Team	W		L		T	W		L		T
No. 5 Southern $	6	–	1	–	0	7	–	2	–	1
No. 10 Prairie View A&M	5	–	1	–	1	8	–	2	–	1
No. 8 Texas Southern	5	–	1	–	1	7	–	2	–	1
No. 6 Langston	4	–	1	–	2	6	–	1	–	2
Texas College	2	–	5	–	0	3	–	6	–	0
Wiley	2	–	5	–	0	3	–	7	–	0
Arkansas AM&N	2	–	5	–	0	2	–	8	–	0
Bishop	0	–	7	–	0	0	–	10	–	0
$ – Conference champion; Rankings from the Pittsburgh Courier.

The 1955 Texas College Steers football team represented Texas College as a member of the Southwestern Athletic Conference (SWAC) during the 1955 college football season. In their first season under head coach Vincent M. Gaines, the Steers compiled an overall record of 3–6 with a mark of 2–5 in conference play, placing in a three-way tie for fifth in the SWAC.

Gaines, who previously coached at Bishop College, succeeded Fred T. Long, who was fired after having coached the team since 1949. Texas College was originally scheduled to open the season against Florida A&M, but the game was cancelled after Long was fired.

== Schedule ==
Date	Time	Opponent	Site	Result	Source
September 24		Paul Quinn*	Tyler, TX	W 7–0	
October 1		Arkansas AM&N	Pine Bluff, AR	W 6–0	
October 8		Langston	Steer Stadium; Tyler, TX	L 0–7	
October 15	2:00 p.m.	at Texas Southern	Public School Stadium; Houston, TX	L 21–33	
October 22		at Alcorn A&M*	Alcorn, MS	L 0–15	
October 29	2:00 p.m.	at Southern	Memorial Stadium; Baton Rouge, LA	L 14–38	
November 5	2:00 p.m.	Prairie View A&M	Steer Stadium; Tyler, TX	L 13–34	
November 12		Bishop	Tyler, TX	W 47–7	
November 24	2:00 p.m.	Wiley	Wildcat Stadium; Marshall, TX	L 7–19	
*Non-conference game; All times are in Central time
