= 1955 Texas Southern Tigers football team =

American college football season

1955 Texas Southern Tigers football
- Conference: Southwestern Athletic Conference
- Record: 7–2–1 (5–1–1 SWAC)
- Head coach: Alexander Durley (7th season)
- Home stadium: Public School Stadium

1955 Southwestern Athletic Conference football standings
	Conf.					Overall
Team	W		L		T	W		L		T
No. 5 Southern $	6	–	1	–	0	7	–	2	–	1
No. 10 Prairie View A&M	5	–	1	–	1	8	–	2	–	1
No. 8 Texas Southern	5	–	1	–	1	7	–	2	–	1
No. 6 Langston	4	–	1	–	2	6	–	1	–	2
Texas College	2	–	5	–	0	3	–	6	–	0
Wiley	2	–	5	–	0	3	–	7	–	0
Arkansas AM&N	2	–	5	–	0	2	–	8	–	0
Bishop	0	–	7	–	0	0	–	10	–	0
$ – Conference champion; Rankings from the Pittsburgh Courier.

The 1955 Texas Southern Tigers football team represented Texas Southern University as a member of the Southwestern Athletic Conference (SWAC) during the 1955 college football season. In their seventh season under head coach Alexander Durley, the Tigers compiled an overall record of 7–2–1 with a mark of 5–1–1 in conference play, tying for second place in the SWAC.

== Schedule ==
Date	Time	Opponent	Site	Result	Attendance	Source
September 24	8:00 p.m.	at Southern	Memorial Stadium; Baton Rouge, LA	L 21–33		
October 1		Wiley	Public School Stadium; Houston, TX	W 25–8		
October 8		Prairie View A&M	Public School Stadium; Houston, TX (rivalry)	W 27–18	14,402	
October 15	2:00 p.m.	Texas College^{†}	Public School Stadium; Houston, TX	W 33–21		
October 22		at Lincoln (MO)*	Jefferson City, MO	W 20–17	3,000	
October 29	2:00 p.m.	vs. Langston	Farrington Field; Fort Worth, TX	T 20–20	3,000	
November 5		at Tennessee A&I*	Hale Stadium; Nashville, TN	L 14–38	3,500	
November 12		at Paul Quinn*	Paul Quinn Stadium; Waco, TX	W 42–0		
November 19		at Bishop	Dallas, TX	W 84–0		
November 26		Arkansas AM&N	Houston, TX	W 64–0		
*Non-conference game; ^{†}Homecoming; All times are in Central time
