= Howard Gentry =

Howard Gentry may refer to:

- Howard Scott Gentry (1903–1993), American botanist
- Howard C. Gentry, head college football coach for the Tennessee State University Tigers, 1955–1960
