= 1957 Arkansas AM&N Golden Lions football team =

American college football season

1957 Arkansas AM&N Golden Lions football
- Conference: Southwestern Athletic Conference
- Record: 3–6 (2–4 SWAC)
- Head coach: Charles Spearman (1st season)
- Home stadium: Pumphrey Stadium

1957 Southwestern Athletic Conference football standings
	Conf.					Overall
Team	W		L		T	W		L		T
Wiley $	6	–	0	–	0	10	–	0	–	1
Texas Southern	4	–	2	–	0	7	–	3	–	1
Prairie View A&M	4	–	2	–	0	6	–	3	–	1
Southern	4	–	2	–	0	6	–	4	–	0
Arkansas AM&N	2	–	4	–	0	3	–	6	–	0
Texas College	1	–	5	–	0	4	–	5	–	0
Langston	0	–	6	–	0	0	–	9	–	0
$ – Conference champion

The 1957 Arkansas AM&N Golden Lions football team represented the Arkansas Agricultural, Mechanical and Normal College (now known as the University of Arkansas at Pine Bluff) as a member of the Southwestern Athletic Conference (SWAC) during the 1957 college football season. Led by first-year head coach Charles Spearman, the Golden Lions compiled an overall record of 3–6, with a conference record of 2–4, and finished fifth in the SWAC.

== Schedule ==
Date	Opponent	Site	Result	Source
September 28	Lincoln (MO)*	Pumphrey Stadium; Pine Bluff, AR	L 0–14	
October 5	Texas College	Pumphrey Stadium; Pine Bluff, AR	W 15–6	
October 12	Wiley	Pumphrey Stadium; Pine Bluff, AR	L 0–20	
October 19	at Southern	Municipal Stadium; Baton Rouge, LA	L 0–59	
October 26	vs. Mississippi Industrial*	Melrose Stadium; Memphis, TN	L 25–38	
November 2	Prairie View A&M	Pumphrey Stadium; Pine Bluff, AR	L 0–28	
November 9	at Alcorn A&M*	Henderson Stadium; Lorman, MS	W 13–7	
November 16	Langston	Pumphrey Stadium; Pine Bluff, AR	W 26–20	
November 23	at Texas Southern	Public School Stadium; Houston, TX	L 0–13	
*Non-conference game
