= 1958 Jackson State Tigers football team =

American college football season

1958 Jackson State Tigers football
- Conference: Midwest Athletic Association
- Record: 6–2–1 (2–0 MAA)
- Head coach: John Merritt (7th season)
- Home stadium: Alumni Field

1958 Midwest Athletic Association football standings
	Conf.					Overall
Team	W		L		T	W		L		T
No. 5 Lincoln (MO) $	3	–	0	–	0	7	–	1	–	0
No. 8 Jackson State	2	–	0	–	0	6	–	2	–	1
No. 14 Tennessee A&I	2	–	1	–	0	4	–	4	–	0
Central State (OH)	1	–	2	–	0	5	–	2	–	0
Kentucky State	0	–	3	–	0	0	–	7	–	1
$ – Conference champion; Rankings from Pittsburgh Courier

The 1958 Jackson State Tigers football team represented Jackson State College (now known as Jackson State University) as a member of the Midwest Athletic Association (MAA) during the 1958 college football season. Led by seventh-year head coach John Merritt, the Tigers compiled an overall record of 6–2–1.

== Schedule ==
Date	Opponent	Site	Result	Source
September 22	vs. Mississippi Industrial*	Tupelo, MS	W 26–0	
September 27	Prairie View A&M*	Alumni Field; Jackson, MS	T 14–14	
October 4	at Mississippi Vocational*	Magnolia Stadium; Itta Bena, MS	W 42–0	
October 13	Alcorn A&M*	Alumni Field; Jackson, MS (rivalry)	W 69–6	
October 25	at Southern*	Memorial Stadium; Baton Rouge, LA (rivalry)	L 6–30	
November 1	at Grambling*	Grambling Stadium; Grambling, LA	L 18–21	
November 8	Wiley*^{†}	Alumni Field; Jackson, MS	W 23–4	
November 15	at Kentucky State	Frankfort, KY	W 18–0	
November 22	Tennessee A&I	Alumni Field; Jackson, MS (rivalry)	W 18–13	
*Non-conference game; ^{†}Homecoming
