= 1958 Southern Jaguars football team =

American college football season

1958 Southern Jaguars football
- Conference: Southwestern Athletic Conference
- Record: 8–2 (3–2 SWAC)
- Head coach: Ace Mumford (23rd season)
- Home stadium: University Stadium

1958 Southwestern Athletic Conference football standings
	Conf.					Overall
Team	W		L		T	W		L		T
Prairie View A&M $	5	–	0	–	0	10	–	0	–	1
Southern	3	–	2	–	0	8	–	2	–	0
Texas College	3	–	2	–	0	5	–	4	–	0
Texas Southern	2	–	3	–	0	5	–	5	–	0
Wiley	2	–	3	–	0	5	–	5	–	0
Arkansas AM&N	0	–	5	–	0	3	–	6	–	0
$ – Conference champion

The 1958 Southern Jaguars football team was an American football team that represented Southern University as a member of the Southwestern Athletic Conference (SWAC) during the 1958 college football season. Led by Ace Mumford in his 23rd season as head coach, the Jaguars compiled an overall record of 8–2, with a mark of 3–2 in conference play, and finished tied for second in the SWAC.

== Schedule ==
Date	Opponent	Site	Result	Source
September 27	at Texas Southern	Jeppesen Stadium; Houston, TX	W 30–6	
October 4	at Alcorn A&M*	Henderson Stadium; Lorman, MS	W 56–0	
October 11	Xavier (LA)*	Municipal Stadium; Baton Rouge, LA (Pelican State Classic)	W 50–0	
October 18	Arkansas AM&N	University Stadium; Baton Rouge, LA	W 34–0	
October 25	Jackson State*	Memorial Stadium; Baton Rouge, LA (rivalry)	W 30–6	
November 1	at Texas College	Steer Stadium; Tyler, TX	L 6–13	
November 8	at Tennessee A&I*	Hale Stadium; Nashville, TN	W 23–14	
November 15	Wiley	University Stadium; Baton Rouge, LA	W 21–6	
November 22	Florida A&M*	University Stadium; Baton Rouge, LA	W 35–6	
November 29	at Prairie View A&M	Jeppesen Stadium; Houston, TX	L 14–20	
*Non-conference game
