= Billy Nicks =

American football player and coach (1905–1999)

Biographical details
- Born: August 2, 1905; Griffin, Georgia, U.S.
- Died: November 2, 1999 (aged 94); Houston, Texas, U.S.

Playing career
- 1920s: Morris Brown
- Positions: End, halfback, punter

Coaching career (HC unless noted)
- 1930–1935: Morris Brown
- 1937–1939: Morris Brown
- 1941–1942: Morris Brown
- 1945–1947: Prairie View A&M
- 1948–1951: Prairie View A&M (assistant)
- 1952–1965: Prairie View A&M

Administrative career (AD unless noted)
- 1952–1969: Prairie View A&M

Head coaching record
- Overall: 195–61–21
- Bowls: 13–5–1
- Tournaments: 1–1 (NAIA playoffs)

Accomplishments and honors

Championships
- 6 black college national (1941, 1953–1954, 1958, 1963–1964); 2 SIAC (1934, 1941); 7 SWAC (1952–1954, 1958, 1960, 1963–1964)

Awards
- NAIA Coach of the Year (1963)
- College Football Hall of Fame; Inducted in 1999 (profile)

William James Nicks (August 2, 1905 – November 2, 1999) was an American college football player and coach. He coached at historically black colleges in the Southern United States from 1930 to 1965. Nicks served as the head football coach at Morris Brown College in Georgia (1930–1935, 1937–1939, 1941–1942) and at Prairie View A&M University in Texas (1945–1947, 1952–1965). He was the NAIA Football Coach of the Year in 1963 and his teams were declared the black college football national champions six times. Nicks was inducted into the College Football Hall of Fame as a coach in 1999.

== Playing career ==
Nicks competed in high school and college football for Morris Brown College, playing end and halfback while being the team punter. He also competed on the Morris Brown College basketball, baseball, and track and field teams.

== Coaching career ==
=== Morris Brown ===
Nicks took first collegiate head coaching position at his alma mater, Morris Brown College in Atlanta, Georgia. Nicks was head football coach at Morris Brown from 1930 to 1935, again from 1937 to 1939, and for two more years in 1941 and 1942. His record at Morris Brown was 67–22–13. His 1941 team was named "Black College National Champions" by Pittsburgh Courier.

=== Prairie View A&M ===
Nicks was the eighth head coach at Prairie View A&M University in Prairie View, Texas, serving 17 seasons in two stints, from 1945 to 1947 and 1952 to 1965. His career record at Prairie View was 126–36–8—far and away the winningest coach in school history.

Nicks led the Panthers to five black college national titles and six Southwestern Athletic Conference titles. In his day, he was reckoned as the HBCU answer to Bear Bryant; indeed, his .787 winning percentage was slightly higher than Bryant's .780. This was partly because he had the pick of nearly every good black high school player in Texas in the days of segregation. His teams were among the few who held their own against Eddie Robinson's powerhouses at Grambling; Robinson later said that he dreaded playing Prairie View. While the end of Jim Crow caused a severe talent drain for HBCUs, Nicks was able to stem the tide for a time. He did so by relying on his former players who had gone into coaching; at one point nearly all of the black high school coaches in Texas had played for him. He often called his former players to send their best prospects to "The Hill," and wasn't above threatening to have them fired if they didn't do so. However, Prairie View's fortunes tailed off rapidly after Nicks' retirement. From 1966 to 2003, Prairie View had 14 head coaches, none of whom left "The Hill" with a winning record. This period included an NCAA-record 80-game losing streak from 1989 to 1998.

== Honors and death ==
Nicks was inducted into the College Football Hall of Fame as a coach in 1999. He died on November 2, 1999, in Houston, where he was buried.

== Head coaching record ==
Year	Team	Overall	Conference	Standing	Bowl/playoffs
Morris Brown Wolverines (Southern Intercollegiate Athletic Conference) (1930–1935)
1930	Morris Brown	6–2–1	4–2–1		
1931	Morris Brown	6–4	3–4		
1932	Morris Brown	6–1–1	5–1–1	2nd	
1933	Morris Brown	5–0–3			
1934	Morris Brown	7–1–2	5–0–2	1st	
1935	Morris Brown	3–4–2	2–2–2	7th	
Morris Brown Wolverines (Southern Intercollegiate Athletic Conference) (1937–1939)
1937	Morris Brown	6–3	5–2	3rd	
1938	Morris Brown	6–2–1	6–1–1	2nd	
1939	Morris Brown	7–2–2	5–2–2	5th	
Morris Brown Wolverines (Southern Intercollegiate Athletic Conference) (1941–1942)
1941	Morris Brown	10–1	7–0	1st	W Peach Blossom Classic, L Vulcan
1942	Morris Brown	5–2–1	3–2–1	4th	W Peach Blossom Classic
Morris Brown:		67–22–13			
Prairie View A&M (Southwestern Athletic Conference) (1945–1947)
1945	Prairie View	3–5–1	1–4–1	6th	W Prairie View
1946	Prairie View A&M	7–2–2	2–2–2	T–4th	W Prairie View
1947	Prairie View A&M	6–6	5–2	2nd	L Fruit, L Prairie View
Prairie View A&M (Southwestern Athletic Conference) (1952–1965)
1952	Prairie View A&M	7–2	6–0	1st	L Prairie View
1953	Prairie View A&M	12–0	6–0	1st	W Orange Blossom Classic, W Prairie View
1954	Prairie View A&M	10–1	6–0	1st	W Prairie View
1955	Prairie View A&M	8–2–1	5–1–1	T–2nd	W Prairie View
1956	Prairie View A&M	5–5	4–2	T–3rd	W Prairie View
1957	Prairie View A&M	6–3–1	4–2	T–2nd	T Prairie View
1958	Prairie View A&M	10–0–1	5–0	1st	W Orange Blossom Classic, W Prairie View
1959	Prairie View A&M	9–2	6–1	2nd	W Prairie View
1960	Prairie View A&M	10–1	6–1	T–1st	W Prairie View
1961	Prairie View A&M	5–4–1	3–4	5th	
1962	Prairie View A&M	6–3	4–3	T–3rd	
1963	Prairie View A&M	10–1	7–0	1st	L NAIA Championship (Camellia)
1964	Prairie View A&M	9–0	7–0	1st	
1965	Prairie View A&M	5–3–1	3–3–1	T–4th	
Prairie View A&M:		128–39–8	80–25–5		
Total:		195–61–21			
National championship Conference title Conference division title or championship game berth
