= 1955 Southern Jaguars football team =

American college football season

1955 Southern Jaguars football

SWAC champion
- Conference: Southwestern Athletic Conference
- Record: 7–2–1 (6–1 SWAC)
- Head coach: Ace Mumford (20th season)
- Home stadium: Memorial Stadium

1955 Southwestern Athletic Conference football standings
	Conf.					Overall
Team	W		L		T	W		L		T
No. 5 Southern $	6	–	1	–	0	7	–	2	–	1
No. 10 Prairie View A&M	5	–	1	–	1	8	–	2	–	1
No. 8 Texas Southern	5	–	1	–	1	7	–	2	–	1
No. 6 Langston	4	–	1	–	2	6	–	1	–	2
Texas College	2	–	5	–	0	3	–	6	–	0
Wiley	2	–	5	–	0	3	–	7	–	0
Arkansas AM&N	2	–	5	–	0	2	–	8	–	0
Bishop	0	–	7	–	0	0	–	10	–	0
$ – Conference champion; Rankings from the Pittsburgh Courier.

The 1955 Southern Jaguars football team was an American football team that represented Southern University in the Southwestern Athletic Conference (SWAC) during the 1955 college football season. In their 20th season under head coach Ace Mumford, the Jaguars compiled a 7–2–1 record, won the SWAC championship, and were ranked No. 5 in the final Pittsburgh Courier rankings of black college football teams.

== Schedule ==
Date	Time	Opponent	Site	Result	Attendance	Source
September 24	8:00 p.m.	Texas Southern	Memorial Stadium; Baton Rouge, LA	W 33–21		
October 1		Alcorn A&M	Baton Rouge, LA	T 18–18		
October 8		at Xavier (LA)	New Orleans, LA	W 51–0		
October 15		Arkansas AM&N	Memorial Stadium; Baton Rouge, LA	W 47–6		
October 22		at Langston	Anderson Field; Langston, OK	W 7–0		
October 29	2:00 p.m.	Texas College	Memorial Stadium; Baton Rouge, LA	W 38–14		
November 5		at Bishop	Marshall, TX	W (forfeit)		
November 12		Wiley	Memorial Stadium; Baton Rouge, LA	W 16–6		
November 19		at Florida A&M	Bragg Stadium; Tallahassee, FL	L 0–51	9,000	
November 26		Prairie View A&M	Baton Rouge, LA	L 19–21		
All times are in Central time
