= 1957 Prairie View A&M Panthers football team =

American college football season

1957 Prairie View A&M Panthers football

Prairie View Bowl, T 6–6 vs. Texas Southern
- Conference: Southwestern Athletic Conference
- Record: 6–3–1 (4–2 SWAC)
- Head coach: Billy Nicks (9th season)
- Home stadium: Blackshear Field

1957 Southwestern Athletic Conference football standings
	Conf.					Overall
Team	W		L		T	W		L		T
Wiley $	6	–	0	–	0	10	–	0	–	1
Texas Southern	4	–	2	–	0	7	–	3	–	1
Prairie View A&M	4	–	2	–	0	6	–	3	–	1
Southern	4	–	2	–	0	6	–	4	–	0
Arkansas AM&N	2	–	4	–	0	3	–	6	–	0
Texas College	1	–	5	–	0	4	–	5	–	0
Langston	0	–	6	–	0	0	–	9	–	0
$ – Conference champion

The 1957 Prairie View A&M Panthers football team represented Prairie View A&M College of Texas (now known as Prairie View A&M University) as a member of the Southwestern Athletic Conference (SWAC) during the 1957 college football season. Led by ninth-year head coach Billy Nicks, the Panthers compiled an overall record of 6–3–1, with a conference record of 4–2, and finished tied for second in the SWAC.

Their 28–0 victory at Arkansas AM&N was the first live televised game that featured two HBCUs.

== Schedule ==
Date	Opponent	Site	Result	Source
September 28	Jackson*	Blackshear Field; Prairie View, TX	W 22–7	
October 14	vs. Texas Southern	Cotton Bowl; Dallas, TX (State Fair Classic, rivalry)	W 7–6	
October 26	Grambling*	Blackshear Field; Prairie View, TX	W 25–14	
November 2	at Arkansas AM&N	Pumphrey Stadium; Pine Bluff, AR	W 28–0	
November 9	at Texas College	Steer Stadium; Tyler, TX	W 20–13	
November 16	at Tennessee A&I*	Hale Stadium; Nashville, TN	L 7–32	
November 23	Langston^{†}	Blackshear Field; Prairie View, TX	W 19–0	
November 30	at Southern	Municipal Stadium; Baton Rouge, LA	L 13–18	
December 7	Wiley	Blackshear Field; Prairie View, TX	L 6–14	
January 1, 1958	vs. Texas Southern*	Public School Stadium; Houston, TX (Prairie View Bowl)	T 6–6	
*Non-conference game; ^{†}Homecoming
