= 1957 Southern Jaguars football team =

American college football season

1957 Southern Jaguars football
- Conference: Southwestern Athletic Conference
- Record: 6–4 (4–2 SWAC)
- Head coach: Ace Mumford (22nd season)
- Home stadium: Municipal Stadium

1957 Southwestern Athletic Conference football standings
	Conf.					Overall
Team	W		L		T	W		L		T
Wiley $	6	–	0	–	0	10	–	0	–	1
Texas Southern	4	–	2	–	0	7	–	3	–	1
Prairie View A&M	4	–	2	–	0	6	–	3	–	1
Southern	4	–	2	–	0	6	–	4	–	0
Arkansas AM&N	2	–	4	–	0	3	–	6	–	0
Texas College	1	–	5	–	0	4	–	5	–	0
Langston	0	–	6	–	0	0	–	9	–	0
$ – Conference champion

The 1957 Southern Jaguars football team was an American football team that represented Southern University as a member of the Southwestern Athletic Conference (SWAC) during the 1957 college football season. Led by Ace Mumford in his 22nd season as head coach, the Jaguars compiled an overall record of 6–4, with a mark of 4–2 in conference play, and finished tied for second in the SWAC.

== Schedule ==
Date	Opponent	Site	Result	Source
September 28	Texas Southern	Municipal Stadium; Baton Rouge, LA	L 6–19	
October 5	Alcorn A&M*	Municipal Stadium; Baton Rouge, LA	W 47–0	
October 12	at Xavier (LA)*	Xavier Stadium; New Orleans, LA	W 38–0	
October 19	Arkansas AM&N	Municipal Stadium; Baton Rouge, LA	W 59–0	
October 26	at Langston	Anderson Stadium; Langston, OK	W 40–20	
November 2	Texas College	Municipal Stadium; Baton Rouge, LA	W 48–7	
November 9	Tennessee A&I*	Municipal Stadium; Baton Rouge, LA	L 14–33	
November 16	at Wiley	Wiley Field; Marshall, TX	L 20–24	
November 23	at Florida A&M*	Bragg Memorial Stadium; Tallahassee, FL	L 6–32	
November 30	Prairie View A&M	Municipal Stadium; Baton Rouge, LA	W 18–13	
*Non-conference game
