= 1955 Arkansas AM&N Golden Lions football team =

American college football season

1955 Arkansas AM&N Golden Lions football
- Conference: Southwestern Athletic Conference
- Record: 2–8 (2–5 SWAC)
- Head coach: Leroy Moore (3rd season)

1955 Southwestern Athletic Conference football standings
	Conf.					Overall
Team	W		L		T	W		L		T
No. 5 Southern $	6	–	1	–	0	7	–	2	–	1
No. 10 Prairie View A&M	5	–	1	–	1	8	–	2	–	1
No. 8 Texas Southern	5	–	1	–	1	7	–	2	–	1
No. 6 Langston	4	–	1	–	2	6	–	1	–	2
Texas College	2	–	5	–	0	3	–	6	–	0
Wiley	2	–	5	–	0	3	–	7	–	0
Arkansas AM&N	2	–	5	–	0	2	–	8	–	0
Bishop	0	–	7	–	0	0	–	10	–	0
$ – Conference champion; Rankings from the Pittsburgh Courier.

The 1955 Arkansas AM&N Golden Lions football team represented Arkansas Agricultural, Mechanical and Normal College—now known as University of Arkansas at Pine Bluff—as a member of the Southwestern Athletic Conference (SWAC) during the 1955 college football season. In their third and final season under head coach Leroy Moore, the Golden Lions compiled an overall record of 2–8 with a mark of 2–5 in conference play, placing in a three-way tie for fifth in the SWAC.

== Schedule ==
Date	Opponent	Site	Result	Source
September 24	Lincoln (MO)*	Pine Bluff, AR	L 7–9	
October 1	Texas College	Pine Bluff, AR	L 0–6	
October 8	Wiley	Pine Bluff, AR	W 26–12	
October 15	at Southern	Memorial Stadium; Baton Rouge, LA	L 6–47	
October 22	at Bishop	Marshall, TX	W 19–6	
October 29	Prairie View A&M	Pine Bluff, AR	L 0–26	
November 5	vs. Alcorn A&M*	Melrose Stadium; Memphis, TN (Tri-State Classic)	L 2–19	
November 12	Langston	Pine Bluff, AR	L 6–14	
November 19	at Grambling*	Grambling Stadium; Grambling, LA	L 6–38	
November 26	at Texas Southern	Houston, TX	L 0–64	
*Non-conference game
