= 1941 Louisiana Normal Tigers football team =

American college football season

1941 Louisiana Normal Tigers football
- Conference: Bi-State Conference
- Record: 2–6–1 (1–2 Bi-State)
- Head coach: Eddie Robinson (1st season)

The 1941 Louisiana Normal Tigers football team represented Louisiana Negro Normal and Industrial Institute—now known as Grambling State University—a—as a member of the Bi-State Conference during the 1941 college football season. In their first season under head coach Eddie Robinson, the Tigers compiled an overall record of 2–6–1 record with a mark of 1–2 in conference play.

== Schedule ==
Date	Time	Opponent	Site	Result	Source
October 4		at Philander Smith*	Little Rock, AR	L 0–2	
October 11		Jarvis Christian	Grambling, LA	L 0–13	
October 18		Dillard*		L 0–7	
October 25	2:00 p.m.	at Alabama A&M*	Huntsville, AL	L 0–27	
November 1		Leland*		L 13–19	
November 7		at Samuel Huston	Anderson High School stadium; Austin, TX	L 0–6	
November 15		vs. Tillotson	Houston, TX	W 37–6	
November 22		Tougaloo*^{†}	Gramlbing, LA	T 12–12	
		Arkansas Baptist*		W 60–0	
*Non-conference game; ^{†}Homecoming
