= 1959 Southern Jaguars football team =

American college football season

1959 Southern Jaguars football

SWAC champion
- Conference: Southwestern Athletic Conference
- Record: 8–2 (7–0 SWAC)
- Head coach: Ace Mumford (24th season)
- Home stadium: University Stadium

1959 Southwestern Athletic Conference football standings
	Conf.					Overall
Team		W		L			W		L
Southern $	7	–	0	–	0	8	–	2	–	0
No. 16 Prairie View A&M	6	–	1	–	0	9	–	2	–	0
Texas Southern	5	–	2	–	0	7	–	3	–	0
Jackson State	4	–	3	–	0	6	–	4	–	0
Arkansas AM&N	2	–	5	–	0	4	–	6	–	0
Grambling	2	–	5	–	0	4	–	6	–	0
Texas College	2	–	5	–	0	4	–	6	–	0
Wiley	0	–	7	–	0	2	–	8	–	0
$ – Conference champion; Rankings from NAIA poll

The 1959 Southern Jaguars football team was an American football team that represented Southern University in the 1959 college football season. In their 24th season under head coach Ace Mumford, the Jaguars compiled an 8–2 record (7–0 against SWAC opponents), won the SWAC championship, and outscored all opponents by a total of 267 to 93. The team played its home games at University Stadium in Baton Rouge, Louisiana.

== Schedule ==
Date	Opponent	Site	Result	Attendance	Source
September 26	Texas Southern	University Stadium; Baton Rouge, LA	W 32–8	9,597	
October 3	at Grambling	Grambling Stadium; Grambling, LA (rivalry)	W 12–6	18,661	
October 10	at Xavier (LA)*	Xavier Stadium; New Orleans, LA	W 35–12	6,160	
October 17	Arkansas AM&N	University Stadium; Baton Rouge, LA	W 56–8	6,653	
October 24	at Jackson State	Alumni Field; Jackson, MS (rivalry)	W 22–9	5,230	
October 31	Texas College	University Stadium; Baton Rouge, LA	W 45–0	13,461	
November 7	Tennessee A&I*	University Stadium; Baton Rouge, LA	L 13–17	11,116	
November 14	at Wiley	Wildcat Stadium; Marshall, TX	W 18–6	4,330	
November 21	at Florida A&M*	Bragg Memorial Stadium; Tallahassee, FL	L 14–21		
November 28	Prairie View A&M	University Stadium; Baton Rouge, LA	W 20–6		
*Non-conference game
