= 1958 Grambling Tigers football team =

American college football season

1958 Grambling Tigers football
- Conference: Independent
- Record: 6–3
- Head coach: Eddie Robinson (16th season)
- Home stadium: Grambling Stadium

The 1958 Grambling Tigers football team represented Grambling College (now known as Grambling State University) as an independent during the 1958 college football season. Led by 16th-year head coach Eddie Robinson, the Tigers compiled an overall record of 6–3.

== Schedule ==
Date	Opponent	Site	Result	Source
September 27	Alcorn A&M	Grambling Stadium; Grambling, LA	W 48–6	
October 4	Paul Quinn	Grambling Stadium; Grambling, LA	W 72–8	
October 11	Tennessee A&I	Grambling Stadium; Grambling, LA	W 7–6	
October 20	vs. Wiley	State Fair Stadium; Shreveport, LA	W 19–15	
October 25	Prairie View A&M	Grambling Stadium; Grambling, LA	L 6–44	
November 1	Jackson State	Grambling Stadium; Grambling, LA	W 21–18	
November 8	at Texas Southern	Public School Stadium; Houston, TX	L 7–21	
November 15	Arkansas AM&N	Grambling Stadium; Grambling, LA	L 6–7	
November 22	at Mississippi Vocational	Magnolia Stadium; Itta Bena, MS	W 53–7	
