= 1955 Prairie View A&M Panthers football team =

American college football season

1955 Prairie View A&M Panthers football

Prairie View Bowl, W 59–0 vs. Fisk
- Conference: Southwestern Athletic Conference
- Record: 8–2–1 (5–1–1 SWAC)
- Head coach: Billy Nicks (7th season)
- Home stadium: Blackshear Field

1955 Southwestern Athletic Conference football standings
	Conf.					Overall
Team	W		L		T	W		L		T
No. 5 Southern $	6	–	1	–	0	7	–	2	–	1
No. 10 Prairie View A&M	5	–	1	–	1	8	–	2	–	1
No. 8 Texas Southern	5	–	1	–	1	7	–	2	–	1
No. 6 Langston	4	–	1	–	2	6	–	1	–	2
Texas College	2	–	5	–	0	3	–	6	–	0
Wiley	2	–	5	–	0	3	–	7	–	0
Arkansas AM&N	2	–	5	–	0	2	–	8	–	0
Bishop	0	–	7	–	0	0	–	10	–	0
$ – Conference champion; Rankings from the Pittsburgh Courier.

The 1955 Prairie View A&M Panthers football team represented Prairie View A&M College of Texas—now known as Prairie View A&M University—as a member of the Southwestern Athletic Conference (SWAC) during the 1955 college football season. In their seventh season under head coach Billy Nicks, the Panthers compiled an overall record of 8–2–1 with a mark of 5–1–1 in conference play, tying for second place in the SWAC. Prairie View A&M defeated Fisk in the Prairie View Bowl, 59–0.

== Schedule ==
Date	Time	Opponent	Site	Result	Attendance	Source
September 17		Morris Brown*	Prairie View, TX	W 26–0	4,000	
September 24		Jackson State*	Prairie View, TX	W 31–6		
October 1		Bishop	Prairie View, TX	W 60–0		
October 8		at Texas Southern	Public School Stadium; Houston, TX (rivalry)	L 18–27	14,402	
October 17		vs. Wiley	Cotton Bowl; Dallas, TX (State Fair Classic)	W 34–7		
October 29		at Arkansas AM&N	Pine Bluff, AR	W 26–0		
November 5	2:00 p.m.	at Texas College	Steer Stadium; Tyler, TX	W 34–13		
November 12		Grambling*	Prairie View, TX	L 7–26		
November 19		Langston^{†}	Blackshear Field; Prairie View, TX	T 19–19		
November 26		at Southern	Baton Rouge, LA	W 21–19		
January 2		vs. Fisk*	Houston, TX (Prairie View Bowl)	W 59–0	7,500	
*Non-conference game; ^{†}Homecoming; All times are in Central time
