= 1955 Bishop Tigers football team =

American college football season

1955 Bishop Tigers football
- Conference: Southwestern Athletic Conference
- Record: 0–10 (0–7 SWAC)
- Head coach: Nathan E. Jones (1st season)

1955 Southwestern Athletic Conference football standings
| | Conf. | | | | | Overall |
| Team | W | | L | | T | W | | L | | T |
|---|---|---|---|---|---|---|---|---|---|---|
| No. 5 Southern $ | 6 | – | 1 | – | 0 | 7 | – | 2 | – | 1 |
| No. 10 Prairie View A&M | 5 | – | 1 | – | 1 | 8 | – | 2 | – | 1 |
| No. 8 Texas Southern | 5 | – | 1 | – | 1 | 7 | – | 2 | – | 1 |
| No. 6 Langston | 4 | – | 1 | – | 2 | 6 | – | 1 | – | 2 |
| Texas College | 2 | – | 5 | – | 0 | 3 | – | 6 | – | 0 |
| Wiley | 2 | – | 5 | – | 0 | 3 | – | 7 | – | 0 |
| Arkansas AM&N | 2 | – | 5 | – | 0 | 2 | – | 8 | – | 0 |
| Bishop | 0 | – | 7 | – | 0 | 0 | – | 10 | – | 0 |
$ – Conference champion; Rankings from the Pittsburgh Courier.

The 1955 Bishop Tigers football team represented Bishop College as a member of the Southwestern Athletic Conference (SWAC) during the 1955 college football season. In their first season under head coach Nathan E. Jones, the Tigers an overall record of 0–10 with a mark of 0–7 in conference play, placing last out of eight teams in the SWAC.

== Schedule ==
| Date | Time | Opponent | Site | Result | Source |
|---|---|---|---|---|---|
| September 17 | 8:00 p.m. | at Butler (TX)* | Texas College stadium; Tyler, TX | L 0–18 | |
| September 24 | 8:00 p.m. | Langston | Wiley College Stadium; Marshall, TX | L 0–46 | |
| October 1 | | at Prairie View A&M | Prairie View, TX | L 0–60 | |
| October 8 | 8:00 p.m. | Paul Quinn* | Wiley College Stadium; Marshall, TX | L 0–20 | |
| October 15 | | vs. Grambling* | Wildcat Stadium; Lake Charles, LA | L 0–80 | |
| October 22 | | Arkansas AM&N | Marshall, TX | L 6–19 | |
| October 29 | 8:00 p.m. | at Wiley | Wildcat Stadium; Marshall, TX | L 0–67 | |
| November 5 | | Southern | Marshall, TX | L (forfeit) | |
| November 12 | | at Texas College | Tyler, TX | L 7–47 | |
| November 19 | | Texas Southern | Marshall, TX | L 0–84 | |
*Non-conference game; All times are in Central time
