= 1959 Tennessee A&I Tigers football team =

American college football season

1959 Tennessee A&I Tigers football

MWAA champion
- Conference: Midwest Athletic Association
- Record: 9–1 (3–0 MWAA)
- Head coach: Howard C. Gentry (5th season)
- Home stadium: Hale Stadium

1959 Midwest Athletic Association football standings
	Conf.					Overall
Team	W		L		T	W		L		T
No. 2 Tennessee A&I $	3	–	0	–	0	9	–	1	–	0
No. 21 Kentucky State	1	–	1	–	1	3	–	5	–	1
No. 22 Central State (OH)	1	–	2	–	0	4	–	3	–	1
No. 11 Lincoln (MO)	0	–	2	–	1	7	–	2	–	1
$ – Conference champion; Rankings from Associated Negro Press

The 1959 Tennessee A&I Tigers football team represented Tennessee Agricultural & Industrial State College (now known as Tennessee State University) as a member of the Midwest Athletic Association (MWAA) during the 1959 college football season. Led by fifth-year head coach Howard C. Gentry, the Tigers compiled an overall record of 9–1, with a 3–0 conference record, and finished as MWAA champion.

== Schedule ==
Date	Opponent	Site	Result	Attendance	Source
September 19	at Youngstown*	Rayen Stadium; Youngstown, OH	L 12–13	11,000	
September 26	North Carolina A&T*	Hale Stadium; Nashville, TN	W 26–24	4,200	
October 3	at Morris Brown*	Herndon Stadium; Atlanta, GA	W 14–12		
October 10	Grambling*	Hale Stadium; Nashville, TN	W 26–21	5,000	
October 17	at South Carolina State*	State College Stadium; Orangeburg, SC	W 47–8		
October 24	Central State (OH)	Hale Stadium; Nashville, TN	W 14–0	3,000	
November 7	at Southern*	University Stadium; Baton Rouge, LA	W 17–13	11,116	
November 14	at Lincoln (MO)	Lincoln Field; Jefferson City, MO	W 27–0		
November 21	at Kentucky State	Alumni Field; Frankfort, KY	W 19–8		
November 26	Jackson State*	Hale Stadium; Nashville, TN	W 26–6		
*Non-conference game
