= 1959 Arkansas AM&N Golden Lions football team =

American college football season

1959 Arkansas AM&N Golden Lions football
- Conference: Southwestern Athletic Conference
- Record: 4–6 (2–5 SWAC)
- Head coach: Charles Spearman (3rd season)
- Home stadium: Pumphrey Stadium

1959 Southwestern Athletic Conference football standings
	Conf.					Overall
Team		W		L			W		L
Southern $	7	–	0	–	0	8	–	2	–	0
No. 16 Prairie View A&M	6	–	1	–	0	9	–	2	–	0
Texas Southern	5	–	2	–	0	7	–	3	–	0
Jackson State	4	–	3	–	0	6	–	4	–	0
Arkansas AM&N	2	–	5	–	0	4	–	6	–	0
Grambling	2	–	5	–	0	4	–	6	–	0
Texas College	2	–	5	–	0	4	–	6	–	0
Wiley	0	–	7	–	0	2	–	8	–	0
$ – Conference champion; Rankings from NAIA poll

The 1959 Arkansas AM&N Golden Lions football team represented the Arkansas Agricultural, Mechanical and Normal College (now known as the University of Arkansas at Pine Bluff) as a member of the Southwestern Athletic Conference (SWAC) during the 1959 college football season. Led by third-year head coach Charles Spearman, the Golden Lions compiled an overall record of 4–6, with a conference record of 2–5, and finished tied for fifth in the SWAC.

== Schedule ==
Date	Opponent	Site	Result	Source
September 18	vs. Mississippi Industrial*	Melrose Stadium; Memphis, TN	W 54–0	
September 26	Lincoln (MO)*	Pumphrey Stadium; Pine Bluff, AR	L 16–28	
October 3	at Texas College	Steer Stadium; Tyler, TX	L 14–16	
October 10	Jackson State	Pumphrey Stadium; Pine Bluff, AR	L 12–18	
October 17	at Southern	University Stadium; Baton Rouge, LA	L 8–56	
October 24	Wiley^{†}	Pumphrey Stadium; Pine Bluff, AR	W 24–13	
October 31	Prairie View A&M	Pumphrey Stadium; Pine Bluff, AR	L 0–29	
November 7	at Alcorn A&M*	Henderson Stadium; Lorman, MS	W 41–14	
November 14	Grambling	Pumphrey Stadium; Pine Bluff, AR	W 7–6	
November 21	at Texas Southern	Jeppesen Stadium; Houston, TX	L 8–13	
*Non-conference game; ^{†}Homecoming
