= 1957 Langston Lions football team =

American college football season

1957 Langston Lions football
- Conference: Southwestern Athletic Conference
- Record: 0–9 (0–6 SWAC)
- Head coach: Caesar Felton Gayles (28th season)
- Home stadium: Anderson Field

1957 Southwestern Athletic Conference football standings
	Conf.					Overall
Team	W		L		T	W		L		T
Wiley $	6	–	0	–	0	10	–	0	–	1
Texas Southern	4	–	2	–	0	7	–	3	–	1
Prairie View A&M	4	–	2	–	0	6	–	3	–	1
Southern	4	–	2	–	0	6	–	4	–	0
Arkansas AM&N	2	–	4	–	0	3	–	6	–	0
Texas College	1	–	5	–	0	4	–	5	–	0
Langston	0	–	6	–	0	0	–	9	–	0
$ – Conference champion

The 1957 Langston Lions football team represented Langston University as a member of the Southwestern Athletic Conference (SWAC) during the 1957 college football season. Led by 28th-year head coach Caesar Felton Gayles, the Lions compiled an overall record of 0–9, with a conference record of 0–6, and finished seventh in the SWAC.

After the 1957 season, Langston withdrew from the SWAC. For the 1958 season, Langston joined the previously-segregated Oklahoma Collegiate Conference.

== Schedule ==
Date	Opponent	Site	Result	Attendance	Source
September 14	at Southwestern State (OK)*	Milam Stadium; Weatherford, OK	L 0–7		
September 21	vs. Central State (OK)*	Guthrie, OK	L 6–14		
October 5	Tennessee A&I*	Anderson Stadium; Langston, OK	Canceled		
October 12	at Texas College	Steer Stadium; Tyler, TX	L 6–26		
October 19	vs. Lincoln (MO)*	Municipal Stadium; Kansas City, MO	L 2–19	4,000	
October 26	Southern	Anderson Stadium; Langston, OK	L 20–40		
November 2	vs. Texas Southern	Farrington Field; Fort Worth, TX	L 18–39	3,500	
November 9	Wiley	Anderson Stadium; Langston, OK	L 7–21		
November 16	at Arkansas AM&N	Pumphrey Stadium; Pine Bluff, AR	L 20–26		
November 23	at Prairie View A&M	Blackshear Field; Prairie View, TX	L 0–19		
*Non-conference game
