= 1959 Texas College Steers football team =

American college football season

1959 Texas College Steers football
- Conference: Southwestern Athletic Conference
- Record: 4–6 (2–5 SWAC)
- Head coach: Bo McMichael (3rd season)
- Home stadium: Steer Stadium

1959 Southwestern Athletic Conference football standings
| | Conf. | | | | | Overall |
| Team | | W | | L | | | W | | L |
|---|---|---|---|---|---|---|---|---|---|---|
| Southern $ | 7 | – | 0 | – | 0 | 8 | – | 2 | – | 0 |
| No. 16 Prairie View A&M | 6 | – | 1 | – | 0 | 9 | – | 2 | – | 0 |
| Texas Southern | 5 | – | 2 | – | 0 | 7 | – | 3 | – | 0 |
| Jackson State | 4 | – | 3 | – | 0 | 6 | – | 4 | – | 0 |
| Arkansas AM&N | 2 | – | 5 | – | 0 | 4 | – | 6 | – | 0 |
| Grambling | 2 | – | 5 | – | 0 | 4 | – | 6 | – | 0 |
| Texas College | 2 | – | 5 | – | 0 | 4 | – | 6 | – | 0 |
| Wiley | 0 | – | 7 | – | 0 | 2 | – | 8 | – | 0 |
$ – Conference champion; Rankings from NAIA poll

The 1959 Texas College Steers football team represented Texas College as a member of the Southwestern Athletic Conference (SWAC) during the 1959 college football season. Led by third-year head coach Bo McMichael, the Steers compiled an overall record of 4–6 and a mark of 2–5 in conference play, and finished tied for fifth in the SWAC.

== Schedule ==
| Date | Opponent | Site | Result | Source |
|---|---|---|---|---|
| September 19 | Paul Quinn* | Steer Stadium; Tyler, TX | W 28–12 | |
| September 26 | at Grambling | Grambling Stadium; Grambling, LA | L 10–19 | |
| October 3 | Arkansas AM&N | Steer Stadium; Tyler, TX | W 16–14 | |
| October 10 | vs. Langston* | Farrington Field; Fort Worth, TX | L 0–37 | |
| October 24 | at Dillard* | Alumni Stadium; New Orleans, LA | W 8–6 | |
| October 31 | at Southern | University Stadium; Baton Rouge, LA | L 0–45 | |
| November 7 | Prairie View A&M | Steer Field; Tyler, TX | L 11–23 | |
| November 21 | Jackson State | Steer Stadium; Tyler, TX | L 18–55 | |
| November 26 | at Wiley | Wildcat Stadium; Marshall, TX | W 22–20 | |
| December 5 | at Texas Southern | Jeppesen Stadium; Houston, TX | L 6–22 | |
*Non-conference game
