= 1957 Wiley Wildcats football team =

American college football season

1957 Wiley Wildcats football

SWAC champion

Aztec Bowl, W 78–20 vs. Mexico Military Academy
- Conference: Southwestern Athletic Conference
- Record: 10–0–1 (6–0 SWAC)
- Head coach: Fred T. Long (27th season)
- Home stadium: Wiley Field

1957 Southwestern Athletic Conference football standings
	Conf.					Overall
Team	W		L		T	W		L		T
Wiley $	6	–	0	–	0	10	–	0	–	1
Texas Southern	4	–	2	–	0	7	–	3	–	1
Prairie View A&M	4	–	2	–	0	6	–	3	–	1
Southern	4	–	2	–	0	6	–	4	–	0
Arkansas AM&N	2	–	4	–	0	3	–	6	–	0
Texas College	1	–	5	–	0	4	–	5	–	0
Langston	0	–	6	–	0	0	–	9	–	0
$ – Conference champion

The 1957 Wiley Wildcats football team represented Wiley College as a member of the Southwestern Athletic Conference (SWAC) during the 1957 college football season. Led by 27th-year head coach Fred T. Long, the Wildcats compiled an overall record of 10–0–1, with a conference record of 6–0, and finished as SWAC champion.

== Schedule ==
Date	Opponent	Site	Result	Source
September 28	Bishop*	Wiley Field; Marshall, TX	W 46–0	
October 5	Texas Southern	Wiley Field; Marshall, TX	W 12–6	
October 12	at Arkansas AM&N	Pumphrey Stadium; Pine Bluff, AR	W 20–0	
October 21	vs. Grambling*	State Fair Stadium; Shreveport, LA (State Fair Classic)	W 44–12	
October 26	Alcorn A&M*	Wiley Field; Marshall, TX	W 46–7	
November 2	at Mississippi Vocational*	Itta Bena, MS	T 19–19	
November 9	at Langston	Anderson Stadium; Langston, OK	W 21–7	
November 16	Southern^{†}	Wiley Field; Marshall, TX	W 24–20	
November 28	Texas College	Wiley Field; Marshall, TX	W 41–20	
December 7	at Prairie View A&M	Blackshear Field; Prairie View, TX	W 14–6	
December 16	vs. Heroico Colegio Militar*	Alamo Stadium; San Antonio, TX (Aztec Bowl)	W 78–20	
*Non-conference game; ^{†}Homecoming
