= 1959 Grambling Tigers football team =

American college football season

1959 Grambling Tigers football
- Conference: Southwestern Athletic Conference
- Record: 5–5 (2–5 SWAC)
- Head coach: Eddie Robinson (17th season)
- Home stadium: Grambling Stadium

1959 Southwestern Athletic Conference football standings
| | Conf. | | | | | Overall |
| Team | | W | | L | | | W | | L |
|---|---|---|---|---|---|---|---|---|---|---|
| Southern $ | 7 | – | 0 | – | 0 | 8 | – | 2 | – | 0 |
| No. 16 Prairie View A&M | 6 | – | 1 | – | 0 | 9 | – | 2 | – | 0 |
| Texas Southern | 5 | – | 2 | – | 0 | 7 | – | 3 | – | 0 |
| Jackson State | 4 | – | 3 | – | 0 | 6 | – | 4 | – | 0 |
| Arkansas AM&N | 2 | – | 5 | – | 0 | 4 | – | 6 | – | 0 |
| Grambling | 2 | – | 5 | – | 0 | 4 | – | 6 | – | 0 |
| Texas College | 2 | – | 5 | – | 0 | 4 | – | 6 | – | 0 |
| Wiley | 0 | – | 7 | – | 0 | 2 | – | 8 | – | 0 |
$ – Conference champion; Rankings from NAIA poll

The 1959 Grambling Tigers football team represented Grambling College (now known as Grambling State University) as a member of the Southwestern Athletic Conference (SWAC) during the 1959 college football season. Led by 17th-year head coach Eddie Robinson, the Tigers compiled an overall record of 5–5 and a mark of 2–5 in conference play, and finished tied for fifth in the SWAC.

== Schedule ==
| Date | Opponent | Site | Result | Attendance | Source |
|---|---|---|---|---|---|
| September 19 | at Bishop* | Dallas, TX | W 48–6 | | |
| September 26 | Texas College | Grambling Stadium; Grambling, LA | W 19–10 | | |
| October 3 | Southern | Grambling Stadium; Grambling, LA (rivalry) | L 6–12 | 18,500 | |
| October 10 | at Tennessee A&I* | Hale Stadium; Nashville, TN | L 21–26 | 5,000 | |
| October 17 | vs. Wiley | State Fair Stadium; Shreveport, LA | W 42–20 | 1,000 | |
| October 26 | vs. Prairie View A&M | State Fair Stadium; Shreveport, LA (rivalry) | L 6–35 | 9,500 | |
| October 31 | at Jackson State | Alumni Stadium; Jackson, MS | L 13–14 | | |
| November 7 | Texas Southern^{†} | Grambling Stadium; Grambling, LA | W 14–15 | | |
| November 14 | at Arkansas AM&N | Pumphrey Stadium; Pine Bluff, AR | L 6–7 | | |
| November 21 | Mississippi Vocational* | Grambling Stadium; Grambling, LA | W 93–0 | 5,000 | |
*Non-conference game; ^{†}Homecoming
