= 1958 Wiley Wildcats football team =

American college football season

1958 Wiley Wildcats football
- Conference: Southwestern Athletic Conference
- Record: 5–5 (2–3 SWAC)
- Head coach: Fred T. Long (28th season)
- Home stadium: Wiley Field

1958 Southwestern Athletic Conference football standings
	Conf.					Overall
Team	W		L		T	W		L		T
Prairie View A&M $	5	–	0	–	0	10	–	0	–	1
Southern	3	–	2	–	0	8	–	2	–	0
Texas College	3	–	2	–	0	5	–	4	–	0
Texas Southern	2	–	3	–	0	5	–	5	–	0
Wiley	2	–	3	–	0	5	–	5	–	0
Arkansas AM&N	0	–	5	–	0	3	–	6	–	0
$ – Conference champion

The 1958 Wiley Wildcats football team represented Wiley College as a member of the Southwestern Athletic Conference (SWAC) during the 1958 college football season. Led by 28th-year head coach Fred T. Long, the Wildcats compiled an overall record of 5–5, with a conference record of 2–3, and finished tied for fourth in the SWAC.

== Schedule ==
Date	Opponent	Site	Result	Source
September 27	Bishop*	Wiley Field; Marshall, TX	W 46–8	
October 11	Arkansas AM&N	Wiley Field; Marshall, TX	W 32–6	
October 20	vs. Grambling*	State Fair Stadium; Shreveport, LA (State Fair Classic)	L 15–19	
October 25	at Alcorn A&M*	Henderson Stadium; Lorman, MS	W 74–0	
November 1	at Texas Southern	Public School Stadium; Houston, TX	L 0–14	
November 8	at Jackson State*	Alumni Field; Jackson, MS	L 4–23	
November 15	at Southern	University Stadium; Baton Rouge, LA	L 6–21	
November 22	Prairie View A&M	Wiley Field; Marshall, TX	L 0–13	
November 27	at Texas College	Steer Stadium; Tyler, TX	W 19–13	
December 6	Mississippi Vocational*	Wiley Field; Marshall, TX	W 25–7	
*Non-conference game
