= 1957 Grambling Tigers football team =

American college football season

1957 Grambling Tigers football
- Conference: Midwest Athletic Association
- Record: 4–4 (0–1 MWAA)
- Head coach: Eddie Robinson (15th season)
- Home stadium: Tiger Stadium

1957 Midwest Athletic Association football standings
| | Conf. | | | | | Overall |
| Team | W | | L | | T | W | | L | | T |
|---|---|---|---|---|---|---|---|---|---|---|
| No. 2 Tennessee A&I + | 3 | – | 0 | – | 0 | 5 | – | 0 | – | 1 |
| No. 22 Jackson State + | 2 | – | 0 | – | 0 | 6 | – | 2 | – | 0 |
| No. 5 Lincoln (MO) | 2 | – | 1 | – | 0 | 8 | – | 1 | – | 0 |
| Kentucky State | 1 | – | 3 | – | 0 | 3 | – | 6 | – | 0 |
| Grambling | 0 | – | 1 | – | 0 | 4 | – | 4 | – | 0 |
| Central State (OH) | 0 | – | 3 | – | 0 | 4 | – | 4 | – | 1 |
+ – Conference co-champions; Rankings from Pittsburgh Courier

The 1957 Grambling Tigers football team represented Grambling College (now known as Grambling State University) as a member of the Midwest Athletic Association (MWAA) during the 1957 college football season. Led by 15th-year head coach Eddie Robinson, the Tigers compiled an overall record of 4–4 and a mark of 0–1 in conference play.

== Schedule ==
| Date | Opponent | Site | Result | Source |
|---|---|---|---|---|
| September 28 | at Alcorn A&M* | Henderson Stadium; Lorman, MS | W 53–0 | |
| October 5 | at Paul Quinn* | Waco, TX | W 60–0 | |
| October 11 | Tennessee A&I | Tiger Stadium; Grambling, LA | Canceled | |
| October 21 | vs. Wiley* | State Fair Stadium; Shreveport, LA | L 12–44 | |
| October 26 | at Prairie View A&M* | Blackshear Field; Prairie View, TX | L 14–25 | |
| November 2 | Jackson State | Tiger Stadium; Grambling, LA | L 20–39 | |
| November 9 | Bethune–Cookman* | Tiger Stadium; Grambling, LA | W 20–12 | |
| November 16 | at Texas Southern* | Public School Stadium; Houston, TX | L 14–59 | |
| November 23 | Mississippi Vocational* | Tiger Stadium; Grambling, LA | W 19–12 | |
*Non-conference game
