= 1958 Florida A&M Rattlers football team =

American college football season

1958 Florida A&M Rattlers football

SIAC champion

Orange Blossom Classic, L 8–26 vs. Prairie View A&M
- Conference: Southern Intercollegiate Athletic Conference
- Record: 7–2 (5–0 SIAC)
- Head coach: Jake Gaither (14th season)
- Home stadium: Bragg Memorial Stadium

1958 Southern Intercollegiate Athletic Conference football standings
	Conf.					Overall
Team	W		L		T	W		L		T
Florida A&M $	5	–	0	–	0	7	–	2	–	0
South Carolina State	7	–	1	–	0	7	–	2	–	0
Alabama State	6	–	1	–	0	6	–	2	–	0
Tuskegee	5	–	2	–	1	6	–	3	–	1
Fort Valley State	3	–	2	–	1	5	–	2	–	1
Xavier (LA)	3	–	2	–	1	3	–	3	–	1
Clark (GA)	3	–	4	–	0	4	–	4	–	0
Benedict	3	–	3	–	0	5	–	5	–	0
Morehouse	3	–	3	–	0	3	–	4	–	1
Morris Brown	2	–	4	–	0	4	–	5	–	0
Alabama A&M	1	–	7	–	1	1	–	7	–	1
Knoxville	1	–	6	–	0	2	–	6	–	0
Fisk	1	–	7	–	0	1	–	7	–	0
Bethune–Cookman	1	–	6	–	0	1	–	7	–	0
Allen	4	–	2	–	0	5	–	3	–	0
Lane	3	–	1	–	0	4	–	4	–	1
$ – Conference champion; Conference standings were based on Dickinson System ratings. Allen was ineligible, and Lane did not play a sufficient number of conference game to be rated.

The 1958 Florida A&M Rattlers football team was an American football team that represented Florida A&M University as a member of the Southern Intercollegiate Athletic Conference (SIAC) during the 1958 college football season. In their 14th season under head coach Jake Gaither, the Rattlers compiled a 7–2 record, won the SIAC championship, and outscored opponents by a total of 263 to 135. The team played its home games at Bragg Memorial Stadium in Tallahassee, Florida.

The Rattlers lost to undefeated black college national champion Prairie View A&M in the Orange Blossom Classic.

The team's statistical leaders included Leroy Hardee with 704 rushing yards, 99 receiving yards, and 52 points scored, and Lee Royster with 269 passing yards.

== Schedule ==
Date	Opponent	Site	Result	Attendance	Source
October 4	Benedict	Bragg Memorial Stadium; Tallahassee, FL	W 68–0	3,500	
October 18	at Morris Brown	Herndon Stadium; Atlanta, GA	W 13–12		
October 25	vs. Bethune–Cookman	Gator Bowl; Jacksonville, FL (Florida Classic)	W 29–0	12,873	
November 1	at South Carolina State	State College Stadium; Orangeburg, SC	W 28–8		
November 8	North Carolina A&T*^{†}	Bragg Memorial Stadium; Tallahassee, FL	W 37–22	11,000	
November 15	Allen	Bragg Memorial Stadium; Tallahassee, FL	W 52–14	4,000	
November 22	at Southern*	University Stadium; Baton Rouge, LA	L 6–35		
November 29	Texas Southern*	Bragg Memorial Stadium; Tallahassee, FL	W 22–18		
December 13	vs. Prairie View A&M*	Burdine Stadium; Miami, FL (Orange Blossom Classic)	L 8–26	39,426	
*Non-conference game; ^{†}Homecoming; Source:
