= 1959 Florida A&M Rattlers football team =

American college football season

1959 Florida A&M Rattlers football

Black college national champion SIAC champion

Orange Blossom Classic, W 28–7 vs. Prairie View A&M
- Conference: Southern Intercollegiate Athletic Conference
- Record: 10–0 (5–0 SIAC)
- Head coach: Jake Gaither (15th season)
- Home stadium: Bragg Memorial Stadium

1959 Southern Intercollegiate Athletic Conference football standings
	Conf.					Overall
Team	W		L		T	W		L		T
No. 13 Florida A&M $	5	–	0	–	0	10	–	0	–	0
Morehouse	5	–	1	–	0	5	–	2	–	1
Clark (GA)	3	–	1	–	2	5	–	1	–	2
Morris Brown	4	–	2	–	0	6	–	3	–	0
Alabama State	4	–	2	–	1	4	–	2	–	2
Bethune–Cookman	4	–	2	–	0	6	–	2	–	0
Knoxville	4	–	2	–	0	4	–	3	–	0
South Carolina State	3	–	3	–	0	4	–	5	–	0
Lane	3	–	2	–	0	4	–	4	–	0
Tuskegee	2	–	4	–	1	4	–	4	–	1
Benedict	2	–	4	–	0	5	–	5	–	0
Xavier (LA)	2	–	4	–	0	3	–	5	–	0
Allen	1	–	3	–	1	2	–	5	–	2
Fort Valley State	1	–	3	–	1	5	–	3	–	1
Fisk	1	–	5	–	0	3	–	5	–	0
Alabama A&M	0	–	6	–	0	1	–	7	–	0
$ – Conference champion; Standings were based on Dickinson System ratings.

The 1959 Florida A&M Rattlers football team was an American football team that represented Florida A&M University as a member of the Southern Intercollegiate Athletic Conference (SIAC) during the 1959 college football season. In their 15th season under head coach Jake Gaither, the Rattlers compiled a perfect 10–0 record, including a victory over Prairie View A&M in the Orange Blossom Classic for the black college football national championship. The team was ranked No. 14 in the final UPI small college poll. The team played its home games at Bragg Memorial Stadium in Tallahassee, Florida.

The team's statistical leaders included Clarence Childs with 537 rushing yards, Theodore Richardson with 354 passing yards, and Williams Barber with 116 receiving yards.

== Schedule ==
Date	Opponent	Rank	Site	Result	Attendance	Source
October 3	Benedict		Bragg Memorial Stadium; Tallahassee, FL	W 74–0		
October 10	Wiley*		Bragg Memorial Stadium; Tallahassee, FL	W 64–0		
October 17	Morris Brown		Bragg Memorial Stadium; Tallahassee, FL	W 6–0		
October 24	vs. Bethune–Cookman		Gator Bowl; Jacksonville, FL (Florida Classic)	W 68–6		
October 31	South Carolina State^{†}		Bragg Memorial Stadium; Tallahassee, FL	W 34–12		
November 7	at North Carolina A&T*		World War Memorial Stadium; Greensboro, NC	W 28–16		
November 14	Allen	No. 20	Hurst Alumni Stadium; Columbia, SC	W 52–8		
November 21	Southern*		Bragg Memorial Stadium; Tallahassee, FL	W 21–14		
November 28	at Texas Southern*	No. 14	Jeppesen Stadium; Houston, TX	W 36–8		
December 5	vs. Prairie View A&M*	No. 14	Miami Orange Bowl; Miami, FL (Orange Blossom Classic)	W 28–7	43,645	
*Non-conference game; ^{†}Homecoming; Rankings from AP Poll released prior to the game; Source:
