= 1959 Jackson State Tigers football team =

American college football season

1959 Jackson State Tigers football
- Conference: Southwestern Athletic Conference
- Record: 6–4 (4–3 SWAC)
- Head coach: John Merritt (8th season)
- Home stadium: Alumni Field

1959 Southwestern Athletic Conference football standings
	Conf.					Overall
Team		W		L			W		L
Southern $	7	–	0	–	0	8	–	2	–	0
No. 16 Prairie View A&M	6	–	1	–	0	9	–	2	–	0
Texas Southern	5	–	2	–	0	7	–	3	–	0
Jackson State	4	–	3	–	0	6	–	4	–	0
Arkansas AM&N	2	–	5	–	0	4	–	6	–	0
Grambling	2	–	5	–	0	4	–	6	–	0
Texas College	2	–	5	–	0	4	–	6	–	0
Wiley	0	–	7	–	0	2	–	8	–	0
$ – Conference champion; Rankings from NAIA poll

The 1959 Jackson State Tigers football team represented Jackson College for Negro Teachers (now known as Jackson State University) as a member of the Southwestern Athletic Conference (SWAC) during the 1959 college football season. Led by eighth-year head coach John Merritt, the Tigers compiled an overall record of 6–4, with a mark of 4–3 in conference play, and finished fourth in the SWAC.

== Schedule ==
Date	Opponent	Site	Result	Source
September 26	at Prairie View A&M	Edward L. Blackshear Field; Prairie View, TX	L 6–52	
October 3	at Mississippi Vocational*	Magnolia Stadium; Itta Bena, MS	W 46–0	
October 10	at Arkansas AM&N	Pumphrey Stadium; Pine Bluff, AR	W 18–12	
October 17	Alcorn A&M	Alumni Field; Jackson, MS (rivalry)	W 21–12	
October 24	Southern	Alumni Field; Jackson, MS (rivalry)	L 9–22	
October 31	Grambling	Alumni Field; Jackson, MS	W 14–13	
November 7	Wiley	Alumni Field; Jackson, MS	W 48–14	
November 14	at Texas Southern	Jeppesen Stadium; Houston, TX	L 8–20	
November 21	at Texas College	Steer Stadium; Tyler, TX	W 55–18	
November 26	at Tennessee A&I*	Hale Stadium; Nashville, TN (rivalry)	L 6–26	
*Non-conference game
