= Charles Spearman (American football) =

American football and baseball coach (1913–2000)

Biographical details
- Born: January 14, 1913; Arkansas, U.S.
- Died: September 8, 2000 (aged 87); Pine Bluff, Arkansas, U.S.

Playing career

Football
- c. 1937: LeMoyne

Coaching career (HC unless noted)

Football
- 1947–1949: LeMoyne
- 1951–1956: Arkansas AM&N (line)
- 1957–1961: Arkansas AM&N

Basketball
- 1947–1950: LeMoyne

Baseball
- ?–1977: Arkansas AM&N / Arkansas–Pine Bluff

Head coaching record
- Overall: 27–41–3 (football)
- Bowls: 0–1

Charles Derone "Bo" Spearman (January 14, 1913 – September 8, 2000) was an American college football, college basketball, and college baseball coach. He served as the head football at Arkansas Agricultural, Mechanical & Normal College (Arkansas AM&N)—now known as the University of Arkansas at Pine Bluff—from 1957 to 1961, compiling a record of 19–29–1. Spearman was the line coach at Arkansas AM&N before succeeding Leroy Moore as head football coach after the 1956 season. He resigned as head football coach following the 1961 season.

== Head coaching record ==
=== Football ===
Year	Team	Overall	Conference	Standing	Bowl/playoffs
LeMoyne Magicians (Southern Intercollegiate Athletic Conference) (1947–1949)
1947	LeMoyne	4–1–1	2–1	4th	
1948	LeMoyne	0–7–1	0–4	15th	
1949	LeMoyne	4–4	2–3	10th	
LeMoyne:		8–12–2	4–8		
Arkansas AM&N Golden Lions (Southwest Athletic Conference) (1956–1961)
1957	Arkansas AM&N	3–6	2–4	5th	
1958	Arkansas AM&N	3–6	0–5	6th	
1959	Arkansas AM&N	4–6	2–5	T–5th	
1960	Arkansas AM&N	6–5	3–4	5th	L Prairie View
1961	Arkansas AM&N	3–6–1	1–5–1	7th	
Arkansas AM&N:		19–29–1	8–23–1		
Total:		27–41–3			
