= 1959 Prairie View A&M Panthers football team =

American college football season

1959 Prairie View A&M Panthers football

Orange Blossom Classic L 7–28 vs. Florida A&M Prairie View Bowl W 47–10 vs. Wiley
- Conference: Southwestern Athletic Conference
- Record: 9–2 (6–1 SWAC)
- Head coach: Billy Nicks (11th season)
- Home stadium: Edward L. Blackshear Field

1959 Southwestern Athletic Conference football standings
| | Conf. | | | | | Overall |
| Team | | W | | L | | | W | | L |
|---|---|---|---|---|---|---|---|---|---|---|
| Southern $ | 7 | – | 0 | – | 0 | 8 | – | 2 | – | 0 |
| No. 16 Prairie View A&M | 6 | – | 1 | – | 0 | 9 | – | 2 | – | 0 |
| Texas Southern | 5 | – | 2 | – | 0 | 7 | – | 3 | – | 0 |
| Jackson State | 4 | – | 3 | – | 0 | 6 | – | 4 | – | 0 |
| Arkansas AM&N | 2 | – | 5 | – | 0 | 4 | – | 6 | – | 0 |
| Grambling | 2 | – | 5 | – | 0 | 4 | – | 6 | – | 0 |
| Texas College | 2 | – | 5 | – | 0 | 4 | – | 6 | – | 0 |
| Wiley | 0 | – | 7 | – | 0 | 2 | – | 8 | – | 0 |
$ – Conference champion; Rankings from NAIA poll

The 1959 Prairie View A&M Panthers football team represented Prairie View A&M College of Texas (now known as Prairie View A&M University) as a member of the Southwestern Athletic Conference (SWAC) during the 1959 college football season. Led by 11th-year head coach Billy Nicks, the Panthers compiled an overall record of 9–2, with a mark of 6–1 in conference play, and finished second in the SWAC.

== Schedule ==
| Date | Opponent | Site | Result | Attendance | Source |
|---|---|---|---|---|---|
| September 26 | Jackson State | Edward L. Blackshear Field; Prairie View, TX | W 52–6 | | |
| October 10 | Allen* | Edward L. Blackshear Field; Prairie View, TX | W 67–12 | | |
| October 19 | vs. Texas Southern | Cotton Bowl; Dallas, TX (State Fair Classic, rivalry) | W 34–15 | 10,000 | |
| October 26 | vs. Grambling | State Fair Stadium; Shreveport, LA (State Fair Classic) | W 35–6 | 9,500 | |
| October 31 | at Arkansas AM&N | Pumphrey Stadium; Pine Bluff, AR | W 29–0 | | |
| November 7 | at Texas College | Steer Field; Tyler, TX | W 23–11 | 2,000 | |
| November 14 | at Mississippi Vocational* | Magnolia Stadium; Itta Bena, MS | W 36–0 | | |
| November 21 | Wiley* | Edward L. Blackshear Field; Prairie View, TX | W 21–12 | | |
| November 28 | at Southern | University Stadium; Baton Rouge, LA | L 6–20 | | |
| December 5 | vs. Florida A&M* | Burdine Stadium; Miami, FL (Orange Blossom Classic) | L 7–28 | 43,645 | |
| January 1 | vs. Wiley | Jeppesen Stadium; Houston, TX (Prairie View Bowl) | W 47–10 | 1,200 | |
*Non-conference game
