= 1955 Langston Lions football team =

American college football season

1955 Langston Lions football
- Conference: Southwestern Athletic Conference
- Record: 6–1–2 (4–1–2 SWAC)
- Head coach: Caesar Felton Gayles (26th season)
- Home stadium: Anderson Field

1955 Southwestern Athletic Conference football standings
| | Conf. | | | | | Overall |
| Team | W | | L | | T | W | | L | | T |
|---|---|---|---|---|---|---|---|---|---|---|
| No. 5 Southern $ | 6 | – | 1 | – | 0 | 7 | – | 2 | – | 1 |
| No. 10 Prairie View A&M | 5 | – | 1 | – | 1 | 8 | – | 2 | – | 1 |
| No. 8 Texas Southern | 5 | – | 1 | – | 1 | 7 | – | 2 | – | 1 |
| No. 6 Langston | 4 | – | 1 | – | 2 | 6 | – | 1 | – | 2 |
| Texas College | 2 | – | 5 | – | 0 | 3 | – | 6 | – | 0 |
| Wiley | 2 | – | 5 | – | 0 | 3 | – | 7 | – | 0 |
| Arkansas AM&N | 2 | – | 5 | – | 0 | 2 | – | 8 | – | 0 |
| Bishop | 0 | – | 7 | – | 0 | 0 | – | 10 | – | 0 |
$ – Conference champion; Rankings from the Pittsburgh Courier.

The 1955 Langston Lions football team represented Langston University as a member of the Southwestern Athletic Conference (SWAC) during the 1955 college football season. In their 26th season under head coach Caesar Felton Gayles, the Lions compiled an overall record of 6–1–2 with a mark of 4–1–2 in conference play, placing fourth in the SWAC.

== Schedule ==
| Date | Time | Opponent | Site | Result | Attendance | Source |
|---|---|---|---|---|---|---|
| September 24 | 8:00 p.m. | at Bishop | Wiley College Stadium; Marshall, TX | W 46–0 | | |
| October 1 | | Tennessee A&I* | Langston, OK | W 3–0 | 3,000 | |
| October 8 | | at Texas College | Steer Stadium; Tyler, TX | W 7–0 | | |
| October 15 | | vs. Lincoln (MO)* | Municipal Stadium; Kansas City, MO | W 22–0 | 6,500–7,000 | |
| October 22 | | Southern | Anderson Field; Langston, OK | L 0–7 | | |
| October 29 | 2:00 p.m. | vs. Texas Southern | Farrington Field; Fort Worth, TX | T 20–20 | 3,000 | |
| November 5 | 2:00 p.m. | Wiley^{†} | Anderson Field; Langston, OK | W 6–0 | | |
| November 12 | | at Arkansas AM&N | Pine Bluff, AR | W 14–6 | | |
| November 19 | | at Prairie View A&M | Blackshear Field; Prairie View, TX | T 19–19 | | |
*Non-conference game; ^{†}Homecoming; All times are in Central time
