= 1945 Wiley Wildcats football team =

American college football season

1945 Wiley Wildcats football

Black college national champion SWAC champion

Orange Blossom Classic, W 32–6 vs. Florida A&M
- Conference: Southwestern Athletic Conference
- Record: 10–0 (6–0 SWAC)
- Head coach: Fred T. Long (23rd season)

1945 Southwestern Athletic Conference football standings
	Conf.					Overall
Team	W		L		T	W		L		T
Wiley $	6	–	0	–	0	10	–	0	–	0
Southern	5	–	1	–	0	6	–	3	–	1
Texas College	3	–	2	–	1	7	–	3	–	1
Langston	3	–	3	–	0	5	–	3	–	0
Samuel Huston	1	–	3	–	2	?	–	?	–	?
Prairie View	1	–	4	–	1	3	–	5	–	1
Arkansas AM&N	1	–	5	–	0	2	–	6	–	0
$ – Conference champion

The 1945 Wiley Wildcats football team was an American football team that represented Wiley College in the Southwestern Athletic Conference (SWAC) during the 1945 college football season. In their 23rd season under head coach Fred T. Long, the Wildcats compiled a 10–0 record (6–0 against SWAC opponents), defeated Florida A&M in the Orange Blossom Classic, won the SWAC championship, shut out seven of ten opponents, and outscored all opponents by a total of 356 to 19. The Wiley team was also recognized as the 1945 black college national champion.

Assistant coach Harry Long, the brother of head coach Fred T. Long, suffered a heart attack in the first quarter of the Orange Blossom Classic. He died in an ambulance en route to a hospital. The victory sealed the Wildcats' national championship, but, after the game, the team sprawled out on the bench and the ground and wept over the Long's death.

== Schedule ==
Date	Opponent	Site	Result	Attendance	Source
September 29	Philander Smith*	Wiley Field; Marshall, TX	W 53–0		
October 6	at Arkansas AM&N	Athletic Field; Pine Bluff, AR	W 31–0		
October 15	vs. Prairie View	Cotton Bowl; Dallas, TX	W 35–7	19,000	
October 20	Tillotson*	Wiley Field; Marshall, TX	W 62–0		
October 29	vs. Randolph Field*	State Fair Stadium; Shreveport, LA	W 26–0	2,000	
November 10	Langston^{†}	Wiley Field; Marshall, TX	W 20–0	3,000	
November 17	vs. Southern	Buffalo Stadium; Houston, TX	W 33–0	6,000	
November 24	Samuel Huston	Anderson Field; Austin, TX	W 58–0		
December 1	Texas College	Wiley Field; Marshall, TX	W 8–6		
December 8	vs. Florida A&M*	Phillips Field; Tampa, FL (Orange Blossom Classic)	W 32–6	8,000	
*Non-conference game; ^{†}Homecoming
