= 1955 Tennessee A&I Tigers football team =

American college football season

1955 Tennessee A&I Tigers football
- Conference: Midwest Athletic Association
- Record: 7–2 (3–1 MWAA)
- Head coach: Howard C. Gentry (1st season)
- Home stadium: Hale Stadium

1955 Midwest Athletic Association football standings
	Conf.					Overall
Team	W		L		T	W		L		T
No. 1 Grambling $	2	–	0	–	0	10	–	0	–	0
No. 6 Tennessee A&I	3	–	1	–	0	7	–	2	–	0
No. 10 Lincoln (MO)	3	–	1	–	0	5	–	3	–	0
No. 11 Kentucky State	2	–	2	–	0	7	–	2	–	0
Jackson	0	–	3	–	0	5	–	4	–	0
Central State (OH)	0	–	3	–	0	4	–	4	–	0
$ – Conference champion; Rankings from Associated Negro Press

The 1955 Tennessee A&I Tigers football team represented Tennessee Agricultural & Industrial State College as a member of the Midwest Athletic Association (MWAA) during the 1955 college football season. In their first season under head coach Howard C. Gentry, the Tigers compiled a 7–2 record and outscored all opponents by a total of 245 to 84. Tennessee A&I was ranked No. 4 in the Pittsburgh Courier final rankings of black college football teams.

== Schedule ==
Date	Opponent	Site	Result	Attendance	Source
September 17	vs. Lincoln (MO)	Melrose Stadium; Memphis, TN	W 7–0	5,200	
September 24	Virginia State*	Hale Stadium; Nashville, TN	W 12–7		
October 1	Langston*	Langston, OK	L 0–3	3,000	
October 8	at Grambling	Grambling, LA	L 0–12		
October 15	Paul Quinn*	Hale Stadium; Nashville, TN	W 85–0		
October 22	Central State (OH)	Hale Stadium; Nashville, TN	W 52–12		
November 5	Texas Southern*	Hale Stadium; Nashville, TN	W 38–14	3,500	
November 12	at Alcorn A&M*	Lorman, MS	W 26–18		
November 24	Kentucky State	Nashville, TN	W 25–18		
*Non-conference game
