= 1955 Grambling Tigers football team =

American college football season

1955 Grambling Tigers football

Black college national champion MWAAchampion

Orange Blossom Classic, W 28–21 vs. Florida A&M
- Conference: Midwest Athletic Association
- Record: 10–0 (2–0 MWAA)
- Head coach: Eddie Robinson (13th season)
- Home stadium: Grambling Stadium

1955 Midwest Athletic Association football standings
	Conf.					Overall
Team	W		L		T	W		L		T
No. 1 Grambling $	2	–	0	–	0	10	–	0	–	0
No. 6 Tennessee A&I	3	–	1	–	0	7	–	2	–	0
No. 10 Lincoln (MO)	3	–	1	–	0	5	–	3	–	0
No. 11 Kentucky State	2	–	2	–	0	7	–	2	–	0
Jackson	0	–	3	–	0	5	–	4	–	0
Central State (OH)	0	–	3	–	0	4	–	4	–	0
$ – Conference champion; Rankings from Associated Negro Press

The 1955 Grambling Tigers football team represented Grambling State University as a member of the Midwest Athletic Association (MWAA) during the 1955 college football season. In their 13th season under head coach Eddie Robinson, the Tigers compiled a perfect 10–0 record, won the MWAA championship, upset Florida A&M in the Orange Blossom Classic, and outscored opponents by a total of 330 to 54. The team was recognized by the Pittsburgh Courier as the black college football national champion for 1955.

== Schedule ==
Date	Opponent	Site	Result	Attendance	Source
September 17	Paul Quinn*	Grambling Stadium; Grambling, LA	W 30–0		
September 24	at Alcorn A&M*	Henderson Stadium; Lorman, MS	W 13–6		
October 8	Tennessee A&I	Grambling Stadium; Grambling, LA	W 12–0		
October 15	vs. Bishop*	Wildcat Stadium; Lake Charles, LA	W 80–0		
October 24	vs. Wiley*	State Fair Stadium; Shreveport, LA	W 20–0		
October 29	Jackson State	Alumni Field; Jackson, MS	W 48–7		
November 5	Bethune–Cookman*	Grambling Stadium; Grambling, LA	W 26–7	10,000	
November 12	at Prairie View A&M*	Prairie View, TX	W 26–7		
November 19	Arkansas AM&N*	Grambling Stadium; Grambling, LA	W 38–6		
December 3	vs. Florida A&M*	Burdine Stadium; Miami, FL (Orange Blossom Classic)	W 28–21	40,319	
*Non-conference game
