= 1959 Wiley Wildcats football team =

American college football season

1959 Wiley Wildcats football

Prairie View Bowl, L 10–47 vs. Prairie View A&M
- Conference: Southwestern Athletic Conference
- Record: 2–9 (0–7 SWAC)
- Head coach: Fred T. Long (29th season)
- Home stadium: Wiley Field

1959 Southwestern Athletic Conference football standings
	Conf.					Overall
Team		W		L			W		L
Southern $	7	–	0	–	0	8	–	2	–	0
No. 16 Prairie View A&M	6	–	1	–	0	9	–	2	–	0
Texas Southern	5	–	2	–	0	7	–	3	–	0
Jackson State	4	–	3	–	0	6	–	4	–	0
Arkansas AM&N	2	–	5	–	0	4	–	6	–	0
Grambling	2	–	5	–	0	4	–	6	–	0
Texas College	2	–	5	–	0	4	–	6	–	0
Wiley	0	–	7	–	0	2	–	8	–	0
$ – Conference champion; Rankings from NAIA poll

The 1959 Wiley Wildcats football team represented Wiley College as a member of the Southwestern Athletic Conference (SWAC) during the 1959 college football season. Led by 29th-year head coach Fred T. Long, the Wildcats compiled an overall record of 2–9, with a conference record of 0–7, and finished eighth in the SWAC.

== Schedule ==
Date	Opponent	Site	Result	Attendance	Source
September 26	at Bishop*	P.C. Cobb Stadium; Dallas, TX	W 47–7		
October 3	Alcorn A&M*	Wiley Field; Marshall, TX	W 16–6		
October 10	at Florida A&M*	Bragg Memorial Stadium; Tallahassee, FL	L 0–64		
October 17	vs. Grambling	State Fair Stadium; Shreveport, LA	L 20–42	1,000	
October 24	at Arkansas AM&N	Pumphrey Stadium; Pine Bluff, AR	L 13–24		
October 31	Texas Southern	Wiley Field; Marshall, TX	L 0–23		
November 7	at Jackson State	Alumni Field; Jackson, MS	L 14–48		
November 14	Southern	Wiley Field; Marshall, TX	L 6–18		
November 21	at Prairie View A&M	Edward L. Blackshear Field; Prairie View, TX	L 12–21		
November 26	Texas College	Wiley Field; Marshall, TX	L 20–22		
January 1	vs. Prairie View A&M	Jeppesen Stadium; Houston, TX (Prairie View Bowl)	L 10–47	1,200	
*Non-conference game
