= 1959 Texas Southern Tigers football team =

American college football season

1959 Texas Southern Tigers football
- Conference: Southwestern Athletic Conference
- Record: 7–3 (5–2 SWAC)
- Head coach: Alexander Durley (11th season)
- Home stadium: Jeppesen Stadium

1959 Southwestern Athletic Conference football standings
	Conf.					Overall
Team		W		L			W		L
Southern $	7	–	0	–	0	8	–	2	–	0
No. 16 Prairie View A&M	6	–	1	–	0	9	–	2	–	0
Texas Southern	5	–	2	–	0	7	–	3	–	0
Jackson State	4	–	3	–	0	6	–	4	–	0
Arkansas AM&N	2	–	5	–	0	4	–	6	–	0
Grambling	2	–	5	–	0	4	–	6	–	0
Texas College	2	–	5	–	0	4	–	6	–	0
Wiley	0	–	7	–	0	2	–	8	–	0
$ – Conference champion; Rankings from NAIA poll

The 1959 Texas Southern Tigers football team was an American football team that represented Texas Southern University as a member of the Southwestern Athletic Conference (SWAC) during the 1959 college football season. Led by 11th-year head coach Alexander Durley, the Tigers compiled an overall record of 7–3, with a mark of 5–2 in conference play, and finished third in the SWAC.

== Schedule ==
Date	Opponent	Site	Result	Attendance	Source
September 19	vs. Langston*	Public School Stadium; Galveston, TX	W 19–14		
September 26	at Southern	University Stadium; Baton Rouge, LA	L 8–32		
October 5	Brooke Army Medical Center*	Jeppesen Stadium; Houston, TX	W 27–14		
October 19	vs. Prairie View A&M	Cotton Bowl; Dallas, TX (State Fair Classic, rivalry)	L 15–34	10,000	
October 31	at Wiley	Wildcat Stadium; Marshall, TX	W 23–0		
November 7	at Grambling	Grambling Stadium; Grambling, LA	W 15–14		
November 14	Jackson State	Jeppesen Stadium; Houston, TX	W 20–8		
November 21	Arkansas AM&N	Jeppesen Stadium; Houston, TX	W 13–8		
November 28	No. 14 Florida A&M*	Jeppesen Stadium; Houston, TX	L 8–36		
December 5	Texas College	Jeppesen Stadium; Houston, TX	W 22–6		
*Non-conference game; Rankings from UPI Poll released prior to the game
