= 1958 Tennessee A&I Tigers football team =

American college football season

1958 Tennessee A&I Tigers football
- Conference: Midwest Athletic Association
- Record: 4–4 (2–2 MWAA)
- Head coach: Howard C. Gentry (4th season)
- Home stadium: Hale Stadium

1958 Midwest Athletic Association football standings
	Conf.					Overall
Team	W		L		T	W		L		T
No. 5 Lincoln (MO) $	3	–	0	–	0	7	–	1	–	0
No. 8 Jackson State	2	–	0	–	0	6	–	2	–	1
No. 14 Tennessee A&I	2	–	1	–	0	4	–	4	–	0
Central State (OH)	1	–	2	–	0	5	–	2	–	0
Kentucky State	0	–	3	–	0	0	–	7	–	1
$ – Conference champion; Rankings from Pittsburgh Courier

The 1958 Tennessee A&I Tigers football team represented Tennessee Agricultural & Industrial State College (now known as Tennessee State University) as a member of the Midwest Athletic Association (MWAA) during the 1958 college football season. Led by fourth-year head coach Howard C. Gentry, the Tigers compiled an overall record of 4–4, with a 2–2 conference record, and finished third in the MWAA.

== Schedule ==
Date	Opponent	Site	Result	Attendance	Source
September 27	at North Carolina A&T*	World War Memorial Stadium; Greensboro, NC	W 23–6	6,500	
October 4	Morris Brown*	Hale Stadium; Nashville, TN	W 32–6	5,000	
October 11	at Grambling*	Grambling Stadium; Grambling, LA	L 6–7	12,000	
October 25	at Central State (OH)	McPherson Stadium; Wilberforce, OH	W 20–6		
November 8	Southern*	Hale Stadium; Nashville, TN	L 14–23	6,000	
November 15	Lincoln (MO)	Hale Stadium; Nashville, TN	L 12–24	4,000	
November 22	at Jackson State	Alumni Field; Jackson, MS	L 13–18		
November 27	Kentucky State	Hale Stadium; Nashville, TN	W 19–6		
*Non-conference game
