= 1945 Southern Jaguars football team =

American college football season

1945 Southern Jaguars football
- Conference: Southwestern Athletic Conference
- Record: 6–3–1 (5–1 SWAC)
- Head coach: Ace Mumford (10th season)
- Home stadium: University Stadium

1945 Southwestern Athletic Conference football standings
	Conf.					Overall
Team	W		L		T	W		L		T
Wiley $	6	–	0	–	0	10	–	0	–	0
Southern	5	–	1	–	0	6	–	3	–	1
Texas College	3	–	2	–	1	7	–	3	–	1
Langston	3	–	3	–	0	5	–	3	–	0
Samuel Huston	1	–	3	–	2	?	–	?	–	?
Prairie View	1	–	4	–	1	3	–	5	–	1
Arkansas AM&N	1	–	5	–	0	2	–	6	–	0
$ – Conference champion

The 1945 Southern Jaguars football team was an American football team that represented Southern University as a member of the Southwestern Athletic Conference (SWAC) during the 1945 college football season. In their 10th season under head coach Ace Mumford, the Jaguars compiled a 6–3–1 record and outscored opponents by a total of 195 to 111.

The team played its home games at University Stadium in Scotlandville, Louisiana (which has since been annexed into the Baton Rouge city limits).

== Schedule ==
Date	Opponent	Site	Result	Attendance	Source
September 29	MacDill Field*	University Stadium; Scotlandville, LA	T 0–0		
October 6	Jackson Barracks*	University Stadium; Scotlandville, LA	W 27–0		
October 12	vs. Samuel Huston	Buffalo Stadium; Houston, TX	W 30–0		
October 20	Arkansas AM&N	University Stadium; Scotlandville, LA	W 45–0		
October 27	at Langston	Anderson Field; Langston, OK	W 20–6	3,000	
November 3	Texas College	University Stadium; Scotlandville, LA	W 6–0		
November 10	at Tennessee A&I*	Nashville, TN	L 0–33		
November 17	vs. Wiley	Buffalo Stadium; Houston, TX	L 0–33	6,000	
November 23	Godman Field*	University Stadium; Scotlandville, LA	L 21–33		
December 1	Prairie View	University Stadium; Scotlandville, LA	W 46–6		
*Non-conference game
