= 1958 Prairie View A&M Panthers football team =

American college football season

1958 Prairie View A&M Panthers football

Black college national champion

Orange Blossom Classic, W 26–8 vs. Florida A&M Prairie View Bowl, W 34–8 vs. Langston
- Conference: Southwestern Athletic Conference
- Record: 10–0–1 (5–0 SWAC)
- Head coach: Billy Nicks (10th season)
- Home stadium: Blackshear Field; Jeppesen Stadium

1958 Southwestern Athletic Conference football standings
	Conf.					Overall
Team	W		L		T	W		L		T
Prairie View A&M $	5	–	0	–	0	10	–	0	–	1
Southern	3	–	2	–	0	8	–	2	–	0
Texas College	3	–	2	–	0	5	–	4	–	0
Texas Southern	2	–	3	–	0	5	–	5	–	0
Wiley	2	–	3	–	0	5	–	5	–	0
Arkansas AM&N	0	–	5	–	0	3	–	6	–	0
$ – Conference champion

The 1958 Prairie View A&M Panthers football team was an American football team that represented Prairie View A&M University in the Southwestern Athletic Conference (SWAC) during the 1958 college football season. In their tenth season under head coach Billy Nicks, the Panthers compiled a 10–0–1 record, won the SWAC championship, and outscored opponents by a total of 369 to 101. In two post-season games, they defeated Florida A&M in the Orange Blossom Classic and Langston in the Prairie View Bowl. The Panthers were recognized as the 1958 black college national champion.

== Schedule ==
Date	Opponent	Site	Result	Attendance	Source
September 20	at Fort Hood*	Fort Hood Stadium; Killeen, TX	W 53–0	7,000	
September 27	at Jackson State*	Alumni Field; Jackson, MS	T 14–14		
October 13	vs. Texas Southern	Cotton Bowl; Dallas, TX (State Fair Classic, rivalry)	W 26–19	10,000	
October 25	at Grambling*	Grambling Stadium; Grambling, LA	W 44–6		
November 1	Arkansas AM&N	Blackshear Field; Prairie View, TX	W 37–13	4,000	
November 8	Texas College	Blackshear Field; Prairie View, TX	W 43–0		
November 15	Mississippi Vocational*	Blackshear Field; Prairie View, TX	W 59–19	3,500	
November 22	at Wiley	Wiley Field; Marshall, TX	W 13–0		
November 29	Southern	Jeppesen Stadium; Houston, TX	W 20–14		
December 13	vs. Florida A&M*	Burdine Stadium; Miami, FL (Orange Blossom Classic)	W 26–8	39,426	
January 1, 1959	vs. Langston*	Jeppesen Stadium; Houston, TX (Prairie View Bowl)	W 34–8		
*Non-conference game
