= 1958 Arkansas AM&N Golden Lions football team =

American college football season

1958 Arkansas AM&N Golden Lions football
- Conference: Southwestern Athletic Conference
- Record: 3–6 (0–5 SWAC)
- Head coach: Charles Spearman (2nd season)
- Home stadium: Pumphrey Stadium

1958 Southwestern Athletic Conference football standings
	Conf.					Overall
Team	W		L		T	W		L		T
Prairie View A&M $	5	–	0	–	0	10	–	0	–	1
Southern	3	–	2	–	0	8	–	2	–	0
Texas College	3	–	2	–	0	5	–	4	–	0
Texas Southern	2	–	3	–	0	5	–	5	–	0
Wiley	2	–	3	–	0	5	–	5	–	0
Arkansas AM&N	0	–	5	–	0	3	–	6	–	0
$ – Conference champion

The 1958 Arkansas AM&N Golden Lions football team represented the Arkansas Agricultural, Mechanical and Normal College (now known as the University of Arkansas at Pine Bluff) as a member of the Southwestern Athletic Conference (SWAC) during the 1958 college football season. Led by second-year head coach Charles Spearman, the Golden Lions compiled an overall record of 3–6, with a conference record of 0–5, and finished sixth in the SWAC.

== Schedule ==
Date	Opponent	Site	Result	Source
September 27	at Lincoln (MO)*	Lincoln Field; Jefferson City, MO	L 19–34	
October 4	at Texas College	Steer Stadium; Tyler, TX	L 0–20	
October 11	at Wiley	Wiley Field; Marshall, TX	L 6–32	
October 18	at Southern	University Stadium; Baton Rouge, LA	L 0–34	
October 25	Mississippi Industrial*	Pumphrey Stadium; Pine Bluff, AR	W 28–14	
November 1	at Prairie View A&M	Blackshear Field; Prairie View, TX	L 13–37	
November 8	Alcorn A&M*	Pumphrey Stadium; Pine Bluff, AR	W 28–6	
November 15	at Grambling*	Grambling Stadium; Grambling, LA	W 7–6	
November 22	Texas Southern	Pumphrey Stadium; Pine Bluff, AR	L 0–40	
*Non-conference game
