= 1945 Prairie View Panthers football team =

American college football season

1945 Prairie View Panthers football

Prairie View Bowl, W 12–0 vs. Tuskegee
- Conference: Southwestern Athletic Conference
- Record: 3–5–1 (1–4–1 SWAC)
- Head coach: Billy Nicks (1st season)
- Home stadium: Blackshear Field

1945 Southwestern Athletic Conference football standings
	Conf.					Overall
Team	W		L		T	W		L		T
Wiley $	6	–	0	–	0	10	–	0	–	0
Southern	5	–	1	–	0	6	–	3	–	1
Texas College	3	–	2	–	1	7	–	3	–	1
Langston	3	–	3	–	0	5	–	3	–	0
Samuel Huston	1	–	3	–	2	?	–	?	–	?
Prairie View	1	–	4	–	1	3	–	5	–	1
Arkansas AM&N	1	–	5	–	0	2	–	6	–	0
$ – Conference champion

The 1945 Prairie View Panthers football team was an American football team that represented Prairie View State Normal & Industrial College (now known as Prairie View A&M University) as a member of the Southwestern Athletic Conference (SWAC) during the 1945 college football season. In their first season under head coach Billy Nicks, the Panthers compiled an overall record of 3–5–1, with a mark of 1–4–1 in conference play, and finished sixth in the SWAC.

== Schedule ==
Date	Opponent	Site	Result	Attendance	Source
September 29	Samuel Huston	Blackshear Field; Prairie View, TX	T 0–0		
October 15	vs. Wiley	Cotton Bowl; Dallas, TX	L 7–35	19,000	
October 27	at Arkansas AM&N	Athletic Field; Pine Bluff, AR	W 20–0		
November 3	Tillotson*		W 16–13		
November 9	vs. Texas College	Buffalo Stadium; Houston, TX	L 0–12		
November 17	at Samuel Huston	Austin, TX	L 8–12		
November 24	Langston^{†}	Blackshear Field; Prairie View, TX	L 13–27		
December 1	at Southern	University Stadium; Scotlandville, LA	L 6–46		
January 1	vs. Tuskegee*	Buffalo Stadium; Houston, TX (Prairie View Bowl)	W 12–0	10,000	
*Non-conference game; ^{†}Homecoming
