= 1958 Texas College Steers football team =

American college football season

1958 Texas College Steers football
- Conference: Southwestern Athletic Conference
- Record: 5–4 (3–2 SWAC)
- Head coach: Bo McMichael (2nd season)
- Home stadium: Steer Stadium

1958 Southwestern Athletic Conference football standings
	Conf.					Overall
Team	W		L		T	W		L		T
Prairie View A&M $	5	–	0	–	0	10	–	0	–	1
Southern	3	–	2	–	0	8	–	2	–	0
Texas College	3	–	2	–	0	5	–	4	–	0
Texas Southern	2	–	3	–	0	5	–	5	–	0
Wiley	2	–	3	–	0	5	–	5	–	0
Arkansas AM&N	0	–	5	–	0	3	–	6	–	0
$ – Conference champion

The 1958 Texas College Steers football team represented Texas College as a member of the Southwestern Athletic Conference (SWAC) during the 1958 college football season. Led by second-year head coach Bo McMichael, the Steers compiled an overall record of 5–4 and a mark of 3–2 in conference play, and finished tied for second in the SWAC.

== Schedule ==
Date	Opponent	Site	Result	Source
September 26	at Paul Quinn*	Jackson Stadium; Waco, TX	W 32–0	
October 4	Arkansas AM&N	Steer Stadium; Tyler, TX	W 22–0	
October 11	vs. Langston*	Farrington Field; Fort Worth, TX	L 6–22	
October 18	Texas Southern	Steer Stadium; Tyler, TX	W 13–12	
October 25	Dillard*	Steer Stadium; Tyler, TX	W 0–32	
November 1	Southern	Steer Stadium; Tyler, TX	W 13–6	
November 8	at Prairie View A&M	Blackshear Field; Prairie View, TX	L 0–43	
November 15	at Bishop*	Tiger Stadium; Marshall, TX	L 12–20	
November 27	Wiley	Steer Stadium; Tyler, TX	L 13–19	
*Non-conference game
