= Eddie Robinson (American football coach) =

American football coach (1919–2007)

- Robinson, c. 1980

Biographical details
- Born: February 13, 1919; Jackson, Louisiana, U.S.
- Died: April 3, 2007 (aged 88); Ruston, Louisiana, U.S.
- Education: Leland College; University of Iowa

Coaching career (HC unless noted)

Football
- 1941–1997: Grambling State

Basketball
- 1943–1956: Grambling State

Head coaching record
- Overall: 408–165–15 (football)
- Bowls: 10–6
- Tournaments: 0–3 (NCAA DI–AA playoffs)

Accomplishments and honors

Championships
- Football 9 black college national (1955, 1967, 1972, 1974–1975, 1977, 1980, 1983, 1992); 17 SWAC (1960, 1965–1968, 1971–1974, 1977–1980, 1983, 1985, 1989, 1994)
- College Football Hall of Fame; Inducted in 1997 (profile)

Eddie Gay Robinson Sr. (February 13, 1919 – April 3, 2007) was an American college football and basketball coach. For 56 years, from 1941 to 1942 and again from 1945 to 1997, he was the head coach at Grambling State University, a historically black university (HBCU) in Grambling, Louisiana. During a period in college football history when black players were not allowed to play for southern college programs, Robinson built Grambling State into a "small" college football powerhouse. He retired in 1997 with a record of 408–165–15.

Robinson was inducted into the College Football Hall of Fame in 1997. The Black College All Star Bowl award for outstanding NFL rookies, the Los Angeles Football Classic Foundation's HBCU championship award, and the Football Writers Association of America's Eddie Robinson Award are all named for him. Super Bowl XXXII, played at Qualcomm Stadium in San Diego, was dedicated to Robinson.

== Biography ==
Robinson was born in Jackson in East Feliciana Parish in South Louisiana, to the son of a sharecropper and a domestic worker. He graduated in 1937 from McKinley Senior High School in the capital city of Baton Rouge, Louisiana and briefly attended Southern University there. He then played quarterback and earned his bachelor's degree in English at unaccredited Leland College in Baker, Louisiana, before obtaining his master's degree in 1954 from the University of Iowa in Iowa City—at which he was a member of Alpha Phi Alpha fraternity.

== Career ==
Robinson began his coaching career at Louisiana Negro Normal and Industrial Institute (now Grambling State University). He applied for the job and was hired by the school's president and baseball coach, Ralph Waldo Emerson Jones. In his first year the team went 3–5–1, but the following season—during which he recruited new players and dismissed those who did not live up to his expectations—the Tigers had a perfect 9–0 season, going unbeaten, untied, and unscored upon.

Robinson returned to the field in 1945, and remained at the school, which became Grambling College in 1946 and Grambling State University in 1973, until his retirement in 1997. He retired as the career leader in wins (408) for a college football head coach before ultimately being surpassed by John Gagliardi (489) and Joe Paterno (409).

More than 200 of his players went on to play in the National Football League, American Football League, and Canadian Football League. Robinson coached three AFL players who would later be inducted to the Pro Football Hall of Fame: the Kansas City Chiefs' Buck Buchanan; the Oakland Raiders' Willie Brown; and the San Diego Chargers' Charlie Joiner. Robinson also coached James Harris, who with the AFL's Buffalo Bills became the first black quarterback in modern Pro Football history to start at that position in a season opener. He also coached Packers defensive end and Hall of Famer Willie Davis and the Super Bowl XXII MVP, Redskins quarterback Doug Williams, who would ultimately succeed Robinson as Grambling's head coach in 1998.

During his coaching career, Robinson compiled 45 winning seasons, including winning or sharing 17 Southwestern Athletic Conference championships and nine black college football national championships. He was winless in his three NCAA playoff appearances.

Enormous publicity attended Robinson's record-breaking win with Grambling State in 1985. Some observers feared that the coach would become the target of white hatred, much as Henry Aaron had when he broke Babe Ruth's home run record. Instead Robinson reported that he did not receive a single hate letter, even from the legion of southern fans who worshipped Bear Bryant. When asked if his record was somehow tarnished by the fact that his team played most of its games against Division I-AA caliber competition, Robinson told Sports Illustrated: "I grew up in the South. I was told where to attend elementary school, where to attend junior high school, where to attend high school. When I became a coach, I was told who I could recruit, who I could play, where I could play and when I could play. I did what I could within the system." He added that his philosophy had always been "whatever league you're in, whatever level, win there."

Eddie Robinson held several jobs other than football coach, including teaching at Grambling High School, and coaching the girls basketball team during World War II. His girls team lost the state championship by 1 point. He also coached boys basketball, baseball, directed the band, and was in charge of the cheerleaders—with a budget of $46.

In the days of segregation, Robinson had the pick of most of the good black high school football players in Louisiana, usually dividing them with Southern–a major reason why the game between the two schools was a major in-state rivalry long before it was moved to New Orleans as the Bayou Classic in 1974. He was able to maintain his success for much of the time after integration, recording just one losing season between 1960 and 1990. However, after three consecutive losing seasons in the mid-1990s, pressure mounted for the now 78-year old coach to resign. Fellow college coach Joe Paterno is quoted in the Grambling State press guide as saying, "Nobody has ever done or ever will do what Eddie Robinson has done for the game... Our profession will never, ever be able to repay Eddie Robinson for what he has done for the country and the profession of football."

In 1997 news escaped that Grambling was planning to dismiss him in mid-season. Public outcry—including condemnation from Louisiana elected officials like then-Gov. Mike Foster—led Grambling to retain Robinson's services through the remainder of the season.

Robinson developed Alzheimer's disease after his retirement. He died on April 3, 2007, at Lincoln General Hospital in Ruston, Louisiana, after having been admitted earlier in the day.

Robinson and his wife, Doris, who died at the age of ninety-six in September 2015, had two children; Eddie, Jr. and Lillian Rose Robinson.

== Awards and honors ==
In 1979 the Black College All Star Bowl committee named its award for outstanding NFL rookies from HBCUs the "Eddie G. Robinson Trophy;" its inaugural winner was Doug Williams. Grambling named its football facility, built in 1983, Eddie Robinson Stadium. A street on GSU's campus is also named for him. In 1985 South 13th Street in Baton Rouge was renamed for him. The Los Angeles Football Classic Foundation's HBCU championship award was called the "Eddie G. Robinson Trophy" in 1988. Beginning in 1994, a different Eddie Robinson Trophy was awarded in Atlanta to the top HBCU player of the year. In 1997 the Football Writers Association of America's Eddie Robinson Award was renamed for him. The Eddie Robinson Classic (held from 1997 to 2002) was named for him. The American Urban Radio Networks has sponsored an award for HBCU coaches called the "SBN Eddie Robinson Coach of the Year;" it was won by Grambling's own Broderick Fobbs in 2014. The Eddie G. Robinson Classic series of high school football games, begun in 2015, was also named after him.

Robinson received the Amos Alonzo Stagg Award from the American Football Coaches Association (AFCA) in 1982 and the Amos Alonzo Stagg Coaching Award from the United States Sports Academy in 1985. Robinson was the 1992 winner of the Bobby Dodd Coach of the Year Award, which was established to honor the NCAA Division I football coach whose team excels on the field, in the classroom, and in the community; the award is named for Bobby Dodd, longtime head football coach of the Georgia Tech Yellow Jackets and was established in 1976 to honor the values that Dodd exemplified. Robinson was awarded the General Robert R. Neyland trophy by the Knoxville Quarterback club in 1999.

Super Bowl XXXII, played at Qualcomm Stadium in San Diego, was dedicated to Robinson. He was accompanied onto the field by Williams and Joe Gibbs to perform the ceremonial coin toss.

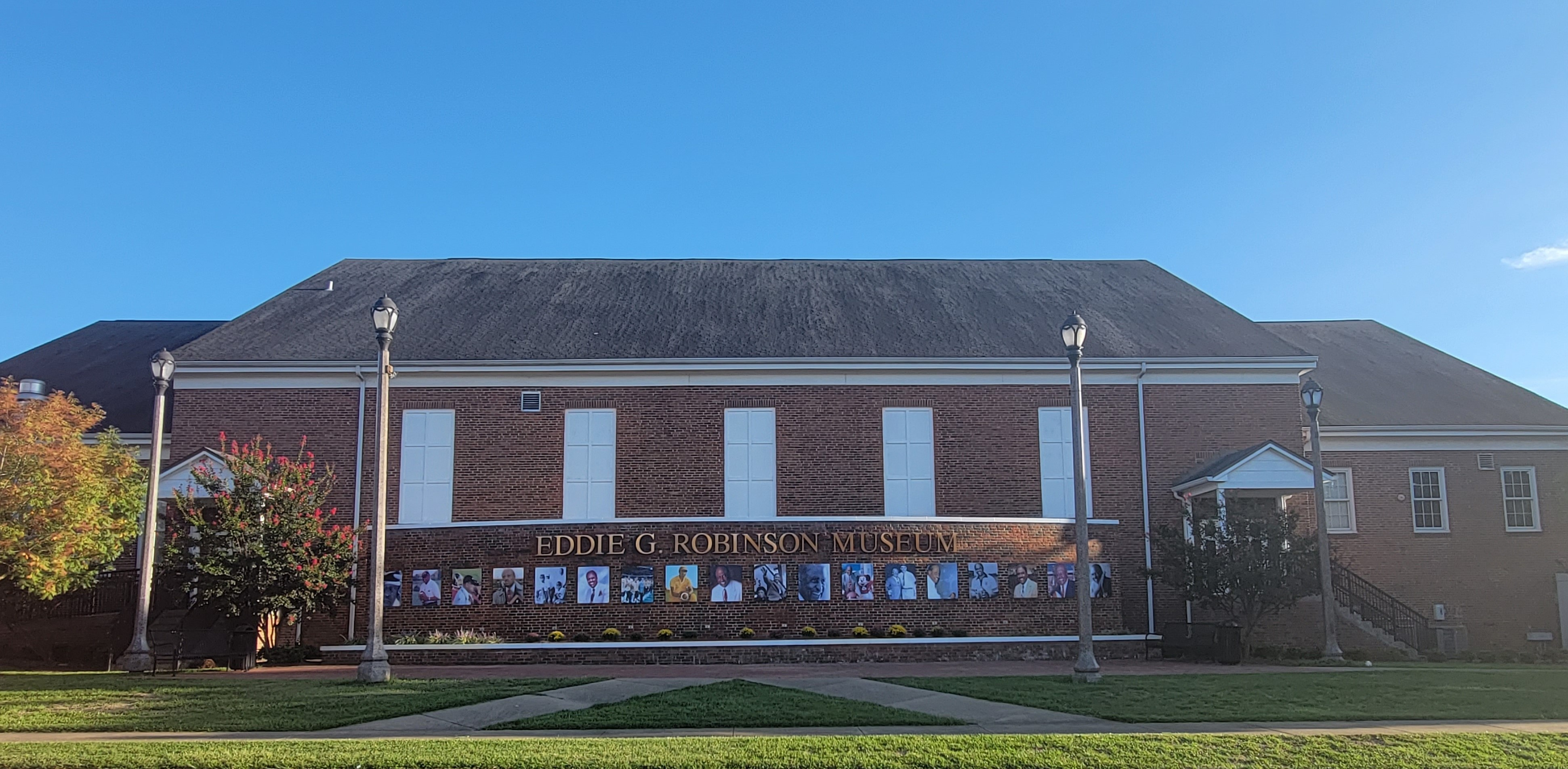
Eddie G. Robinson Museum on the campus of Grambling State University

== Museum ==
In 2010, the Eddie G. Robinson Museum opened on GSU's campus. The museum chronicles and celebrates the major accomplishments of the G-Men football program and former head coach Eddie Robinson. The museum is 18,000 square feet and cost approximately $3.3 million to complete.

== In media ==
In the 1981 TV movie Grambling's White Tiger set in the 1960s, about the true story of Jim Gregory, the first white quarterback at Grambling, Robinson is played by Harry Belafonte.

== Head coaching record ==
=== Football ===
Year	Team	Overall	Conference	Standing	Bowl/playoffs	NCAA^{#}	TSN^{°}
Louisiana Normal / Grambling Tigers (Independent) (1941–1950)
1941	Louisiana Normal	2–6–1					
1942	Louisiana Normal	9–0					
1943	No team—World War II						
1944	No team—World War II						
1945	Louisiana Normal	10–2			W Flower		
1946	Grambling	6–6			W Lions		
1947	Grambling	10–2			L Vulcan		
1948	Grambling	8–2					
1949	Grambling	7–3–2					
1950	Grambling	6–4–1					
Grambling Tigers (Midwest Athletic Association) (1951–1957)
1951	Grambling	4–5–1	0–1–1	5th			
1952	Grambling	7–3–1	1–1–1	4th			
1953	Grambling	8–2	2–1	T–3rd			
1954	Grambling	4–3–2	1–0–1	2nd			
1955	Grambling	10–0	2–0		W Orange Blossom Classic		
1956	Grambling	8–1	1–1	T–2nd			
1957	Grambling	4–4	0–1	5th			
Grambling / Grambling State Tigers (Southwestern Athletic Conference) (1958–1997)
1958	Grambling	6–3	1–3	6th			
1959	Grambling	4–6	2–5	T–5th			
1960	Grambling	9–1	6–1	T–1st			
1961	Grambling	8–2	5–2	T–2nd			
1962	Grambling	6–2–2	3–2–2	T–3rd			
1963	Grambling	5–3–1	3–3–1	T–4th			
1964	Grambling	9–2	6–1	2nd	L Orange Blossom Classic		
1965	Grambling	8–3	6–1	1st	L Pecan		
1966	Grambling	6–2–1	5–1–1	T–1st			
1967	Grambling	9–1	6–1	1st	W Orange Blossom Classic		
1968	Grambling	9–2	6–1	1st	W Pasadena		
1969	Grambling	6–4	5–2	3rd	L Orange Blossom Classic		
1970	Grambling	9–2	5–1	2nd			
1971	Grambling	9–2	5–1	1st			
1972	Grambling	11–2	5–1	T–1st	W Pelican		
1973	Grambling	10–3	5–1	T–1st	W Boardwalk (Division II first round); L Grantland Rice (Division II semifinal)		
1974	Grambling State	11–1	5–1	T–1st	W Pelican		
1975	Grambling State	10–2	4–2	T–1st			
1976	Grambling State	8–4	4–2	T–2nd			
1977	Grambling State	10–1	6–0	1st	W Mirage		
1978	Grambling State	9–1–1	5–0–1	1st	L Orange Blossom Classic		
1979	Grambling State	8–3	5–1	T–1st		1	
1980	Grambling State	10–2	5–1	T–1st	L NCAA Division I-AA Semifinal	2	
1981	Grambling State	6–4–1	4–1–1	2nd			
1982	Grambling State	8–3	5–1	2nd		10	
1983	Grambling State	8–1–2	6–0–1	1st		10	
1984	Grambling State	7–4	5–2	3rd			
1985	Grambling State	9–3	6–1	1st	L NCAA Division I-AA First Round	8	
1986	Grambling State	7–4	4–3	T–3rd			
1987	Grambling State	5–6	3–4	T–5th			
1988	Grambling State	8–3	5–2	2nd		18	
1989	Grambling State	9–3	7–0	1st	L NCAA Division I-AA First Round	19	
1990	Grambling State	8–3	3–3	T–3rd			
1991	Grambling State	5–6	3–4	T–6th			
1992	Grambling State	10–2	6–1	2nd	W Heritage		
1993	Grambling State	7–4	4–3	3rd			
1994	Grambling State	9–3	6–1	T–1st	L Heritage		7
1995	Grambling State	5–6	4–3	4th			
1996	Grambling State	3–8	2–5	T–6th			
1997	Grambling State	3–8	2–6	T–7th			
Louisiana Normal / Grambling / Grambling State:		408–165–15	190–79–10				
Total:		408–165–15					
National championship Conference title Conference division title or championship game berth
^{#}Rankings from final Coaches Poll.; ^{°}Rankings from final AP Poll.

== See also ==
- List of college football career coaching wins leaders
- List of presidents of the American Football Coaches Association
