= 1958 Texas Southern Tigers football team =

American college football season

1958 Texas Southern Tigers football
- Conference: Southwestern Athletic Conference
- Record: 5–5 (2–3 SWAC)
- Head coach: Alexander Durley (10th season)
- Home stadium: Jeppesen Stadium

1958 Southwestern Athletic Conference football standings
	Conf.					Overall
Team	W		L		T	W		L		T
Prairie View A&M $	5	–	0	–	0	10	–	0	–	1
Southern	3	–	2	–	0	8	–	2	–	0
Texas College	3	–	2	–	0	5	–	4	–	0
Texas Southern	2	–	3	–	0	5	–	5	–	0
Wiley	2	–	3	–	0	5	–	5	–	0
Arkansas AM&N	0	–	5	–	0	3	–	6	–	0
$ – Conference champion

The 1958 Texas Southern Tigers football team was an American football team that represented Texas Southern University as a member of the Southwestern Athletic Conference (SWAC) during the 1958 college football season. Led by 10th-year head coach Alexander Durley, the Tigers compiled an overall record of 5–5, with a mark of 2–3 in conference play, and finished tied for fourth in the SWAC.

== Schedule ==
Date	Opponent	Site	Result	Attendance	Source
September 27	Southern	Jeppesen Stadium; Houston, TX	L 6–30		
October 3	at Brooke Army Medical Center*	Leonard Wood Field; San Antonio, TX	L 8–20		
October 13	vs. Prairie View A&M	Cotton Bowl; Dallas, TX (rivalry)	L 19–26	10,000	
October 18	at Texas College	Steer Stadium; Tyler, TX	L 12–13		
October 25	Corpus Christi*	Jeppesen Stadium; Houston, TX	W 20–0		
November 1	Wiley	Jeppesen Stadium; Houston, TX	W 14–0		
November 8	Grambling*	Jeppesen Stadium; Houston, TX	W 21–7		
November 15	vs. Fort Hood*	Public School Stadium; Galveston, TX	W 47–6		
November 22	at Arkansas AM&N	Pumphrey Stadium; Pine Bluff, AR	W 40–0		
November 29	at Florida A&M*	Bragg Memorial Stadium; Tallahassee, FL	L 18–22		
*Non-conference game
