= Howard C. Gentry =

American football player and coach (1921–1995)

Biographical details
- Born: April 15, 1921; Columbus, Ohio, U.S.
- Died: February 14, 1995 (aged 73); Nashville, Tennessee, U.S.

Playing career
- c. 1939–1942: Florida A&M
- Position: Tackle

Coaching career (HC unless noted)
- c. 1947: North Carolina A&T (assistant)
- 1948: Wilberforce State (assistant)
- 1949–1954: Tennessee A&I (assistant)
- 1955–1960: Tennessee A&I

Administrative career (AD unless noted)
- 1961–1976: Tennessee A&I/State

Head coaching record
- Overall: 42–10–1
- Bowls: 1–0

Accomplishments and honors

Championships
- 1 Black college national (1956); 4 MWAA (1956–1957, 1959–1960)

Howard Cornelius Gentry Sr. (April 15, 1921 – February 14, 1995) was an American college football coach. He was the 12th head football coach at Tennessee A&I State College—now known as Tennessee State University—in Nashville, Tennessee, serving for six seasons, from 1955 until 1960, and compiling a record of 42–10–1. Gentry was also the athletic director at Tennessee State from 1961 to 1976.

Gentry played college football as a tackle at Florida A&M University under head coaches William M. Bell and Jake Gaither. In 1943, he graduated with a bachelor's degree in health and physical education. Gentry then served as a second lieutenant in the United States Army during World War II. After the war, he completed a master's degree at the Ohio State University.

His coaching career began at North Carolina A&T University under Bell and was then an assistant coach at Wilberforce State College—now known as Central State University—in Wilberforce, Ohio under head coach Gaston F. Lewis. Gentry moved to Tennessee A&I in 1949 to become an assistant football coach under Henry Kean.

== Head coaching record ==
Year	Team	Overall	Conference	Standing	Bowl/playoffs
Tennessee A&I Tigers (Midwest Athletic Association) (1955–1960)
1955	Tennessee A&I	7–2	3–1	T–2nd	
1956	Tennessee A&I	10–0	4–0	1st	
1957	Tennessee A&I	5–0–1	3–0	T–1st	
1958	Tennessee A&I	4–4	2–1	3rd	
1959	Tennessee A&I	9–1	3–0	1st	
1960	Tennessee A&I	7–3	3–0	1st	
Tennessee A&I:		42–10–1	18–2		
Total:		42–10–1			
National championship Conference title Conference division title or championship game berth

Gentry died in 1995 at the age of 73 and was buried at Nashville National Cemetery.
