= BREC Memorial Stadium =

Stadium in Baton Rouge, Louisiana

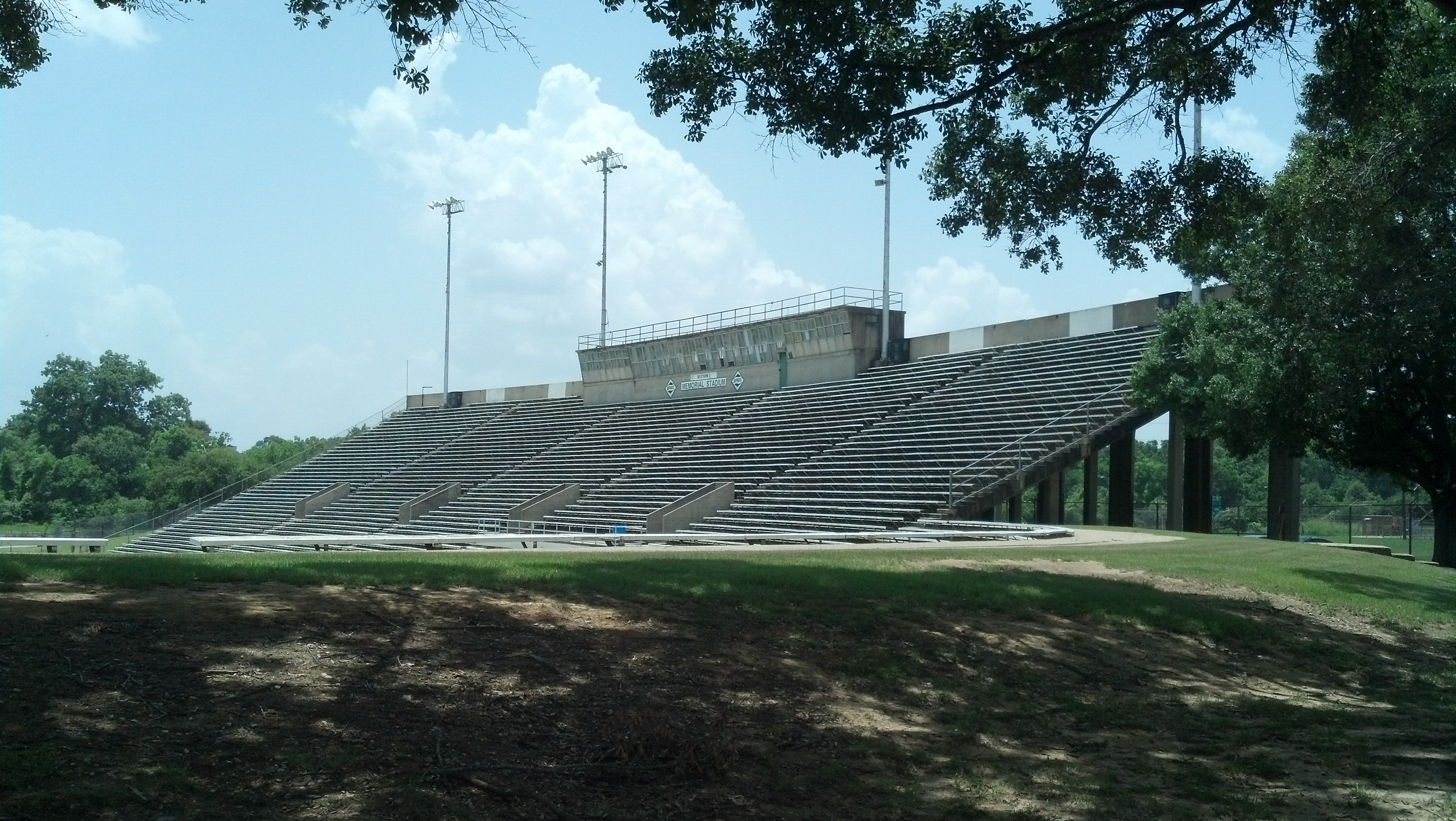
- Interactive map of BREC Memorial Stadium
- Location: Baton Rouge, Louisiana
- Coordinates: 30.4588°N 91.1721°W
- Owner: BREC
- Operator: BREC
- Capacity: 21,500
- Surface: Grass
- Acreage: 20 acres (8.1 ha)

Construction
- Opened: 1952

Tenants
- LHSAA (football) (1956–present); Grantland Rice Bowl (1969–1973)

BREC Memorial Stadium is a 21,500-seat American football stadium in Baton Rouge, Louisiana that opened in 1952. Besides high school football, it is also used for concerts and other outdoor events, including monster truck rallies, and used for water skiing events (during the 1960s and 1970s). It features a modern press box, concession stands and restrooms. The Grantland Rice Bowl was played at the stadium from 1969 to 1973.

The stadium was dedicated by BREC, the parks and recreation commission for East Baton Rouge Parish, in memory of the men and women who fought and served Baton Rouge during the two World Wars and the Korean War.

== See also ==
- List of music venues
- Louisiana High School Athletic Association
