= List of Florida A&M Rattlers head football coaches =

List of head football coaches for the Florida A&M Rattlers

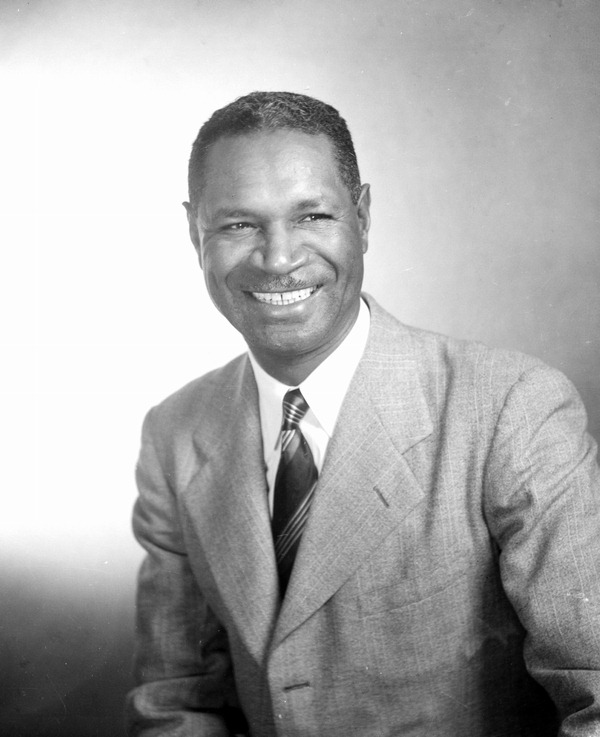
Jake Gaither served as head coach from 1945 to 1969 and won 20 conference and 8 national championship during his tenure with the Rattlers.

The Florida A&M Rattlers college football team represents Florida A&M University in the East Division of the Southwestern Athletic Conference (SWAC), as part of the NCAA Division I Football Championship Subdivision. The program has had 21 head coaches, and 1 interim head coach, since it began play during the 1907 season. Since December 2025, Quinn Gray has served as Florida A&M's head coach.

Six coaches have led Florida A&M in postseason bowl games: William M. Bell, Jake Gaither, Rudy Hubbard, Ken Riley, Billy Joe, and Willie Simmons. Seven coaches also won conference championships: Gaither captured twenty, Bell three, and Hubbard two, as a member of the Southern Intercollegiate Athletic Conference; Joe captured five, Riley two, and Taylor one as a member of Mid-Eastern Athletic Conference; Simmons captured one as a member of the SWAC. Gaither captured eight and Bell and Hubbard both captured two black college football national championships. Gaither also won the 1962 AP small college national championship and Hubbard won the 1978 NCAA Division I-AA football national championship.

Gaither is the leader in seasons coached, with 25 years as head coach and games coached (243), won (203), and highest winning percentage at .844. Of the 19 different head coaches who have led the Rattlers, Gaither, Hubbard, Joe, and Joe Taylor have been inducted into the College Football Hall of Fame.

== Key ==
Key to symbols in coaches list
| General | | Overall | | Conference | | Postseason (Note: Although the first Rose Bowl Game was played in 1902, it has been continuously played since the 1916 game, and is recognized as the oldest bowl game by the NCAA. "—" indicates any season prior to 1916 when postseason games were not played.) | |
|---|---|---|---|---|---|---|---|
| No. | Order of coaches (Note: A running total of the number of head coaches, with coaches who served separate tenures being counted only once. Interim head coaches are represented with "Int" and are not counted in the running total. "—" indicates the team played but either without a coach or no coach is on record. "X" indicates an interim year without play.) | GC | Games coached | CW | Conference wins | PW | Postseason wins |
| DC | Division championships | OW | Overall wins | CL | Conference losses | PL | Postseason losses |
| CC | Conference championships | OL | Overall losses | CT | Conference ties | PT | Postseason ties |
| NC | National championships | OT | Overall ties (Note: Overtime rules in college football were introduced in 1996, making ties impossible in the period since.) | C% | Conference winning percentage | | |
| † | Elected to the College Football Hall of Fame | O% | Overall winning percentage (Note: When computing the win–loss percentage, a tie counts as half a win and half a loss.) | | | | |

== Coaches ==
List of head football coaches showing season(s) coached, overall records, conference records, postseason records, championships and selected awards (Note: Statistics correct as of the end of the 2025 NCAA Division I FCS football season.)
| No. | Name | Season(s) | GC | OW | OL | OT | O% | CW | CL | CT | C% | PW | PL | PT | DC | CC | NC | Awards |
|---|---|---|---|---|---|---|---|---|---|---|---|---|---|---|---|---|---|---|
| 1 | Jubie Bragg | 1907–1909; 1920–1925; 1930 | 20 | 4 | 14 | 2 | 0.250 | 1 | 10 | 2 | 0.154 | — | — | — | — | 0 | 0 | — |
| 2 | Jazz Byrd | 1926–1928 | 17 | 7 | 9 | 1 | 0.441 | 1 | 8 | 0 | 0.111 | — | — | — | — | 0 | 0 | — |
| 3 | W. McKinley King | 1929 | 6 | 0 | 4 | 2 | 0.167 | 0 | 3 | 0 | .000 | — | — | — | — | 0 | 0 | — |
| 4 | Ted A. Wright | 1931–1933 | 23 | 12 | 10 | 1 | 0.543 | 3 | 8 | 0 | 0.273 | — | — | — | — | 0 | 0 | — |
| 5 | Eugene J. Bragg | 1934–1935 | 18 | 9 | 8 | 1 | 0.528 | 5 | 7 | 0 | 0.417 | — | — | — | — | 0 | 0 | — |
| 6 | William M. Bell | 1936–1942 | 60 | 45 | 9 | 6 | 0.800 | 33 | 6 | 2 | 0.829 | 5 | 2 | 1 | — | 3 | 2 – 1938; 1942 | — |
| 7 | Herman Neilson | 1943–1944 | 17 | 8 | 7 | 2 | 0.529 | 6 | 1 | 2 | 0.778 | 0 | 0 | 0 | — | 0 | 0 | — |
| 8 | Jake Gaither^{†} | 1945–1969 | 243 | 203 | 36 | 4 | 0.844 | 122 | 3 | 0 | 0.976 | 12 | 13 | 1 | 3 | 20 | 8 – 1950; 1952; 1953; 1954; 1957; 1959; 1961; 1962 | NAIA Coach of the Year (1969) |
| 9 | Pete Griffin | 1970 | 10 | 5 | 5 | 0 | 0.500 | 3 | 1 | 0 | 0.750 | 0 | 0 | 0 | 0 | 0 | 0 | — |
| 10 | Clarence Montgomery | 1971 | 11 | 6 | 5 | 0 | 0.545 | 3 | 1 | 0 | 0.750 | 0 | 0 | 0 | 0 | 0 | 0 | — |
| 11 | Big Jim Williams | 1972–1973 | 22 | 10 | 12 | 0 | 0.455 | 6 | 4 | 0 | 0.600 | 0 | 0 | 0 | 0 | 0 | 0 | — |
| 12 | Rudy Hubbard^{†} | 1974–1985 | 134 | 83 | 48 | 3 | 0.631 | 30 | 9 | 1 | 0.763 | 7 | 0 | 0 | — | 2 | 2 – 1977; 1978 | — |
| 13 | Ken Riley | 1986–1993 | 88 | 46 | 40 | 2 | 0.534 | 23 | 13 | 0 | 0.639 | 0 | 1 | 0 | — | 2 | 0 | — |
| 14 | Billy Joe^{†} | 1994–2004 | 132 | 86 | 46 | 0 | 0.652 | 56 | 17 | 0 | 0.767 | 3 | 7 | 0 | — | 5 | 2– 1998; 2001 | — |
| 15 | Rubin Carter | 2005–2007 | 33 | 16 | 17 | — | 0.485 | 12 | 14 | — | 0.462 | 0 | 0 | — | — | 0 | 0 | — |
| 16 | Joe Taylor^{†} | 2008–2012 | 54 | 35 | 19 | — | 0.648 | 26 | 12 | — | 0.684 | 0 | 0 | — | — | 1 | 0 | — |
| 17 | Earl Holmes | 2012–2014 | 22 | 6 | 16 | — | 0.273 | 5 | 9 | — | 0.357 | 0 | 0 | — | — | 0 | 0 | — |
| Int | Corey Fuller (Note: Corey Fuller was named interim head coach after Earl Holmes was fired as head coach after a 2–6 start to the season.) | 2014 | 4 | 1 | 3 | — | 0.250 | 1 | 3 | — | 0.250 | 0 | 0 | — | — | 0 | 0 | — |
| 18 | Alex Wood | 2015–2017 | 33 | 8 | 25 | — | 0.242 | 7 | 17 | — | 0.292 | 0 | 0 | — | — | 0 | 0 | — |
| 19 | Willie Simmons | 2018–2023 | 58 | 45 | 13 | — | 0.776 | 32 | 5 | — | 0.865 | 1 | 1 | — | 1 | 1 | 1 – 2023 | — |
| 20 | James Colzie III | 2024–2025 | 24 | 12 | 12 | — | 0.500 | 9 | 7 | — | 0.563 | 0 | 0 | — | 0 | 0 | 0 | — |
| 21 | Quinn Gray | 2026–present | 0 | 0 | 0 | — | – | 0 | 0 | — | – | 0 | 0 | — | 0 | 0 | 0 | — |
