= 1975 Florida A&M Rattlers football team =

American college football season

1975 Florida A&M Rattlers football

Orange Blossom Classic, W 40–13 vs. Kentucky State
- Conference: Southern Intercollegiate Athletic Conference
- Division I
- Record: 9–2 (4–1 SIAC)
- Head coach: Rudy Hubbard (2nd season)
- Home stadium: Bragg Memorial Stadium; Doak Campbell Stadium

1975 Southern Intercollegiate Athletic Conference football standings
| | Conf. | | | | | Overall |
| Team | W | | L | | T | W | | L | | T |
|---|---|---|---|---|---|---|---|---|---|---|
Division I
| Bethune–Cookman x | 4 | – | 1 | – | 0 | 10 | – | 1 | – | 0 |
| Florida A&M | 4 | – | 1 | – | 0 | 9 | – | 2 | – | 0 |
| Tuskegee | 3 | – | 2 | – | 0 | 5 | – | 5 | – | 0 |
| Albany State | 3 | – | 2 | – | 0 | 3 | – | 6 | – | 0 |
| Alabama A&M | 2 | – | 3 | – | 0 | 3 | – | 8 | – | 0 |
| Alabama State | 1 | – | 4 | – | 0 | 5 | – | 6 | – | 0 |
| Morris Brown | 0 | – | 5 | – | 0 | 3 | – | 6 | – | 0 |
Division II
| Fisk x | 5 | – | 0 | – | 0 | 7 | – | 2 | – | 0 |
| Fort Valley State | 4 | – | 0 | – | 1 | 6 | – | 0 | – | 2 |
| Savannah State | 2 | – | 2 | – | 0 | 3 | – | 7 | – | 0 |
| Lane | 2 | – | 2 | – | 0 | 2 | – | 6 | – | 0 |
| Knoxville | 2 | – | 3 | – | 0 | 5 | – | 4 | – | 1 |
| Miles | 2 | – | 3 | – | 0 | 4 | – | 6 | – | 0 |
| Clark (GA) | 1 | – | 3 | – | 1 | 4 | – | 4 | – | 1 |
| Morehouse | 0 | – | 5 | – | 0 | 0 | – | 9 | – | 0 |
x – Division champion/co-champions

The 1975 Florida A&M Rattlers football team represented Florida A&M University as a member of Division I of the Southern Intercollegiate Athletic Conference (SIAC) during the 1975 NCAA Division II football season. Led by second-year head coach Rudy Hubbard, the Rattlers finished the season overall record of 9–2 and a mark of 4–1 in conference play, and finished second in the SIAC's Division I.

== Schedule ==
| Date | Opponent | Site | Result | Attendance | Source |
|---|---|---|---|---|---|
| September 20 | Albany State | Bragg Memorial Stadium; Tallahassee, FL | W 54–7 | 11,500 | |
| September 27 | at North Carolina A&T* | World War Memorial Stadium; Greensboro, NC | W 7–0 | 8,700–10,000 | |
| October 4 | vs. Howard* | Veterans Stadium; Philadelphia, PA (OIC Classic) | L 0–6 | 18,700–34,000 | |
| October 11 | Alabama State | Bragg Memorial Stadium; Tallahassee, FL | W 12–11 | 11,731 | |
| October 18 | Morris Brown^{†} | Bragg Memorial Stadium; Tallahassee, FL | W 52–0 | 18,331 | |
| October 25 | at Tennessee State* | Dudley Field; Nashville, TN | W 17–0 | 21,000 | |
| November 1 | at Tuskegee | Abbott Memorial Alumni Stadium; Tuskegee, AL | L 10–16 | 6,500 | |
| November 8 | at Alabama A&M | Milton Frank Stadium; Huntsville, AL | W 17–9 | 5,500 | |
| November 15 | vs. Southern* | Tampa Stadium; Tampa, FL | W 10–0 | 18,000 | |
| November 22 | Bethune–Cookman | Doak Campbell Stadium; Tallahassee, FL (Florida Classic) | W 17–7 | 27,500 | |
| December 6 | vs. Kentucky State* | Miami Orange Bowl; Miami, FL (Orange Blossom Classic) | W 40–13 | 27,875 | |
*Non-conference game; ^{†}Homecoming; Source:
