= 1977 Florida A&M Rattlers football team =

American college football season

1977 Florida A&M Rattlers football

Black college national champion SIAC Division I champion

Orange Blossom Classic, W 37–15 vs. Delaware State
- Conference: Southern Intercollegiate Athletic Conference
- Division I
- Record: 11–0 (5–0 SIAC)
- Head coach: Rudy Hubbard (4th season)
- Defensive coordinator: Fred Goldsmith (4th season)
- Home stadium: Bragg Memorial Stadium, Doak Campbell Stadium

1977 Southern Intercollegiate Athletic Conference football standings
	Conf.					Overall
Team	W		L		T	W		L		T
Division I
Florida A&M x	5	–	0	–	0	11	–	0	–	0
Bethune–Cookman ^	4	–	1	–	0	8	–	4	–	0
Albany State	2	–	3	–	0	7	–	3	–	0
Morris Brown	2	–	3	–	0	5	–	4	–	0
Alabama A&M	1	–	4	–	0	2	–	9	–	0
Tuskegee	1	–	4	–	0	3	–	7	–	0
Division II
Knoxville x	6	–	1	–	0	8	–	3	–	0
Savannah State	3	–	2	–	0	4	–	5	–	0
Clark (GA)	3	–	2	–	0	3	–	5	–	0
Morehouse	3	–	3	–	0	4	–	5	–	0
Lane	2	–	2	–	0	2	–	6	–	0
Fort Valley State	2	–	3	–	0	5	–	5	–	0
Miles	2	–	3	–	0	2	–	8	–	0
Fisk	0	–	5	–	0	0	–	9	–	0
x – Division champion/co-champions; ^ – NCAA Division II playoff participant

The 1977 Florida A&M Rattlers football team represented Florida A&M University as a member of the Southern Intercollegiate Athletic Conference (SIAC) during the 1977 NCAA Division II football season. Led by fourth-year head coach Rudy Hubbard, the Rattlers compiled an overall record of 11–0 and a mark of 5–0 in conference play, and finished as SIAC champion. At the conclusion of the season, the Rattlers were also recognized as black college national champion.

== Schedule ==
Date	Opponent	Site	Result	Attendance	Source
September 10	vs. Howard*	Giants Stadium; East Rutherford, NJ (Football Scholarship Classic)	W 28–6	34,601–35,094	
September 17	Albany State	Bragg Memorial Stadium; Tallahassee, FL	W 22–7	10,500	
September 24	vs. Alcorn State*	Milwaukee County Stadium; Milwaukee, WI (Midwest Gridiron Classic)	W 28–7	16,500–19,762	
October 8	Alabama State*	Bragg Memorial Stadium; Tallahassee, FL	W 21–16	11,986	
October 15	Morris Brown^{†}	Bragg Memorial Stadium; Tallahassee, FL	W 47–19	17,600	
October 22	at Tennessee State*	Dudley Field; Nashville, TN	W 31–28	32,900–33,402	
October 29	at Tuskegee	Alumni Bowl; Tuskegee, AL	W 36–20	8,162	
November 5	at Alabama A&M	Milton Frank Stadium; Huntsville, AL	W 12–7	8,301	
November 12	vs. Southern*	Tampa Stadium; Tampa, FL	W 19–6	17,646–19,386	
November 19	Bethune–Cookman	Doak Campbell Stadium; Tallahassee, FL (Florida Classic)	W 14–7	37,501	
December 10	vs. Delaware State*	Miami Orange Bowl; Miami, FL (Orange Blossom Classic)	W 37–15	29,493	
*Non-conference game; ^{†}Homecoming
