= 1949 Florida A&M Rattlers football team =

American college football season

1949 Florida A&M Rattlers football

SIAC champion

Orange Blossom Classic, L 14–20 vs. North Carolina A&T
- Conference: Southern Intercollegiate Athletic Conference
- Record: 7–2 (6–0 SIAC)
- Head coach: Jake Gaither (5th season)
- Home stadium: Bragg Stadium

1949 Southern Intercollegiate Athletic Conference football standings
	Conf.					Overall
Team	W		L		T	W		L		T
Florida A&M $	6	–	0	–	0	7	–	2	–	0
Benedict	5	–	1	–	0	6	–	1	–	0
Fisk	4	–	1	–	0	6	–	3	–	0
Morris Brown	4	–	2	–	1	6	–	3	–	1
Alabama A&M	3	–	2	–	2	6	–	2	–	2
Clark (GA)	4	–	3	–	0	4	–	4	–	0
Tuskegee	4	–	3	–	0	4	–	6	–	0
Fort Valley State	2	–	2	–	1	5	–	3	–	1
South Carolina State	2	–	2	–	1	3	–	4	–	1
LeMoyne	2	–	3	–	0	4	–	4	–	0
Morehouse	2	–	4	–	1	3	–	4	–	1
Alabama State	2	–	5	–	2	2	–	6	–	2
Xavier (LA)	1	–	5	–	0	4	–	6	–	0
Allen	0	–	3	–	0	5	–	6	–	0
Lane	0	–	4	–	0	0	–	7	–	0
$ – Conference champion

The 1949 Florida A&M Rattlers football team was an American football team that represented Florida A&M University as a member of the Southern Intercollegiate Athletic Conference (SIAC) during the 1949 college football season. In their fifth season under head coach Jake Gaither, the Rattlers compiled a 7–2 record, won the SIAC championship, and outscored opponents by a total of 315 to 98.

The team ranked No. 5 among the nation's black college football teams according to the Pittsburgh Courier and its Dickinson Rating System. The team's victories included three games against teams that were ranked in the final Pittsburgh Courier rankings: a victory over No. 10 Benedict and losses to No. 2 Southern and No. 8 North Carolina A&T in the Orange Blossom Classic.

The team played its home games at Bragg Stadium in Tallahassee, Florida.

== Schedule ==
Date	Opponent	Site	Result	Attendance	Source
October 1	Benedict	Bragg Stadium; Tallahassee, FL	W 13–0	1,500	
October 8	at Fort Valley State	Fort Valley, GA	W 39–7		
October 15	Morris Brown	Bragg Stadium; Tallahassee, FL	W 31–20	5,000	
October 22	Xavier (LA)	Centennial Field; Tallahassee, FL	W 58–13	4,500	
November 5	at Tuskegee	Alumni Bowl; Tuskegee, AL	W 58–0		
November 12	at Allen	Hurst Field; Columbia, SC	W 34–0		
November 19	Southern*	Bragg Stadium; Tallahassee, FL	L 13–31	8,000	
December 3	Alcorn A&M*	Bragg Stadium; Tallahassee, FL	W 55–7	2,000	
December 10	vs. North Carolina A&T*	Burdine Stadium; Miami, FL (Orange Blossom Classic)	L 14–20	14,274	
*Non-conference game
