= 1955 Florida A&M Rattlers football team =

American college football season

1955 Florida A&M Rattlers football

SIAC champion

Orange Blossom Classic, L 21–28 vs. Grambling
- Conference: Southern Intercollegiate Athletic Conference
- Record: 7–1–1 (6–0 SIAC)
- Head coach: Jake Gaither (11th season)
- Home stadium: Bragg Stadium

1955 Southern Intercollegiate Athletic Conference football standings
	Conf.					Overall
Team	W		L		T	W		L		T
No. 3 Florida A&M $	6	–	0	–	0	7	–	1	–	1
Bethune–Cookman	4	–	2	–	0	5	–	4	–	1
Xavier (LA)	4	–	2	–	0	5	–	3	–	0
No. 15 Morris Brown	5	–	1	–	0	6	–	3	–	0
Alabama State	6	–	2	–	0	7	–	2	–	0
Allen	4	–	2	–	0	6	–	2	–	0
Alabama A&M	4	–	2	–	1	5	–	2	–	1
South Carolina State	3	–	3	–	0	3	–	6	–	0
Knoxville	3	–	3	–	0	4	–	5	–	0
Clark (GA)	2	–	5	–	1	2	–	5	–	1
Tuskegee	1	–	5	–	2	2	–	6	–	2
Fort Valley State	2	–	6	–	0	3	–	6	–	0
Morehouse	1	–	4	–	1	3	–	4	–	1
Benedict	1	–	5	–	1	2	–	6	–	1
Fisk	1	–	5	–	0	2	–	8	–	0
Lane	1	–	1	–	0	3	–	4	–	0
$ – Conference champion; Standings were based on Dickinson System ratings.; Rankings from The Pittsburgh Courier.

The 1955 Florida A&M Rattlers football team was an American football team that represented Florida A&M University as a member of the Southern Intercollegiate Athletic Conference (SIAC) during the 1955 college football season. In their 11th season under head coach Jake Gaither, the Rattlers compiled a 7–1–1 record, won the SIAC championship, and outscored opponents by a total of 369 to 94. The team played its home games at Bragg Stadium in Tallahassee, Florida.

The Rattlers' sole loss was to undefeated Grambling in the Orange Blossom Classic. Florida A&M had been favored prior to the game, but Grambling upset the Rattlers to win the black college football national championship. Florida A&M was ranked No. 3 in the final rankings of black college football teams issued by the Pittsburgh Courier.

The team's statistical leaders included Willie Galimore with 780 rushing yards, Lawrence Williams with 299 passing yards, and Al Frazier with 258 receiving yards and 78 points scored. Galimore later played seven years with the Chicago Bears and was inducted into the College Football Hall of Fame.

== Schedule ==
Date	Opponent	Site	Result	Attendance	Source
October 1	Benedict	Bragg Stadium; Tallahassee, FL	W 80–6		
October 8	at Fort Valley State	Fort Valley, GA	W 49–0		
October 15	Morris Brown^{†}	Bragg Stadium; Tallahassee, FL	W 14–6	7,000	
October 22	vs. Bethune–Cookman	Gator Bowl; Jacksonville, FL (Florida Classic)	W 32–0	18,214	
October 29	at Xavier (LA)	Xavier Stadium; New Orleans, LA	W 60–19		
November 5	at North Carolina A&T*	World War Memorial Stadium; Greensboro, NC	T 28–28		
November 12	at Allen	Hurst Alumni Stadium; Columbia, SC	W 34–7	2,000	
November 19	Southern*	Bragg Stadium; Tallahassee, FL	W 51–0	9,000	
December 3	vs. Grambling*	Burdine Stadium; Miami, FL (Orange Blossom Classic)	L 21–28	40,319	
*Non-conference game; ^{†}Homecoming; Source:
