= 1945 Florida A&M Rattlers football team =

American college football season

1945 Florida A&M Rattlers football

SIAC champion

Orange Blossom Classic, L 6–32 vs. Wiley
- Conference: Southern Intercollegiate Athletic Conference
- Record: 9–1 (6–0 SIAC)
- Head coach: Jake Gaither (1st season)
- Home stadium: Sampson-Bragg Field

1945 Southern Intercollegiate Athletic Conference football standings
	Conf.					Overall
Team	W		L		T	W		L		T
Florida A&M $	6	–	0	–	0	9	–	1	–	0
Clark (GA)	4	–	1	–	1	4	–	3	–	1
Morris Brown	3	–	2	–	0	5	–	2	–	1
Tuskegee	2	–	2	–	1	6	–	6	–	1
Knoxville	2	–	3	–	0	5	–	5	–	0
Alabama State	2	–	5	–	0	2	–	6	–	0
Alabama A&M	1	–	3	–	0	2	–	6	–	0
Morehouse	1	–	5	–	0	1	–	6	–	0
Benedict	0	–	1	–	0	0	–	3	–	0
Lane	1	–	0	–	0	3	–	2	–	0
$ – Conference champion

The 1945 Florida A&M Rattlers football team was an American football team that represented Florida A&M College as a member of the Southern Intercollegiate Athletic Conference (SIAC) during the 1945 college football season. In their first season under head coach Jake Gaither, the Rattlers compiled an overall record of 9–1 with a mark of 6–0 in conference play, winning the SIAC championship. The team's sole loss was to undefeated black college national champion Wiley in the Orange Blossom Classic. The Rattlers played their home games at Sampson-Bragg Field in Tallahassee, Florida.

After seven years as an assistant coach, Jake Gaither took over as head football coach prior to the 1945 season. It was during the 1945 season that Gaither first adopted the "blood, sweat and tears" motto for his team, taking the phrase from the famous words of Winston Churchill. Gaither's assistants in 1945 were Pete Griffin, M.L. Neeley, and Jess Ramsey.

Four Florida A&M players were named to the All-SIAC football team selected by the conference coaches: quarterback Leroy Cromartie; halfback Ted Montgomery; end Nathaniel Powell; and tackle Bill Brewington. Two others received honorable mention honors: center Forrest McKinney and fullback Lernard Ingraham.

At the team banquet following the season, college president, Dr. William H. Gray Jr., praised the work of his young coach: "Although I value a winning football team, I value Coach Gaither, not because he has coached a championship team, but because he has proved himself to be a great teacher of men, both by precept and by example. The lessons that our boys have learned under the direction of Coach Gaither, if applied throughout life, will bring victory to them, not only on the field of athletic endeavor but also in the greater field that lies ahead."

== Schedule ==
Date	Time	Opponent	Site	Result	Attendance	Source
October 6		at Wilberforce*	Wilberforce, OH	W 26–20		
October 13		at Alabama State	Hornet Stadium; Montgomery, AL	W 17–2		
October 20		Morris Brown	Sampson-Bragg Field; Tallahassee, FL	W 39–0	4,000	
October 27		Knoxville	Sampson-Bragg Field; Tallahassee, FL	W 25–0		
November 3		vs. Tennessee A&I*	Jacksonville Stadium; Jacksonville, FL	W 20–18		
November 10		at Tuskegee	Alumni Bowl; Tuskegee, AL	W 54–20		
November 17		at Clark (GA)	Ponce de Leon Park; Atlanta, GA	W 24–19		
November 24		at Morehouse^{†}	Harper Field; Atlanta, GA	W 46–6		
December 1	2:30 p.m.	Louisiana Normal (Grambling)*	Sampson-Bragg Field; Tallahassee, FL	W 33–12		
December 8		vs. Wiley*	Phillips Field; Tampa, FL (Orange Blossom Classic)	L 6–32	8,000	
*Non-conference game; ^{†}Homecoming; All times are in Eastern time
