= 1936 Florida A&M Rattlers football team =

American college football season

1936 Florida A&M Rattlers football

Orange Blossom Classic, L 0–6 vs. Prairie View
- Conference: Southern Intercollegiate Athletic Conference
- Record: 2–4–1 (2–2–1 SIAC)
- Head coach: William M. Bell (1st season)
- Home stadium: College Field

1936 Southern Intercollegiate Athletic Conference football standings
	Conf.					Overall
Team	W		L		T	W		L		T
Tuskegee $	4	–	2	–	0	7	–	5	–	0
Alabama State	3	–	2	–	2	5	–	2	–	3
Morehouse	4	–	1	–	2	4	–	2	–	2
Florida A&M	2	–	2	–	1	2	–	4	–	1
Morris Brown	2	–	1	–	2	5	–	1	–	2
LeMoyne	4	–	2	–	0	5	–	2	–	0
Lane	2	–	1	–	1	6	–	1	–	2
Xavier (LA)	2	–	1	–	0	6	–	5	–	0
Knoxville	2	–	2	–	0	4	–	3	–	0
Talladega	1	–	2	–	0	2	–	2	–	1
Clark (GA)	2	–	5	–	0	2	–	6	–	0
South Carolina State	0	–	2	–	1	3	–	3	–	2
Fisk	0	–	5	–	1	0	–	6	–	1
$ – Conference champion; Standings were based on Dickinson System ratings. Tuskegee and Alabama both had a rating of 24.00. Tuskegee was awarded the conference championship based on a head-to-head win over Alabama State.

The 1936 Florida A&M Rattlers football team represented Florida A&M University as a member of the Southern Intercollegiate Athletic Conference (SIAC) during the 1936 college football season. Led by first-year head coach William M. Bell, the Rattlers finished fourth in the SIAC with an overall record of 2–4–1 and a mark of 2–2–1 in conference play. Florida A&M were defeated by Prairie View in the Orange Blossom Classic.

== Schedule ==
Date	Opponent	Site	Result	Attendance	Source
October 10	at LeMoyne	Washington High Stadium; Memphis, TN	L 0–26		
October 17	Clark (GA)	College Field; Tallahassee, FL	L 3–6		
October 24	Alabama State	College Field; Tallahassee, FL	T 0–0		
November 6	at Tuskegee	Alumni Bowl; Tuskegee, AL	W 14–13		
November 14	South Carolina State^{†}	College Field; Tallahassee, FL	W 9–0	2,000	
November 26	at Alcorn A&M*	Henderson Stadium; Lorman, MS	L 7–12		
December 5	vs. Prairie View*	Durkee Field; Jacksonville, FL (Orange Blossom Classic)	L 0–6	5,000	
*Non-conference game; ^{†}Homecoming
