= 1948 Florida A&M Rattlers football team =

American college football season

1948 Florida A&M Rattlers football

SIAC champion

Orange Blossom Classic, L 18–38 vs. Virginia Union
- Conference: Southern Intercollegiate Athletic Conference
- Record: 8–2 (6–0 SIAC)
- Head coach: Jake Gaither (4th season)
- Home stadium: Bragg Stadium

1948 Southern Intercollegiate Athletic Conference football standings
	Conf.					Overall
Team	W		L		T	W		L		T
Florida A&M $	6	–	0	–	0	8	–	2	–	0
Lane	4	–	0	–	1	7	–	1	–	1
Allen	3	–	0	–	0	7	–	1	–	0
Fort Valley State	5	–	1	–	0	7	–	1	–	0
South Carolina State	3	–	1	–	1	4	–	3	–	1
Alabama A&M	3	–	2	–	1	4	–	2	–	1
Tuskegee	3	–	2	–	1	4	–	4	–	1
Clark (GA)	3	–	3	–	1	4	–	3	–	1
Morehouse	3	–	3	–	0	4	–	4	–	0
Fisk	2	–	2	–	0	3	–	4	–	0
Morris Brown	3	–	4	–	0	3	–	6	–	0
Benedict	1	–	4	–	1	1	–	4	–	2
Alabama State	1	–	7	–	1	1	–	8	–	1
Knoxville	0	–	3	–	0	?	–	?	–	?
Xavier (LA)	0	–	4	–	1	1	–	6	–	1
LeMoyne	0	–	4	–	0	0	–	7	–	1
$ – Conference champion

The 1948 Florida A&M Rattlers football team represented Florida A&M University as a member of the Southern Intercollegiate Athletic Conference (SIAC) during the 1948 college football season. Led by fourth-year head coach Jake Gaither, the Rattlers finished the season as SIAC champion with an overall record of 8–2 and a mark of 6–0 in conference play. Florida A&M was defeated by Virginia Union in the Orange Blossom Classic.

== Schedule ==
Date	Opponent	Site	Result	Attendance	Source
September 25	at Benedict	Antisdel Bowl; Columbia, SC	W 20–6		
October 2	Shaw*	Bragg Stadium; Tallahassee, FL	W 7–6	5,000	
October 9	Alabama State	Bragg Stadium; Tallahassee, FL	W 41–0	2,500	
October 15	at Morris Brown	Herndon Stadium; Atlanta, GA	W 13–6		
October 23	at Xavier (LA)	Xavier Stadium; New Orleans, LA	W 26–6		
October 30	Kentucky State*^{†}	Bragg Stadium; Tallahassee, FL	W 23–14	3,000	
November 6	vs. Tuskegee	Orlando Stadium; Orlando, FL	W 39–0	6,000	
November 13	Clark (GA)	Bragg Stadium; Tallahassee, FL	W 36–12		
November 20	at Southern*	University Stadium; Baton Rouge, LA	L 12–37	7,000	
December 4	vs. Virginia Union*	Burdine Stadium; Miami, FL (Orange Blossom Classic)	L 18–38	15,986	
*Non-conference game; ^{†}Homecoming; Source:
