= 1950 Florida A&M Rattlers football team =

American college football season

1950 Florida A&M Rattlers football

Black college national co-champion SIAC co-champion

Orange Blossom Classic, L 6–13 vs. Wilberforce State
- Conference: Southern Intercollegiate Athletic Conference
- Record: 8–1–1 (5–0 SIAC)
- Head coach: Jake Gaither (6th season)
- Home stadium: Bragg Stadium

1950 Southern Intercollegiate Athletic Conference football standings
	Conf.					Overall
Team	W		L		T	W		L		T
Xavier (LA) +	6	–	0	–	0	7	–	1	–	0
Florida A&M +	5	–	0	–	0	8	–	1	–	1
Fisk	5	–	2	–	0	5	–	2	–	0
Morris Brown	5	–	2	–	0	7	–	3	–	0
Benedict	4	–	2	–	0	6	–	2	–	1
Fort Valley State	5	–	3	–	0	7	–	3	–	0
LeMoyne	3	–	2	–	1	3	–	3	–	1
Allen	2	–	2	–	1	5	–	4	–	1
Clark (GA)	3	–	4	–	1	3	–	4	–	1
Lane	2	–	3	–	1	2	–	6	–	2
Alabama State	3	–	5	–	1	3	–	6	–	1
Alabama A&M	2	–	5	–	0	3	–	7	–	0
Tuskegee	2	–	5	–	2	2	–	5	–	2
South Carolina State	1	–	6	–	0	1	–	7	–	0
Morehouse	0	–	6	–	1	1	–	6	–	1
Knoxville	0	–	1	–	0	0	–	7	–	0
+ – Conference co-champions

The 1950 Florida A&M Rattlers football team was an American football team that represented Florida A&M University as a member of the Southern Intercollegiate Athletic Conference (SIAC) during the 1950 college football season. In their sixth season under head coach Jake Gaither, the Rattlers compiled an 8–1–1 record. The team's sole loss was to Wilberforce State in the Orange Blossom Classic. The team played its home games at Bragg Stadium in Tallahassee, Florida.

The team was recognized as the black college national co-champion. The team played a scoreless tie with Ace Mumford's national co-champion 1950 Southern Jaguars football team. In the final Dickinson rankings, three undefeated black colleges received the following point totals: Florida A&M (28.76); Southern (28.50); and Maryland State (28.00). However, Florida A&M lost to Wilberforce State in the Orange Blossom Classic, after the final Dickinson rankings were released.

== Schedule ==
Date	Opponent	Site	Result	Attendance	Source
September 23	Texas College*	Bragg Stadium; Tallahassee, FL	W 26–6	3,000	
September 30	at Benedict	Antisdel Bowl; Columbia, SC	W 20–13	3,500	
October 7	Fort Valley State	Bragg Stadium; Tallahassee, FL	W 52–13		
October 14	at Morris Brown	Herndon Stadium; Atlanta, GA	W 20–0	8,000	
October 21	North Carolina A&T*	Bragg Stadium; Tallahassee, FL	W 14–9		
October 28	at Bethune–Cookman*	Memorial Stadium; Daytona Beach, FL	W 32–7	3,000	
November 4	Tuskegee^{†}	Bragg Stadium; Tallahassee, FL	W 25–0	8,000	
November 11	Allen	Bragg Stadium; Tallahassee, FL	W 40–13	3,000	
November 18	at Southern*	University Stadium; Baton Rouge, LA	T 0–0	10,000	
December 2	vs. Wilberforce State*	Burdine Stadium; Miami, FL (Orange Blossom Classic)	L 7–13	19,317	
*Non-conference game; ^{†}Homecoming
