= Herman Neilson =

American college sports coach, educator (1907–1978)

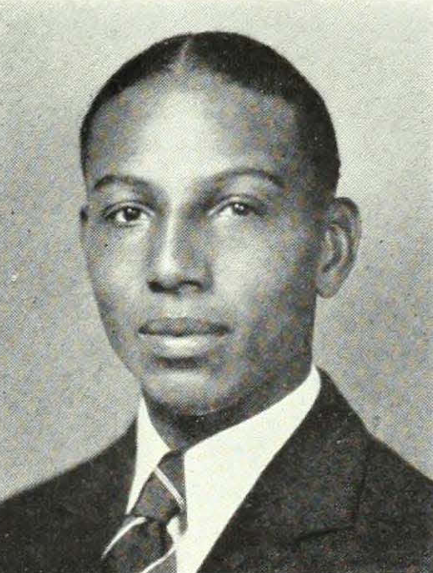
- Neilson pictured in Massasoit 1930, Springfield College yearbook

Biographical details
- Born: December 21, 1907
- Died: September 14, 1978 (aged 70); Hampton, Virginia, U.S.

Playing career

Football
- 1927–1929: Springfield

Basketball
- 1928–1930: Springfield

Track and field
- 1927–1930: Springfield
- Position: Halfback (football)

Coaching career (HC unless noted)

Football
- 1930–1939: Hampton (assistant)
- 1940: Lincoln (MO) (assistant)
- 1942: Florida A&M (assistant)
- 1943–1944: Florida A&M
- 1945–1946: Hampton

Basketball
- 1941–1942: Florida A&M (assistant)
- 1942–1945: Florida A&M

Head coaching record
- Overall: 14–17–2 (football)
- Bowls: 0–2

Accomplishments and honors

Championships
- Football; 1 SIAC (1944)

Herman N. "Buck" Neilson (December 21, 1907 – September 14, 1978) was an American college football, college basketball, and tennis coach. He served as the head football coach at Florida A&M University from 1943 to 1944 and Hampton Institute—now known as Hampton University, compiled a career college football head coaching record of 14–17–2.

A native of Hackensack, New Jersey, and attended Hackensack High School, where he played baseball, football and ran track, in addition to receiving academic honors. He went on to Springfield College in Springfield, Massachusetts, where he lettered in football, basketball, and track and field, before earning a Bachelor of Physical Education degree in 1930. Neilson later received a master's degree from Springfield in physical education and a doctorate in education from New York University.

Neilson began his coaching career in 1930 at Hampton. In addition to assisting Gideon Smith with the football team, he coached track and field, baseball, boxing, tennis, and wrestling at Hampton over the next decade. In 1940, Neilson was appointed assistant professor of physical education and assistant coach at Lincoln University in Jefferson City, Missouri. Neilson succeeded William M. Bell as head football coach at Florida A&M in 1943. He returned to Hampton as the head football coach in 1945.

Neilson died on September 14, 1978, at Hampton General Hospital in Hampton, Virginia, after suffering a heart attack.

== Head coaching record ==
=== Football ===
Year	Team	Overall	Conference	Standing	Bowl/playoffs
Florida A&M Rattlers (Southern Intercollegiate Athletic Conference) (1943–1944)
1943	Florida A&M	1–4–2	1–1–2	4th	L Orange Blossom Classic
1944	Florida A&M	7–3	5–0	1st	L Orange Blossom Classic
Florida A&M:		8–7–2	6–1–2		
Hampton Pirates (Colored Intercollegiate Athletic Association) (1945–1946)
1945	Hampton	2–6	2–6	11th	
1946	Hampton	4–4	4–4	10th	
Hampton:		6–10	6–10		
Total:		14–17–2			
National championship Conference title Conference division title or championship game berth
