= 1957 Florida A&M Rattlers football team =

American college football season

1957 Florida A&M Rattlers football

Black college national champion SIAC champion

Orange Blossom Classic, W 27–21 vs. Maryland State
- Conference: Southern Intercollegiate Athletic Conference
- Record: 9–0 (5–0 SIAC)
- Head coach: Jake Gaither (13th season)
- Home stadium: Bragg Memorial Stadium

1957 Southern Intercollegiate Athletic Conference football standings
	Conf.					Overall
Team	W		L		T	W		L		T
Florida A&M $	5	–	0	–	0	9	–	0	–	0
Morris Brown	4	–	1	–	1	5	–	2	–	1
Fort Valley State	5	–	3	–	0	6	–	3	–	0
South Carolina State	4	–	2	–	1	5	–	2	–	1
Clark (GA)	4	–	2	–	0	5	–	2	–	0
Allen	5	–	2	–	0	6	–	2	–	0
Tuskegee	4	–	2	–	0	4	–	4	–	0
Alabama State	4	–	4	–	0	4	–	5	–	0
Fisk	1	–	3	–	1	1	–	5	–	1
Benedict	2	–	4	–	0	4	–	4	–	0
Morehouse	1	–	4	–	1	2	–	5	–	1
Alabama A&M	2	–	7	–	0	2	–	7	–	0
Bethune–Cookman	1	–	5	–	0	2	–	6	–	0
Knoxville	1	–	5	–	0	1	–	7	–	0
Lane	2	–	1	–	0	4	–	4	–	0
Xavier (LA)	2	–	2	–	0	2	–	5	–	0
$ – Conference champion; Standings were based on Dickinson System ratings. Lane and Xavier did not play the minimum of five conference games to qualify for the standings.

The 1957 Florida A&M Rattlers football team was an American football team that represented Florida A&M University as a member of the Southern Intercollegiate Athletic Conference (SIAC) during the 1957 college football season. In their 13th season under head coach Jake Gaither, the Rattlers compiled a perfect 9–0 record, including a victory over Maryland State in the Orange Blossom Classic for the black college football national championship. The team played its home games at Bragg Memorial Stadium in Tallahassee, Florida.

The team's statistical leaders included Lewis Johnson with 627 rushing yards, James Williams with 383 passing yards, and Alvis Chavis with 146 receiving yards.

== Schedule ==
Date	Opponent	Site	Result	Attendance	Source
October 12	at Fort Valley State	Fort Valley, GA	W 74–0		
October 19	Morris Brown^{†}	Bragg Memorial Stadium; Tallahassee, FL	W 27–0	9,000	
October 26	at Bethune–Cookman	Gator Bowl Stadium; Jacksonville, FL	W 45–6		
November 2	at Benedict	Antisdel Bowl; Columbia, SC	W 40–2		
November 9	at North Carolina A&T*	World War Memorial Stadium; Greensboro, NC	W 42–6	6,000	
November 16	at Allen	Hurst Alumni Stadium; Columbia, SC	W 42–0		
November 23	Southern*	Bragg Memorial Stadium; Tallahassee, FL	W 32–6	6,000	
December 7	North Carolina College*	Bragg Memorial Stadium; Tallahassee, FL	W 14–0		
December 14	vs. Maryland State*	Burdine Stadium; Miami, FL (Orange Blossom Classic)	W 27–21	37,000	
*Non-conference game; ^{†}Homecoming; Source:
