= 1944 Florida A&M Rattlers football team =

American college football season

1944 Florida A&M Rattlers football

SIAC champion

Orange Blossom Classic, L 7–15 vs. Virginia State
- Conference: Southern Intercollegiate Athletic Conference
- Record: 7–3 (5–0 SIAC)
- Head coach: Herman Neilson (2nd season)
- Home stadium: Sampson-Bragg Field

1944 Southern Intercollegiate Athletic Conference football standings
	Conf.					Overall
Team	W		L		T	W		L		T
Florida A&M $	5	–	0	–	0	7	–	3	–	0
Tuskegee	5	–	1	–	0	6	–	4	–	0
Clark (GA)	3	–	2	–	0	5	–	3	–	0
Morehouse	3	–	3	–	0	3	–	4	–	0
Morris Brown	2	–	4	–	0	3	–	4	–	0
Alabama State	1	–	5	–	0	1	–	7	–	0
Knoxville	0	–	1	–	0	4	–	3	–	0
Alabama A&M	0	–	1	–	0	0	–	1	–	0
Xavier (LA)	0	–	2	–	0	3	–	5	–	0
$ – Conference champion

The 1944 Florida A&M Rattlers football team represented Florida A&M University as a member of the Southern Intercollegiate Athletic Conference (SIAC) during the 1944 college football season. Led by second-year head coach Herman Neilson, the Rattlers finished the season as SIAC champion with an overall record of 7–3 and a mark of 5–0 in conference play. Florida A&M was defeated by Virginia State in the Orange Blossom Classic.

== Schedule ==
Date	Opponent	Site	Result	Attendance	Source
October 7	MacDill Field*	Sampson-Bragg Field; Tallahassee, FL	W 13–6		
October 14	Alabama State	Sampson-Bragg Field; Tallahassee, FL	W 45–6		
October 21	at Morris Brown	Ponce de Leon Park; Atlanta, GA	W 19–0		
October 28	at Hampton*	Armstrong Stadium; Hampton, VA	W 40–0		
November 4	Tennessee A&I*	Sampson-Bragg Field; Tallahassee, FL	L 7–19		
November 11	vs. Tuskegee	Durkee Field; Jacksonville, FL	W 14–13		
November 18	Clark (GA)	Sampson-Bragg Field; Tallahassee, FL	W 14–7	5,000	
November 25	at Tennessee A&I*	A&I Gridiron; Nashville, TN	L 0–12		
November 30	Morehouse	Sampson-Bragg Field; Tallahassee, FL	W 33–0		
December 8	vs. Virginia State*	Phillips Field; Tampa, FL (Orange Blossom Classic)	L 7–15	6,000	
*Non-conference game; Source:
