= 1965 Florida A&M Rattlers football team =

American college football season

1965 Florida A&M Rattlers football

SIAC champion

Orange Blossom Classic, L 7–38 vs. Morgan State
- Conference: Southern Intercollegiate Athletic Conference
- Record: 7–3 (5–0 SIAC)
- Head coach: Jake Gaither (21st season)
- Home stadium: Bragg Memorial Stadium

The 1966 Florida A&M Rattlers football team represented Florida A&M University as a member of the Southern Intercollegiate Athletic Conference (SIAC) during the 1965 NCAA College Division football season. Led by 21st-year head coach Jake Gaither, the Rattlers finished the season as SIAC champion with an overall record of 7–3 and a mark of 5–0 in conference play. Florida A&M was defeated by Morgan State in the Orange Blossom Classic.

== Schedule ==
Date	Opponent	Site	Result	Attendance	Source
September 18	at Allen	Perry Stadium; Columbia, SC	W 25–12		
September 25	South Carolina State	Bragg Memorial Stadium; Tallahassee, FL	W 19–13	8,000	
October 9	at Alabama A&M	Milton Frank Stadium; Huntsville, AL	W 28–14		
October 16	Morris Brown	Bragg Memorial Stadium; Tallahassee, FL	W 23–7		
October 23	at Tennessee A&I*	Hale Stadium; Nashville, TN	L 6–45	16,500	
November 6	at North Carolina A&T*	World War Memorial Stadium; Greensboro, NC	W 28–14	7,500	
November 13	Southern*	Bragg Memorial Stadium; Tallahassee, FL	W 41–38	14,000	
November 20	Bethune–Cookman	Bragg Memorial Stadium; Tallahassee, FL (Florida Classic)	W 47–8		
November 27	vs. Texas Southern*	Gator Bowl Stadium; Jacksonville, FL	L 21–34		
December 4	vs. Morgan State*	Miami Orange Bowl; Miami, FL (Orange Blossom Classic)	L 7–38	35,638	
*Non-conference game; Source:
