= 1953 Florida A&M Rattlers football team =

American college football season

1953 Florida A&M Rattlers football

SIAC champion

Orange Blossom Classic, L 27–33 vs. Prairie View A&M
- Conference: Southern Intercollegiate Athletic Conference
- Record: 9–1 (6–0 SIAC)
- Head coach: Jake Gaither (9th season)
- Home stadium: Bragg Stadium

1953 Southern Intercollegiate Athletic Conference football standings
| | Conf. | | | | | Overall |
| Team | W | | L | | T | W | | L | | T |
|---|---|---|---|---|---|---|---|---|---|---|
| No. 2 Florida A&M $ | 6 | – | 0 | – | 0 | 9 | – | 1 | – | 0 |
| Morris Brown | 3 | – | 1 | – | 1 | 4 | – | 5 | – | 1 |
| South Carolina State | 4 | – | 1 | – | 0 | 6 | – | 3 | – | 0 |
| Fort Valley State | 5 | – | 3 | – | 0 | 7 | – | 3 | – | 0 |
| Bethune–Cookman | 3 | – | 1 | – | 2 | 6 | – | 3 | – | 2 |
| Clark (GA) | 5 | – | 3 | – | 0 | 5 | – | 3 | – | 0 |
| Xavier (LA) | 2 | – | 2 | – | 1 | 4 | – | 4 | – | 1 |
| Alabama A&M | 4 | – | 4 | – | 0 | 4 | – | 5 | – | 0 |
| Morehouse | 3 | – | 3 | – | 0 | 5 | – | 3 | – | 0 |
| Fisk | 3 | – | 3 | – | 0 | 3 | – | 5 | – | 0 |
| Alabama State | 3 | – | 4 | – | 0 | 5 | – | 4 | – | 0 |
| Benedict | 3 | – | 5 | – | 0 | 4 | – | 5 | – | 0 |
| Allen | 0 | – | 3 | – | 1 | 3 | – | 5 | – | 2 |
| Tuskegee | 1 | – | 5 | – | 2 | 2 | – | 6 | – | 2 |
| Knoxville | 0 | – | 4 | – | 1 | 2 | – | 5 | – | 2 |
| Lane | 0 | – | 3 | – | 0 | 1 | – | 7 | – | 0 |
$ – Conference champion; Standings were based on Dickinson System ratings.; Rankings from Pittsburgh Courier

The 1953 Florida A&M Rattlers football team was an American football team that represented Florida A&M University as a member of the Southern Intercollegiate Athletic Conference (SIAC) during the 1953 college football season. In their ninth season under head coach Jake Gaither, the Rattlers compiled a 9–1 record. The team's sole loss was to Prairie View A&M in the Orange Blossom Classic. The team played its home games at Bragg Stadium in Tallahassee, Florida.

The October 10 game against Tyndall Air Force Base at Panama City, Florida was an 8–0 victory for the reserve team, not the varsity squad.

== Schedule ==
| Date | Opponent | Site | Result | Attendance | Source |
|---|---|---|---|---|---|
| September 26 | vs. Texas College* | Gator Bowl Stadium; Jacksonville, FL | W 33–0 | 6,000 | |
| October 3 | Benedict | Bragg Stadium; Tallahassee, FL | W 45–0 | 3,000 | |
| October 10 | at Fort Valley State | Fort Valley, GA | W 31–0 | 3,000 | |
| October 17 | Morris Brown^{†} | Bragg Stadium; Tallahassee, FL | W 20–0 | | |
| October 24 | Xavier (LA) | Bragg Stadium; Tallahassee, FL | W 65–0 | | |
| October 31 | Bethune–Cookman | Bragg Stadium; Tallahassee, FL | W 39–7 | | |
| November 7 | at North Carolina A&T* | World War Memorial Stadium; Greensboro, NC | W 33–13 | 17,000 | |
| November 14 | at Allen | Hurst Alumni Stadium; Columbia, SC | W 28–10 | 2,000 | |
| November 21 | Southern* | Bragg Stadium; Tallahassee, FL | W 33–25 | 8,000 | |
| December 5 | vs. Prairie View A&M* | Burdine Stadium; Miami, FL (Orange Blossom Classic) | L 27–33 | 41,313 | |
*Non-conference game; ^{†}Homecoming
