= 1940 Florida A&M Rattlers football team =

American college football season

1940 Florida A&M Rattlers football

Orange Blossom Classic, T 0–0 vs. Wilberforce
- Conference: Southern Intercollegiate Athletic Conference
- Record: 6–1–3 (5–1 SIAC)
- Head coach: William M. Bell (5th season)
- Home stadium: College Field

1940 Southern Intercollegiate Athletic Conference football standings
	Conf.					Overall
Team	W		L		T	W		L		T
Morris Brown $	6	–	1	–	0	9	–	1	–	0
Alabama State	5	–	2	–	0	7	–	2	–	0
Florida A&M	5	–	1	–	0	6	–	1	–	3
Xavier (LA)	3	–	3	–	0	4	–	4	–	0
Tuskegee	4	–	3	–	0	5	–	4	–	0
Clark (GA)	4	–	2	–	0	6	–	3	–	0
Lane	2	–	2	–	1	5	–	3	–	1
Knoxville	2	–	3	–	1	?	–	?	–	?
Morehouse	1	–	5	–	1	1	–	6	–	1
Benedict	1	–	4	–	1	?	–	?	–	?
South Carolina State	1	–	5	–	0	3	–	6	–	0
LeMoyne *	2	–	1	–	0	?	–	?	–	?
Talladega *	1	–	2	–	0	?	–	?	–	?
Fisk *	0	–	3	–	0	?	–	?	–	?
$ – Conference champion; * Conference standings were based on the Dickinson System. Teams that played less than five conference games did not figure in final standings.

The 1940 Florida A&M Rattlers football team represented Florida A&M University as a member of the Southern Intercollegiate Athletic Conference (SIAC) during the 1940 college football season. Led by fifth-year head coach William M. Bell, the Rattlers finished third in the SIAC with an overall record of 6–1–3 and a mark of 5–1 in conference play, placing third in the SIAC standing, which were determined by Dickinson System ratings. Florida A&M tied Wilberforce in the Orange Blossom Classic.

== Schedule ==
Date	Opponent	Site	Result	Attendance	Source
September 28	Benedict	College Field; Tallahassee, FL	W 32–7		
October 5	at North Carolina A&T*	World War Memorial Stadium; Greensboro, NC	W 7–0	10,000	
October 12	Alabama State	College Field; Tallahassee, FL	L 6–7		
October 19	at Kentucky State*	Alumni Stadium; Frankfort, KY	T 7–7	7,000	
October 26	at Morris Brown	Ponce de Leon Park; Atlanta, GA	W 20–13		
November 2	Lane	College Field; Tallahassee, FL	W 7–6		
November 9	at North Carolina College*	Durham Athletic Park; Durham, NC	T 7–7		
November 16	South Carolina State	Centennial Field; Tallahassee, FL	W 20–0		
November 21	at Xavier (LA)	Xavier Stadium; New Orleans, LA	W 14–12		
December 7	vs. Wilberforce*	Orlando Stadium; Orlando, FL (Orange Blossom Classic)	T 0–0	7,000	
*Non-conference game
