= 1952 Florida A&M Rattlers football team =

American college football season

1952 Florida A&M Rattlers football

Black college national champion

Orange Blossom Classic, W 29–7 vs. Virginia State
- Conference: Southern Intercollegiate Athletic Conference
- Record: 8–2 (4–1 SIAC)
- Head coach: Jake Gaither (8th season)
- Home stadium: Bragg Stadium

1952 Southern Intercollegiate Athletic Conference football standings
	Conf.					Overall
Team	W		L		T	W		L		T
Bethune–Cookman $	5	–	1	–	0	9	–	1	–	0
South Carolina State	5	–	1	–	0	7	–	2	–	0
Fisk	5	–	1	–	0	6	–	2	–	0
Florida A&M	4	–	1	–	0	8	–	2	–	0
Allen	4	–	1	–	0	6	–	4	–	0
Lane	2	–	1	–	0	6	–	2	–	0
Morris Brown	4	–	2	–	0	7	–	3	–	0
Xavier (LA)	3	–	2	–	0	4	–	5	–	0
Fort Valley State	4	–	4	–	1	5	–	4	–	1
Alabama State	3	–	4	–	0	4	–	5	–	0
Clark (GA)	3	–	5	–	0	3	–	5	–	0
Knoxville	1	–	2	–	0	2	–	5	–	0
Alabama A&M	1	–	4	–	2	1	–	5	–	2
Morehouse	1	–	5	–	1	3	–	5	–	1
Tuskegee	1	–	6	–	2	2	–	6	–	2
Benedict	1	–	6	–	0	2	–	6	–	0
$ – Conference champion

The 1952 Florida A&M Rattlers football team was an American football team that represented Florida A&M University as a member of the Southern Intercollegiate Athletic Conference (SIAC) during the 1952 college football season. In their eighth season under head coach Jake Gaither, the Rattlers compiled an 8–2 record, including a victory over Virginia State in the Orange Blossom Classic. The team played its home games at Bragg Stadium in Tallahassee, Florida.

Despite its two losses, the Associated Negro Press rated Florida A&M as the black college football national championship by virtue of having played "the nation's most rugged schedule." Lincoln (MO) and Texas Southern were rated second and third, respectively. The Pittsburgh Courier also selected Florida A&M as the national champion under its "Courier DoubleR" rating system, ahead of second-place Virginia State and third-place Lincoln (MO).

== Schedule ==
Date	Opponent	Site	Result	Attendance	Source
September 20	vs. Texas College*	Gator Bowl Stadium; Jacksonville, FL	W 41–13	8,000	
October 4	at Benedict	Antisdel Bowl; Columbia, SC	W 34–7	3,000	
October 11	Fort Valley State	Bragg Stadium; Tallahassee, FL	W 51–0	3,800	
October 18	at Morris Brown	Herndon Stadium; Atlanta, GA	W 27–7	12,000	
October 25	Prairie View A&M*	Bragg Stadium; Tallahassee, FL	W 10–7		
November 1	at Bethune–Cookman	Memorial Stadium; Daytona Beach, FL	L 7–8	7,000	
November 8	North Carolina A&T*^{†}	Bragg Stadium; Tallahassee, FL	W 19–12	10,000	
November 15	Allen	Bragg Stadium; Tallahassee, FL	W 45–7		
November 27	at Southern*	Memorial Stadium; Baton Rouge, LA	L 13–25	10,000	
December 6	vs. Virginia State*	Burdine Stadium; Miami, FL (Orange Blossom Classic)	W 29–7	35,064	
*Non-conference game; ^{†}Homecoming
