= 1937 Florida A&M Rattlers football team =

American college football season

1937 Florida A&M Rattlers football

SIAC champion

Orange Blossom Classic, W 25–20 vs. Hampton Prairie View Bowl, L 14–27 vs. Prairie View
- Conference: Southern Intercollegiate Athletic Conference
- Record: 6–1–1 (5–0–1 SIAC)
- Head coach: William M. Bell (2nd season)
- Home stadium: College Field

1937 Southern Intercollegiate Athletic Conference football standings
	Conf.					Overall
Team	W		L		T	W		L		T
Florida A&M $	5	–	0	–	1	7	–	1	–	1
LeMoyne	5	–	0	–	0	8	–	2	–	0
Morris Brown	5	–	2	–	0	6	–	3	–	0
Xavier (LA)	3	–	1	–	0	6	–	3	–	1
South Carolina State	2	–	2	–	1	5	–	3	–	2
Tuskegee	3	–	2	–	1	6	–	3	–	1
Knoxville	3	–	2	–	1	6	–	3	–	1
Morehouse	2	–	3	–	2	2	–	3	–	2
Alabama State	3	–	6	–	0	3	–	7	–	0
Lane	1	–	2	–	0	5	–	2	–	1
Talladega	0	–	3	–	1	0	–	4	–	2
Fisk	0	–	4	–	1	0	–	4	–	3
Clark (GA)	0	–	5	–	0	1	–	6	–	0
$ – Conference champion; Standings were based on Dickinson System ratings.

The 1937 Florida A&M Rattlers football team was an American football team that represented Florida A&M College as a member of the Southern Intercollegiate Athletic Conference (SIAC) during the 1937 college football season. In their second season under head coach William M. Bell, the Rattlers compiled an overall record of 6–1–1 record with a mark of 5–0–1 in conference play, winning the SIAC title, and outscored opponents by a total of 132 to 74. In postseason play, the Rattlers defeated Hampton in the Orange Blossom Classic and then lost to Prairie View in the Prairie View Bowl on New Year's Day. The Rattlers played their home games at College Field in Tallahassee, Florida.

Jake Gaither, who later led the Rattlers from 1945 to 1969, was an assistant coach for the 1937 team.

== Schedule ==
Date	Time	Opponent	Site	Result	Attendance	Source
October 2		Lane	College Field; Tallahassee, FL	W 12–0		
October 9		at Alabama State	Cramton Bowl; Montgomery, AL	W 7–0		
October 18		at Clark (GA)	Ponce de Leon Park; Atlanta, GA	W 14–6		
October 30		Morris Brown^{†}	College Field; Tallahassee, FL	W 9–7	3,000	
November 13	2:30 p.m.	at South Carolina State	Orangeburg County Stadium; Orangeburg, SC	T 7–7	3,000	
November 20		Knoxville	College Field; Tallahassee, FL	W 31–0		
December 4	2:30 p.m.	vs. Hampton*	Tinker Field; Orlando, FL (Orange Blossom Classic)	W 25–20	3,000–3,500	
January 1, 1938	3:30 p.m.	vs. Prairie View*	Buffalo Stadium; Houston, TX (Prairie View Bowl)	L 14–27	4,500	
*Non-conference game; ^{†}Homecoming; All times are in Eastern time
