= 1942 Florida A&M Rattlers football team =

American college football season

1942 Florida A&M Rattlers football

Black college national champion SIAC champion

Orange Blossom Classic, W 12–6 vs. Texas College
- Conference: Southern Intercollegiate Athletic Conference
- Record: 9–0 (7–0 SIAC)
- Head coach: William M. Bell (7th season)
- Home stadium: Sampson-Bragg Field

1942 Southern Intercollegiate Athletic Conference football standings
| | Conf. | | | | | Overall |
| Team | W | | L | | T | W | | L | | T |
|---|---|---|---|---|---|---|---|---|---|---|
| Florida A&M $ | 7 | – | 0 | – | 0 | 9 | – | 0 | – | 0 |
| Tuskegee | 6 | – | 1 | – | 0 | 7 | – | 3 | – | 0 |
| Lane | 4 | – | 1 | – | 0 | 7 | – | 4 | – | 0 |
| Morris Brown | 3 | – | 2 | – | 1 | 5 | – | 2 | – | 1 |
| Clark (GA) | 4 | – | 1 | – | 2 | 4 | – | 1 | – | 2 |
| South Carolina State | 4 | – | 2 | – | 1 | 4 | – | 2 | – | 1 |
| Xavier (LA) | 2 | – | 3 | – | 0 | 3 | – | 6 | – | 0 |
| Benedict | 2 | – | 3 | – | 0 | 4 | – | 5 | – | 0 |
| Alabama A&M | 2 | – | 3 | – | 0 | 3 | – | 5 | – | 0 |
| Morehouse | 1 | – | 5 | – | 0 | 3 | – | 5 | – | 0 |
| Alabama State | 0 | – | 8 | – | 0 | 0 | – | 8 | – | 0 |
| Knoxville | 0 | – | 7 | – | 0 | 0 | – | 7 | – | 0 |
$ – Conference champion; Standings were based on Dickinson System ratings.

The 1942 Florida A&M Rattlers football team was an American football team that represented Florida A&M College as a member of the Southern Intercollegiate Athletic Conference (SIAC) during the 1942 college football season. In their seventh and final season under head coach "Big Bill" Bell, the Rattlers compiled a perfect 9–0 record, defeated Texas College in the Orange Blossom Classic, and won the black college national championship. The Rattlers played their home games at Sampson-Bragg Field in Tallahassee, Florida.

== Schedule ==
| Date | Opponent | Site | Result | Attendance | Source |
|---|---|---|---|---|---|
| October 3 | at North Carolina A&T* | World War Memorial Stadium; Greensboro, NC | W 6–0 | 2,000 | |
| October 10 | Alabama State | Sampson-Bragg Field; Tallahassee, FL | W 26–0 | 3,000 | |
| October 24 | at Morris Brown | Ponce de Leon Park; Atlanta, GA | W 14–6 | 2,000 | |
| October 31 | Lane^{†} | Sampson-Bragg Field; Tallahassee, FL | W 21–0 | | |
| November 6 | vs. Tuskegee | Durkee Field; Jacksonville, FL | W 20–7 | 5,000 | |
| November 14 | Benedict | Sampson-Bragg Field; Tallahassee, FL | W 60–7 | | |
| November 21 | Alabama A&M | Sampson-Bragg Field; Tallahassee, FL | W 30–0 | | |
| November 26 | at Xavier (LA) | Xavier Stadium; New Orleans, LA | W 44–14 | 2,500 | |
| December 12 | vs. Texas College* | Durkee Field; Jacksonville, FL (Orange Blossom Classic) | W 12–6 | 3,000 | |
*Non-conference game; ^{†}Homecoming; Source:
