= 1943 Florida A&M Rattlers football team =

American college football season

1943 Florida A&M Rattlers football

Orange Blossom Classic, L 0–39 vs. Hampton
- Conference: Southern Intercollegiate Athletic Conference
- Record: 1–4–2 (1–1–2 SIAC)
- Head coach: Herman Neilson (1st season)
- Home stadium: Sampson-Bragg Field

1943 Southern Intercollegiate Athletic Conference football standings
	Conf.					Overall
Team	W		L		T	W		L		T
Tuskegee $	4	–	1	–	1	9	–	2	–	1
Morris Brown	2	–	1	–	3	2	–	1	–	3
Clark (GA)	3	–	2	–	0	3	–	3	–	0
Florida A&M	1	–	1	–	2	7	–	3	–	0
Morehouse	1	–	2	–	1	2	–	2	–	1
Alabama State	1	–	3	–	1	1	–	4	–	1
Xavier (LA)	0	–	2	–	0	0	–	4	–	1
$ – Conference champion

The 1943 Florida A&M Rattlers football team represented Florida A&M University as a member of the Southern Intercollegiate Athletic Conference (SIAC) during the 1943 college football season. Led by first-year head coach Herman Neilson, the Rattlers finished the season with an overall record of 1–4–2 and a mark of 1–1–2 in conference play, placing fourth in the SIAC. Florida A&M was defeated by Hampton in the Orange Blossom Classic.

== Schedule ==
Date	Opponent	Site	Result	Attendance	Source
October 16	at Alabama State	Cramton Bowl; Montgomery, AL	T 6–6		
October 23	Morris Brown	Sampson-Bragg Field; Tallahassee, FL	T 0–0		
October 30	at Fort Benning*	Soldier Field; Columbus, GA	L 6–19		
November 5	vs. Morgan State*	Griffith Stadium; Washington, DC	L 0–50	14,000	
November 13	vs. Tuskegee	Durkee Field; Jacksonville, FL	L 6–19	3,000	
November 18	at Clark (GA)	Ponce de Leon Park; Atlanta, GA	W 14–9		
December 4	vs. Hampton*	Durkee Field; Jacksonville, FL (Orange Blossom Classic)	L 0–39	2,500	
*Non-conference game; Source:
