= 1938 Florida A&M Rattlers football team =

American college football season

1938 Florida A&M Rattlers football

Black college national champion SIAC champion

Orange Blossom Classic, W 9–7 vs. Kentucky State
- Conference: Southern Intercollegiate Athletic Conference
- Record: 8–0 (6–0 SIAC)
- Head coach: William M. Bell (3rd season)
- Home stadium: College Field

1938 Southern Intercollegiate Athletic Conference football standings
	Conf.					Overall
Team	W		L		T	W		L		T
Florida A&M $	6	–	0	–	0	8	–	0	–	0
Morris Brown	6	–	1	–	1	6	–	2	–	1
Morehouse	4	–	1	–	1	4	–	3	–	1
LeMoyne	4	–	1	–	0	5	–	2	–	0
Xavier (LA)	3	–	1	–	1	4	–	3	–	3
Alabama State	4	–	4	–	1	4	–	4	–	1
Lane	3	–	2	–	0	4	–	3	–	0
South Carolina State	2	–	3	–	0	3	–	5	–	0
Fisk	2	–	3	–	1	2	–	3	–	2
Tuskegee	1	–	4	–	2	1	–	7	–	2
Clark (GA)	0	–	6	–	1	0	–	6	–	1
Knoxville	0	–	7	–	1	0	–	8	–	1
Talladega	0	–	2	–	1	0	–	5	–	1
$ – Conference champion; Standings were based on Dickinson System ratings.

The 1938 Florida A&M Rattlers football team was an American football team that represented Florida A&M College as a member of the Southern Intercollegiate Athletic Conference (SIAC) during the 1938 college football season. In their third season under head coach William "Big Bill" Bell, the Rattlers compiled a perfect 8–0 record, defeated Kentucky State in the Orange Blossom Classic, outscored opponents by a total of 189 to 7, and were recognized as the black college national championship. The Rattlers played their home games at College Field in Tallahassee, Florida.

The team gained acclaim for not allowing a single point by opponents during the regular season. In seven regular season games, the Rattlers outscored opponents by a total of 180 to 0. Hailing the team as the pride of Florida, one sports writer observed: "The brand of football these colored lads have been turning out is so good that 'white folks' have been flocking to their games this year throughout the south."

The team's acclaimed backfield, made up of quarterback Henry Butler, fullback Stanley Strachan, and halfbacks John D. Harris and Tom "Tank" Jones, was known as the "Four Ghosts".

The line, known as the "Seven Rocks", did not allow a first down against Tuskegee. Defensively, the team still holds school records for both fewest yards allowed (951 yards in eight games) and fewest first downs allowed (53 in eight games).

Jake Gaither, who later led the Rattlers from 1945 to 1969, was an assistant coach for the 1938 team.

== Schedule ==
Date	Opponent	Site	Result	Source
September 30	at North Carolina A&T*	Greensboro, NC	W 13–0	
October 15	Alabama State	College Field; Tallahassee, FL	W 17–0	
October 22	Clark (GA)	College Field; Tallahassee, FL	W 33–0	
October 29	at Morris Brown	Ponce de Leon Park; Atlanta, GA	W 16–0	
November 5	Tuskegee	College Field; Tallahassee, FL	W 40–0	
November 12	South Carolina State	College Field; Tallahassee, FL	W 41–0	
November 19	at Knoxville	Knoxville, TN	W 20–0	
December 3	vs. Kentucky State*	Tinker Field; Orlando, FL (Orange Blossom Classic)	W 9–7	
*Non-conference game
