= Rudy Hubbard =

American football player and coach (born 1946)

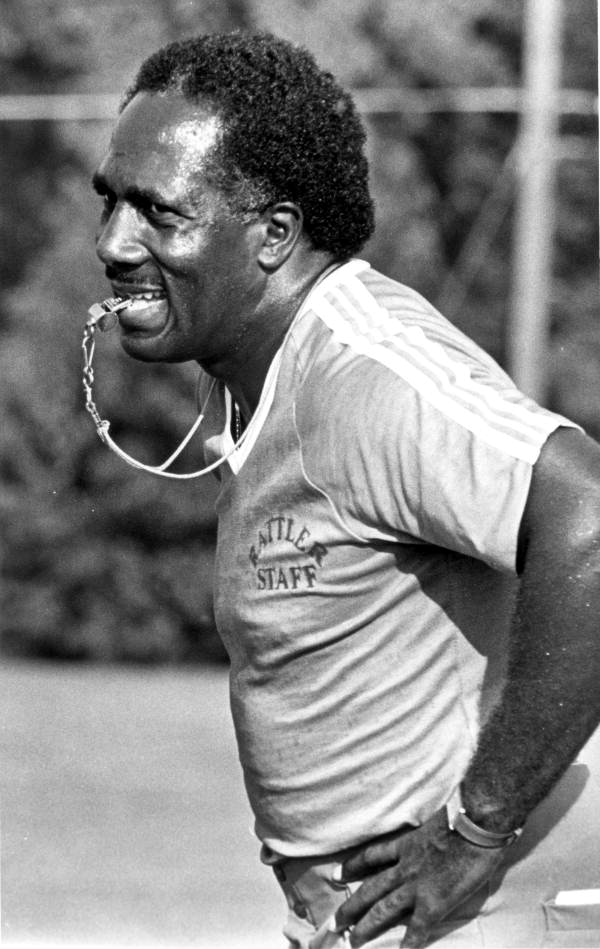

Biographical details
- Born: 1946 (age 79–80); Hubbard, Ohio, U.S.

Playing career
- 1965–1967: Ohio State
- Position: Running back

Coaching career (HC unless noted)
- 1968–1973: Ohio State (assistant)
- 1974–1985: Florida A&M
- 2008–2011: James S. Rickards HS (FL)

Head coaching record
- Overall: 83–48–3 (college); 12–25 (high school)
- Bowls: 5–0
- Tournaments: 2–0 (NCAA D-I-AA playoffs)

Accomplishments and honors

Championships
- 1 NCAA Division I-AA (1978); 2 black college national (1977–1978); 2 SIAC (1977–1978)

Awards
- Florida A&M University Athletics Hall of Fame (1990)
- College Football Hall of Fame; Inducted in 2021 (profile)

Rudy Hubbard (born 1946) is an American former football player and coach. He served as the head football coach at Florida A&M University (FAMU) in Tallahassee, Florida from 1974 to 1985, compiling a record of 83–48–3. Hubbard led the Florida A&M Rattlers to the inaugural NCAA Division I-AA Football Championship, in 1978, and consecutive black college football national championships, in 1977 and 1978. Hubbard played college football at Ohio State University, lettering from 1965 to 1967. Following his graduation from Ohio State in 1968, he remained with the Buckeyes for six seasons as an assistant coach under Woody Hayes. In 2008, Hubbard returned to coaching the high school level, serving as head football coach at James S. Rickards High School in Tallahassee for four seasons.

Hubbard was inducted into the College Football Hall of Fame as a coach in 2021.

== Early life ==
Hubbard was born in 1946 in Hubbard, Ohio, a small steel mill town near Youngstown. He attended Ohio State University, where he was a running back from 1965 to 1967. After graduation, Hubbard was hired by then head coach Woody Hayes as an assistant coach in 1968, making Hubbard the first African-American on the coaching staff of the Ohio State Buckeyes football team. He stayed on the coaching staff for six seasons before moving on to take the head coach position at Florida A&M University in 1974.

== Florida A&M ==
After a 6–5 mark in Hubbard's first year in 1974, the Rattlers went 9–2 in 1975, 6–3–2 in 1976, then began a stretch from the 1977 to 1979 seasons, where they went 30–5. The Rattlers went unbeaten at 11–0 in 1977, and in 1978 the Rattlers went 12–1 and wrapped up the season winning the inaugural NCAA Division I-AA Football Championship held in Wichita Falls, Texas on December 16, 1978, defeating the UMass Minutemen by the score 35–28. Florida A&M remains the only Historically black college to have won the NCAA Division I-AA Football Championship. In 1979, the Rattlers went 7–4 but made an exclamation mark in the season with a 16–13 defeat of the Division I Miami Hurricanes. Hubbard spent 12 seasons with the Rattlers, and posted an 83–48–3 (.631) overall record, the third most wins in school history behind fellow FAMU head coaches Jake Gaither (203) and Billy Joe (86). The Rattlers also won two Black college football national championships in 1977 (shared with Grambling State and South Carolina State) and in 1978. During Hubbard's tenure, FAMU transitioned from the NCAA Division II's Southern Intercollegiate Athletic Conference (SIAC) to NCAA Division I-AA independent status, and then joined Mid-Eastern Athletic Conference (MEAC) in 1980.

The players under Hubbard who went on to play in the National Football League (NFL) were Frank Marion (linebacker), Ralph Hill (offensive lineman), Tony Samuels (tight end), Clarence Hawkins (running back), Greg Coleman (punter), Gene Atkins (defensive back), Tyrone McGriff (guard), and Nate Newton (Pro Bowl offensive lineman). Vince Coleman (Greg Coleman's cousin), was a kicker at FAMU under Hubbard, and a standout player on the FAMU baseball team, went on to a career in Major League Baseball.

== Later life ==
Hubbard was relieved of his head coaching duties after the 1985 season. He then took a long hiatus away from the coaching scene, working as an independent financial advisor. In 1990, he was inducted into the Florida A&M University Athletics Hall of Fame. In 2008, Hubbard reemerged on the coaching scene, when he was hired as head football coach at James S. Rickards High School in Tallahassee, Florida, where he currently resides. After compiling a record of 12–25 over four years, Hubbard stepped down from his position at Rickards following the 2011 season.

== Head coaching record ==
=== College ===
Year	Team	Overall	Conference	Standing	Bowl/playoffs	NCAA^{#}
Florida A&M Rattlers (Southern Intercollegiate Athletic Conference) (1974–1978)
1974	Florida A&M	6–5	3–2	3rd (Division I)	W Orange Blossom Classic	
1975	Florida A&M	9–2	4–1	2nd (Division I)	W Orange Blossom Classic	
1976	Florida A&M	6–3–2	3–1–1	T–2nd (Division I)	W Orange Blossom Classic	
1977	Florida A&M	11–0	5–0	1st (Division I)	W Orange Blossom Classic	
1978	Florida A&M	12–1	5–0	1st	W Orange Blossom Classic, W NCAA Division I-AA Championship†	3
Florida A&M Rattlers (NCAA Division I-AA independent) (1979)
1979	Florida A&M	7–4				
Florida A&M Rattlers (Mid-Eastern Athletic Conference) (1980–1983)
1980	Florida A&M	5–6	2–3	5th		
1981	Florida A&M	7–4	4–1	2nd		
1982	Florida A&M	6–5	4–1	2nd		
1983	Florida A&M	7–4	NA	NA		
Florida A&M Rattlers (NCAA Division I-AA independent) (1984–1985)
1984	Florida A&M	3–7–1				
1985	Florida A&M	4–7				
Florida A&M:		83–48–3	30–9–1			
Total:		83–48–3				
National championship Conference title Conference division title or championship game berth
^{#}Rankings from final NCAA I-AA Poll.

† In 1978, FAMU was a member of SIAC, an NCAA Division II conference. FAMU had successfully petitioned the NCAA for Division I classification (Division I-AA in football), which took effect on September 1, 1978.
