= Jake Gaither =

American football coach, athletics administrator (1903–1994)

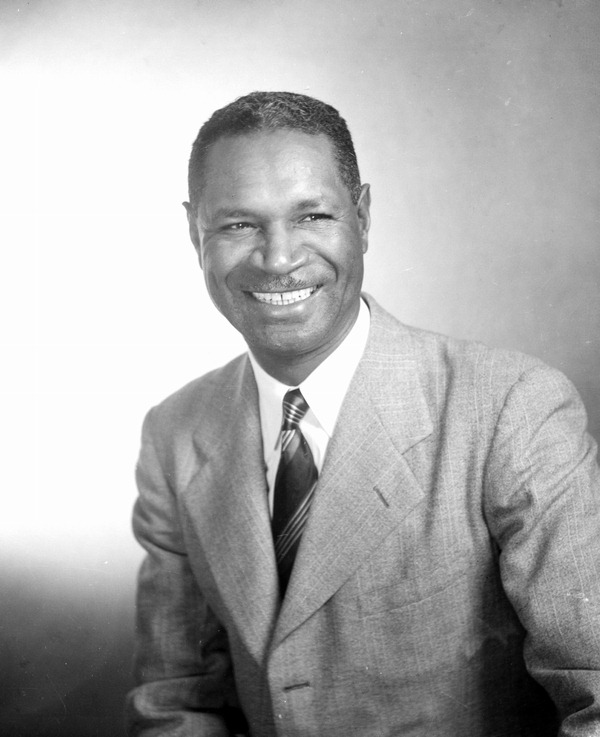

Biographical details
- Born: April 11, 1903; Dayton, Tennessee, U.S.
- Died: February 18, 1994 (aged 90); Tallahassee, Florida, U.S.

Playing career

Football
- c. 1925: Knoxville
- Position: End

Coaching career (HC unless noted)

Football
- 1927–1934: Henderson Institute (NC)
- 1935: Saint Paul (VA) (assistant)
- 1936: Saint Paul (VA)
- 1937–1944: Florida A&M (assistant)
- 1945–1969: Florida A&M

Basketball
- c. 1927–1935: Henderson Institute (NC)
- 1935–1936: Saint Paul (VA) (assistant)
- 1936–1937: Saint Paul (VA)
- 1937–1942: Florida A&M

Baseball
- c. 1928–1935: Henderson Institute (NC)

Track and field
- c. 1927–1935: Henderson Institute (NC)
- 1935–1936: Saint Paul (VA) (assistant)
- 1936–1937: Saint Paul (VA)

Administrative career (AD unless noted)
- 1945–1973: Florida A&Ml

Head coaching record
- Overall: 205–41–5 (college football)
- Bowls: 12–13–1

Accomplishments and honors

Championships
- Football; 1 AP small college national (1962); 8 black college national (1950, 1952–1954, 1957, 1959, 1961–1962); 19 SIAC (1945–1950, 1953–1965); 3 SIAC Division I (1967–1969)

Awards
- Football; NAIA Coach of the Year (1969); Walter Camp Man of the Year (1974); Amos Alonzo Stagg Award (1975)
- College Football Hall of Fame; Inducted in 1975 (profile)

Alonzo Smith "Jake" Gaither (April 11, 1903 – February 18, 1994) was an American college football coach and athletics administrator. He served as the head football coach at the Saint Paul Normal and Industrial School—later known as Saint Paul's College—in Lawrenceville, Virginia for one season, in 1937, and at Florida A&M University (FAMU) from 1945 to 1969. In 25 seasons as head coach of the Florida A&M Rattlers football program, his teams had a record of 203–36–4, and won six black college football national championships. His won–loss record is among the best of any college football coach. Gaither also coached basketball at Saint Paul and Florida A&M, and was the athletic director at the latter. He was inducted into the College Football Hall of Fame as a coach in 1975.

== Early life and education ==
Gaither was born on April 11, 1903, in Dayton, Tennessee. His father was a preacher, and as a youth, Gaither expected to also become a preacher. He graduated from Knoxville College, where he played football as an end. Gaither's father died around that time, and Gaither became a high school football coach to help support his family. Gaither completed a master's degree at Ohio State University in 1937.

== Coaching career ==
Gaither began his coaching career in 1927 at Henderson Institute, a secondary school in Henderson, North Carolina. In 1935, he was hired by the Saint Paul Normal and Industrial School—later known as Saint Paul's College—in Lawrenceville, Virginia as an assistant coach in football, basketball, and track and field. The following year, he succeeded Theodore H. Smith as head coach and assistant director of physical education at Saint Paul. Gaither led Saint Paul's football team to a record of 2–5–1 in 1936. His basketball team that winter had a record of 6–10.

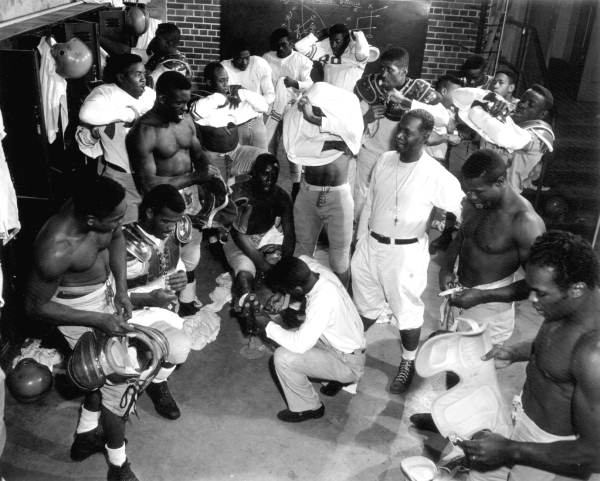
Gaither (standing, middle, white shirt with whistle) in the locker room with his 1953 Florida A&M Rattlers football team

Gaither went to work as an assistant to head coach William M. Bell at Florida Agricultural and Mechanical College for Negroes—now known as Florida A&M University (FAMU)— in 1937. The FAMC Rattlers had an undefeated (8–0) season that year, and won their first black college football national championship. The school won the national title again in 1942. Bell left to enter military service in 1943. After two years of problems in the football program, Gaither was hired as the head football coach for Florida A&M College in 1945. One story is that the president of the college could not find anyone else to take the job.

Gaither worked very hard to motivate his players. He would say, "I like my boys to be agile, mobile, and hostile." It is reported that he would hide an onion in his handkerchief to work up tears in his pre-game pep talks. He built up an effective recruiting network; in the days of Jim Crow, he had the pick of every good black high school player in Florida. Indeed, by the 1960s did not even bother to recruit players from outside the state. Gaither was dedicated to his job. After retiring, he told his biographer, "I run into so many people who have no deep sense of morals—people who got a price tag on them, who'd sell their soul. I want to find the man who has no price tag on him. I'm not for sale."

Gaither instituted an annual coaching clinic at FAMU in the late 1950s. He recruited major college coaches, including Paul "Bear" Bryant, Frank Broyles, Darrell Royal, Woody Hayes and Adolph Rupp, among others, to staff the clinics.

Gaither introduced the Split-T formation in 1963, and it was soon adopted at other colleges. In 1969 Florida A&M defeated the Spartans of the University of Tampa, 34–28, in the South's first football game between a white college and a historically black college.

Gaither later became director of athletics and chairman of the Department of Health, Physical Education and Recreation at FAMU. He continued to hold the last two positions after he retired as coach until his retirement from teaching in 1973.

== Legacy and death ==
When Gaither retired from coaching in 1969, his Florida A&M teams had a 204–36–4 record, for a .844 winning percentage. Thirty-six players from Gaither's teams were All-Americans, and 42 went on to play in the National Football League (NFL). Gaither was named Southern Intercollegiate Athletic Conference Coach of the Decade. He was named College Division Coach of the Year by the American Football Coaches Association in 1962, and was voted into the College Football Hall of Fame in 1975. He also received the Amos Alonzo Stagg Award that year, and the Walter Camp Man of the Year award in 1974. The Jake Gaither Trophy has been awarded to the best black college football player each year since 1978. The Jake Gaither Gymnasium is located on the FAMU campus.

Gaither died on February 18, 1994, in Tallahassee, Florida. The Jake Gaither House, where he lived, is now a cultural center.

== Head coaching record ==
=== College football ===
Year	Team	Overall	Conference	Standing	Bowl/playoffs	AP^{#}	UPI^{°}
Saint Paul Tigers (Colored Intercollegiate Athletic Association) (1936)
1936	Saint Paul	2–5–1	2–5–1	T–9th			
Saint Paul:		2–5–1	2–5–1				
Florida A&M Rattlers (Southern Intercollegiate Athletic Conference) (1945–1969)
1945	Florida A&M	9–1	6–0	1st	L Orange Blossom Classic		
1946	Florida A&M	6–4–1	6–0	1st	L Orange Blossom Classic, T Angel Bowl		
1947	Florida A&M	9–1	5–0	1st	W Orange Blossom Classic		
1948	Florida A&M	8–2	6–0	1st	L Orange Blossom Classic		
1949	Florida A&M	7–2	6–0	1st	L Orange Blossom Classic		
1950	Florida A&M	8–1–1	5–0	T–1st	L Orange Blossom Classic		
1951	Florida A&M	7–1–1	4–1	3rd	W Orange Blossom Classic		
1952	Florida A&M	8–2	4–1	T–4th	W Orange Blossom Classic		
1953	Florida A&M	9–1	6–0	1st	L Orange Blossom Classic		
1954	Florida A&M	8–1	4–0	1st	W Orange Blossom Classic		
1955	Florida A&M	7–1–1	6–0	1st	L Orange Blossom Classic		
1956	Florida A&M	8–1	5–0	1st	L Orange Blossom Classic		
1957	Florida A&M	9–0	5–0	1st	W Orange Blossom Classic		
1958	Florida A&M	7–2	5–0	1st	L Orange Blossom Classic		
1959	Florida A&M	10–0	5–0	1st	W Orange Blossom Classic		14
1960	Florida A&M	9–1	5–0	1st	W Orange Blossom Classic		5
1961	Florida A&M	10–0	5–0	1st	W Orange Blossom Classic	4	6
1962	Florida A&M	9–1	5–0	T–1st	L Orange Blossom Classic	1	2
1963	Florida A&M	8–2	3–0	1st	W Orange Blossom Classic	7	6
1964	Florida A&M	9–1	3–0		W Orange Blossom Classic	9	12
1965	Florida A&M	7–3	5–0		L Orange Blossom Classic		
1966	Florida A&M	7–3	4–1		W Orange Blossom Classic		
1967	Florida A&M	8–2	5–0	1st (Division I)	L Orange Blossom Classic		
1968	Florida A&M	8–2	5–0	1st (Division I)	L Orange Blossom Classic		T–19
1969	Florida A&M	8–1	4–0	1st (Division I)	W Orange Blossom Classic	16	
Florida A&M:		203–36–4	122–3				
Total:		205–41–5					
National championship Conference title Conference division title or championship game berth

== See also ==
- List of college football career coaching winning percentage leaders
- List of college football career coaching wins leaders
