= William M. Bell =

Biographical details
- Born: June 10, 1909; Polk County, Georgia, U.S.
- Died: June 10, 1991 (aged 82); Fayetteville, North Carolina, U.S.

Playing career
- 1929–1931: Ohio State
- Position: Tackle

Coaching career (HC unless noted)
- 1932–1933: Howard (assistant)
- 1934–1935: Claflin
- 1936–1942: Florida A&M
- 1946–1956: North Carolina A&T

Administrative career (AD unless noted)
- 1934–1936: Claflin
- ?–c. 1968: North Carolina A&T
- 1969–1975: Fayetteville State

Head coaching record
- Overall: 111–48–17
- Bowls: 6–3–1

Accomplishments and honors

Championships
- 2 black college national (1938, 1942); 2 SAAC (1934–1935); 3 SIAC (1937–1938, 1942); 1 CIAA (1950)

Awards
- Second-team All-Big Ten (1931)

William McNeil "Big Bill" Bell Sr. (June 10, 1909 – May 10, 1991) was an American college football player and coach and athletics administrator. He served as the head football coach at Claflin University in Orangeburg, South Carolina from 1934 to 1935, Florida A&M University from 1936 to 1942, and North Carolina A&T State University from 1946 to 1956.

After graduating from Ohio State in 1932, Bell was an assistant coach at Howard University in Washington, D.C. for two years. In 1934, he was hired as athletic director and head football coach at Claflin.

Bell married the former Henrietta Louise Lee of Charleston, South Carolina.

== Head coaching record ==
Year	Team	Overall	Conference	Standing	Bowl/playoffs
Claflin Panthers (South Atlantic Athletic Conference) (1934–1935)
1934	Claflin	5–2–3		1st	
1935	Claflin	7–1–1		1st	
Claflin:		12–3–4			
Florida A&M Rattlers (Southern Intercollegiate Athletic Conference) (1936–1942)
1936	Florida A&M	2–4–1	2–2–1		L Orange Blossom Classic
1937	Florida A&M	6–1–1	5–0–1	1st	W Orange Blossom Classic, L Prairie View
1938	Florida A&M	8–0	6–0	1st	W Orange Blossom Classic
1939	Florida A&M	6–2–1	4–2	2nd	W Orange Blossom Classic
1940	Florida A&M	6–1–3	5–1	3rd	T Orange Blossom Classic
1941	Florida A&M	8–1	4–1	T–3rd	W Orange Blossom Classic
1942	Florida A&M	9–0	7–0	1st	W Orange Blossom Classic
Florida A&M:		45–9–6	33–6–2		
North Carolina A&T Aggies (Colored/Central Intercollegiate Athletic Association) (1946–1956)
1946	North Carolina A&T	4–4	3–4	7th	
1947	North Carolina A&T	3–4–1	2–4–1		
1948	North Carolina A&T	4–4–1	4–2–1	4th	L Vulcan
1949	North Carolina A&T	7–2	5–1	3rd	W Orange Blossom Classic
1950	North Carolina A&T	6–2–1	5–0–1	1st	
1951	North Carolina A&T	7–1–1	5–1	2nd	
1952	North Carolina A&T	6–4	5–2	3rd	
1953	North Carolina A&T	4–4	4–2	4th	
1954	North Carolina A&T	4–6	2–5	11th	
1955	North Carolina A&T	4–1–3	4–1–2	2nd	
1956	North Carolina A&T	5–4	3–3	9th	
North Carolina A&T:		54–36–7	42–25–5		
Total:		111–48–17			
National championship Conference title Conference division title or championship game berth
