= Florida Classic =

American college football rivalry

- Bethune–Cookman Wildcats Florida A&M Rattlers
- Sport: Football
- First meeting: 1925; Florida A&M, 23–0
- Latest meeting: 2026; Florida A&M, 27–14
- Next meeting: November 20, 2027
- Stadiums: Camping World Stadium, Orlando, Florida

Statistics
- Total meetings: 81
- All-time series: Florida A&M leads, 55–25–1
- Largest victory: Florida A&M, 97–0 (1960)
- Longest win streak: Florida A&M, 19 (1953–1972)
- Current win streak: Florida A&M, 1 (2026–present)

Locations of Bethune–Cookman and Florida A&M as well as the current host stadium

The Florida Classic is the annual college football rivalry game between Bethune–Cookman University and Florida A&M University. The game is operated by Florida Citrus Sports, a non-profit group that also organizes the Pop-Tarts Bowl and Citrus Bowl. The Classic has approximately a $31 million impact on Orlando's economy; it was the largest MEAC conference football game before the schools left for the SWAC, and remains the largest Division I FCS football game in Florida.

== History ==
College Comparison
	BCU	FAMU
Ownership	Bethune–Cookman University	State University System of Florida
Location	Daytona Beach, FL	Tallahassee, FL
Conference	Southwestern Athletic Conference	Southwestern Athletic Conference
Students	4,045	9,928
School colors		
Nickname	Wildcats	Rattlers
Mascot(s)	Dr. Wyle D. Cat	Venom
Football stadium	Daytona Stadium	Bragg Memorial Stadium

Florida A&M won the first Florida Classic game in 1978, 27–17, overcoming a 17–0 halftime deficit. The team went on to win the inaugural NCAA Division I-AA championship. Bethune–Cookman made the series competitive starting in 1973, winning 11 of their 14 series victories during that span, including a 58–52 overtime win in 2004, which was the first-ever three-peat for the 'Cats in the overall series, which dates back to the 1920s. Florida A&M holds an 25–18 edge in the meetings since the instate rivalry moved from a home-and-home scenario to an annual neutral site game in Tampa Stadium in 1978.

The two schools went through a two-year hiatus in 1983 and 1984, when they could not agree on a playing site, but public pressure from alumni, fans and state officials brought them back to the negotiating table and they resumed the series in 1985. Bethune–Cookman won the rivalry renewal game, 31–27 in 1985.

The 1997–2007 games saw the Florida Classic revived to the point that it overshadowed the drawing power of the Bayou Classic in New Orleans, between Grambling and Southern University in terms of attendance. In 1998, 66,245 packed the Florida Citrus Bowl Stadium for the game which determined the 1998 MEAC Championship and postseason invitations. In 1999, the game drew 70,125 fans to Orlando, the sixth-largest football event ever held in the Orlando Citrus Bowl Stadium. The 2000 MEAC title game drew 70,719 to see a 31–28 thriller won by the Rattlers. The 2003 game stands as the largest crowd ever in the series with 73,358 in attendance.

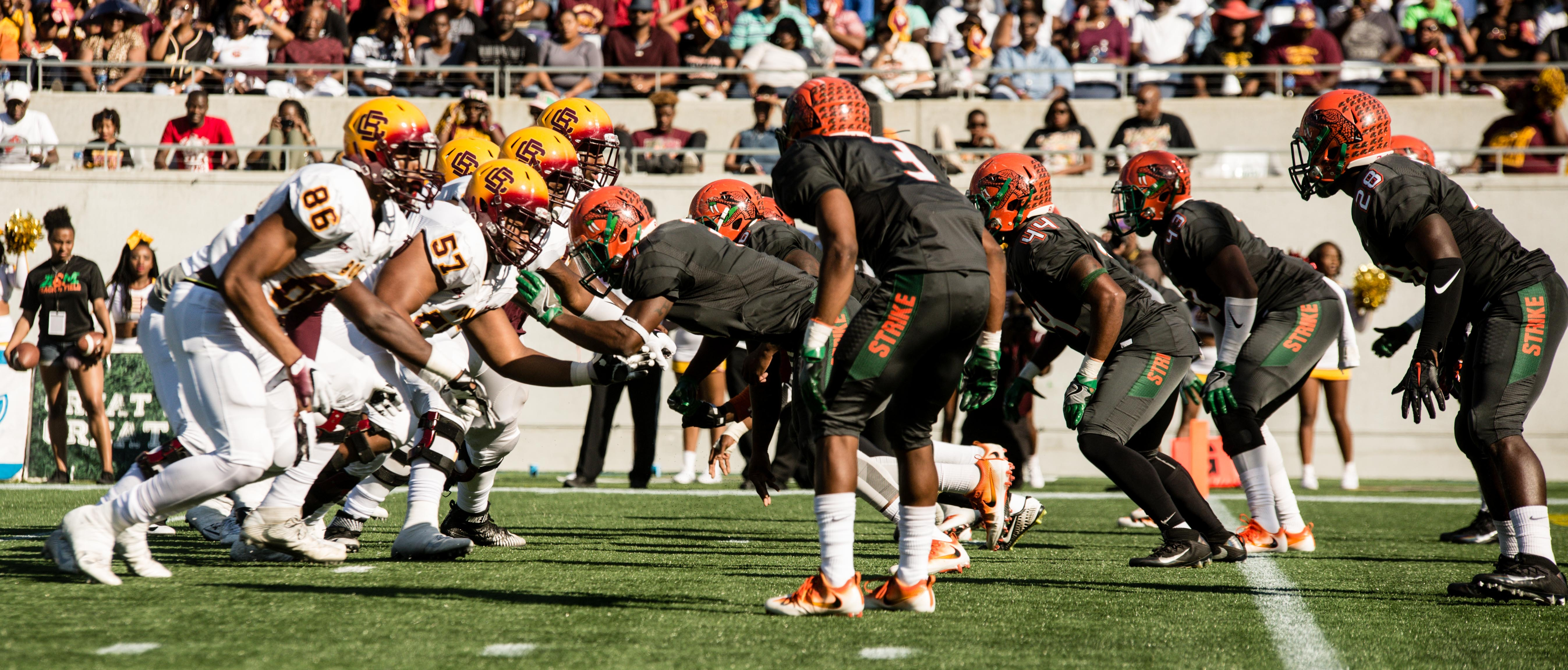
Bethune–Cookman (left) lines up on offense against Florida A&M during the 2016 Florida Classic.

In 2005, the game made its debut on ESPNU, the 24-hour college sports network, as a part of a commitment to broadcasting HBCU games.

== Game results ==
Bethune–Cookman victories	Florida A&M victories	Tie games

No.	Date	Location	Winner	Score
1	1925	Tallahassee, FL	Florida A&M	23–0
2	1926	Daytona Beach, FL	Bethune–Cookman	12–0
3	1927	Tallahassee, FL	Florida A&M	12–6
4	1929	Tallahassee, FL	Tie	6–6
5	1930	Daytona Beach, FL	Florida A&M	32–0
6	1931	Tallahassee, FL	Florida A&M	32–0
7	1932	Daytona Beach, FL	Florida A&M	25–0
8	1947	Tallahassee, FL	Florida A&M	6–0
9	1950	Daytona Beach, FL	Florida A&M	32–7
10	1951	Tallahassee, FL	Florida A&M	26–13
11	1952	Daytona Beach, FL	Bethune–Cookman	8–7
12	1953	Tallahassee, FL	Florida A&M	39–7
13	1955	Jacksonville, FL	Florida A&M	32–0
14	1956	Jacksonville, FL	Florida A&M	54–6
15	1957	Jacksonville, FL	Florida A&M	45–6
16	1958	Jacksonville, FL	Florida A&M	29–0
17	1959	Jacksonville, FL	Florida A&M	68–6
18	1960	Daytona Beach, FL	Florida A&M	97–0
19	1961	Tallahassee, FL	Florida A&M	76–0
20	1962	Daytona Beach, FL	Florida A&M	52–6
21	1963	Tallahassee, FL	Florida A&M	50–14
22	1964	Daytona Beach, FL	Florida A&M	31–14
23	1965	Tallahassee, FL	Florida A&M	47–8
24	1966	Daytona Beach, FL	Florida A&M	37–13
25	1967	Tallahassee, FL	Florida A&M	30–6
26	1968	Daytona Beach, FL	Florida A&M	23–20
27	1969	Tallahassee, FL	Florida A&M	60–15
28	1970	Daytona Beach, FL	Florida A&M	20–9
29	1971	Tallahassee, FL	Florida A&M	33–20
30	1972	Daytona Beach, FL	Florida A&M	28–18
31	1973	Tallahassee, FL	Bethune–Cookman	21–13
32	1974	Daytona Beach, FL (DIS)	Bethune–Cookman	6–0
33	1975	Tallahassee, FL	Florida A&M	17–7
34	1976	Orlando, FL	Bethune–Cookman	34–0
35	1977	Tallahassee, FL	Florida A&M	14–7
36	1978	Tampa, FL	Florida A&M	27–17
37	1979	Tampa, FL	Bethune–Cookman	25–20
38	1980	Tampa, FL	Bethune–Cookman	16–14
39	1981	Tampa, FL	Florida A&M	29–0
40	1982	Tampa, FL	Florida A&M	29–14
41	1985	Tampa, FL	Bethune–Cookman	31–27

No.	Date	Location	Winner	Score
42	1986	Tampa, FL	Florida A&M	16–6
43	1987	Tampa, FL	Florida A&M	21–10
44	1988	Tampa, FL	Bethune–Cookman	25–0
45	1989	Tampa, FL	Florida A&M	30–7
46	1990	Tampa, FL	Florida A&M	42–20
47	1991	Tampa, FL	Florida A&M	46–28
48	1992	Tampa, FL	Bethune–Cookman	35–21
49	1993	Tampa, FL	Florida A&M	27–22
50	1994	Tampa, FL	Bethune–Cookman	27–24
51	1995	Tampa, FL	Florida A&M	43–0
52	1996	Tampa, FL	Florida A&M	41–7
53	1997	Orlando, FL	Florida A&M	52–35
54	1998	Orlando, FL	Florida A&M	50–14
55	1999	Orlando, FL	Florida A&M	63–14
56	2000	Orlando, FL	Florida A&M	31–28
57	2001	Orlando, FL	Florida A&M	31–21
58	2002	Orlando, FL	Bethune–Cookman	37–10
59	2003	Orlando, FL	Bethune–Cookman	39–35
60	2004	Orlando, FL	Bethune–Cookman	58–52
61	2005	Orlando, FL	Florida A&M	26–23
62	2006	Orlando, FL	Florida A&M	35–21
63	2007	Orlando, FL	Bethune–Cookman	34–7
64	2008	Orlando, FL	Florida A&M	58–35
65	2009	Orlando, FL	Florida A&M	42–6
66	2010	Orlando, FL	Florida A&M	38–27
67	2011	Orlando, FL	Bethune–Cookman	26–16
68	2012	Orlando, FL	Bethune–Cookman	21–16
69	2013	Orlando, FL	Bethune–Cookman	29–10
70	2014	Orlando, FL	Bethune–Cookman	18–17
71	2015	Orlando, FL	Bethune–Cookman	35–14
72	2016	Orlando, FL	Bethune–Cookman	39–19
73	2017	Orlando, FL	Bethune–Cookman	29–24
74	2018	Orlando, FL	Bethune–Cookman	33–19
75	2019	Orlando, FL	Bethune–Cookman	31–27
76	2021	Orlando, FL	Florida A&M	46–21
77	2022	Orlando, FL	Florida A&M	41–20
78	2023	Orlando, FL	Florida A&M	24–7
79	2024	Orlando, FL	Florida A&M	41–38
80	2025	Orlando, FL	Bethune–Cookman	38–34
81	2026	Orlando, FL	Florida A&M	27–14
Series: Florida A&M leads 55–25–1

== Location ==
The game is held at Camping World Stadium in Orlando. Previous games were at the Daytona International Speedway in Daytona Beach and Doak Campbell Stadium in Tallahassee until the two schools agreed on a permanent site in Tampa in 1978.

== Annual attendance ==
The Florida Classic has now drawn in excess of 1.8 million fans since 1978. Since 1997, a total of 1,115,783 fans have watched the Florida Classic in the Orlando Citrus Bowl Stadium, an average of 61,988 per year. By comparison, the total attendance for the 18 years prior to Orlando was 765,529, an average of only 45,031. Between Orlando and Tampa, the Classic has drawn 1,801,587 fans. The record for attendance at the game is 73,358, set in Orlando in 2003.

== Other activities ==
=== Halftime Show and Battle of the Bands ===
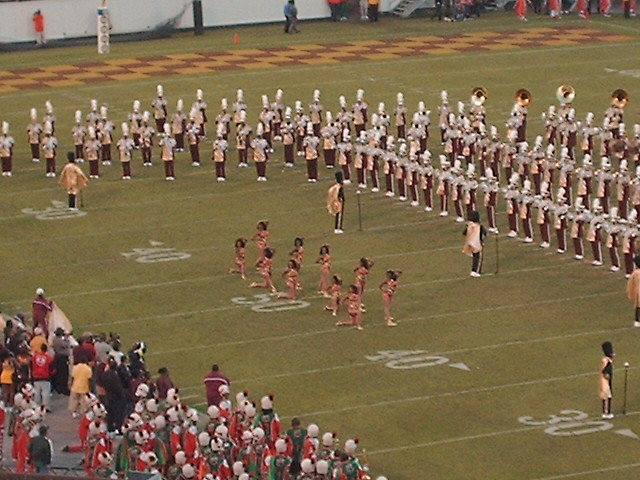
The 14 Karat Gold Dancers of the BCU Marching Wildcats during halftime at the Florida Classic.

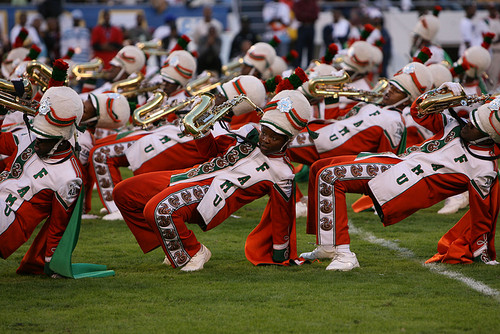
The FAMU Marching 100 during halftime at the Florida Classic.

Marching bands from both universities compete during the Florida Classic halftime show and at various events during the weekend.

In a 2006 article, Orlando Weekly Magazine said, "at most college football games, halftime is for beer runs and bathroom breaks. At the (Florida Classic), halftime is the reason to go."

Over the years fans have agreed with these types descriptions of the game's halftime show. They also point out that areas under the stadium clear out as fans go to their seats or stand on walkways located at the stadium's end zones because they provide unrestricted views of the football field and the halftime show.

Prior to the MEAC's contract with ESPN to broadcast the game, the two bands enjoyed almost unlimited time to perform their last, longest and undoubtedly best show of the year. In fact, in the 2002 Florida Classic halftime, both bands performed shows that were almost 45 minutes long, nearly tripling the halftime's allotment of only 30 minutes based on NCAA rules.

The rivalry between the two programs is also evident in phrases used by the bands' announcers. Although good friends, Horatio "In Stereo" Walker of Bethune–Cookman's Marching Wildcats and radio jockey Joe Bullard of FAMU's Marching "100," don't express any kind words for the opponent band as they narrate their marching band's respective shows.

The marching bands' appeal is also used to attract fans to other events during the Florida Classic weekend. On Fridays, both bands perform after high school bands during the annual Florida Blue Battle of the Bands at Kia Center. Prior to 2007 while Walt Disney World was still a sponsor, both bands performed annually at a parade at one of the Walt Disney World parks.

== See also ==
- List of NCAA college football rivalry games
- List of black college football classics
