= Orange Blossom Classic =

- Stadium: Hard Rock Stadium
- Location: Miami Gardens, Florida
- Previous stadiums: Several, including the Miami Orange Bowl and Tinker Field
- Previous locations: Miami, Jacksonville, Orlando, Tallahassee, Tampa
- Operated: 1933–1978; 2021–present

Sponsors
- Denny's (2021–2024; 2026–present); Invesco QQQ (2025)

2026 matchup
- Florida A&M vs. South Carolina State (South Carolina State 31–13)

2027 matchup
- TBD vs. TBD

The Orange Blossom Classic is an American annual college football game first held from 1933 to 1978 and again since 2021. Since 2021, the game has been played on Labor Day weekend.

== History ==
In its first incarnation, the Classic featured two historically black colleges and universities (HBCU)—Florida A&M and another program. The game sometimes served as a de facto championship game, depending on the record of the participating teams. The game was played late in the season, with Florida A&M inviting another top black team as its opponent. The game could be seen as a mythical "black national championship" game. For example, the December 5, 1942, Afro American newspaper refers to the 1942 game as a national title game, as does at least one source for the 1945 game. From 1952 to 1962, 10 of the 11 teams that won the Classic were named national champions. However, there were also numerous seasons in which neither Florida A&M nor its Classic opponent were selected as national champions.

The Classic was discontinued after its 1978 playing. The name was sometimes applied to subsequent regular-season meetings between Florida A&M and the FIU Panthers.

In its second incarnation, the Classic returned in 2021. That season, Florida A&M played Jackson State in a season opening game at Hard Rock Stadium in September. The game has continued as an annual early-season contest between those two programs. The 2022 matchup had the second most viewed HBCU football game with close to 958,000 viewers, trailing only the Celebration Bowl. In 2024 Florida A&M will no longer play in the game and the will find another team to play Jackson State. In 2024 the game had a weather delay for an hour and twenty minute delay because of lightning in the area.

== Game results ==
=== 1933–1978 ===
| Year | Site | Winner | | Loser | | Ref. | Attendance |
|---|---|---|---|---|---|---|---|
| 1933 | Jacksonville, Florida | Florida A&M | 9 | Howard | 6 | | 6,000 |
| 1934 | Jacksonville, Florida | Florida A&M | 13 | Virginia State | 12 | | |
| 1935 | Jacksonville, Florida | Kentucky State‡ | 19 | Florida A&M | 9 | | 5,000 |
| 1936 | Jacksonville, Florida | Prairie View A&M | 6 | Florida A&M | 0 | | 5,000 |
| 1937 | Orlando, Florida | Florida A&M | 25 | Hampton | 20 | | 3,000 |
| 1938 | Orlando, Florida | Florida A&M‡ | 9 | Kentucky State | 7 | | |
| 1939 | Orlando, Florida | Florida A&M | 42 | Wiley | 0 | | |
| 1940 | Orlando, Florida | Wilberforce 0–0 Florida A&M | | | | | 7,000 |
| 1941 | Orlando, Florida | Florida A&M | 15 | Tuskegee | 7 | | 8,200 |
| 1942 | Jacksonville, Florida | Florida A&M‡ | 12 | Texas College | 6 | | 3,000 |
| 1943 | Jacksonville, Florida | Hampton | 39 | Florida A&M | 0 | | 2,500 |
| 1944 | Tampa, Florida | Virginia State | 15 | Florida A&M | 7 | | 6,000 |
| 1945 | Tampa, Florida | Wiley‡ | 32 | Florida A&M | 6 | | 8,000 |
| 1946 | Tampa, Florida | #20 Lincoln (PA) | 20 | #8 Florida A&M | 0 | | 9,000 |
| 1947 | Miami, Florida | #3 Florida A&M | 7 | #4 Hampton | 0 | | 19,000 |
| 1948 | Miami, Florida | #10 Virginia Union | 10 | #5 Florida A&M | 6 | | 15,986 |
| 1949 | Miami, Florida | #6 North Carolina A&T | 20 | #5 Florida A&M | 14 | | 14,274 |
| 1950 | Miami, Florida | #12 Wilberforce State | 13 | #1 Florida A&M‡ | 6 | | 19,317 |
| 1951 | Miami, Florida | #2 Florida A&M | 67 | #7 North Carolina College | 6 | | 23,446 |
| 1952 | Miami, Florida | #1 Florida A&M‡ | 29 | #2 Virginia State | 7 | | 35,064 |
| 1953 | Miami, Florida | #1 Prairie View A&M‡ | 33 | #2 Florida A&M‡ | 27 | | 41,313 |
| 1954 | Miami, Florida | #2 Florida A&M‡ | 67 | #6 Maryland State (Note: The University of Maryland Eastern Shore was known as Maryland State College until 1970.) | 19 | | 41,179 |
| 1955 | Miami, Florida | #1 Grambling‡ | 28 | #3 Florida A&M | 21 | | 40,319 |
| 1956 | Miami, Florida | #1 Tennessee A&I‡ | 41 | #2 Florida A&M | 39 | | 41,808 |
| 1957 | Miami, Florida | #1 Florida A&M‡ | 27 | #4 Maryland State | 21 | | 37,000 |
| 1958 | Miami, Florida | #1 Prairie View A&M‡ | 26 | #3 Florida A&M | 8 | | 39,426 |
| 1959 | Miami, Florida | #1 Florida A&M‡ | 28 | #4 Prairie View A&M | 7 | | 43,645 |
| 1960 | Miami, Florida | #2 Florida A&M | 40 | Langston | 26 | | 42,080 |
| 1961 | Miami, Florida | #1 Florida A&M‡ | 14 | #2 Jackson State | 8 | | 47,791 |
| 1962 | Miami, Florida | #2 Jackson State‡ | 22 | #1 Florida A&M‡ | 6 | | 43,461 |
| 1963 | Miami, Florida | #4 Florida A&M | 30 | #3 Morgan State | 7 | | 31,769 |
| 1964 | Miami, Florida | #2 Florida A&M | 42 | #3 Grambling | 15 | | 28,127 |
| 1965 | Miami, Florida | #2 Morgan State | 36 | #3 Florida A&M | 7 | | 35,638 |
| 1966 | Miami, Florida | Florida A&M | 43 | Alabama A&M | 26 | | 28,815 |
| 1967 | Miami, Florida | #2 Grambling‡ | 28 | #4 Florida A&M | 25 | | 37,681 |
| 1968 | Miami, Florida | #3 Alcorn A&M‡ | 36 | #7 Florida A&M | 9 | | 37,390 |
| 1969 | Miami, Florida | #3 Florida A&M | 23 | #5 Grambling | 19 | | 36,680 |
| 1970 | Miami, Florida | Jacksonville State | 21 | Florida A&M | 7 | | 31,184 |
| 1971 | Miami, Florida | Florida A&M | 27 | Kentucky State | 9 | | 26,161 |
| 1972 | Miami, Florida | Florida A&M | 41 | Maryland Eastern Shore | 21 | | 23,840 |
| 1973 | Miami, Florida | Florida A&M | 23 | #11 South Carolina State | 12 | | 18,996 |
| 1974 | Miami, Florida | #20 Florida A&M | 17 | #6 Howard | 13 | | 20,167 |
| 1975 | Miami, Florida | #2 Florida A&M | 40 | #8 Kentucky State | 13 | | 27,875 |
| 1976 | Miami, Florida | #20 Florida A&M | 26 | #16 Central State | 21 | | 18,042 |
| 1977 | Miami, Florida | #1 Florida A&M‡ | 37 | #8 Delaware State | 15 | | 29,493 |
| 1978 | Miami, Florida | #1 Florida A&M‡ | 31 | #2 Grambling State | 7 | | 35,499 |

‡ Denotes a team selected as Black college football national champions for the season in question (in some seasons, different teams were named champions by different selectors).

Rankings from The Pittsburgh Courier (1946–1958, 1961–1969), Associated Negro Press (1959–1960), and Jet (1973–1978)

=== 2021–present ===
| Year | Site | Winner | | Loser | | Ref. | Attendance |
|---|---|---|---|---|---|---|---|
| 2021 | Miami Gardens, Florida | Jackson State | 7 | Florida A&M | 6 | | 31,000 |
| 2022 | Miami Gardens, Florida | #15 Jackson State | 59 | Florida A&M | 3 | | 39,907 |
| 2023 | Miami Gardens, Florida | Florida A&M‡ | 28 | Jackson State | 10 | | 24,967 |
| 2024 | Miami Gardens, Florida | North Carolina Central | 31 | Alabama State | 24 | | 10,256 |
| 2025 | Miami Gardens, Florida | Howard | 10 | Florida A&M | 9 | | 22,455 |
| 2026 | Miami Gardens, Florida | #21 South Carolina State | 31 | Florida A&M | 13 | | 23,188 |

== Appearances by team ==
| No. | School | Record |
|---|---|---|
| 50 | Florida A&M | 27–22–1 |
| 6 | Grambling State | 3–3 |
| 5 | Jackson State | 3–2 |
| 4 | Kentucky State | 1–3 |
| 4 | Prairie View A&M | 3–1 |
| 3 | Central State | 1–1–1 |
| 3 | Hampton | 1–2 |
| 3 | Maryland Eastern Shore | 0–3 |
| 3 | Virginia State | 1–2 |
| 2 | Howard | 1–2 |
| 2 | Morgan State | 1-1 |
| 2 | Wiley | 1–1 |
| 1 | Alabama A&M | 0–1 |
| 1 | Alcorn State | 1–0 |
| 1 | Delaware State | 0–1 |
| 1 | Jacksonville State | 1–0 |
| 1 | Langston | 0–1 |
| 1 | North Carolina A&T | 1–0 |
| 1 | North Carolina Central | 0–1 |
| 2 | South Carolina State | 1–1 |
| 1 | Tennessee State | 1–0 |
| 1 | Texas College | 0–1 |
| 1 | Tuskegee | 0–1 |
| 1 | Virginia Union | 1–0 |
| 1 | Alabama State | 0–1 |

== See also ==
- List of black college football classics
