= Abbott Memorial Alumni Stadium =

Stadium in Tuskegee, Alabama

- Interactive map of Abbott Memorial Alumni Stadium
- Full name: Cleveland Leigh Abbott Memorial Alumni Stadium
- Location: Tuskegee, Alabama
- Coordinates: 32°25′29.50″N 85°42′19.19″W
- Capacity: 10,000

Construction
- Opened: 1925

Tenant
- Tuskegee University

Cleveland Leigh Abbott Memorial Alumni Stadium, originally known as the Alumni Bowl, is a stadium in Tuskegee, Alabama. It is primarily used for American football, and is the home field of the Tuskegee University Golden Tigers. The stadium holds 10,000 spectators and opened in 1925. It is named after former Tuskegee Tigers head football coach, Cleveland L. Abbott. When it opened, it was the first stadium opened on a historically black school's campus.

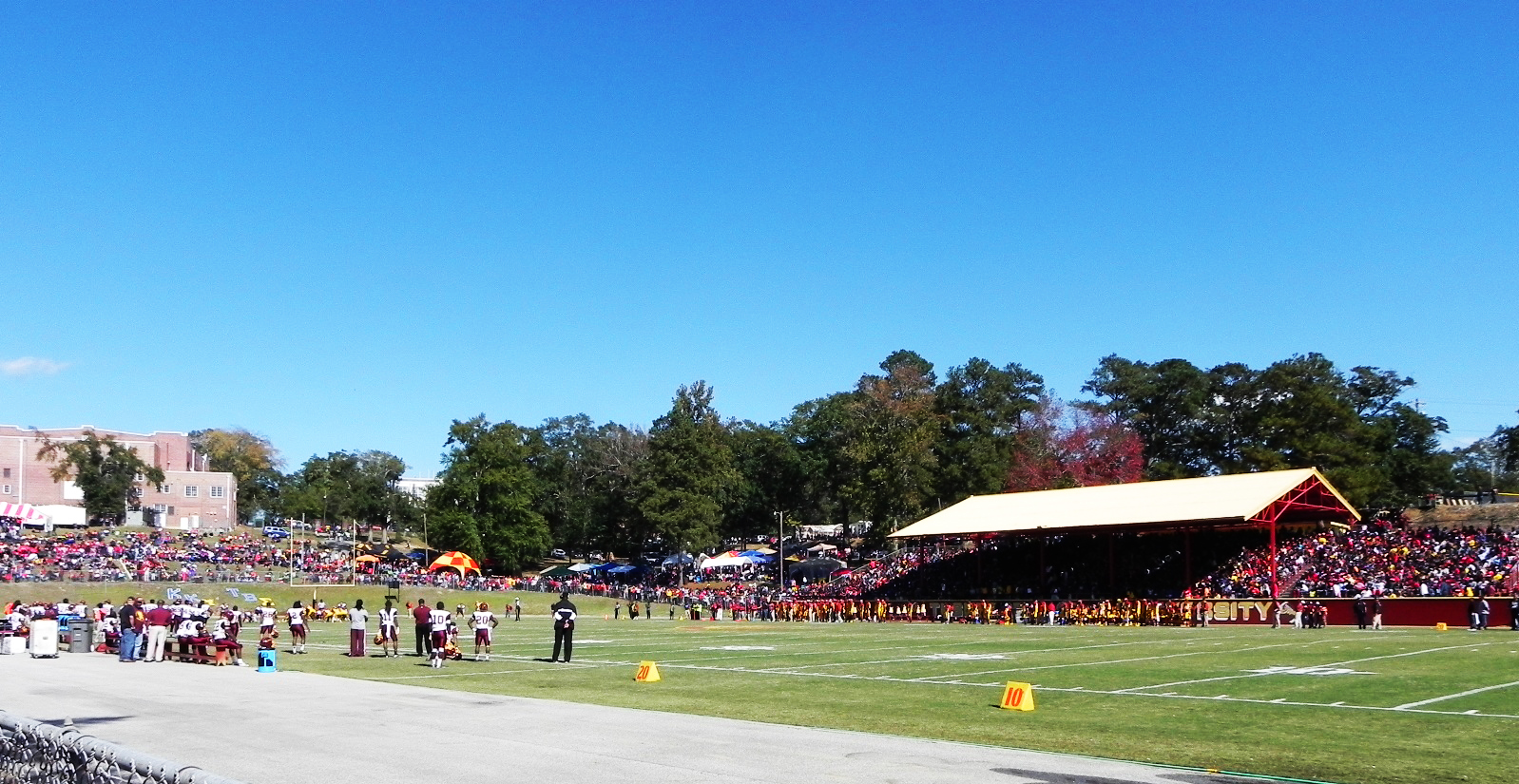
Tuskegee University's historic Cleveland Leigh Abbott Memorial Alumni

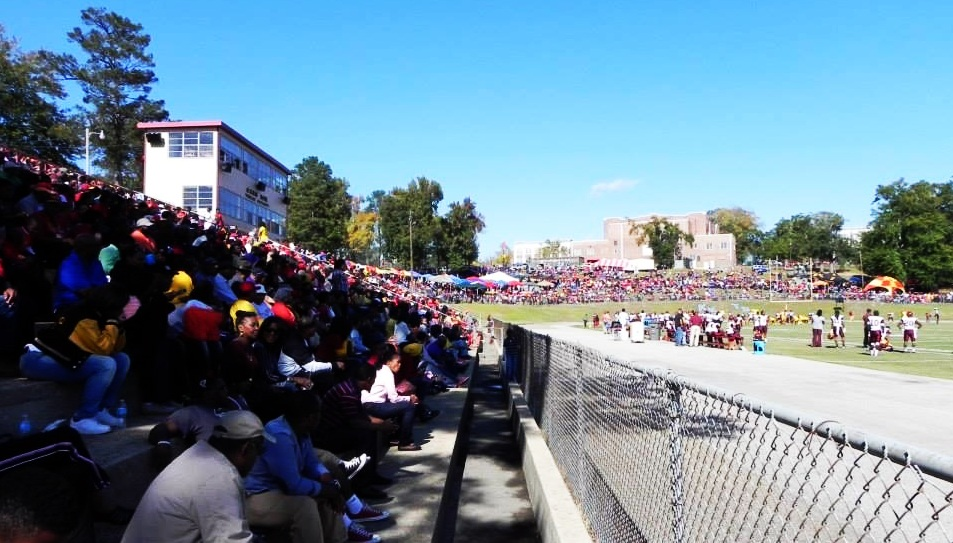
Abbott Memorial Alumni Stadium

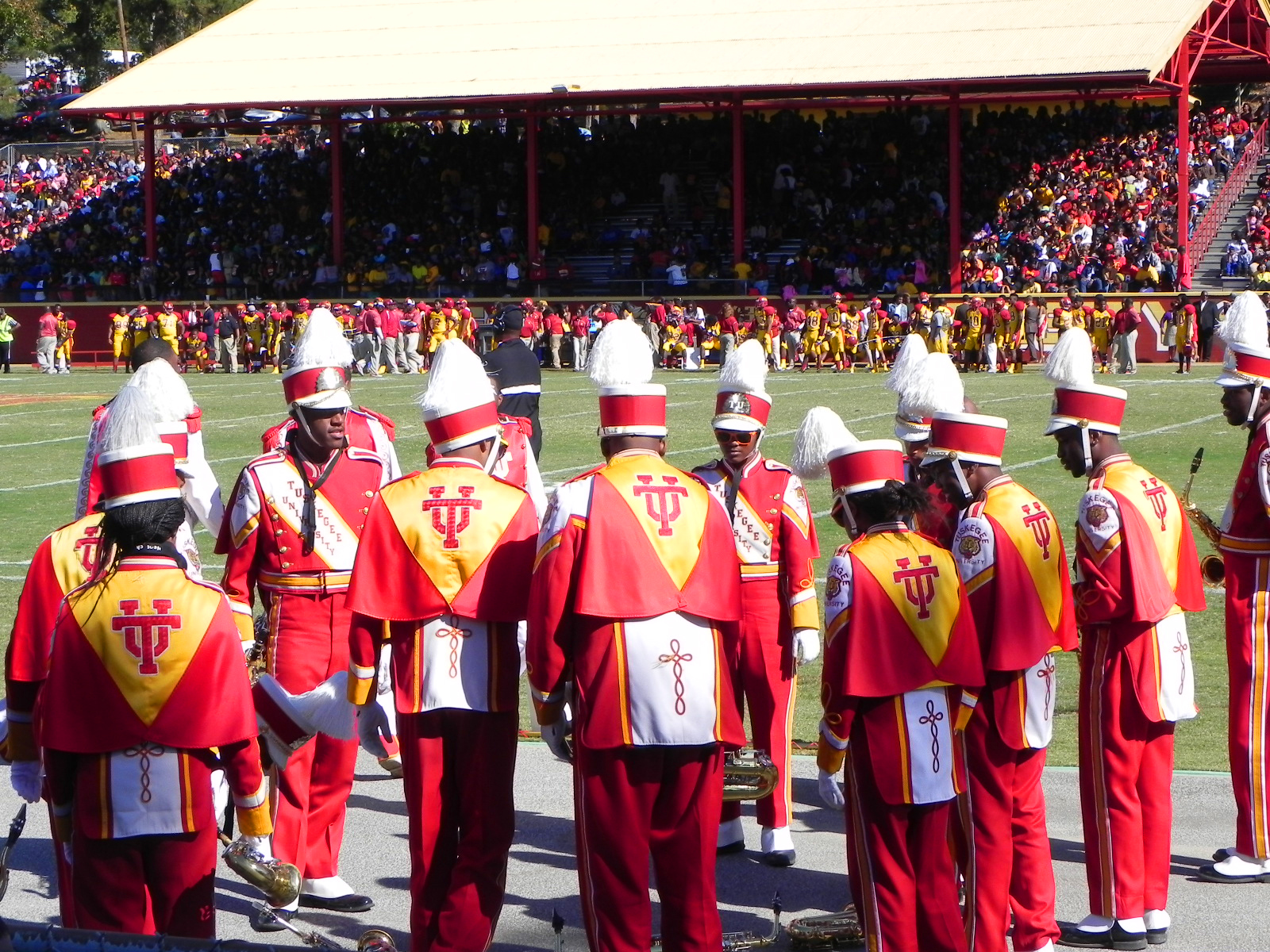
Tuskegee University's historic Cleveland Leigh Abbott Memorial Alumni Stadium
