= Florida A&M Rattlers football =

Represents Florida A&M University in the sport of American football

2026 Florida A&M Rattlers football team
- First season: 1907; 119 years ago
- Head coach: Quinn Gray; 1st season, 2–6 (.250)
- Location: Tallahassee, Florida
- Stadium: Bragg Memorial Stadium (capacity: 19,633)
- NCAA division: Division I FCS
- Conference: SWAC
- Colors: Green and orange
- All-time record: 606–352–22 (.630)
- Bowl record: 29–24–2 (.545)

NCAA Division I FCS championships
- 1978

Black college national championships
- 1938, 1942, 1950, 1952, 1953, 1954, 1957, 1959, 1961, 1962, 1977, 1978, 1998, 2001, 2019, 2023

Conference championships
- SIAC: 1937, 1938, 1942, 1943, 1945, 1946, 1947, 1948, 1949, 1950, 1953, 1954, 1955, 1956, 1957, 1958, 1959, 1960, 1961, 1962, 1963, 1964, 1942, 1967, 1968, 1969, 1977, 1978) MEAC: 1988, 1990, 1995, 1996, 1998, 2000, 2001, 2010 SWAC: 2023

Division championships
- SWAC East: 2023
- Rivalries: Bethune–Cookman (rivalry)
- Marching band: Marching 100
- Website: FAMUAthletics.com

The Florida A&M Rattlers football team represents Florida A&M University in the sport of American football. The Rattlers compete in the Football Championship Subdivision (FCS) of Division I of the National Collegiate Athletic Association (NCAA). Starting with the fall 2021 season, the Rattlers will compete in the East Division of the Southwestern Athletic Conference (SWAC), after a long tenure in the Mid-Eastern Athletic Conference (MEAC). They play their home games at Bragg Memorial Stadium in Tallahassee.

The Rattlers have won 17 black college football national championship, 29 Southern Intercollegiate Athletic Conference (SIAC) titles, eight MEAC titles, one SWAC title and one I-AA national title in the history of their football program. During the 2004 season, the Rattlers briefly attempted to move up to Division I-A (now known as the FBS) and become the only HBCU at college football's highest level, but the team was forced to abort its bid.

== History ==
=== Classifications ===
- 1952–1972: NCAA College Division
- 1973–1977: NCAA Division II
- 1978–2003: NCAA Division I–AA
- 2004: NCAA Division I–A
- 2005–present: NCAA Division I–AA/FCS

=== Conference memberships ===
- 1907–1925: Independent
- 1926–1978: Southern Intercollegiate Athletic Conference (SIAC)†
- 1979–1983: Mid-Eastern Athletic Conference (MEAC)
- 1984–1985: NCAA Division I-AA independent
- 1986–2003: Mid-Eastern Athletic Conference
- 2004: NCAA Division I-A independent
- 2005–2020: Mid-Eastern Athletic Conference
- 2021–present: Southwestern Athletic Conference

† In 1978, FAMU was a member of SIAC, an NCAA Division II conference. FAMU had successfully petitioned the NCAA for Division I classification (Division I-AA in football), which took effect on September 1, 1978.

The Rattlers have been part of a couple controversies in recent years. In 2022, FAMU almost had to forfeit a week 1 game against North Carolina because 20 players were academically ineligible to play. In July 2023, Florida A&M halted all football related activities after a rap video containing explicit lyrics was filmed in their locker room.

== Annual Classics ==
- Florida Classic
- Orange Blossom Classic

== Championships ==
=== National, Black College ===
The Rattlers claim 16 historically black colleges and universities (HBCUs) championships 15 come from official HBCU championship selectors, while the 2021 claim is the result of an NCAA power ranking of FCS HBCU teams.

=== National ===
Year	Championship	Coach	Overall record	Conference
1938	Black College National Champions	William M. Bell	8–0	SIAC
1942	Black College National Champions	William M. Bell	9–0	SIAC
1950	Black College National co-champions	Jake Gaither	8–1–1	SIAC
1952	Black College National Champions	Jake Gaither	8–2	SIAC
1953	Black College National co-champions	Jake Gaither	10–1	SIAC
1954	Black College National co-champions	Jake Gaither	8–1	SIAC
1957	Black College National Champions	Jake Gaither	9–0	SIAC
1959	Black College National Champions	Jake Gaither	10–0	SIAC
1961	Black College National Champions	Jake Gaither	10–0	SIAC
1962	Black College National co-champions	Jake Gaither	9–1	SIAC
1977	Black College National Champions	Rudy Hubbard	11–0	SIAC
1978	Black College National Champions	Rudy Hubbard	12–1	SIAC
1998	Black College National co-champions	Billy Joe	11–2	MEAC
2001	Black College National co-champions	Billy Joe	7–4	MEAC
2019	Black College National co-champions	Willie Simmons	9–2	MEAC
2023	Black College National Champions	Willie Simmons	12–1	SWAC

=== National, Division I–AA/FCS ===
Florida A&M has one championship in the division formerly known as Division I-AA. They are the only HBCU to play in and win a I-AA/FCS championship game.

Year	Association	Division	Coach	Selector	Record	Opponent	Score
1978	NCAA	Division I–AA	Rudy Hubbard	Playoffs	12–1	Massachusetts	35–28

=== National, Division II/College Division ===
One Florida A&M team has been awarded a national championship from NCAA-designated designated major selector, as they were declared Associated Press (AP) small college national champion for the 1962 season. While the school holds the distinction of being the first HBCU to win an NCAA football title, the championship is not claimed by the university.

Year	Association	Division	Coach	Selector	Record
1962	NCAA	College Division	Jake Gaither	Poll	9–1

=== Conference championships ===
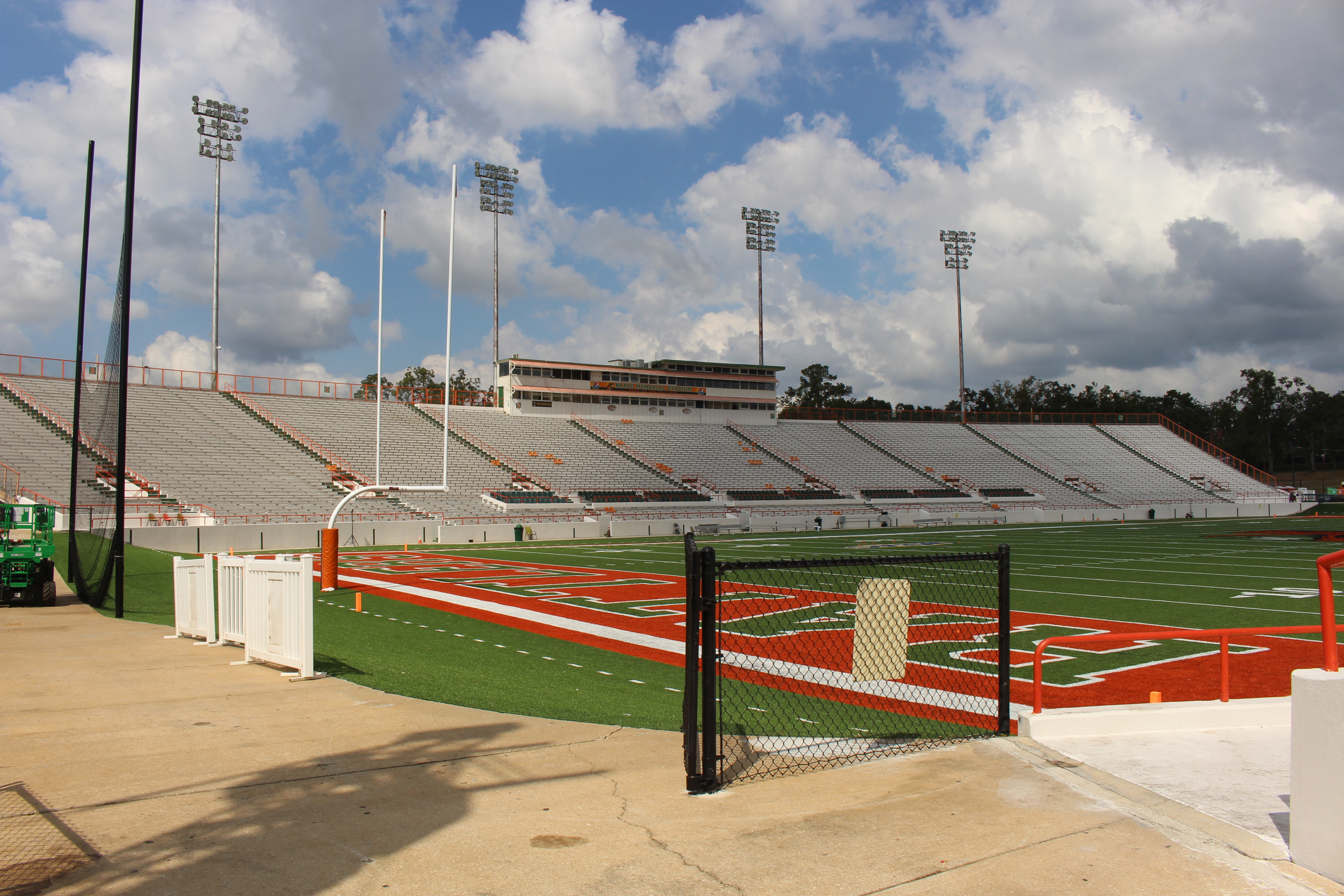
Bragg Memorial Stadium

Florida A&M has won 38 conference championships, 31 outright and 7 shared.

Year	Coach	Conference	Record
1937	William M. Bell	Southern Intercollegiate Athletic Conference	7–1–1
1938	William M. Bell	Southern Intercollegiate Athletic Conference	8–0
1942	William M. Bell	Southern Intercollegiate Athletic Conference	9–0
1943	Herman Neilson	Southern Intercollegiate Athletic Conference	7–3
1945	Jake Gaither	Southern Intercollegiate Athletic Conference	9–1
1946	Jake Gaither	Southern Intercollegiate Athletic Conference	6–4–1
1947	Jake Gaither	Southern Intercollegiate Athletic Conference	9–1
1948	Jake Gaither	Southern Intercollegiate Athletic Conference	8–2
1949	Jake Gaither	Southern Intercollegiate Athletic Conference	7–2
1950†	Jake Gaither	Southern Intercollegiate Athletic Conference	8–1
1953	Jake Gaither	Southern Intercollegiate Athletic Conference	10–1
1954	Jake Gaither	Southern Intercollegiate Athletic Conference	8–1
1955	Jake Gaither	Southern Intercollegiate Athletic Conference	7–1–1
1956	Jake Gaither	Southern Intercollegiate Athletic Conference	8–1
1957	Jake Gaither	Southern Intercollegiate Athletic Conference	9–0
1958	Jake Gaither	Southern Intercollegiate Athletic Conference	7–2
1959	Jake Gaither	Southern Intercollegiate Athletic Conference	10–0
1960	Jake Gaither	Southern Intercollegiate Athletic Conference	9–1
1961	Jake Gaither	Southern Intercollegiate Athletic Conference	10–0
1962†	Jake Gaither	Southern Intercollegiate Athletic Conference	9–1
1963†	Jake Gaither	Southern Intercollegiate Athletic Conference	8–2
1964	Jake Gaither	Southern Intercollegiate Athletic Conference	9–1
1965	Jake Gaither	Southern Intercollegiate Athletic Conference	7–3
1967	Jake Gaither	Southern Intercollegiate Athletic Conference	8–2
1968	Jake Gaither	Southern Intercollegiate Athletic Conference	8–2
1969	Jake Gaither	Southern Intercollegiate Athletic Conference	8–1
1977	Rudy Hubbard	Southern Intercollegiate Athletic Conference	11–0
1978	Rudy Hubbard	Southern Intercollegiate Athletic Conference	12–1
1988†	Ken Riley	Mid-Eastern Athletic Conference	6–4–1
1990	Ken Riley	Mid-Eastern Athletic Conference	7–4
1995	Billy Joe	Mid-Eastern Athletic Conference	9–3
1996	Billy Joe	Mid-Eastern Athletic Conference	9–3
1998†	Billy Joe	Mid-Eastern Athletic Conference	11–2
2000	Billy Joe	Mid-Eastern Athletic Conference	9–2
2001	Billy Joe	Mid-Eastern Athletic Conference	7–3
2010†	Joe Taylor	Mid-Eastern Athletic Conference	8–3
2023	Willie Simmons	Southwestern Athletic Conference	11–1

† Co-champions

=== Bowl games ===
This is a partial list. The Rattlers have an overall bowl record of 29–24–2.

Year	Bowl	Location	Opponent	Result
1938	Prairie View Bowl	Houston, Texas	Prairie View	L 27–14
1946	Angel Bowl	Los Angeles, California	Wiley	T 6–6
1992	Heritage Bowl	Tallahassee, Florida	Grambling State	L 45–15
1995	Heritage Bowl	Atlanta, Georgia	Southern	L 30–25
2023	Celebration Bowl	Atlanta, Georgia	Howard	W 30–26

== NCAA Division I-AA/FCS playoff results ==
The Rattlers have appeared in the I-AA/FCS playoffs eight times with a record of 5–7. They were I-AA National Champions in 1978, the first year of Division I-AA.

Year	Round	Opponent	Result
1978	Semifinals; National Championship Game	Jackson State; UMass	W 15–10; W 35–28
1996	First Round	Troy State	L 25–29
1997	First Round	Georgia Southern	L 37–52
1998	First Round; Quarterfinals	Troy State; Western Illinois	W 27–17; L 21–24
1999	First Round; Quarterfinals; Semifinals	Appalachian State; Troy State; Youngstown State	W 44–29; W 17–10; L 24–27
2000	First Round	Western Kentucky	L 0–27
2001	First Round	Georgia Southern	L 35–60
2021	First Round	Southeastern Louisiana	L 14–38

== College Football Hall of Fame members ==
- Jake Gaither
- Willie Galimore
- Billy Joe
- Tyrone McGriff

== Alumni in the NFL ==
Over 60 Florida A&M alumni have played in the NFL, including:

- Ray Alexander
- Gene Atkins
- Greg Coleman
- Al Denson
- Hewritt Dixon
- Glen Edwards
- Chad Fann
- Roger Finnie
- Derrick Gainer
- Willie Galimore
- Hubert Ginn
- Charles Goodrum
- Quinn Gray
- Bob Hayes
- Earl Holmes
- Henry Lawrence
- Herm Lee
- Frank Marion
- Willie McClung
- Terry Mickens
- Riley Morris
- Jamie Nails
- Nate Newton
- Carleton Oats
- Ken Riley
- Vernice Smith
- Wally Williams
- Robert Wilson
- Kevin Elliott
- Markquese Bell
- Xavier Smith
- Isaiah Land
- Terrell Jennings

== Future non-conference opponents ==
Announced schedules as of August 11, 2026

2026	2027	2028	2029	2030	2031
Albany State	at USF				at South Carolina State
vs South Carolina State; Miami Gardens, FL	at Tennessee State				
at Miami (FL)	at NC Central				
Tennessee State					

== See also ==
- American football in the United States
