= Fort Valley State Wildcats =

- University: Fort Valley State University
- Nickname: Wildcats
- NCAA: Division II
- Conference: SIAC (primary)
- Athletic director: Dr. Renae Myles Payne
- Location: Fort Valley, Georgia
- Varsity teams: 13 (6 men's, 6 women's, 1 co-ed)
- Football stadium: Wildcat Stadium
- Basketball arena: HPE Basketball Arena
- Softball stadium: Lady Wildcats Softball Field
- Tennis venue: Wildcat Tennis Courts
- Colors: Royal blue and old gold
- Website: fvsusports.com

The Fort Valley State Wildcats are the athletic teams that represent Fort Valley State University, located in Fort Valley, Georgia, in NCAA Division II intercollegiate sports. The Wildcats are full members of the Southern Intercollegiate Athletic Conference, where all 12 of its athletic programs compete. Fort Valley has been a member of the SIAC since 1941.

== Varsity teams ==
=== List of teams ===
Men's sports (6)

- Basketball
- Cross Country
- Football
- Tennis
- Track and field
- Volleyball

Women's sports (6)

- Basketball
- Cross country
- Softball
- Tennis
- Track and field
- Volleyball

== Individual teams ==
=== Football ===
In 1969, the Fort Valley State football team set the modern-era record for most points scored against a college opponent, with 106 points against Knoxville College (October 11, 2011). 11 Wildcats have played in the NFL. In 1995 Tyrone Poole became the first football player from Fort Valley State University to be selected in the first round of the NFL draft. In 2006 alumnus Rayfield Wright was selected to the Pro Football Hall of Fame.

Former Oakland Raiders punter Marquette King attended Fort Valley State University. Current NFL player Emmanuel Wilson attended Fort Valley State University.
