= Bragg Memorial Stadium =

Football stadium in Tallahassee, Florida

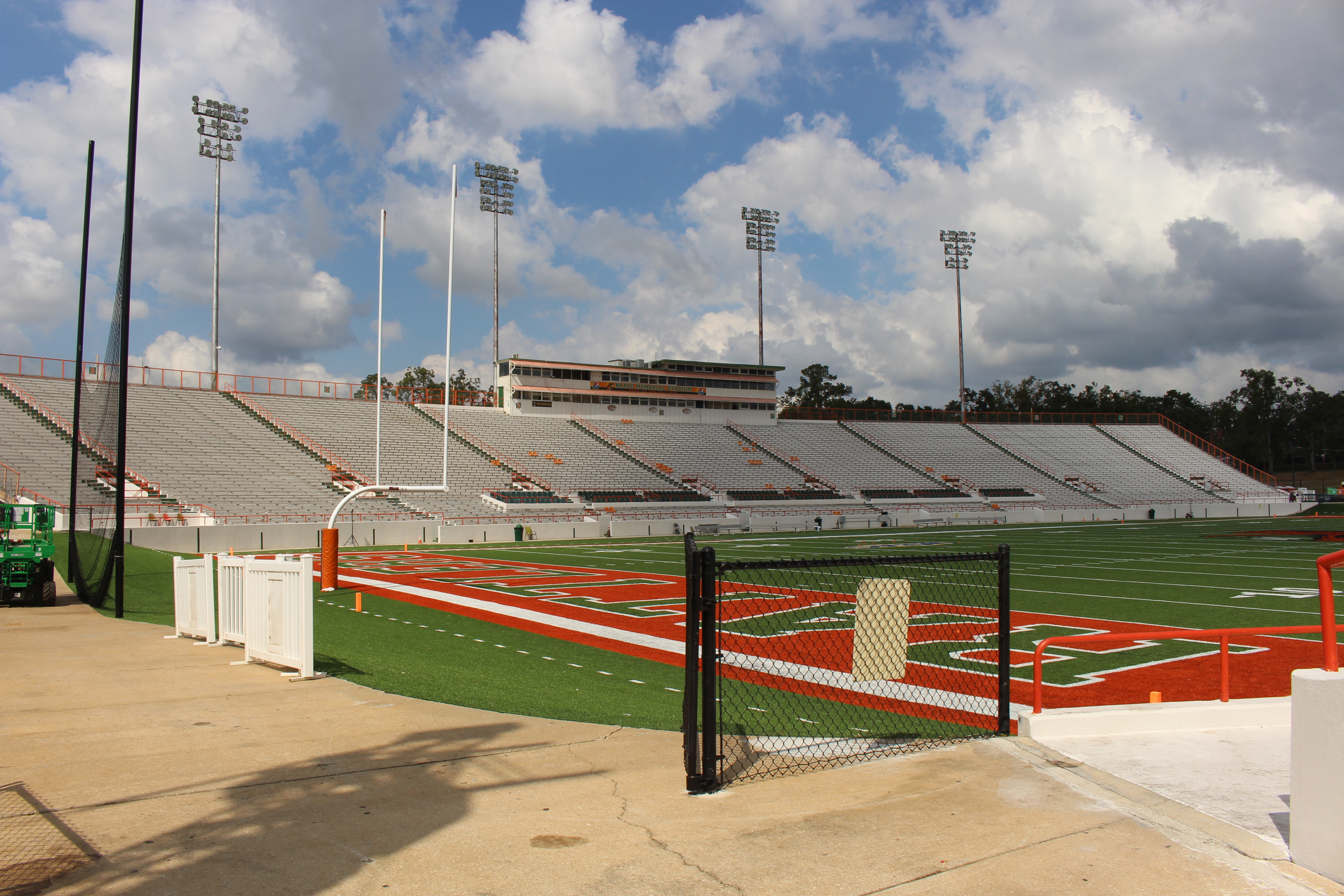
- Looking North West
- Interactive map of Bragg Memorial Stadium
- Full name: Ken Riley Field at Bragg Memorial Stadium
- Location: 1500 Wahnish Way; Tallahassee, Florida 32310
- Coordinates: 30°25′34″N 84°17′30″W
- Owner: Florida A&M University
- Operator: Florida A&M University
- Capacity: 25,500
- Surface: AstroTurf RootZone 3D3
- Record attendance: 33,954 (1996)

Construction
- Opened: 1957
- Renovated: 2022
- Cost: $4 million (renovations)

Tenant
- Florida A&M Rattlers (NCAA) (1957–present)

Ken Riley Field at Bragg Memorial Stadium is a 25,500-seat football stadium in Tallahassee, Florida, United States. It opened in 1957 and was renovated in 1982. It is home to the Florida A&M Rattlers football team.

== History ==
Built in 1957, Bragg Memorial Stadium is home to Florida A&M Football. The stadium is named in memory of two of the school's earliest figures in its storied intercollegiate athletic program—the "First Family of Rattler Football"—the father and son combination of Jubie and Eugene Bragg.

Jubie Bragg was one of the school's first athletic directors, being one of the key figures in the football program gaining varsity status in 1906. He returned after a brief stint at Tuskegee to become the school's first head football coach and athletic director at FAMU from 1923 to 1925 and again from 1930 to 1932.

Bragg's son, Eugene, one of the school's first All-America gridders (1927), took over the reins of the program in 1934, coaching through 1935, when an automobile accident ended his life.

The original Bragg Stadium opened in 1947 and served as the home of Rattlers football from 1947 to 1956. Prior to 1947, Florida A&M's home football field was known as Sampson-Bragg Field. The original football field was located on a cow pasture south of the campus and then on a grass field, located on a hill directly behind the current Gaither Gymnasium, where the present track and field complex is located.

The field was moved to that location, so that fans could use the bathroom facilities in the nearby dormitories. At the previous location in the cow pasture, it was a walk of a quarter mile to the nearest restroom. However, thanks to appropriations from the Florida Legislature, the all-steel stadium on the campus' westernmost edge was built in 1957. That configuration featured 10,500 permanent seats and bleachers elevated the capacity to 13,200.

But by the 1980s, the stadium had fallen into disrepair and had grown too small for the Rattler football program. The 1980 season saw the stadium condemned by the State of Florida engineers, prompting the Legislature (thanks to heavy lobbying by the FAMU Administration) to appropriate over four and a half million dollars for the stadium's renovation and expansion to begin 1981 with remodeling, to make the stadium suitable for crowds again. The Rattlers played at Doak Campbell Stadium, two miles north of the Florida A&M campus, for selected games in 1979 and the entire 1980 season.

To date, the largest single game attendance at Bragg Memorial Stadium was set in 1996 when 33,954 people were in attendance for the Homecoming football game against the Bears of Morgan State University.

=== Renovations ===
By 1982, the renovation and expansion had made the stadium a 25,500-seat facility with press box elevator, a $125,000 scoreboard with message center, a built-in sprinkler and drainage system, improved restroom, concessions and ticket booths and paved parking areas.

The project was completed in 1983, with the unveiling of the Galimore-Powell Fieldhouse, located adjacent to the stadium's south end zone.

On March 31, 2017, the Florida A&M Athletics released information about an upcoming proposed renovation to Bragg Memorial Stadium. Upgrades would include, but may not be limited to: new coaches offices, meeting rooms, classrooms and a team meeting room totaling nearly 10,000 square feet (930 m^{2}). Additionally, renovations would fix certain structural issues that the stadium currently has, including repairing damaged columns in the stadium, as well as repairs to the stairs going into the stands. The proposed upgrades would also include an increase in seating from its current capacity at 25,500, to an improved 35,000, as well as the installation of 25 luxury suites and improvements to the fan experience, which could include better concession stands, retail sales areas and the inclusion of restaurants. No formal date has been set for construction to start on the facility; however, FAMU Athletics officials have stated funding for the improvements will be entirely from fundraising efforts.

On June 26, 2018, Florida A&M Athletics announced the installation of AstroTurf to the Stadium. It's set to be in place by the beginning of the 2018 season.

The Jake Gaither Stadium Plan

In January 2018 the university released plans to relocate its football stadium to the south side of the campus and renaming it Jake Gaither Stadium. The Jake Gaither Stadium will open to the rest of the new south campus. This new, state-of-the-art establishment will be half dug into the sloping terrain, with a series of terraces accenting the building, allowing for crowds to enter from the campus. During a game, fans have full 360-degree access to the concourse. Rising from the field in three tiers, this 35,000 seat stadium pulls fans as close to the field as possible while keeping optimal sight lines. The stadium will remain flexible for other sports such as soccer and lacrosse while featuring 20 Leasable Luxury Suites, 4 Non-leasable University-Utilized Luxury Suites, 16 Lounge Boxes, 1,076 Premium Club Seats and 3,000 Priority Seats.

== Features ==
The structure contains coaches' offices, conference room, equipment and training/treatment rooms (with X-ray machines), two locker rooms, one for each team, home and visiting, plus an official's locker room and a weight training room.

== See also ==
- List of NCAA Division I FCS football stadiums
