= Clark Atlanta Panthers =

- University: Clark Atlanta University
- Conference: SIAC (primary)
- NCAA: Division II
- Athletic director: Dr. Jerel Drew
- Location: Atlanta, Georgia
- Varsity teams: 10 (4 men's, 6 women's)
- Football stadium: CAU Panther Stadium
- Basketball arena: L.S. Epps Gymnasium
- Baseball stadium: Gresham Park
- Softball stadium: Lady Panthers Softball Field
- Tennis venue: Clark Atlanta Tennis Center
- Nickname: Panthers
- Colors: Red, black, and gray
- Website: clarkatlantasports.com
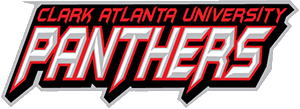

The Clark Atlanta Panthers are the athletic teams that represent Clark Atlanta University, located in Atlanta, Georgia, in NCAA Division II intercollegiate sports. The Panthers compete as members of the Southern Intercollegiate Athletic Conference for all ten varsity sports.

== Varsity teams ==
=== List of teams ===
Men's sports

- Baseball
- Basketball
- Cross country
- Football

Women's sports

- Basketball
- Cross country
- Softball
- Tennis
- Track and field
- Volleyball
