= Black college football national championship =

National championship won by the best football team among HBCUs in the United States

- Sport: American football
- Founded: 1920; 106 years ago
- No. of teams: 43
- Country: United States
- Most recent champion: South Carolina State (2025)
- Most titles: Florida A&M (16 titles)

The Black college football national championship, also named the HBCU football championship, is a national championship since 1920, and it has been regularly bestowed upon the best college football teams among historically Black colleges and universities (HBCUs) within the United States. The 2025 HBCU football champions are the South Carolina State Bulldogs.

== History ==
=== Background ===
In college football's early years, HBCUs generally lacked the opportunity to compete against predominantly white schools due to segregation, which was practiced in much of the U.S. at the time—leaving HBCUs with few scheduling options other than to play games among themselves only and sponsor their own championships.

The first football game between HBCU schools was played on December 27, 1892. On that day Johnson C. Smith defeated Livingstone College. As it was the only game played by HBCU schools that year, Johnson C. Smith's team could no doubt claim to be that season's HBCU national champions by default. However, the earliest documented claim to such a title was Livingstone's 1906 team, led by captain Benjamin Butler "Ben" Church. It is not immediately clear who exactly determined that Livingstone was the best team—or if they simply declared themselves champions.

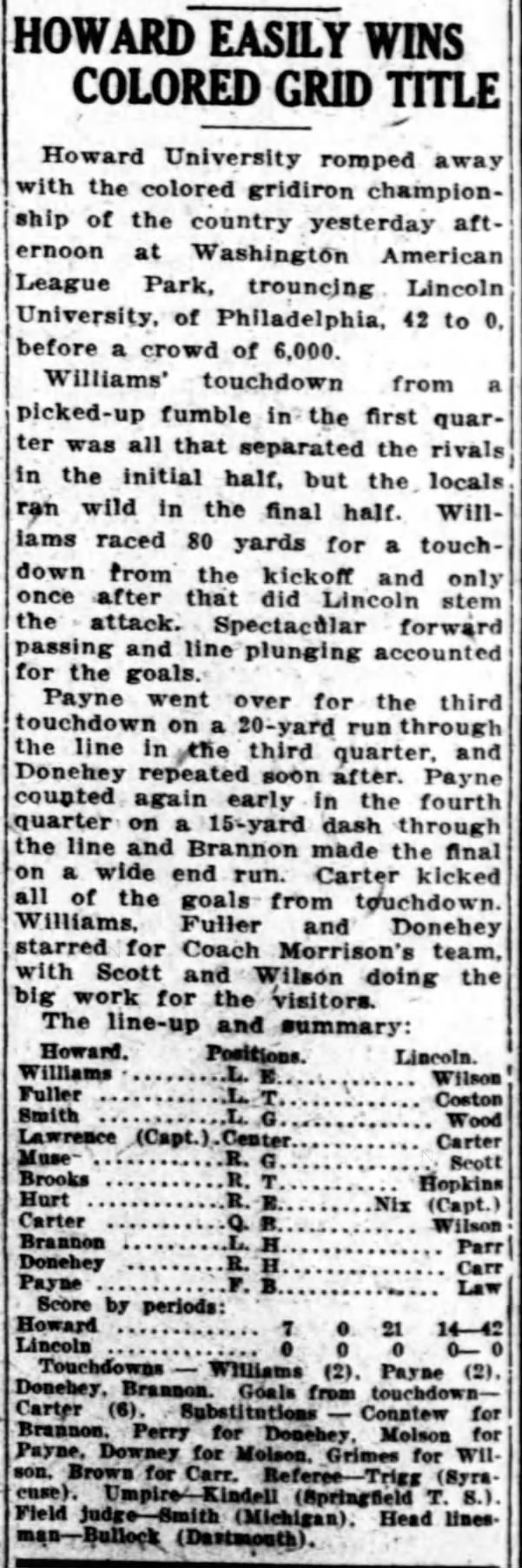
Report of a college football victory by Howard appearing in The Washington Herald in November 1920

=== Press rankings ===
Starting in 1920, HBCU national champions were designated by the Pittsburgh Courier at the end of the season. The champions were credited to compilations generated by Courier managing editor William Goldwyn "Bill" Nunn, Jr., Courier sports writer Eric "Ric" Roberts, and Grambling State sports information director Collie "Nick" Nicholson Other African American newspapers selecting national champions included the Baltimore Afro-American (1947-1953) and Atlanta Daily World (1953-2010). Other prominent media outlets that selected HBCU national champions included Jet magazine (1973–1992), the Associated Negro Press (1948–1960), and radio networks Mutual Black Network (1972–1990), National Black Network (1975-1978) and American Urban Radio Networks (1991–2016).

The Courier was also known to tabulate weekly HBCU rankings in later decades—first by borrowing the Dickinson System, from 1941 to 1950, before abandoning it due to controversy and replacing it with the newspaper's own "Courier Double-rating System" from 1951 onward, into the 1970s.

In 1921, others more directly associated with the schools themselves made their own attempts to crown a champion, coordinating their efforts under the auspices of the Champion Aggregation of All Conferences (CAAC). The CAAC's initiative was fostered by Paul Jones, who reported the champion annually in his column in Spalding's Intercollegiate Football Guide.

In the 1950s, HBCUs began to gravitate over to the National Association of Intercollegiate Athletics (NAIA) because it offered numerous athletic competition options, was oriented primarily toward smaller institutions, and had also begun openly welcoming schools of varying demographic backgrounds as members. The Central State Marauders won several press-selected national championships as members of the NAIA in the 1980s and 1990s.

At present, most HBCUs are now members of the National Collegiate Athletic Association (NCAA). However, designating an annual black national champion has remained a popular tradition, even as HBCUs have successfully challenged majority white schools for football championships for decades now, within the framework of both NCAA and NAIA competition; this includes Associated Press, United Press International, NCAA, and NAIA-sponsored titles for the 1962, 1973, 1978, 1990, 1992, and 1995 seasons, as well as runner-up finishes in 1963, 1983, 1991, 1994, and 2012.

=== Bowl games ===
The first prominent game between an HBCU and predominantly white institution occurred in the 1948 Fruit Bowl when Southern defeated San Francisco State, 30–0.

Attempts have been made over the years to determine a non-mythical national champion with an actual football game contested by leading teams among HBCUs throughout the United States. The Orange Blossom Classic was often billed as such a game, but Florida A&M, as its annual host, was guaranteed a spot in this game and was not necessarily national championship-caliber each and every year that it was played (indeed, the Rattlers were even accused of taking advantage of a system where most selectors—at the time—named their national champions before postseason bowl games; if the Rattlers were not named champs by any selector after the regular season, then they still got a second chance at the claim by winning the Orange Blossom Classic).

Contests including the Colored Championship games of 1920 and 1923 (which happened to feature members of the Central Intercollegiate Athletic Association, although the games were not played for the conference title), the Chocolate Bowl (1935), the Steel and Vulcan bowls (1940s), the National Bowl (1947), and the National Football Classic (1954) were attempted periodically but without any sustained success.

The Pelican Bowl, a bowl game that tried to match up the conference champions from the Mid-Eastern Athletic Conference (MEAC) and the Southwestern Athletic Conference (SWAC), was another such example—and actually did manage to last several seasons—but even this venture failed to draw enough attendance and lasted only a few years in the 1970s. Similarly, the Heritage Bowl was played in the 1990s featuring teams from the MEAC and SWAC, but this bowl game has not been held since 1999 and was often snubbed by the conference champions in lieu of the NCAA's Division I-AA playoffs; indeed, five teams of the Heritage Bowl era were still able to claim black national titles from various selectors after declining their bids to the bowl game.

=== Celebration Bowl ===
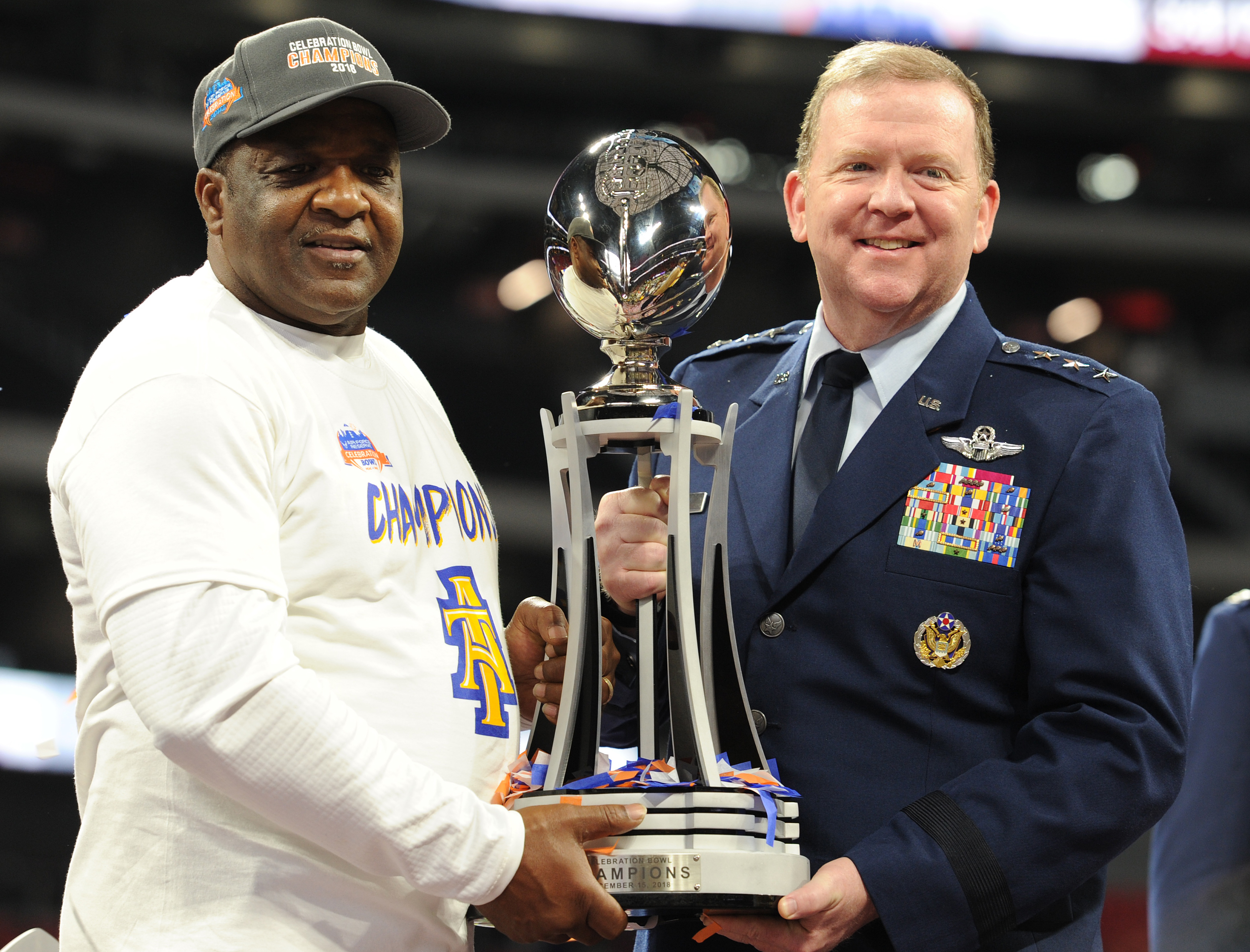
Head coach Sam Washington (left) receiving the 2018 Celebration Bowl trophy from Richard W. Scobee

The MEAC and SWAC began negotiations in 2010 to create a successor called the "Legacy Bowl"—not to be confused with a like-named 2015 exhibition game—to begin during the 2011 postseason, but it was voted down by MEAC officials. Several seasons later, in 2015, the first Celebration Bowl was played, pitting the champions of the two conferences. While the Celebration Bowl's trophy itself only includes the inscription "Celebration Bowl Champions," the bowl's creator (ESPN), a former title sponsor (Air Force Reserve), and other prominent sponsors, have indicated that it is for the HBCU national title—as have coaches of participating teams, the two competing conferences, and even the NCAA's website.

However, with Tennessee State being a member of the Ohio Valley Conference (OVC), the Celebration Bowl could not fully represent all HBCUs within the NCAA's Football Championship Subdivision. Further, Hampton and North Carolina A&T later withdrew from the MEAC (after the 2017 and 2019 seasons, respectively) to join the Big South Conference (both programs later joined CAA Football). Despite watching Tennessee State struggle to a losing record in games played since joining the OVC in 1988, these teams exited the MEAC citing lower travel costs, join a high-profile conference, and the opportunity to compete for an NCAA FCS championship. This is not the first time that some individual schools have been isolated from the HBCU championship process; in 1960, the Associated Negro Press stated: "A total of 76 Negro colleges played football during the past season. Cheyney State and Langston were not considered in (our) rating because most of their games were against non-Negro colleges."

=== Milestones ===
Noteworthy team accomplishments include the 16 HBCU championships won all-time by Florida A&M (under five different coaches) and Tennessee State (also under five different coaches) and the five won consecutively by Central State from 1986 to 1990 (all five under coach Billy Joe). Florida A&M has also won titles in nine different decades. Southern (1948), Prairie View A&M (1953), Tuskegee (2000 and 2007), and North Carolina A&T (2017) have each achieved the best single-season won–loss record of 12–0. Winston–Salem State (2012) has achieved the best single-season win total of 14 (with their only loss being in the NCAA Division II national championship game).

Noteworthy coaching accomplishments include the nine HBCU championships won by Billy Joe (seven at Central State and two at Florida A&M), John Merritt (one at Jackson State and eight at Tennessee State), and Eddie Robinson (all nine at Grambling State). Rod Broadway is the only coach to have won titles at three different schools (two at North Carolina Central, one at Grambling, and two at North Carolina A&T). Jay Hopson is the only white coach to have won a title (in 2014, at Alcorn State).

=== In other sports ===
Black national champions have been crowned regularly in football for more than a century, and the concept has also caught on with other sports, including HBCU baseball and HBCU men and women's basketball teams. There are also HBCU tournaments for golf and tennis.

== Selectors ==
Not all black national championships are determined the same way. Early poll rankings were for the best overall HBCU, while bowl games often matched champions of only two specific HBCU conferences. However, the NCAA and NAIA later split into divisions, and newer selectors have tended to rank HBCU members by division only (e.g., the FCS level of NCAA Division I, NCAA Division II). The variations between how champions have been selected over the years has not been completely without controversy—partly because of the issue of NCAA Division II and NAIA schools being ranked higher than FCS schools and partly because of the concern that the voters in the polls may not necessarily be well-informed about so many different schools. However, the issue may have been somewhat ameliorated when American Sports Wire began limiting HBCU champions to FCS-level schools only in an era when an NAIA school (Central State) held a stranglehold over the overall HBCU championship—possibly in part because NAIA schools were not affected by the NCAA's Proposition 48, a then-new rule that had concerned some educators about its impact on black student-athletes.

The impact of the Pelican, Heritage, and Celebration bowls cannot be overstated, however. In the 16 seasons (through 2018) that those bowl games were held, MEAC or SWAC schools were named overall HBCU champions almost exclusively; only in 1992 did a school with no ties to the MEAC or SWAC even earn a share of the overall HBCU championship—two selectors still chose a SWAC school as the overall champion but one selector did choose Central State (which had won the NAIA Division I national championship). Also, in 1994 soon-to-be MEAC member Hampton was named HBCU overall champ by a single selector while five other selectors gave the title to full MEAC member South Carolina State.

Selector	Name	Seasons	Eligible teams
ADW	Atlanta Daily World & 100% Wrong Club–W. A. Scott II Memorial Trophy (1953–1992, 2010); Coca-Cola National Historical Black College Football Championship Award (1993–2009)	1953–2010 (2010 champion is not available)	all HBCU teams
AHSR-I	Add's HBCU Sports Report (Add Seymour, Jr.) for NCAA Division I FCS teams	2013–2016	NCAA Division I FCS HBCU teams only
AHSR-II	Add's HBCU Sports Report (Add Seymour, Jr.) for NCAA Division II teams	2013–2016	NCAA Division II HBCU teams only
ANP	Associated Negro Press (Luix Virgil Overbea)	1948–1960 (1957 champion is not available)	HBCU teams that played a majority of their games against other HBCU teams only
ASW	American Sports Wire (Dick Simpson)	1990–2013	NCAA Division I FCS HBCU teams only
B-CP	BOXTOROW (& formerly Black Athlete Sports Network)–Coaches Poll	2009–present	NCAA Division I FCS HBCU teams only
B-MP	BOXTOROW (& formerly Black Athlete Sports Network)–Media Poll	2007–present	all HBCU teams
BAA	Baltimore Afro-American	1947–1948, 1953	all HBCU teams
BCASB	Black College All Star Bowl—Eddie Hurt National Championship Trophy	1978–1979	all HBCU teams
BCNC-I	Black College National Championship for NCAA Division I FCS teams	2016–present	NCAA Division I FCS HBCU teams only
BCNC-II&N	Black College National Championship for NCAA Division II and NAIA teams	2016–present	NCAA Division II and NAIA HBCU teams only
BCSN-I	Black College Sports Network for NCAA Division I FCS teams	2019	NCAA Division I FCS HBCU teams only
BCSN-II&N	Black College Sports Network for NCAA Division II and NAIA teams	2019	NCAA Division II and NAIA HBCU teams only
BCSP	Black College Sports Page (Carl "Lut" Williams & formerly Major Broadcasting Cable)	1994–2020 (1995–1999 champions are not available)	all HBCU teams
BCSP-I	Black College Sports Page (Carl "Lut" Williams) for NCAA Division I FCS teams	2021–present	NCAA Division I FCS HBCU teams only
BCSP-II	Black College Sports Page (Carl "Lut" Williams) for NCAA Division II teams	2021–present	NCAA Division II HBCU teams only
BCSR	Black College Sports Report (Edd Hayes)	1993	all HBCU teams
CAAC	Champion Aggregation of All Conferences (William Lawrence "Paul" Jones)	1921–1949 (1927–1928, 1930–1932, and 1936–1949 champions are not available)	all HBCU teams
CC	Colored Championship	1920, 1923	all HBCU teams
"Celebration Bowl"; AFRCB; CeB; CCB	Air Force Reserve Celebration Bowl; Celebration Bowl; Cricket Celebration Bowl	2015–2019, 2021–present 2015–2016, 2018; 2017, 2019; 2021–present	MEAC and SWAC champions only
ChB	Chocolate Bowl	1935	all HBCU teams
DCCC-M	Dr. Cavil's Classic Cuts (Jafus Kenyatta Cavil & formerly SWAC Page Network)–Major Division Poll	2002–present	NCAA Division I FCS HBCU teams only
DCCC-MM	Dr. Cavil's Classic Cuts (Jafus Kenyatta Cavil & formerly SWAC Page Network)–Mid-Major Division Poll	2002–2019, 2021–present	NCAA Division II and NAIA HBCU teams only
"Heritage Bowl"; AHB; HB	Alamo Heritage Bowl I Heritage Bowl IV	1991, 1994*; 1991; 1994	MEAC and SWAC champions only
HBCUS-PFP	HBCU Sports–Playoff Fan Poll	2014	all HBCU teams
HBCUS-UP	HBCU Sports–Ultimate Poll	2015, 2019, 2021–present	all HBCU teams
HSRN-I	Heritage Sports Radio Network–HSRN Conaway Cup for NCAA Division I FCS teams	2011–2016	NCAA Division I FCS HBCU teams only
HSRN-II&N	Heritage Sports Radio Network–HSRN Conaway Cup for NCAA Division II and NAIA teams	2011–2016	NCAA Division II and NAIA HBCU teams only
J	Jet (Frank T. Bannister, Jr.)—Paul Robeson Perpetual Trophy	1973–1987, 1990–1992	all HBCU teams
JBM	John B. "Johnny" McLendon, Jr. based on the Dickinson System	1953	all HBCU teams
LAFCF	Los Angeles Football Classic Foundation (Fred H. Cooper)–Eddie G. Robinson Trophy	1988	all HBCU teams
MBN	Mutual Black Network	1972–1978	all HBCU teams
NB	National Bowl	1947	all HBCU teams
NBN	National Black Network (Frank T. Bannister, Jr.)	1975–1978 (1976 champion is not available)	all HBCU teams
NBT	National Black Television	2011	all HBCU teams
NCAAC	ncaa.com—HBCU Football Power Rankings (Stan Becton)	2021–present	NCAA Division I FCS HBCU teams only
NFC	National Football Classic	1954	CIAA and Midwestern Conference champions only
PB	Pelican Bowl	1972, 1974–1975*	MEAC and SWAC champions only
PCWDC	Pigskin Club of Washington, DC—William G. "Billy" Coward Award	2006–2013	all HBCU teams
"Sheridan Poll"; PC; NPC; SBN; AURN; PNRN	Jake Gaither National Championship Trophy; Pittsburgh Courier; New Pittsburgh Courier; Sheridan Broadcasting Network; American Urban Radio Networks; Power News Radio Network	1920–present 1920–1965; 1966–1978; 1979–1990; 1991–2016; 2017–present	all HBCU teams
SIC	si.com—HBCU Legends Top 5 Power Rankings	2021–present	NCAA Division I FCS HBCU teams only
TAJTT	T. A. Jones' Talented 10th (Trevin A. "T. A." Jones)	2014	all HBCU teams
UMTC	UrbanMediaToday.com (Trevin A. "T. A." Jones)	2017–present	all HBCU teams
"Vulcan Bowl"; SB; VB	Steel Bowl; Vulcan Bowl	1940–1941**; 1940; 1941	all HBCU teams (but with the Southern Intercollegiate Athletic Conference champion holding an automatic bid)

Notes: *—the Pelican Bowl (played 1972 and 1974–75) and Heritage Bowl (played 1991–99) were intended as black national championship games matching the outright champions or top-seeded co-champions of the MEAC and SWAC conferences, but in practice the top seeds often declined their automatic bids to participate in the NCAA playoffs instead—only the 1972, 1975, and 1994 games matched the top seeds of both conferences as originally intended, although the Pelican Bowl is known to have been promoted as a black national championship game all three seasons (in 1991, however, the Heritage Bowl's committee intentionally issued the MEAC's bid to its second-seeded co-champion, because one of the top-seeded co-champion's conference wins had been determined by a forfeit, instead of on the field); **—the Steel Bowl/Vulcan Bowl (played after the 1940–48 and 1951 seasons) is known to have been promoted as a black national championship game after the 1940 and 1941 seasons

== Yearly national championship selections ==
Season	Champion(s)	Record(s)	Coach(es)	Selector(s)	Note(s)
1920	Howard	7–0	Edward Morrison	CC, PC	
1920	Talladega	5–0–1	Jubie Bragg	PC	
1921	Lincoln (PA)	8–1	John A. Shelburne	CAAC	record includes forfeited game (was 8–0)
1921	Talladega	6–0–1	Jubie Bragg	PC	
1921	Wiley	7–0–1	Jason Grant	PC	
1922	Hampton	6–1	Gideon Smith	PC	record includes forfeited game (was 5–1)
1922	West Virginia Collegiate	3–0–1	Adolph Hamblin	CAAC	
1923	Howard	7–0–1	Louis L. Watson	CAAC, CC	tied Lincoln (PA) in the Colored Championship game, 6–6
1923	Lincoln (PA)	5–1–2	Ulysses S. Young	CC	tied Howard in the Colored Championship game, 6–6
1923	Virginia Union	5–0–2	Harold D. Martin	PC	
1924	Lincoln (PA)	7–1–1	Ulysses S. Young	CAAC	record includes forfeited game (was 8–0–1)
1924	Paul Quinn	6–0–3	Harry Long	PC	
1924	Tuskegee	9–0–1	Cleve Abbott	PC	
1925	Howard	6–0–2	Louis L. Watson	PC	
1925	Tuskegee	8–0–1	Cleve Abbott	CAAC, PC	
1926	Howard	7–0	Louis L. Watson	CAAC, PC	
1926	Tuskegee	10–0	Cleve Abbott	PC	
1927	Bluefield	8–0–1	Harry R. Jefferson	PC	
1927	Tuskegee	10–0–1	Cleve Abbott	PC	
1928	Bluefield	8–0–1	Harry R. Jefferson	PC	
1928	Wiley	10–0–1	Fred T. Long	PC	
1929	Tuskegee	9–0	Cleve Abbott	CAAC, PC	
1930	Tuskegee	11–0–1	Cleve Abbott	PC	Southern (5–1–1) was also named HBCU champions by an unspecified source with an unknown degree of credibility
1931	Wilberforce	9–0	Harry C. Graves	PC	
1932	Wiley	9–0	Fred T. Long	PC	
1933	Kentucky State	4–3	Henry Kean	CAAC	
1933	Morgan	9–0	Edward P. Hurt	PC	
1934	Kentucky State	9–0	Henry Kean	CAAC, PC	
1935	Kentucky State	9–1	Henry Kean	CAAC	
1935	Texas College	9–0–2	Ace Mumford	ChB, PC	
1936	Virginia State	7–0–2	Harry R. Jefferson	PC	
1936	West Virginia State	8–0	Adolph Hamblin	PC	
1937	Morgan	7–0	Edward P. Hurt	PC	
1938	Florida A&M	8–0	William M. Bell	PC	
1939	Langston	9–0	Caesar Felton Gayles	PC	
1940	Morris Brown	9–1	Artis P. Graves	PC, SB	
1941	Langston	10–1	Caesar Felton Gayles	VB	record includes forfeited game (was 9–1–1) Beat Morris Brown 13-0 in Vulcan Bowl
1941	Morris Brown	10–1	Billy Nicks	PC	
1942	Florida A&M	9–0	William M. Bell	PC	
1943	Morgan State	5–0	Edward P. Hurt	PC	
1944	Morgan State	6–1	Edward P. Hurt	PC	
1945	Wiley	10–0	Fred T. Long	PC	
1946	Morgan State	8–0	Edward P. Hurt	PC	
1946	Tennessee A&I	10–1	Henry Kean	PC	
1947	Shaw	10–0	Howard K. Wilson	NB, PC	
1947	Tennessee A&I	10–0	Henry Kean	BAA, PC	
1948	Southern	12–0	Ace Mumford	ANP, BAA, PC	
1948	Wilberforce State	9–1–1	Gaston F. Lewis	BAA	
1949	Morgan State	8–0	Edward P. Hurt	PC	
1949	Southern	10–0–1	Ace Mumford	ANP, PC	
1950	Florida A&M	8–1–1	Jake Gaither	PC	
1950	Southern	10–0–1	Ace Mumford	ANP, PC	
1951	Morris Brown	10–1	Edward Clemons	PC	
1951	North Carolina A&T	7–1–1	William M. Bell	ANP	
1952	Florida A&M	8–2	Jake Gaither	ANP, PC	
1953	Florida A&M	10–1	Jake Gaither	BAA	
1953	Prairie View A&M	12–0	Billy Nicks	ADW, ANP, PC	
1953	Tennessee A&I	8–0–1	Henry Kean	JBM	
1954	Florida A&M	8–1	Jake Gaither	ADW, PC	
1954	North Carolina College	7–1–1	Herman Riddick	NFC, PC	
1954	Prairie View A&M	10–1	Billy Nicks	ADW, PC	
1954	Southern	10–1	Ace Mumford	ADW, PC	
1954	Tennessee A&I	10–1	Henry Kean	ADW, ANP, PC	
1955	Grambling	10–0	Eddie Robinson	ADW, ANP, PC	
1956	Tennessee A&I	10–0	Howard C. Gentry	ADW, ANP, PC	
1957	Florida A&M	9–0	Jake Gaither	ADW, PC	
1958	Prairie View A&M	10–0–1	Billy Nicks	ADW, ANP, PC	retired W. A. Scott II Memorial Trophy as first three-time winner
1959	Florida A&M	10–0	Jake Gaither	ADW, ANP, PC	
1960	Southern	9–1	Ace Mumford	ADW, ANP, PC	Prairie View A&M (10–1) was also named HBCU champions by an unspecified source with an unknown degree of credibility
1961	Florida A&M	10–0	Jake Gaither	ADW, PC	
1962	Florida A&M	9–1	Jake Gaither	ADW	retired W. A. Scott II Memorial Trophy as first three-time winner since the previous trophy had been retired; won AP small college national championship
1962	Jackson State	10–1	John Merritt	PC	
1963	Prairie View A&M	10–1	Billy Nicks	ADW, PC	
1964	Prairie View A&M	9–0	Billy Nicks	ADW, PC	
1965	Tennessee A&I	9–0–1	John Merritt	ADW, PC	
1966	Tennessee A&I	10–0	John Merritt	ADW, NPC	
1967	Grambling	9–1	Eddie Robinson	ADW, NPC	
1967	Morgan State	8–0	Earl Banks	NPC	
1968	Alcorn A&M	9–1	Marino Casem	ADW, NPC	
1968	North Carolina A&T	8–1	Hornsby Howell	NPC	
1969	Alcorn A&M	8–0–1	Marino Casem	ADW, NPC	
1970	Tennessee State	11–0	John Merritt	ADW, NPC	
1971	Tennessee State	9–1	John Merritt	ADW, NPC	
1972	Grambling	11–2	Eddie Robinson	ADW, MBN, NPC, PB	record includes forfeited game (was 10–2); won Pelican Bowl
1973	Tennessee State	10–0	John Merritt	ADW, J, MBN, NPC	retired W. A. Scott II Memorial Trophy as first three-time winner (actually five-time winner by this point) since the previous trophy had been retired; won AP and UPI small college national championships; had players ruled ineligible for NCAA Division II Playoffs and declined bid
1974	Alcorn State	9–2	Marino Casem	NPC	declined automatic bid to Pelican Bowl to participate in NCAA Division II playoffs
1974	Grambling State	11–1	Eddie Robinson	ADW, J, MBN, NPC, PB	won Pelican Bowl
1975	Grambling State	10–2	Eddie Robinson	ADW, J, MBN, NBN, NPC	record includes forfeited game (was 10–1); had SWAC championship ruled vacated and, by extension, not eligible for automatic bid to Pelican Bowl
1975	Southern	9–3	Charles Bates	PB	won Pelican Bowl
1976	South Carolina State	10–1	Willie Jeffries	ADW, J, MBN, NPC	
1977	Florida A&M	11–0	Rudy Hubbard	ADW, J, MBN, NBN, NPC	Winston–Salem State initially won the NBN championship, due to the reporting of an incorrect game result
1977	Grambling State	10–1	Eddie Robinson	NPC	
1977	South Carolina State	9–1–1	Willie Jeffries	NPC	
1978	Florida A&M	12–1	Rudy Hubbard	ADW, BCASB, J, MBN, NBN, NPC	won NCAA Division I-AA Pioneer Bowl National Championship
1979	Tennessee State	8–3	John Merritt	ADW, BCASB, J, SBN	
1980	Grambling State	10–2	Eddie Robinson	ADW, J, SBN	retired W. A. Scott II Memorial Trophy as first three-time winner since the previous trophy had been retired
1981	South Carolina State	10–3	Bill Davis	ADW, SBN	
1981	Virginia Union	11–1	Willard Bailey	J	NCAA Division II
1982	South Carolina State	9–3	Bill Davis	ADW	
1982	Tennessee State	9–0–1	John Merritt	J, SBN	record does not include voided games (was 10–1–1)
1983	Central State	12–1	Billy Joe	J	NCAA Division II
1983	Grambling State	8–1–2	Eddie Robinson	SBN	
1983	Tennessee State	8–2–1	John Merritt	ADW	
1984	Alcorn State	9–1	Marino Casem	ADW, SBN	
1984	Tennessee State	11–0	William A. Thomas	J	
1985	Hampton	10–2	Fred Freeman	J	NCAA Division II
1985	Jackson State	8–3	W. C. Gorden	ADW, SBN	
1986	Central State	10–1–1	Billy Joe	ADW, J, SBN	NCAA Division II
1987	Central State	10–1–1	Billy Joe	J, SBN	NAIA
1987	Howard	0–10	Willie Jeffries	ADW	record includes forfeited games (was 9–1)
1988	Central State	11–2	Billy Joe	ADW, LAFCF, SBN	NAIA
1989	Central State	10–3	Billy Joe	ADW, SBN	NAIA
1990	Central State	11–1	Billy Joe	ADW, J, SBN	won NAIA Division I Champion Bowl National Championship
1990	North Carolina A&T	9–2	Bill Hayes	ASW	
1991	Alabama State	11–0–1	Houston Markham	ADW, AHB, ASW, AURN, J	won Alamo Heritage Bowl I
1992	Central State	12–1	Billy Joe	ADW	won NAIA Division I Champion Bowl National Championship
1992	Grambling State	10–2	Eddie Robinson	ASW, AURN, J	won Heritage Bowl II
1993	Howard	11–1	Steve Wilson	ADW, AURN	declined automatic bid to Heritage Bowl III to participate in NCAA Division I-AA playoffs
1993	Southern	11–1	Pete Richardson	ASW, BCSR	won Heritage Bowl III
1994	Hampton	10–1	Joe Taylor	AURN	NCAA Division II
1994	South Carolina State	10–2	Willie Jeffries	ADW, ASW, BCSP, HB	won Heritage Bowl IV
1995	Southern	11–1	Pete Richardson	ADW, ASW, AURN	won Jim Walter Homes Heritage Bowl V
1996	Howard	10–2	Steve Wilson	ADW, AURN	won McDonald's Heritage Bowl VI
1996	Jackson State	10–2	James Carson	ASW	declined automatic bid to McDonald's Heritage Bowl VI to participate in NCAA Division I-AA playoffs
1997	Hampton	10–2	Joe Taylor	AURN	declined automatic bid to McDonald's Heritage Bowl VII to participate in NCAA Division I-AA playoffs
1997	Southern	11–1	Pete Richardson	ADW, ASW	won McDonald's Heritage Bowl VII
1998	Florida A&M	11–2	Billy Joe	ASW, AURN	declined bid to McDonald's Heritage Bowl VIII (after MEAC's top seed also declined it) to participate in NCAA Division I-AA playoffs
1998	Southern	9–3	Pete Richardson	ADW	won McDonald's Heritage Bowl VIII; may have retired Coca-Cola National Historical Black College Football Championship Award as first three-time winner since the previous trophy had been retired (it is not immediately clear if this was done, however)
1999	North Carolina A&T	11–2	Bill Hayes	ADW, ASW, AURN	declined automatic bid to McDonald's Heritage Bowl IX to participate in NCAA Division I-AA playoffs
2000	Grambling State	10–2	Doug Williams	ASW	
2000	Tuskegee	12–0	Rick Comegy	ADW, AURN, BCSP	NCAA Division II
2001	Florida A&M	7–4	Billy Joe	ADW	
2001	Grambling State	11–0	Doug Williams	ASW, AURN, BCSP	record includes forfeited game (was 10–1)
2001	Tuskegee	11–1	Rick Comegy	BCSP	NCAA Division II
2002	Bethune–Cookman	11–2	Alvin Wyatt	BCSP	
2002	Fayetteville State	10–2	Kenny Phillips	DCCC-MM	NCAA Division II
2002	Grambling State	11–2	Doug Williams	ADW, ASW, AURN, BCSP, DCCC-M	
2003	Albany State	10–2	Mike White	DCCC-MM	NCAA Division II
2003	Southern	12–1	Pete Richardson	ADW, ASW, AURN, BCSP, DCCC-M	
2004	Albany State	11–1	Mike White	ADW, BCSP, DCCC-MM	NCAA Division II
2004	Hampton	10–2	Joe Taylor	ASW, AURN, DCCC-M	
2005	Grambling State	11–1	Melvin Spears	AURN, BCSP, DCCC-M	
2005	Hampton	11–1	Joe Taylor	ADW, ASW	
2005	North Carolina Central	10–2	Rod Broadway	DCCC-MM	NCAA Division II
2006	Hampton	10–2	Joe Taylor	ASW, BCSP, DCCC-M	
2006	North Carolina Central	11–1	Rod Broadway	ADW, AURN, BCSP, DCCC-MM, PCWDC	NCAA Division II
2007	Delaware State	10–2	Al Lavan	ASW, DCCC-M	
2007	Tuskegee	12–0	Willie J. Slater	ADW, AURN, B-MP, BCSP, DCCC-MM, PCWDC	NCAA Division II
2008	Grambling State	11–2	Rod Broadway	ADW, ASW, AURN, B-MP, BCSP, DCCC-M, PCWDC	
2008	South Carolina State	10–3	Oliver Pough	BCSP	
2008	Tuskegee	10–1	Willie J. Slater	DCCC-MM	NCAA Division II
2009	Prairie View A&M	9–1	Henry Frazier III	ASW, BCSP, DCCC-M	
2009	South Carolina State	10–2	Oliver Pough	ADW, AURN, B-CP, B-MP, BCSP, PCWDC	
2009	Tuskegee	10–2	Willie J. Slater	DCCC-MM	NCAA Division II
2010	Albany State	11–1	Mike White	AURN, BCSP, DCCC-MM, PCWDC	NCAA Division II
2010	Bethune–Cookman	10–2	Brian Jenkins	ASW, B-CP, B-MP	
2010	Texas Southern	0–3	Johnnie Cole	DCCC-M	record does not include vacated games (was 9–3)
2011	Alabama State	8–3	Reggie Barlow	DCCC-M	
2011	Norfolk State	0–3	Pete Adrian	ASW, B-CP, HSRN-I	record does not include vacated games (was 9–3)
2011	Winston–Salem State	13–1	Connell Maynor	AURN, B-MP, BCSP, DCCC-MM, HSRN-II&N, NBT, PCWDC	NCAA Division II
2012	Arkansas–Pine Bluff	10–2	Monte Coleman	ASW, B-CP, HSRN-I	
2012	Bethune–Cookman	9–3	Brian Jenkins	AURN	
2012	Tennessee State	8–3	Rod Reed	DCCC-M	
2012	Winston–Salem State	14–1	Connell Maynor	B-MP, BCSP, DCCC-MM, HSRN-II&N, PCWDC	NCAA Division II
2013	Bethune–Cookman	10–3	Brian Jenkins	AHSR-I, B-CP, B-MP, DCCC-M, PCWDC	
2013	Tennessee State	10–4	Rod Reed	ASW, AURN, BCSP, HSRN-I	
2013	Winston–Salem State	10–2	Connell Maynor	AHSR-II, DCCC-MM, HSRN-II&N	NCAA Division II
2014	Alcorn State	10–3	Jay Hopson	AHSR-I, AURN, B-CP, B-MP, BCSP, DCCC-M, HSRN-I, TAJTT	
2014	Virginia State	10–2	Latrell Scott	AHSR-II, DCCC-MM, HBCUS-PFP HSRN-II&N	NCAA Division II
2015	North Carolina A&T	10–2	Rod Broadway	AFRCB, AHSR-I, AURN, B-CP, B-MP, BCSP, DCCC-M, HBCUS-UP, HSRN-I	
2015	Tuskegee	10–3	Willie J. Slater	AHSR-II, DCCC-MM, HSRN-II&N	NCAA Division II
2016	Grambling State	12–1	Broderick Fobbs	AFRCB, AHSR-I, AURN, B-CP, B-MP, BCNC-I, BCSP, DCCC-M, HSRN-I	
2016	Tuskegee	9–3	Willie J. Slater	AHSR-II	NCAA Division II
2016	Winston–Salem State	9–3	Kienus Boulware	BCNC-II&N, DCCC-MM, HSRN-II&N	NCAA Division II
2017	North Carolina A&T	12–0	Rod Broadway	B-CP, B-MP, BCNC-I, BCSP, CeB, DCCC-M, PNRN, UMTC	
2017	Langston	10–1	Quinton Morgan	DCCC-MM	NAIA
2017	Virginia State	10–1	Reggie Barlow	BCNC-II&N, DCCC-MM	NCAA Division II
2018	Bowie State	9–3	Damon Wilson	BCNC-II&N, DCCC-MM	NCAA Division II
2018	North Carolina A&T	10–2	Sam Washington	AFRCB, B-CP, B-MP, BCNC-I, BCSP, DCCC-M, PNRN, UMTC	
2019	Bowie State	11–1	Damon Wilson	BCNC-II&N, BCSN-II&N, DCCC-MM	NCAA Division II
2019	Florida A&M	9–2	Willie Simmons	BCSN-I	ruled ineligible for MEAC championship and postseason play and, by extension, not eligible for automatic bid to Celebration Bowl
2019	North Carolina A&T	9–3	Sam Washington	B-CP, B-MP, BCNC-I, BCSP, CeB, DCCC-M, HBCUS-UP, UMTC	
2020	Alabama A&M	5–0	Connell Maynor	PNRN, B-CP, B-MP, BCSP, DCCC-M	
2021	Bowie State	12–2	Damon Wilson	B-MP, BCNC-II&N, BCSN-II&N, BCSP-II, DCCC-MM, UMTC	NCAA Division II
2021	Jackson State	11–2	Deion Sanders	BCNC-I, BCSN-I	
2021	South Carolina State	7–5	Oliver Pough	B-CP, BCSP-I, CCB, DCCC-M, HBCUS-UP, SIC	
2022	Benedict	11–1	Chennis Berry	B-CP, BCNC-II&N, BCSN-II&N, DCCC-MM, HBCUS-UP	NCAA Division II
2022	North Carolina Central	10–2	Trei Oliver	B-CP, B-MP, BCNC-I, BCSN-I, CCB, DCCC-M, HBCUS-UP	
2023	Benedict	11–1	Chennis Berry	B-CP	NCAA Division II
2023	Florida A&M	12–1	Willie Simmons	CCB	
2024	Jackson State	11–2	T. C. Taylor	CCB	
2024	Virginia Union	10–4	Alvin Parker	B-CP	NCAA Division II
2025	South Carolina State	10–3	Chennis Berry	CCB	
2025	Albany State	12–2	Quinn Gray	B-CP	NCAA Division II

== National championships by school ==
School	National championships	Season(s)
Grambling State	15	1955, 1967, 1972, 1974, 1975, 1977, 1980, 1983, 1992, 2000, 2001, 2002, 2005, 2008, 2016
Florida A&M	15	1938, 1942, 1950, 1952, 1953, 1954, 1957, 1959, 1961, 1962, 1977, 1978, 1998, 2019, 2023
Tennessee State	12	1946, 1947, 1954, 1956, 1965, 1966, 1970, 1971, 1973, 1979, 1982, 2013
Tuskegee	9	1924, 1925, 1926, 1927, 1929, 1930, 2007, 2009, 2015
Southern	9	1948, 1949, 1950, 1954, 1960, 1993, 1995, 1997, 2003
North Carolina A&T	8	1951, 1968, 1990, 1999, 2015, 2017, 2018, 2019
Central State	8	1948, 1983, 1986, 1987, 1988, 1989, 1990, 1992
South Carolina State	7	1976, 1981, 1982, 1994, 2009, 2021, 2025
Howard	7	1920, 1923, 1925, 1926, 1987, 1993, 1996
Morgan State	7	1933, 1937, 1943, 1944, 1946, 1949, 1967
Hampton	6	1922, 1985, 1994, 1997, 2004, 2006
Prairie View A&M	6	1953, 1954, 1958, 1963, 1964, 2009
Alcorn State	5	1968, 1969, 1974, 1984, 2014
Albany State	4	2003, 2004, 2010, 2025
Bethune–Cookman	4	2002, 2010, 2012, 2013
North Carolina Central	4	1954, 2005, 2006, 2022
Virginia State	4	1936, 1952, 2014, 2017
Wiley	4	1921, 1928, 1932, 1945
Winston-Salem State	4	2011, 2012, 2013, 2016
Jackson State	3	1962, 1996, 2024
Bowie State	3	2018, 2019, 2021
Kentucky State	3	1933, 1934, 1935
Langston	3	1939, 1941, 2017
Lincoln (PA)	3	1921, 1923, 1924
Morris Brown	3	1940, 1941, 1951
Alabama State	2	1991, 2011
Benedict	2	2022, 2023
Bluefield State	2	1927, 1928
Talladega	2	1920, 1921
Texas Southern	2	1952, 2010
Virginia Union	2	1923, 1981
West Virginia State	2	1922, 1936
Alabama A&M	1	2020
Arkansas–Pine Bluff	1	2012
Delaware State	1	2007
Fayetteville State	1	2002
Lincoln (MO)	1	1952
Norfolk State	1	2011
Paul Quinn	1	1924
Shaw	1	1947
Texas College	1	1935
Wilberforce	1	1931

== See also ==
- Black players in professional American football
- History of African Americans in the Canadian Football League
- Racial issues faced by black quarterbacks
- List of black quarterbacks
- Black participation in college basketball
- List of African-American sports firsts
