= 1933 Morgan Bears football team =

American college football season

1933 Morgan Bears football

Black college national champion CIAA champion
- Conference: Colored Intercollegiate Athletic Association
- Record: 9–0 (8–0 CIAA)
- Head coach: Edward P. Hurt (5th season)

1933 Colored Intercollegiate Athletic Association football standings
	Conf.					Overall
Team	W		L		T	W		L		T
Morgan $	8	–	0	–	0	9	–	0	–	0
Hampton	7	–	1	–	1	7	–	1	–	1
Bluefield State	4	–	1	–	2	5	–	2	–	2
Virginia Union	4	–	2	–	3	4	–	2	–	4
Saint Paul's (VA)	4	–	2	–	2	4	–	2	–	4
North Carolina A&T	3	–	3	–	3	3	–	3	–	3
North Carolina College	4	–	4	–	0	4	–	4	–	0
Howard	3	–	3	–	0	3	–	3	–	0
Johnson C. Smith	1	–	5	–	0	1	–	5	–	0
Virginia State	1	–	8	–	0	1	–	8	–	0
Lincoln (PA)	0	–	4	–	1	1	–	4	–	2
Shaw	0	–	6	–	0	1	–	6	–	0
$ – Conference champion

The 1933 Morgan Bears football team was an American football team that represented Morgan College in the Colored Intercollegiate Athletic Association (CIAA) during the 1933 college football season. In their fifth season under head coach Edward P. Hurt, the Bears compiled a 9–0 record, won the CIAA championship, shut out eight of nine opponents, and outscored all opponents by a total of 319 to 6. The Bears were recognized as the 1933 black college national champion.

Morgan players receiving first-team All-CIAA honors included Howard K. Wilson at quarterback, Troupe at fullback, Tom Conrad at left halfback, Crawford at right end, Williams at left tackle, and Hill at center.

== Schedule ==
Date	Opponent	Site	Result	Attendance	Source
September 30	at Cheyney*	Cheyney, PA	W 25–0		
October 7	North Carolina A&T	Baltimore, MD	W 37–0		
October 14	at Virginia Union	Richmond, VA	W 25–0		
October 21	at Lincoln (PA)	P.R.R.'s YMCA Field; Philadelphia, PA	W 45–0		
October 28	Bluefield State	Baltimore, MD	W 60–0		
November 4	Howard	Bugle Field; Baltimore, MD	W 27–0		
November 11	at North Carolina College	Durham, NC	W 47–0		
November 18	at Hampton	Armstrong Field; Hampton, VA	W 13–6		
November 30	Virginia State	Baltimore, MD	W 40–0		
*Non-conference game
