= Lincoln Lions =

Lincoln Lions may refer to:

- Lincoln Lions (rugby union), a rugby union club in England
- Lincoln (Pennsylvania) Lions, the athletic teams for Lincoln University in Pennsylvania
