= 1926 Florida A&M Rattlers football team =

American college football season

1926 Florida A&M Rattlers football
- Conference: Southern Intercollegiate Athletic Conference
- Record: 2–2 (1–1 SIAC)
- Head coach: Jazz Byrd (1st season)

1926 Southern Intercollegiate Athletic Conference football standings
	Conf.					Overall
Team	W		L		T	W		L		T
Tuskegee $	8	–	0	–	0	10	–	0	–	0
Morris Brown	2	–	0	–	1	3	–	2	–	1
Talladega	3	–	2	–	0	4	–	2	–	0
Atlanta	4	–	3	–	1	4	–	4	–	1
Florida A&M	1	–	1	–	0	2	–	2	–	0
Alabama State	2	–	3	–	0	6	–	3	–	0
Knoxville	2	–	3	–	0	5	–	3	–	0
Clark (GA)	2	–	3	–	0	2	–	3	–	1
Morehouse	1	–	4	–	1	2	–	5	–	1
Tennessee State	0	–	2	–	2	2	–	2	–	2
Fisk	0	–	4	–	1	2	–	5	–	1
$ – Conference champion

The 1926 Florida A&M Rattlers football team represented represented Florida Agricultural and Mechanical College for Negroes (FAMC)—now known as Florida A&M University—as a member of the Southern Intercollegiate Athletic Conference (SIAC) during the 1926 college football season. Led by first-year head coach Jazz Byrd, the Rattlers compiled an overall record of 2–2 with a mark of 1–1 in conference play, placing fifth in the SIAC.

== Schedule ==
Date	Time	Opponent	Site	Result	Source
October 9		at Tuskegee	Tuskegee, AL	L 6–73	
October 27		Claflin*	Tallahassee, FL	W 17–0	
November 19	3:30 p.m.	at Bethune–Cookman*	College Park; Daytona Beach, FL	L 0–12	
November 25		Alabama State	Tallahassee, FL	W 6–0	
*Non-conference game; All times are in Eastern time
