= List of Tennessee State Tigers football seasons =

The following is a list of Tennessee State Tigers football seasons for the football team that has represented Tennessee State University in NCAA competition.

== Seasons ==
Year	Coach	Overall	Conference	Standing	Bowl/playoffs	TSN/STATS^{#}	Coaches'^{°}
Buck Hunt (Independent) (1916)
1916	Buck Hunt	0–0–1					
Buck Hunt:		0–0–1					
Unknown (Independent) (1922–1923)
1922	Unknown	1–1					
1923	Unknown	2–1					
Joe E. Suggs (Independent) (1924)
1924	Joe E. Suggs	4–1–1					
Joe E. Suggs:		4–1–1					
George Davenport (Independent) (1925)
1925	George Davenport	4–1–1					
George Davenport (Southern Intercollegiate Athletic Conference) (1926)
1926	George Davenport	1–2–2					
George Davenport:		5–3–3					
Caesar Felton Gayles (Southern Intercollegiate Athletic Conference) (1927)
1927	Caesar Felton Gayles	1–2–3	1–1–2				
Felton Gale:		1–2–3	1–1–2				
Harry Long (Southern Intercollegiate Athletic Conference) (1928)
1928	Harry Long	0–4–1	0–4–1				
Harry Long:		0–4–1	0–4–1				
Guy E. Hoffman (Southern Intercollegiate Athletic Conference) (1929)
1929	Guy E. Hoffman	4–1–1	2–1–1				
Guy E. Hoffman:		4–1–1	2–1–1				
T. D. Upshaw (Independent) (1930–1931)
1930	T. D. Upshaw	2–3					
1931	T. D. Upshaw	1–1					
T. D. Upshaw:		3–4					
No coach (Independent) (1932)
1932	No coach	0–2					
Walter S. Davis (Independent) (1933–1936)
1933	Walter S. Davis	5–0–1					
1934	Walter S. Davis	6–1					
1935	Walter S. Davis	5–3–1					
1936	Walter S. Davis	3–3–2					
Walter S. Davis:		19–7–4					
Reubin A. Munday (Independent) (1937–1939)
1937	Reubin A. Munday	3–1–1					
1938	Reubin A. Munday	6–1					
1939	Reubin A. Munday	4–3–1					
Reubin A. Munday:		13–5–2					
Coach Unknown (Independent) (1940)
1940	unknown	1–0					
Coach Unknown:		1–0					
Henry A. Kean (Independent) (1944)
1944	Henry A. Kean	8–2–1					
Henry A. Kean (Midwestern Conference) (1945–1954)
1945	Henry A. Kean	9–2	3–0	1st	W Tuskegee University Vulcan Bowl		
1946	Henry A. Kean	10–1	3–0	1st	W Texas College Vulcan Bowl		
1947	Henry A. Kean	10–0	3–0	1st	W Louisville Municipal Vulcan Bowl		
1948	Henry A. Kean	5–3–1					
1949	Henry A. Kean	9–1	4–0	1st			
1950	Henry A. Kean	9–2					
1951	Henry A. Kean	8–2					
1952	Henry A. Kean	8–2					
1953	Henry A. Kean	8–0					
1954	Henry A. Kean	10–1	4–0	1st	L North Carolina Central National Classic		
Henry A. Kean:		94–16–2					
Howard C. Gentry (Midwestern Conference) (1955–1960)
1955	Howard C. Gentry	7–2					
1956	Howard C. Gentry	10–0	4–0	1st	W Florida A&M Orange Blossom Classic		
1957	Howard C. Gentry	5–0–1	3–0	1st			
1958	Howard C. Gentry	4–4					
1959	Howard C. Gentry	9–1	3–0	1st			
1960	Howard C. Gentry	7–3	3–0	1st			
Howard C. Gentry:		42–10–1					
Lawrence E. Simmons (Midwestern Conference) (1961–1962)
1961	Lawrence E. Simmons	4–4–1					
1962	Lawrence E. Simmons	1–7–1					
Lawrence E. Simmons:		5–11–2					
John Merritt (Midwestern Conference) (1963–1966)
1963	John A. Merritt	6–3	3–0	1st			
1964	John A. Merritt	8–2	3–0	1st			
1965	John A. Merritt	9–0–1	2–0	1st	T Ball State Grantland Rice Bowl	5	12
1966	John A. Merritt	10–0	2–0	1st	W Muskingum University Grantland Rice Bowl	2	3
John A. Merritt (Independent) (1967–1972)
1967	John A. Merritt	6–3					
1968	John A. Merritt	6–2–1					
1969	John A. Merritt	7–1–1					
1970	John A. Merritt	11–0			W Southwestern Louisiana Grantland Rice Bowl	5	5
1971	John A. Merritt	9–1			W McNeese State Grantland Rice Bowl	5	4
1972	John A. Merritt	11–1			W Drake University Pioneer Bowl	5	5
John A. Merritt (Division II Independent) (1973–1976)
1973	John A. Merritt	10–0				1	1
1974	John A. Merritt	8–2				9	9
1975	John A. Merritt	5–4					
1976	John A. Merritt	7–2–1					
John A. Merritt (Division I Independent) (1977)
1977	John A. Merritt	8–1–1					
John A. Merritt (Division I-A Independent) (1978–1980)
1978	John A. Merritt	8–3					
1979	John A. Merritt	8–3					
1980	John A. Merritt	9–1					
John A. Merritt (Division I-AA Independent) (1981–1983)
1981	John A. Merritt	9–3			L South Carolina State NCAA Division I-AA Quarterfinal	6	
1982	John A. Merritt	10–1–1			L Eastern Kentucky NCAA Division I-AA Semifinal	4	
1983	John A. Merritt	8–2–1				17	
John A. Merritt:		173–35–7	10–0				
William A. Thomas (Division I-AA Independent) (1984–1987)
1984	William A. Thomas	11–0			No postseason due to ineligible players		
1985	William A. Thomas	7–4					
1986	William A. Thomas	10–2–1			L Nevada NCAA Division I-AA Quarterfinal	14	
1987	William A. Thomas	3–7–1					
William A. Thomas (Ohio Valley Conference) (1988)
1988	William A. Thomas	3–7–1	2–4	T–4th			
William A. Thomas:		34–20–3	2–4				
Joe Gilliam, Sr. (Ohio Valley Conference) (1989–1992)
1989	Joe Gilliam, Sr.	5–5–1	3–3	T–3rd			
1990	Joe Gilliam, Sr.	7–4	4–2	3rd			
1991	Joe Gilliam, Sr.	3–8	2–5	T–6th			
1992	Joe Gilliam, Sr.	5–6	5–3	4th			
Joe Gilliam, Sr.:		20–23–1	14–13				
Bill Davis (Ohio Valley Conference) (1993–1995)
1993	Bill Davis	4–7	4–4	T–4th			
1994	Bill Davis	5–6	4–4	T–4th			
1995	Bill Davis	2–9	1–7	T–8th			
Bill Davis:		11–22	9–15				
L. C. Cole (Ohio Valley Conference) (1996–1999)
1996	L. C. Cole	4–7	3–5	T–6th			
1997	L. C. Cole	4–7	4–3	T–4th			
1998	L. C. Cole	9–3	6–1	1st	L Appalachian State NCAA Division I-AA First Round	12	
1999	L. C. Cole	11–1	7–0	1st	L North Carolina A&T NCAA Division I-AA First Round	11	
L. C. Cole:		28–18	20–9				
James Reese (Ohio Valley Conference) (2000–2004)
2000	James Reese	3–8	2–5	6th			
2001	James Reese	8–3	3–3	4th		25	
2002	James Reese	2–10	1–5	6th			
2003	James Reese	7–5	5–3	T–3rd			
2004	James Reese	4–7	2–5	8th			
James Reese:		24–33	13–21				
James Webster (Ohio Valley Conference) (2005–2009)
2005	James Webster	2–9	1–6	8th			
2006	James Webster	6–5	5–2	3rd			
2007	James Webster	5–6	4–3	5th			
2008	James Webster	8–4	5–3	4th			
2009	James Webster	4–7	3–4	5th			
James Webster:		25–31	18–18				
Rod Reed (Ohio Valley Conference) (2010–2020)
2010	Rod Reed	3–8	0–7	9th			
2011	Rod Reed	5–6	4–4	T–5th			
2012	Rod Reed	8–3	4–3	5th			21
2013	Rod Reed	10–4	6–2	2nd	L Eastern Illinois NCAA FCS Second Round	17	17
2014	Rod Reed	6–6	3–5	6th			
2015	Rod Reed	4–6	1–6	8th			
2016	Rod Reed	7–4	4–3	4th			
2017	Rod Reed	6–5	2–5	7th			
2018	Rod Reed	4–5	3–4	5th			
2019	Rod Reed	3–9	2–6	7th			
2020	Rod Reed	2–5	2–5	6th			
Rod Reed:		58–61	31–50				
Eddie George (Ohio Valley Conference) (2021–2022)
2021	Eddie George	5–6	3–3	T–4th			
2022	Eddie George	4–7	2–3	T–3rd			
Eddie George (Big South–OVC Football Association) (2023–2024)
2023	Eddie George	6–5	2–4	T–6th			
2024	Eddie George	9–4	6–2	T–1st	L Montana NCAA Division I FCS First Round		
Eddie George:		24–22	13–12				
Reggie Barlow (Big South–OVC Football Association) (2025–present)
2025	Reggie Barlow	2–10	0–8	9th			
Reggie Barlow:		2–10	0–8				
Total:							
National championship Conference title Conference division title or championship game berth
^{#}The Sports Network/STATS.; ^{°}Coaches'.
