= 1921 Lincoln Lions football team =

American college football season

1921 Lincoln Lions football

Black college national champion
- Conference: Colored Intercollegiate Athletic Association
- Record: 8–1 (2–1 CIAA)
- Head coach: John A. Shelburne (1st season)
- Captain: James H. Law
- Home stadium: Rendall Field

1921 Colored Intercollegiate Athletic Association football standings
	Conf.					Overall
Team	W		L		T	W		L		T
Virginia Union $	3	–	0	–	0	6	–	0	–	2
Howard	4	–	1	–	0	7	–	1	–	0
Lincoln (PA)	2	–	1	–	0	8	–	1	–	0
Virginia Normal	1	–	1	–	0	2	–	1	–	1
Hampton	1	–	3	–	0	2	–	3	–	0
Shaw	0	–	2	–	0	?	–	?	–	0
Virginia Seminary	0	–	3	–	0	4	–	4	–	0
$ – Conference champion

The 1921 Lincoln Lions football team represented Lincoln University of Pennsylvania as a member of the Colored Intercollegiate Athletic Association (CIAA) during the 1921 college football season. Led by John A. Shelburne in his first and only season as head coach, the Lions compiled a record an overall record of 8–1 with a mark of 2–1 in conference play, placing third in the CIAA. The team was recognized as winning a black college football national championship, along with Talladega and Wiley. James H. Law was the team's captain.

== Schedule ==
Date	Time	Opponent	Site	Result	Attendance	Source
October 8		at Ward Athletic Club*	Annapolis, MD	W 6–0		
October 15		at Bordentown*	Bordentown NJ	W 26–0		
October 21		at Colored Hygienic Club*	Cottage Hill field; Steelton, PA	L 6–7		
October 22		at Morgan*	Morgan College campus; Baltimore, MD	W 63–0	1,000	
October 27	3:30 p.m.	at Harrisburg YMCA (Colored Men's Branch)*	Island gridiron; Harrisburg, PA	W 14–7		
October 29		at Wilberforce*	Wilberforce, OH	W 20–6		
November 5		Hampton	Rendall Field; Lincoln University, PA	W 13–0		
November 12	3:30 p.m.	at Virginia Union	Hovey Field; Richmond, VA	L 0–1 (forfeit, actual score unknown)		
November 24		vs. Howard	National League Park; Philadelphia, PA	W 13–7		
*Non-conference game; All times are in Eastern time
