= Howard–Morgan State football rivalry =

American college football rivalry

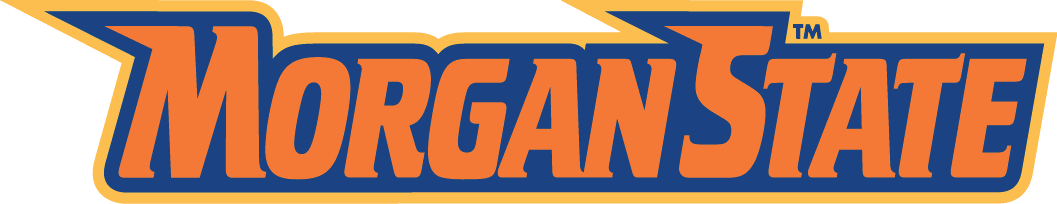
- Howard Bison Morgan State Bears
- Sport: Football
- First meeting: 1899; Howard, 71–0
- Latest meeting: October 24, 2026; Howard, 26–20^{OT}
- Next meeting: 2027

Statistics
- Total meetings: 92
- All-time series: Morgan State leads, 47–41–3
- Longest win streak: Morgan State, 15 (1953–1973)
- Current win streak: Howard, 2 (2025–present)

Locations of Howard and Morgan State

The rivalry between the Howard Bison and Morgan State Bears is a matchup between two HBCU schools, one of the oldest rivalries in black college football. The series started in 1899.

The Bison won the first game in 1899, 71 to 0. They continued to win—with the Bears scoring 0—until 1903, when the series stopped for 19 years. The series resumed in 1922, with the Bison winning by 50, though the Bears finally scoring its first points in the series. Another shutout win followed for the Bison in 1925. Eddie Hurt began coaching the Morgan State Bears in 1927, and for two years after, both teams tied with no score. The Bears first win against the Bison was in 1931. The Bison would only manage 4 wins and a tie from 1931 to 1979, then proceed to win 18 of the next 22 games from 1980 to 2001, and then only manage 3 wins from 2002 to 2016, before winning the last 6 games of the series from 2017 to 2023. Morgan State ended the streak in 2024, winning 35–21 at home.

The rivalry is driven by several factors, which include the close proximity of their locations (DC-Baltimore). Roughly only 46 miles separate the nation’s top black educational institutes. The two schools compete in the Mid-Eastern Athletic Conference.

== Game results ==
Howard victories	Morgan State victories	Tie games	Vacated wins

No.	Date	Location	Winner	Score
1	1899	Unknown	Howard	71–0
2	1900	Unknown	Howard	41–0
3	1901	Unknown	Howard	34–0
4	1902	Unknown	Howard	23–0
5	1903	Unknown	Howard	28–0
6	November 4, 1922	Washington, DC	Howard	56–6
7	October 3, 1925	Washington, DC	Howard	27–0
8	November 19, 1927	Washington, DC	Howard	26–6
9	November 24, 1928	Baltimore, MD	Tie	0–0
10	November 23, 1929	Washington, DC	Tie	0–0
11	November 7, 1931	Newark, NJ	Morgan State	19–8
12	November 5, 1932	Washington, DC	Morgan State	13–6
13	November 4, 1933	Baltimore, MD	Morgan State	27–0
14	November 3, 1934	Washington, DC	Tie	0–0
15	November 2, 1935	Baltimore, MD	Morgan State	39–0
16	October 31, 1936	Washington, DC	Morgan State	41–0
17	October 1, 1938	Baltimore, MD	Morgan State	22–0
18	November 4, 1939	Washington, DC	Morgan State	39–0
19	November 2, 1940	Baltimore, MD	Morgan State	44–6
20	October 18, 1947	Washington, DC	Howard	14–6
21	October 16, 1948	Baltimore, MD	Morgan State	13–2
22	October 15, 1949	Washington, DC	Morgan State	39–0
23	October 14, 1950	Baltimore, MD	Morgan State	32–0
24	October 13, 1951	Washington, DC	Morgan State	14–0
25	October 18, 1952	Baltimore, MD	Howard	12–7
26	October 17, 1953	Washington, DC	Morgan State	40–6
27	October 16, 1954	Baltimore, MD	Morgan State	20–7
28	October 15, 1955	Washington, DC	Morgan State	32–0
29	October 13, 1956	Baltimore, MD	Morgan State	41–0
30	October 19, 1957	Washington, DC	Morgan State	48–0
31	October 18, 1958	Baltimore, MD	Morgan State	48–0
32	October 17, 1959	Washington, DC	Morgan State	14–0
33	October 15, 1960	Baltimore, MD	Morgan State	64–6
34	October 14, 1961	Washington, DC	Morgan State	20–0
35	October 13, 1962	Baltimore, MD	Morgan State	39–6
36	October 19, 1963	Washington, DC	Morgan State	53–8
37	October 17, 1964	Baltimore, MD	Morgan State	15–8
38	November 6, 1971	Washington, DC	Morgan State	7–0
39	November 4, 1972	Baltimore, MD	Morgan State	35–13
40	November 3, 1973	Washington, DC	Morgan State	27–7
41	November 9, 1974	Baltimore, MD	Howard	30–7
42	November 27, 1975	Washington, DC	Howard	22–16
43	November 20, 1976	Washington, DC	Morgan State	34–15
44	November 19, 1977	Baltimore, MD	Morgan State	33–24
45	November 18, 1978	Washington, DC	Morgan State	10–9
46	November 17, 1979	Baltimore, MD	Morgan State	27–20
47	November 22, 1980	Washington, DC	Howard	51–6

No.	Date	Location	Winner	Score
48	November 21, 1981	Baltimore, MD	Howard	35–32
49	November 20, 1982	Washington, DC	Howard	42–19
50	November 12, 1983	Baltimore, MD	Morgan State	15–14
51	November 17, 1984	Washington, DC	Howard	47–13
52	November 16, 1985	Baltimore, MD	Howard	7–3
53	November 15, 1986	Washington, DC	Howard	60–6
54	November 14, 1987	Baltimore, MD	Howard†	62–0
55	November 12, 1988	Washington, DC	Howard	35–13
56	November 4, 1989	Baltimore, MD	Howard	31–0
57	November 3, 1990	Washington, DC	Howard	49–13
58	November 16, 1991	Baltimore, MD	Morgan State	38–28
59	November 14, 1992	Washington, DC	Howard	68–21
60	November 13, 1993	Baltimore, MD	Howard	66–37
61	November 12, 1994	Washington, DC	Morgan State	17–14
62	November 11, 1995	Baltimore, MD	Howard	29–17
63	November 16, 1996	Washington, DC	Howard	49–0
64	November 15, 1997	San Diego, CA	Howard	30–27
65	November 14, 1998	Washington, DC	Howard	69–3
66	November 13, 1999	Baltimore, MD	Howard	42–38
67	September 23, 2000	Washington, DC	Howard	35–23
68	September 22, 2001	Baltimore, MD	Howard	41–15
69	October 19, 2002	Washington, DC	Morgan State	38–20
70	October 18, 2003	Baltimore, MD	Morgan State	33–12
71	October 16, 2004	Washington, DC	Howard	42–35
72	October 15, 2005	Baltimore, MD	Morgan State	7–0
73	October 14, 2006	Washington, DC	Morgan State	18–12
74	October 13, 2007	Baltimore, MD	Morgan State	36–33
75	October 18, 2008	Washington, DC	Morgan State	31–30
76	October 15, 2009	Baltimore, MD	Morgan State	14–7
77	September 25, 2010	East Rutherford, NJ	Morgan State	20–3
78	September 24, 2011	East Rutherford, NJ	Morgan State	14–9
79	October 20, 2012	Washington, DC	Howard	21–20
80	October 26, 2013	Washington, DC	Howard	28–14
81	September 20, 2014	East Rutherford, NJ	Morgan State	38–35
82	September 26, 2015	Chicago, IL	Morgan State	21–13
83	September 24, 2016	Baltimore, MD	Morgan State	28–24
84	October 21, 2017	Washington, DC	Howard	39–14
85	October 20, 2018	Baltimore, MD	Howard	35–26
86	November 23, 2019	Washington, DC	Howard	20–15
87	October 8, 2021	Washington, DC	Howard	27–0
88	November 19, 2022	Baltimore, MD	Howard	35–6
89	November 18, 2023	Washington, DC	Howard	14–7
90	November 23, 2024	Baltimore, MD	Morgan State	35–21
91	October 25, 2025	Washington, DC	Howard	33–27^{OT}
92	October 24, 2026	Baltimore, MD	Howard	26–20^{OT}
Series: Morgan State leads 47–41–3
† Vacated by Howard

== See also ==
- List of NCAA college football rivalry games
