= 1927 Florida A&M Rattlers football team =

American college football season

1927 Florida A&M Rattlers football
- Conference: Southern Intercollegiate Athletic Conference
- Record: 5–3 (0–3 SIAC)
- Head coach: Jazz Byrd (2nd season)
- Captain: Blue

1927 Southern Intercollegiate Athletic Conference football standings
	Conf.					Overall
Team	W		L		T	W		L		T
Tuskegee $	7	–	0	–	1	9	–	0	–	1
Clark (GA)	4	–	1	–	2	5	–	1	–	2
Atlanta	3	–	1	–	3	5	–	1	–	3
Alabama State	3	–	1	–	2	6	–	2	–	2
Tennessee State	1	–	1	–	2	1	–	2	–	3
Morehouse	3	–	5	–	0	5	–	5	–	1
Fisk	1	–	2	–	2	3	–	2	–	3
Knoxville	1	–	3	–	1	3	–	5	–	1
Morris Brown	1	–	3	–	1	2	–	3	–	2
Talladega	1	–	5	–	0	3	–	5	–	0
Florida A&M	0	–	3	–	0	5	–	3	–	0
$ – Conference champion

The 1927 Florida A&M Rattlers football team represented represented Florida Agricultural and Mechanical College for Negroes (FAMC)—now known as Florida A&M University—as a member of the Southern Intercollegiate Athletic Conference (SIAC) during the 1927 college football season. Led by second-year head coach Jazz Byrd, the Rattlers compiled an overall record of 3–3 with a mark of 3–3 in conference play.

== Schedule ==
Date	Time	Opponent	Site	Result	Source
October 14		Americus Institute*	Tallahassee, FL	W 33–6	
October 22		at Tuskegee	Alumni Bowl; Tuskegee, AL	L 13–33	
October 28	3:30 p.m.	Georgia State*	Tallahassee, FL	W 18–0	
November 4		Florida Normal*	Tallahassee, FL	W 19–0	
November 11		Bethune–Cookman*	Tallahassee, FL	W 12–6	
November 18		at Edward Waters*	Jacksonville, FL	W 13–0	
December 2		at Alabama State	Paterson Field; Montgomery, AL	L 0–25	
		Morehouse		L 13–14	
*Non-conference game; All times are in Eastern time
