= 1949 Delaware State Hornets football team =

American college football season

1949 Delaware State Hornets football
- Conference: Colored Intercollegiate Athletic Association
- Record: 3–5–1 (3–5–1 CIAA)
- Head coach: Tom Conrad (6th season)

1949 Colored Intercollegiate Athletic Association football standings
	Conf.					Overall
Team	W		L		T	W		L		T
No. 1 Morgan State $	7	–	0	–	0	8	–	0	–	0
No. 2 West Virginia State	5	–	0	–	1	8	–	0	–	1
No. 6 North Carolina A&T	5	–	1	–	0	7	–	2	–	0
No. 6 Shaw	7	–	2	–	0	7	–	2	–	0
No. 25 St. Augustine's	5	–	2	–	0	6	–	2	–	0
No. 21 Virginia State	4	–	2	–	1	4	–	2	–	1
No. 22 Howard	6	–	3	–	0	6	–	3	–	0
No. 24 North Carolina College	3	–	4	–	0	5	–	4	–	0
No. 13 Hampton	3	–	4	–	0	5	–	4	–	0
Winston-Salem State	1	–	2	–	3	3	–	3	–	3
Delaware State	3	–	5	–	1	3	–	5	–	1
Johnson C. Smith	2	–	3	–	1	2	–	4	–	1
Lincoln (PA)	2	–	4	–	0	3	–	5	–	0
Bluefield State	1	–	5	–	1	2	–	5	–	1
Virginia Union	0	–	7	–	0	0	–	8	–	0
Saint Paul's (VA)	0	–	8	–	0	0	–	8	–	0
$ – Conference champion; Rankings from the Pittsburgh Courier

The 1949 Delaware State Hornets football team represented Delaware State College—now known as Delaware State University—as a member of the Colored Intercollegiate Athletic Association (CIAA) in the 1949 college football season. The Hornets compiled a 3–5–1 record under coach Tom Conrad.

== Schedule ==
Date	Opponent	Site	Result	Source
September 24	Winston-Salem State	Dover, DE	T 12–12	
October 1	at Morgan State	Hughes Stadium; Baltimore, MD	L 0–32	
October 8	Lincoln (PA)	Dover, DE	W 26–20	
October 15	at Johnson C. Smith	Charlotte, NC	L 6–10	
October 22	at North Carolina College	Durham, NC	L 0–27	
October 29	Saint Paul's (VA)	Dover, DE	W 40–0	
November 5	at Bluefield State	Bluefield, WV	W 13–11	
November 12	at Howard	Washington, DC	L 7–38	
November 19	St. Augustine's	Dover, DE	L 7–13	
