= 1937 Morgan Bears football team =

American college football season

1937 Morgan Bears football

Black college national champion CIAA champion
- Conference: Colored Intercollegiate Athletic Association
- Record: 7–0 (6–0 CIAA)
- Head coach: Edward P. Hurt (9th season)
- Captain: Sowell
- Home stadium: Morgan Stadium

1937 Colored Intercollegiate Athletic Association football standings
	Conf.					Overall
Team	W		L		T	W		L		T
Morgan $	6	–	0	–	0	7	–	0	–	0
Virginia State	7	–	1	–	0	8	–	1	–	0
Virginia Union	7	–	2	–	0	7	–	2	–	0
Johnson C. Smith	3	–	2	–	0	5	–	3	–	0
Lincoln (PA)	3	–	2	–	1	6	–	2	–	1
Shaw	4	–	3	–	0	4	–	3	–	0
Bluefield State	1	–	3	–	2	1	–	5	–	3
North Carolina A&T	2	–	4	–	2	2	–	4	–	3
North Carolina College	2	–	4	–	1	3	–	4	–	1
Hampton	2	–	5	–	0	3	–	6	–	0
Saint Paul (VA)	1	–	6	–	0	1	–	6	–	0
Howard	1	–	3	–	0	2	–	5	–	1
St. Augustine's	0	–	4	–	0	0	–	5	–	0
$ – Conference champion; Conference standings were based on the Dickinson System.

The 1937 Morgan Bears football team was an American football team that represented Morgan College—now known as Morgan State University—as a member of the Colored Intercollegiate Athletic Association (CIAA) during the 1937 college football season. In their ninth season under head coach Edward P. Hurt, the Bears compiled an overall record of 7–0 with a mark of 6–0 in conference play, wing the CIAA championship, which was determined by the Dickinson System. Morgan outscored opponents 168 to 19, and shut out the competition four times. The Bears were recognized as the 1937 black college national champion.

The school's newly constructed Morgan Stadium—now known as Hughes Stadium–was formally opened on October 17, 1937, in a dedication ceremony prior to the game against the Lincoln Lions.

== Schedule ==
Date	Time	Opponent	Site	Result	Attendance	Source
October 2		Miner Teachers*	Morgan Stadium; Baltimore, MD	W 20–0		
October 9		at Virginia Union	Mayo Island Ball Park; Richmond, VA	W 12–7	2,000	
October 16		Lincoln (PA)	Morgan Stadium; Baltimore, MD	W 19–6	5,000	
October 23		Bluefield State	Morgan Stadium; Baltimore, MD	W 31–0	1,500	
November 6		at North Carolina A&T	World War Memorial Stadium; Greensboro, NC	W 39–0	4,000	
November 13		at Hampton	Armstrong Field; Hampton, VA	W 26–0		
November 25	1:00 p.m.	Virginia State	Morgan Stadium; Baltimore, MD	W 21–6	12,000	
*Non-conference game; All times are in Eastern time
