= 1944 Delaware State Hornets football team =

American college football season

1944 Delaware State Hornets football
- Conference: Independent
- Record: 2–3
- Head coach: Tom Conrad (1st season)
- Captain: Henry Clay Aldridge

1944 Southern college football independents records
| | Conf. | | | Overall |
| Team | W | L | T | W | | L | | T |
|---|---|---|---|---|---|---|---|---|
| Virginia | | – | | 6 | – | 1 | – | 2 |
| No. 4 Navy | | – | | 6 | – | 3 | – | 0 |
| West Virginia | | – | | 5 | – | 3 | – | 1 |
| Millsaps | | – | | 3 | – | 6 | – | 0 |
| Delaware State | | – | | 2 | – | 3 | – | 0 |
| Tennessee Tech | | – | | 1 | – | 2 | – | 0 |
| North Texas Aggies | | – | | 2 | – | 6 | – | 0 |
| Miami (FL) | | – | | 1 | – | 7 | – | 1 |
| Sewanee | | – | | 0 | – | 3 | – | 1 |
| Howard (AL) | | – | | 0 | – | 5 | – | 0 |
Rankings from AP Poll

The 1944 Delaware State Hornets football team represented the State College for Colored Students—now known as Delaware State University—in the 1944 college football season as an independent. Led by first-year head coach Tom Conrad, the Hornets compiled a 2–3 record. The team's captain was Henry Clay Aldridge. Conrad had been hired the year before, but Delaware State did not field a football team in 1943.

== Schedule ==
| Date | Opponent | Site | Result | Attendance | Source |
|---|---|---|---|---|---|
| October 7 | at Morgan State | Hughes Stadium; Baltimore, MD | L 0–47 | 1,200 | |
| October 14 | at Lincoln (PA) | Lincoln, PA | L 0–19 | | |
| October 21 | Howard | | W 7–6 | | |
| November 4 | at Camp Dietrick | Maryland | Cancelled | | |
| November 4 | Howard | | W 18–0 | | |
| November 11 | at Aberdeen Proving Ground | Aberdeen, MD | L 19–27 | 4,500 | |
| November 18 | Camp Dietrick | Dover, DE | Cancelled | | |
