= 1944 Morgan State Bears football team =

American college football season

1944 Morgan State Bears football

Black college national champion CIAA champion
- Conference: Colored Intercollegiate Athletic Association
- Record: 6–1 (4–0 CIAA)
- Head coach: Edward P. Hurt (16th season)

1944 Colored Intercollegiate Athletic Association football standings
	Conf.					Overall
Team	W		L		T	W		L		T
Morgan State $	4	–	0	–	0	6	–	1	–	0
Virginia State	4	–	1	–	1	5	–	2	–	1
Johnson C. Smith	3	–	0	–	2	5	–	0	–	3
North Carolina A&T	1	–	3	–	1	4	–	4	–	1
Hampton	1	–	4	–	1	1	–	5	–	1
Howard	1	–	2	–	0	1	–	4	–	0
Lincoln (PA)	1	–	3	–	0	2	–	4	–	1
West Virginia State	0	–	2	–	1	1	–	4	–	1
$ – Conference champion; Conference standings were based on the Dickinson System.

The 1944 Morgan State Bears football team was an American football team that represented Morgan State College in the Colored Intercollegiate Athletic Association (CIAA) during the 1944 college football season. In their 16th season under head coach Edward P. Hurt, the Bears compiled a 6–1 record, won the CIAA championship, shut out five of seven opponents, and outscored all opponents by a total of 218 to 5. The Bears were recognized as the 1944 black college national champion.

== Schedule ==
Date	Opponent	Site	Result	Attendance	Source
October 7	Delaware State*	Morgan Stadium; Baltimore, MD	W 47–0	1,200	
October 14	Camp Mackall (black paratroopers)*	Morgan Stadium; Baltimore, MD	W 39–0		
October 28	Lincoln (PA)	Morgan Stadium; Baltimore, MD	W 58–0		
November 4	at North Carolina A&T	World War Memorial Stadium; Greensboro, NC	W 13–0		
November 11	vs. Tuskegee AAF*	Griffith Stadium; Washington, DC	L 0–2		
November 18	Hampton^{†}	Morgan Stadium; Baltimore, MD	W 55–0	3,000	
November 30	at Virginia State	Rogers Stadium; Ettrick, VA	W 6–3	10,000	
*Non-conference game; ^{†}Homecoming
