= Jazz Byrd =

American football player and coach (1905–1994)

Biographical details
- Born: June 28, 1905; Rochester, New York, U.S.
- Died: December 9, 1994 (aged 89); Wilmington, Delaware, U.S.

Playing career

Football
- 1922–1924: Lincoln (PA)

Basketball
- c. 1924: Lincoln (PA)

Track and field
- c. 1924: Lincoln (PA)
- Positions: Halfback (football); Guard (basketball)

Coaching career (HC unless noted)

Football
- 1926–1928: Florida A&M

Baseball
- 1927–1929: Florida A&M

Administrative career (AD unless noted)
- 1926–?: Florida A&M

Head coaching record
- Overall: 7–9–1 (football)

Franz Alfred "Jazz" Byrd (June 28, 1905 – December 9, 1994) was an American college football player and coach and Internal Revenue Service (IRS) employee. He served as the head football coach at Florida A&M University from 1926 to 1928. Byrd was also the athletic director at Florida A&M.

== Early life and college career ==
Bryd was born on June 28, 1905, in Rochester, New York, to William A. and Alice Asmond (Cloud) Bryd. He attended Lincoln High School in Jersey City, New Jersey.

Byrd played college football at Lincoln University in Chester County, Pennsylvania, helping the Lions to an 8–0–1 record in 1924 in which they outscored their opponents 306–3. He was revered by the sportswriters of the Black press of his era and beyond as the greatest open-field runner at Black colleges. His performances in the annual Thanksgiving Day games against the Howard Bison in 1922, 1923, and 1924 were widely covered and celebrated in the African-American press. Byrd was frequently referred to as the equal of Red Grange, the famed Illinois Fighting Illini halfback of the same era.

Byrd graduated from Lincoln University with a Bachelor of Arts degree in 1925, and earned a Master of Arts degree from Columbia University in 1926.

== College coaching career ==
Byrd served as the head football coach at Florida A&M University from 1926 to 1928.

== Later life ==
Byrd was employed by the Internal Revenue Service (IRS), before being named the first African American state income tax collector. He died at the age of 90, on December 9, 1994, at Riverside Extended Pavilion Care in Wilmington, Delaware.

== Head coaching record ==
=== Football ===
Year	Team	Overall	Conference	Standing	Bowl/playoffs
Florida A&M Rattlers (Southern Intercollegiate Athletic Conference) (1926–1929)
1926	Florida A&M	2–2	1–1	5th	
1927	Florida A&M	5–3	0–3	11th	
1928	Florida A&M	0–4–1	0–4	T–11th	
Florida A&M:		7–9–1	1–8		
Total:		7–9–1			
