= 1927 Tuskegee Golden Tigers football team =

American college football season

1927 Tuskegee Golden Tigers football

Black college national co-champion SIAC champion
- Conference: Southern Intercollegiate Athletic Conference
- Record: 9–0–1 (7–0–1 SIAC)
- Head coach: Cleve Abbott (5th season)
- Home stadium: Alumni Bowl

1927 Southern Intercollegiate Athletic Conference football standings
	Conf.					Overall
Team	W		L		T	W		L		T
Tuskegee $	7	–	0	–	1	9	–	0	–	1
Clark (GA)	4	–	1	–	2	5	–	1	–	2
Atlanta	3	–	1	–	3	5	–	1	–	3
Alabama State	3	–	1	–	2	6	–	2	–	2
Tennessee State	1	–	1	–	2	1	–	2	–	3
Morehouse	3	–	5	–	0	5	–	5	–	1
Fisk	1	–	2	–	2	3	–	2	–	3
Knoxville	1	–	3	–	1	3	–	5	–	1
Morris Brown	1	–	3	–	1	2	–	3	–	2
Talladega	1	–	5	–	0	3	–	5	–	0
Florida A&M	0	–	3	–	0	5	–	3	–	0
$ – Conference champion

The 1927 Tuskegee Golden Tigers football team represented the Tuskegee Normal and Industrial Institute—now known as Tuskegee University—as a member of the Southern Intercollegiate Athletic Conference (SIAC) during the 1927 college football season. In their fifth season under head coach Cleve Abbott, the Golden Tigers compiled an overall record of 9–0–1 with a mark of 7–0–1 in conference play, won the SIAC championship, and shut out seven of ten opponents. Tuskegee was recognized as the black college national champion and extended the program's unbeaten streak to 43 games, dating back to early in the 1923 season. The team played home games at the Alumni Bowl in Tuskegee, Alabama.

== Schedule ==
Date	Opponent	Site	Result	Attendance	Source
October 1	Straight*	Alumni Bowl; Tuskegee, AL	W 47–0		
October 7	Knoxville	Alumni Bowl; Tuskegee, AL	W 21–6		
October 15	Clark (GA)	Alumni Bowl; Tuskegee, AL	W 28–12		
October 22	Florida A&M	Alumni Bowl; Tuskegee, AL	W 33–13		
October 29	at Lincoln (PA)*	Baker Bowl; Philadelphia, PA	W 29–0	8,000–12,000	
November 5	Fisk	Tuskegee, AL	W 32–0		
November 19	at Morehouse	Atlanta, GA	W 14–0		
November 24	Talladega^{†}	Alumni Bowl; Tuskegee, AL	W 28–0		
December 2	at Atlanta	Spiller Field; Atlanta, GA	W 7–0		
December 10	at Alabama State	Crampton Bowl; Montgomery, AL (rivalry)	T 0–0	5,000	
*Non-conference game; ^{†}Homecoming
