= 1949 Morgan State Bears football team =

American college football season

1949 Morgan State Bears football

Black college national champion CIAA champion
- Conference: Colored Intercollegiate Athletic Association
- Record: 8–0 (7–0 CIAA)
- Head coach: Edward P. Hurt (20th season)
- Home stadium: Hughes Stadium

1949 Colored Intercollegiate Athletic Association football standings
	Conf.					Overall
Team	W		L		T	W		L		T
No. 1 Morgan State $	7	–	0	–	0	8	–	0	–	0
No. 2 West Virginia State	5	–	0	–	1	8	–	0	–	1
No. 6 North Carolina A&T	5	–	1	–	0	7	–	2	–	0
No. 6 Shaw	7	–	2	–	0	7	–	2	–	0
No. 25 St. Augustine's	5	–	2	–	0	6	–	2	–	0
No. 21 Virginia State	4	–	2	–	1	4	–	2	–	1
No. 22 Howard	6	–	3	–	0	6	–	3	–	0
No. 24 North Carolina College	3	–	4	–	0	5	–	4	–	0
No. 13 Hampton	3	–	4	–	0	5	–	4	–	0
Winston-Salem State	1	–	2	–	3	3	–	3	–	3
Delaware State	3	–	5	–	1	3	–	5	–	1
Johnson C. Smith	2	–	3	–	1	2	–	4	–	1
Lincoln (PA)	2	–	4	–	0	3	–	5	–	0
Bluefield State	1	–	5	–	1	2	–	5	–	1
Virginia Union	0	–	7	–	0	0	–	8	–	0
Saint Paul's (VA)	0	–	8	–	0	0	–	8	–	0
$ – Conference champion; Rankings from the Pittsburgh Courier

The 1949 Morgan State Bears football team was an American football team that represented Morgan State College in the Colored Intercollegiate Athletic Association (CIAA) during the 1949 college football season. In their 20th season under head coach Edward P. Hurt, the Bears compiled an 8–0 record, won the CIAA championship, shut out four of eight opponents, and outscored all opponents by a total of 226 to 33. The Bears were recognized by the Pittsburgh Courier, using the Dickinson Rating System, as the 1949 black college national champion.

== Schedule ==
Date	Opponent	Site	Result	Attendance	Source
October 1	Delaware State	Hughes Stadium; Baltimore, MD	W 32–0		
October 8	North Carolina College	Hughes Stadium; Baltimore, MD	W 20–7		
October 15	at Howard	Griffith Stadium; Washington, DC	W 39–0		
October 22	at Lincoln (PA)	Lincoln, PA	W 35–0		
October 29	North Carolina A&T	Morgan Stadium; Baltimore, MD	W 27–6		
November 5	vs. Wilberforce State*	Polo Grounds; New York, NY	W 14–13		
November 12	at Hampton	Hampton, VA	W 26–0	6,000	
November 24	Virginia State	Hughes Stadium; Baltimore, MD	W 34–7	> 12,500	
*Non-conference game
