= Lincoln University Stadium =

Football stadium in Lincoln University, Pennsylvania

Coordinates: 39.8069°N 75.9311°W

Lincoln University Stadium is an American football stadium owned and operated by Lincoln University. It has been the home of the Lincoln (Pennsylvania) Lions football team since opening in 2012.
