= 1926 Tuskegee Golden Tigers football team =

American college football season

1926 Tuskegee Golden Tigers football

Black college national co-champion SIAC champion
- Conference: Southern Intercollegiate Athletic Conference
- Record: 10–0 (8–0 SIAC)
- Head coach: Cleve Abbott (4th season)

1926 Southern Intercollegiate Athletic Conference football standings
	Conf.					Overall
Team	W		L		T	W		L		T
Tuskegee $	8	–	0	–	0	10	–	0	–	0
Morris Brown	2	–	0	–	1	3	–	2	–	1
Talladega	3	–	2	–	0	4	–	2	–	0
Atlanta	4	–	3	–	1	4	–	4	–	1
Florida A&M	1	–	1	–	0	2	–	2	–	0
Alabama State	2	–	3	–	0	6	–	3	–	0
Knoxville	2	–	3	–	0	5	–	3	–	0
Clark (GA)	2	–	3	–	0	2	–	3	–	1
Morehouse	1	–	4	–	1	2	–	5	–	1
Tennessee State	0	–	2	–	2	2	–	2	–	2
Fisk	0	–	4	–	1	2	–	5	–	1
$ – Conference champion

The 1926 Tuskegee Golden Tigers football team represented the Tuskegee Normal and Industrial Institute—now known as Tuskegee University—as a member of the Southern Intercollegiate Athletic Conference (SIAC) during the 1926 college football season. In their fourth season under head coach Cleve Abbott, Tuskegee compiled a 10–0 record, won the SIAC championship, and outscored all opponents by a total of 288 to 84. The team was recognized as the black college national champion.

== Schedule ==
Date	Opponent	Site	Result	Attendance	Source
October 2	Knoxville	Tuskegee, AL	W 24–3		
October 9	Florida A&M	Tuskegee, AL	W 73–6		
October 16	Clark (GA)	Tuskegee, AL	W 20–6		
October 23	Morehouse^{†}	Tuskegee, AL	W 28–6		
October 29	Lincoln (PA)*	Franklin Field; Philadelphia, PA	W 20–16	15,000	
November 6	at Alabama State	Cramton Bowl; Montgomery, AL (rivalry)	W 14–7		
November 13	at Fisk	Athletic Park; Nashville, TN	W 47–13		
November 20	at Talladega	Silsby Athletic Field; Talladega, AL	W 28–27		
November 25	Southern*	Athletic Bowl; Tuskegee, AL	W 20–0		
December 4	at Atlanta	Spiller Field; Atlanta, GA	W 14–0	6,000	
*Non-conference game; ^{†}Homecoming
