= John A. Shelburne =

American football player and coach (1894–1978)

Biographical details
- Born: September 26, 1894; Boston, Massachusetts
- Died: January 29, 1978 (aged 83); Boston, Massachusetts, U.S.

Playing career
- 1911–1913: Dartmouth
- 1922: Hammond Pros
- Position: Fullback

Coaching career (HC unless noted)
- 1921: Lincoln (PA)

Head coaching record
- Overall: 8–1

John Andrew Shelburne (September 26, 1894 – January 29, 1978) was an American football player and coach. He played college football at Dartmouth College, earning three letters from 1911 to 1913. Shelburne played professionally with the Hammond Pros of the National Football League (NFL) in 1922. He was one of only 13 African-Americans to play in the league prior to World War II. Shelburne served as the head football coach at Lincoln University in Pennsylvania in 1921, compiling a record of 8–1.

Shelburne was born in the West End of Boston. He graduated with honors from The English High School in 1914 and then attended Colby Academy in New London, New Hampshire before moving on to Dartmouth. Shelburne later worked at the Shaw House for 30 years as a social worker and was the director of the Breezy Meadows Camp in Holliston, Massachusetts. He died on January 29, 1978.

== Head coaching record ==
Year	Team	Overall	Conference	Standing	Bowl/playoffs
Lincoln Lions (Colored Intercollegiate Athletic Association) (1921)
1921	Lincoln	8–1	2–1	3rd	
Lincoln:		8–1	2–1		
Total:		8–1			
