= 1943 Morgan State Bears football team =

American college football season

1943 Morgan State Bears football

Black college national champion CIAA champion
- Conference: Colored Intercollegiate Athletic Association
- Record: 5–0 (2–0 CIAA)
- Head coach: Edward P. Hurt (15th season)
- Home stadium: Morgan Stadium

1943 Colored Intercollegiate Athletic Association football standings
	Conf.					Overall
Team	W		L		T	W		L		T
Morgan State $	2	–	0	–	0	5	–	0	–	0
North Carolina A&T	2	–	0	–	0	4	–	0	–	0
Virginia State	2	–	2	–	0	5	–	2	–	0
Hampton	2	–	2	–	0	2	–	4	–	0
Johnson C. Smith	1	–	3	–	0	5	–	4	–	0
West Virginia State	0	–	2	–	0	0	–	2	–	0
$ – Conference champion

The 1943 Morgan State Bears football team was an American football team that represented Morgan State College in the Colored Intercollegiate Athletic Association (CIAA) during the 1943 college football season. In their 15th season under head coach Edward P. Hurt, the Bears compiled a 5–0 record, won the CIAA championship, shut out five of seven opponents, did not allow their opponents to score any points, and outscored all opponents by a total of 166 to 0. The Bears were recognized as the 1943 black college national champion.

== Schedule ==
Date	Opponent	Site	Result	Attendance	Source
October 9	Camp Holabird, 1390th Service Unit*	Morgan Stadium; Baltimore, MD	W 25–0		
October 16	Wilberforce^{†}*	Morgan Stadium; Baltimore, MD	W 43–0		
November 5	Florida A&M*	Griffith Stadium; Washington, DC	W 50–0		
November 13	at Hampton	Hampton, VA	W 2–0		
November 25	Virginia State	Morgan Stadium; Baltimore, MD	W 46–0	9,500–11,000	
*Non-conference game; ^{†}Homecoming

== Roster ==
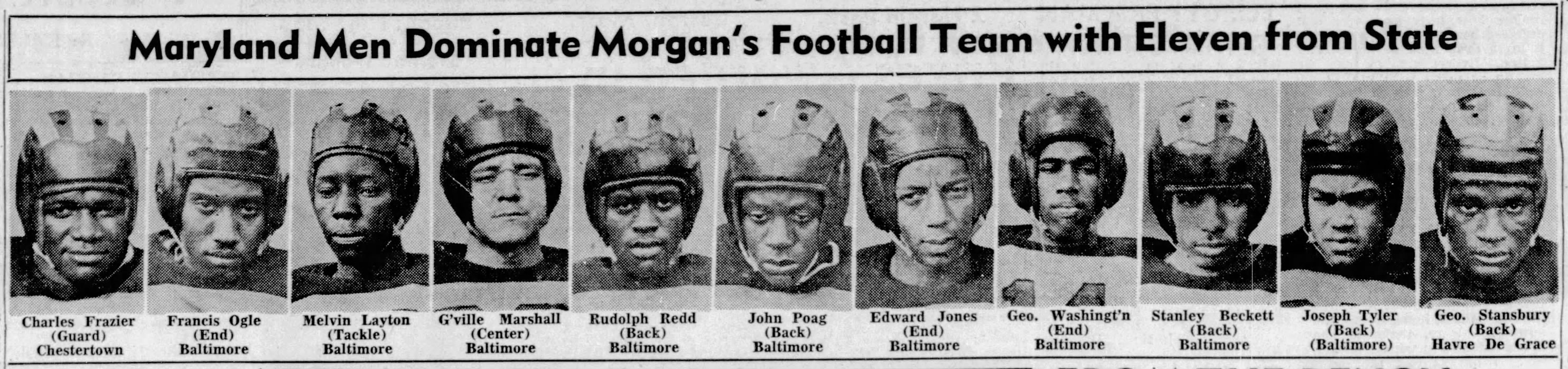
