= Edward P. Hurt =

American college coach (1900–1989)

Biographical details
- Born: February 12, 1900; Brookneal, Virginia, U.S.
- Died: March 24, 1989 (aged 89); Baltimore, Maryland, U.S.

Playing career

Football
- 1918: Lincoln (PA)
- 1919–1920: Howard
- Position: End

Coaching career (HC unless noted)

Football
- 1925–1928: Virginia Seminary
- 1929–1959: Morgan State

Basketball
- 1929–1947: Morgan State

Track
- 1929–1970: Morgan State

Administrative career (AD unless noted)
- 1958–1970: Morgan State

Head coaching record
- Overall: 188–64–24 (football)

Accomplishments and honors

Championships
- Football; 6 black college national (1933, 1937, 1943–1944, 1946, 1949); 14 CIAA (1930, 1932–1935, 1937, 1940–1944, 1946, 1949, 1956) Basketball; 4 CIAA Track; 18 CIAA

Edward Paulette Hurt (February 12, 1900 – March 24, 1989) was an American football, basketball, and track coach. He served the head football coach at Virginia Theological Seminary and College—now known as Virginia University of Lynchburg—in Lynchburg, Virginia from 1925 to 1928 and Morgan State College—now known as Morgan State University—in Baltimore, from 1929 to 1959. Hurt also had long tenures at the head basketball and head track coach at Morgan State. Across those three sports, his teams at Morgan State won 36 Central Intercollegiate Athletic Association (CIAA) championships and produced two Pro Football Hall of Famers and an Olympic gold medal winner. Hurt's Morgan State Bears football teams won six 6 black college football national championships and 14 CIAA titles. Hurt also served as the school's athletic director from 1958 to 1970. He played college football at Lincoln University in Pennsylvania and Howard University in Washington, D.C.

Hurt was inducted into the USA National Track and Field Hall of Fame in 1975 and the HBCU Hall of Fame in 1978.

== Early life ==
Hurt was born in Brookneal, Virginia. He attended Lincoln University and later graduated from Howard University with an A.B. degree in 1921. The slightly muscled, 150-pound Hurt played football at both schools and was named an All-American at Howard. Hurt also graduated from Columbia University with a M.S. degree in physical education. On August 13, 1922, Hurt married G. Beatrice Reid. The newlywed couple had to postpone honeymoon plans as Hurt had also landed a job in Lynchburg, Virginia to start his teaching career.

== Coaching career ==
Hurt's coaching career began at the Virginia Theological Seminary and College in Lynchburg, Virginia in 1921 where he was hired as a mathematics teacher and doubled as an assistant football coach. He became the head coach there in 1925 and served in that capacity until he moved to Baltimore in 1929. During his stay, his football teams posted a 15–11–4 record and his basketball team won two Central Intercollegiate Athletic Association (CIAA) championships.

=== Morgan football ===
Hurt took over the Morgan Bears football team in 1929. The next year his teams won the first of the 14 CIAA championships they would win with him at the helm. More importantly, Hurt built a program that allowed black athletes to showcase their talents where such a venue had been non-existent before. From 1931 to 1938 Hurt coached the Bears to a 54-game streak without a single loss. During his tenure, Morgan's football teams completed 11 seasons undefeated and, in the 1943 season, opponents failed to score a single point against the Bears. Hurt's success as a football coach was in part due to his mathematics background. He would often diagram plays on the backs of envelopes or milk cartons as the games unfolded. Discipline was also a key. During a halftime speech, when his team trailed by two touchdowns, Hurt angrily kick at a wooden crate upon which one of his big tackles was sitting. He kicked it so hard, his foot got stuck, but nobody on the team cracked a smile. Hurt is a member of the HBCU coaches Hall of Fame and two of his players, Len Ford and Rosey Brown, have been inducted into the Pro Football Hall of Fame. In 1952 Morgan named its then new $1 million gymnasium facility after him.

=== Track ===
From 1929 to 1970, Hurt also coached the track team at Morgan. By the 1950s the Morgan track team was drawing national and international attention. At the 1950 Penn Relays, Hurt's foursome, Sam LaBeach, Bob Tyler, Bill Brown and George Rhoden, won the mile relay in 3:13.6, which broke the Penn Relays' record that had stood for 56 years. Hurt's teams won 13 CIAA Track and Field Championships. Those teams also produced 8 NCAA champions, 12 AAU individual champions, 3 NCAA relay champions, 6 AAU relay champions, 1 Olympic gold-medalist (George Rhoden), 1 Olympic bronze-medalist (Josh Culbreath) and 11 individual or relay championships at the Penn Relays. Hurt was also on the coaching staffs at both the 1959 Pan American Games and the 1964 Olympic Games.

=== Basketball ===
Hurt coached the Morgan State University basketball team from 1929 to 1947, winning four CIAA championships. Three of those championships came consecutively in 1931, 1932 and 1933. From 1930 to 1947 Hurt coached the Morgan Bears to a 143–57 record, with the 1930, 1932, 1935 and 1945 teams going undefeated.

== Death and legacy ==
Hurt died on March 24, 1989, at his home on Montebello Terrace in Baltimore. His memorial service was held one week later on the campus of Morgan State University. His interment was completed at the Arbutus Memorial Park in southwest Baltimore County, Maryland. Hurt was survived by his wife Beatrice, one brother and three sisters. In addition to the Hurt Gymnasium, named is his honor in 1952, a scholarship fund was established in the name of Edward and Beatrice Hurt and the "Eddie Hurt Invitational track meet" is held annually at the university.

== Awards and honors ==
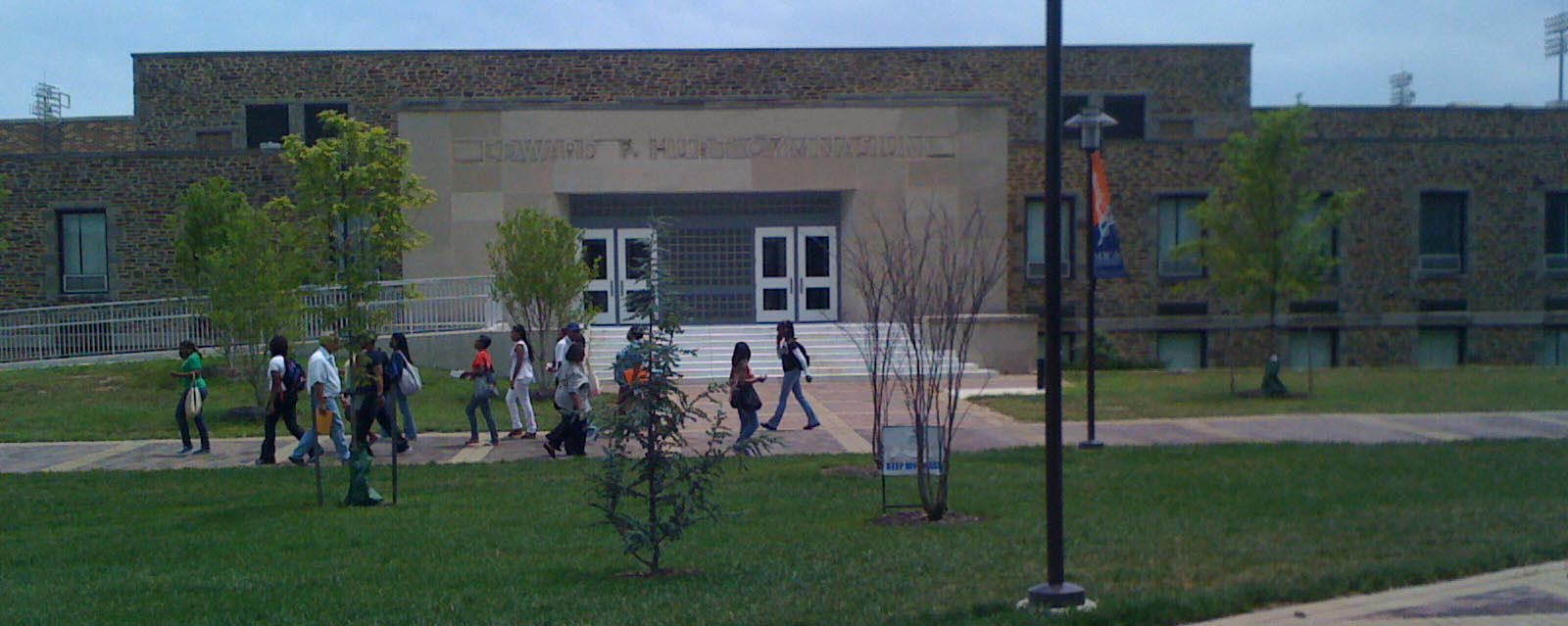
The Edward P. Hurt Gymnasium on the campus of Morgan State University

- 1949-named Coach of the year, 1949, Washington Pigskin Club
- 1950-named to the Outstanding Coaches of All-Time List by the University of Texas
- 1950-Coach of the Year, 1950 Track and Field News
- 1952-Morgan State University gymnasium (pictured) named in his honor
- 1959-U.S Coach, Pan American Games
- Member, United States Olympic Committee 1960-1972
- 1964-awarded United States Olympic Committee service award
- 1964-Coach, U.S Olympic track team
- 1972-elected to the Morgan State University Athletic Hall of Fame
- 1975-inducted into the USA National Track and Field Hall of Fame in
- 1978-inducted into the HBCU Hall of Fame
- 2004-inducted into the U.S. Track & Field and Cross Country Coaches Association (USTFCCCA) Hall of Fame

== Head coaching record ==
=== Football ===
Year	Team	Overall	Conference	Standing	Bowl/playoffs
Virginia Seminary Dragons (Colored Intercollegiate Athletic Association) (1925–1928)
1925	Virginia Seminary	4–1–2	3–1–1	2nd	
1926	Virginia Seminary	3–4–1	3–3–1	4th	
1927	Virginia Seminary	3–4–1	3–2–1	4th	
1928	Virginia Seminary	3–3–2	3–2–2	3rd	
Virginia Seminary:		13–12–6	12–8–5		
Morgan Bears (Independent) (1929)
1929	Morgan	2–5–1			
Morgan / Morgan State Bears (Colored/Central Intercollegiate Athletic Association) (1930–1959)
1930	Morgan	8–1	7–1	1st	
1931	Morgan	5–2	4–2	3rd	
1932	Morgan	7–0–1	6–0–1	1st	
1933	Morgan	9–0	8–0	1st	
1934	Morgan	5–0–3	5–0–2	1st	
1935	Morgan	8–0	7–0	1st	
1936	Morgan	6–0–2	5–0–2	2nd	
1937	Morgan	7–0	6–0	1st	
1938	Morgan	5–1–1	5–1–1	2nd	
1939	Morgan State	3–3–2	2–3–2	8th	
1940	Morgan State	7–0–1	6–0–1	1st	
1941	Morgan State	6–1	6–1	1st	
1942	Morgan State	6–1–1	5–1–1	1st	
1943	Morgan State	5–0	2–0	1st	
1944	Morgan State	6–1	4–0	1st	
1945	Morgan State	5–2	5–2	T–5th	
1946	Morgan State	8–0	7–0	1st	
1947	Morgan State	5–2–1	5–2–1	5th	
1948	Morgan State	5–3	5–3	5th	
1949	Morgan State	8–0	7–0	1st	
1950	Morgan State	6–0–2	5–0–2	3rd	
1951	Morgan State	3–5	3–4	10th	
1952	Morgan State	6–4	5–3	5th	
1953	Morgan State	6–2	5–1	3rd	
1954	Morgan State	6–3	4–2	8th	
1955	Morgan State	6–2	5–1	5th	
1956	Morgan State	5–2–1	5–0–1	T–1st	
1957	Morgan State	5–3–1	4–2–1	4th	
1958	Morgan State	5–3	5–2	3rd	
1959	Morgan State	1–6–1	1–6	T–17th	
Morgan / Morgan State:		175–52–18	149–37–15		
Total:		188–64–24			
National championship Conference title Conference division title or championship game berth
