= Artis P. Graves =

American football coach and educator (1907–1977)

Biographical details
- Born: September 23, 1907
- Died: August 11, 1977 (aged 69); Greensboro, North Carolina, U.S.

Playing career
- 1928–1930: Bluefield State
- Position: Fullback

Coaching career (HC unless noted)
- 1931–1934: Morristown
- 1935: Shorter (AR)
- 1936–1939: Morris Brown (assistant)
- 1940: Morris Brown
- 1941–1942: Morris Brown (assistant)
- 1944–1949: Morris Brown

Head coaching record
- Bowls: 2–0

Accomplishments and honors

Championships
- 1 black college national (1940); 1 SIAC (1940)

Artis P. Graves (September 23, 1907 – August 11, 1977) was an American college football coach and educator. He served as head football coach at Morris Brown College in Atlanta, Georgia, in 1940 and again from 1944 to 1949. His 1940 Morris Brown Wolverines football team compiled a record of 10–1, winning the Southern Intercollegiate Athletic Conference (SIAC) title and a black college football national championship.

Graves played football at Bluefield State College in Bluefield, West Virginia, where was a three-time Negro All-American. He later earned a PhD from the University of Iowa. Graves also coached athletics at Morristown College in Morristown, Tennessee and Shorter College in North Little Rock, Arkansas.

In 1950, Graves accepted a position as chairman of the department of biology at North Carolina A&T State University in Greensboro, North Carolina. He served in that role until his retirement June 1977. Graves worked as a football and basketball official for the Central Intercollegiate Athletic Association for 25 years.

Graves died on August 11, 1977, at a hospital in Greensboro, following a short illness.

== Head coaching record ==
Year	Team	Overall	Conference	Standing	Bowl/playoffs
Morris Brown Wolverines (Southern Intercollegiate Athletic Conference) (1940)
1940	Morris Brown	9–1	6–1	1st	W Peach Blossom Classic, W Vulcan
Morris Brown Wolverines (Southern Intercollegiate Athletic Conference) (1944–1949)
1944	Morris Brown	3–4	2–4	5th	
1945	Morris Brown	5–2–1	3–2	3rd	
1946	Morris Brown	4–4–1	3–2–1	5th	
1947	Morris Brown	3–7–1	2–4–1	T–9th	
1948	Morris Brown	3–6	3–4	9th	
1949	Morris Brown	6–3–1	4–2–1	4th	
Morris Brown:		33–27–4	23–19–3		
Total:					
National championship Conference title Conference division title or championship game berth
