= Kienus Boulware =

American football coach

Current position
- Title: Defensive coordinator & linebackers coach
- Team: Allen
- Conference: SIAC

Playing career
- 1993–1994: North Carolina
- Position: Linebacker

Coaching career (HC unless noted)
- 1995–1996: North Carolina (student assistant)
- 1997–1998: Livingstone (LB)
- 1999–2002: North Carolina Central (LB)
- 2003: North Carolina Central (DL)
- 2004: North Carolina Central (LB)
- 2005–2008: Shaw (DC)
- 2009–2013: Winston-Salem State (DC)
- 2014–2018: Winston-Salem State
- 2022–2023: Alabama A&M (DC/LB)
- 2024–present: Allen (DC/LB)

Head coaching record
- Overall: 35–18
- Tournaments: 0–1 (NCAA D-II playoffs)

Accomplishments and honors

Championships
- 1 black college national (2016); 2 CIAA (2015–2016); 3 CIAA Southern Division (2014–2016)

Kienus P. Boulware is an American college football coach. He is the defensive coordinator and linebackers coach for Allen University, positions he has held since 2024. Boulware served as the head football coach at Winston-Salem State University in Winston-Salem, North Carolina from 2014 to 2018, compiling a record of 35–18. He was fired from his post at Winston-Salem State in April 2019 following an altercation between two of his players. Boulware played college football at the University of North Carolina at Chapel Hill as a linebacker.

== Head coaching record ==
Year	Team	Overall	Conference	Standing	Bowl/playoffs	AFCA^{#}
Winston-Salem State Rams (Central Intercollegiate Athletic Association) (2014–2018)
2014	Winston-Salem State	9–2	7–0	1st (Southern)		24
2015	Winston-Salem State	6–5	5–2	1st (Southern)		
2016	Winston-Salem State	9–3	7–0	1st (Southern)	L NCAA Division II First Round	
2017	Winston-Salem State	6–4	4–3	3rd (Southern)		
2018	Winston-Salem State	5–4	4–2	T–2nd (Southern)		
Winston-Salem State:		35–18	27–7			
Total:		35–18				
National championship Conference title Conference division title or championship game berth
