= Tom Conrad =

American athlete, sports coach, athletics administrator (c. 1910 – 1986)

Biographical details
- Born: c. 1910; Roselle Park, New Jersey, U.S.
- Died: December 7, 1986; New Brunswick, New Jersey, U.S.

Playing career

Football
- 1930–1934: Morgan
- late 1930s: New York Brown Bombers

Basketball
- early 1930s: Morgan

Baseball
- 1930: Newark Browns
- early 1930s: Morgan

Track and field
- early 1930s: Morgan
- Positions: Halfback (football); Center, forward, guard (basketball); Pitcher (baseball); 4 × 440 yards relay, javelin throw (track and field)

Coaching career (HC unless noted)

Football
- 1943–1949: Delaware State
- 1950–1969: Winston-Salem State

Basketball
- c. 1943–1950: Delaware State

Baseball
- c. 1944–1950: Delaware State

Administrative career (AD unless noted)
- c. 1943–1950: Delaware State

Head coaching record
- Overall: 98–104–10 (football)
- Bowls: 1–0

Thomas R. "Tank" Conrad (c. 1910 – December 7, 1986) was an American football, basketball, and baseball player and coach. He served as the head football coach at Delaware State College (now known as Delaware State University) from 1943 to 1949 and Winston-Salem State College (now known as Winston-Salem State University) from 1950 to 1969. Jackson is the longest tenured head coach in the history of the Winston-Salem State Rams football program and its all-time leader in wins. He coached Delaware State's only bowl game win, a 7–6 Flower Bowl victory over Florida N&I. Conrad also coached basketball and baseball at Delaware State, and served as the school's athletic director.

Conrad was born in Roselle Park, New Jersey, where he graduated, in 1930, from Roselle Park High School. He then attended Morgan College—now known as Morgan State University—where he competed in football, basketball, baseball, and track and field.

After graduating from Morgan, Conrad played professional football for the New York Brown Bombers. He also played professional baseball for the Newark Browns of Negro league baseball. Conrad died at the age of 76, on December 7, 1986, at Middlesex General University Hospital in New Brunswick, New Jersey.

== Head coaching record ==
=== Football ===
Year	Team	Overall	Conference	Standing	Bowl/playoffs
Delaware State Hornets (Independent) (1944)
1944	Delaware State	2–3			
Delaware State Hornets (Colored Intercollegiate Athletic Association) (1945–1949)
1945	Delaware State	4–3	3–3	8th	
1946	Delaware State	4–4	3–4	9th	W Flower Bowl
1947	Delaware State	4–4	4–3	8th	
1948	Delaware State	4–5	4–4	11th	
1949	Delaware State	3–5–1	3–5–1	11th	
Delaware State:		21–24–1	17–19–1		
Winston-Salem State Rams (Central Intercollegiate Athletic Association) (1950–1969)
1950	Winston-Salem State	4–1–3	3–1–2		
1951	Winston-Salem State	4–4	4–2	8th	
1952	Winston-Salem State	4–4	2–4	11th	
1953	Winston-Salem State	3–5–1	2–4	T–12th	
1954	Winston-Salem State	3–5	2–5	T–11th	
1955	Winston-Salem State	7–2	5–1	T–5th	
1956	Winston-Salem State	4–4–1	3–3–1	T–9th	
1957	Winston-Salem State	5–4	5–3	10th	
1958	Winston-Salem State	3–5–1	3–5	13th	
1959	Winston-Salem State	6–2	5–2	5th	
1960	Winston-Salem State	6–2	5–1	4th	
1961	Winston-Salem State	6–1–1	6–1	3rd	
1962	Winston-Salem State	3–5	2–5	T–12th	
1963	Winston-Salem State	4–3–1	3–3–1	9th	
1964	Winston-Salem State	4–4	4–3	8th	
1965	Winston-Salem State	2–7	2–6	16th	
1966	Winston-Salem State	2–5	2–5	15th	
1967	Winston-Salem State	3–5	3–4	T–10th	
1968	Winston-Salem State	3–5–1	2–5–1	14th	
1969	Winston-Salem State	2–7	1–7	15th	
Winston-Salem State:		78–80–9	64–70–5		
Total:		99–104–10			
