= 1922 Tennessee State football team =

American college football season

1922 Tennessee State football
- Conference: Independent
- Record: 3–1–1
- Head coach: Buck Hunt (1st season)
- Home stadium: Athletic Park

1922 Southern college football independents records
	Conf.			Overall
Team	W	L	T	W		L		T
West Virginia		–		10	–	0	–	1
Tennessee Docs		–		7	–	0	–	1
Western Kentucky State Normal		–		9	–	1	–	0
Trinity (NC)		–		7	–	2	–	1
VMI		–		7	–	2	–	0
Abilene Christian		–		6	–	2	–	0
Richmond		–		6	–	2	–	1
West Tennessee State Normal		–		5	–	2	–	3
Navy		–		5	–	2	–	0
Tennessee State		–		3	–	1	–	1
Delaware		–		6	–	3	–	0
Stetson		–		4	–	2	–	0
William & Mary		–		6	–	3	–	0
Georgetown		–		6	–	3	–	1
Marion		–		5	–	4	–	1
East Tennessee		–		5	–	4	–	0
Marshall		–		5	–	4	–	0
Roanoke		–		5	–	4	–	0
Texas Mines		–		5	–	4	–	0
Loyola (LA)		–		4	–	3	–	1
Spring Hill		–		4	–	4	–	0
Sam Houston Normal		–		3	–	4	–	0
Wake Forest		–		3	–	5	–	2
Davidson		–		2	–	6	–	2
Catholic University		–		2	–	6	–	0
George Washington		–		2	–	6	–	0
Middle Tennessee State Normal		–		2	–	6	–	0
Mississippi Normal		–		2	–	6	–	0
Louisville		–		2	–	7	–	0
Birmingham–Southern		–		1	–	6	–	1
Erskine		–		0	–	8	–	0

The 1922 Tennessee State football team represented the Tennessee Agricultural & Industrial State Normal School for Negroes—now known as Tennessee State University—an independent during the 1923 college football season. Led by Buck Hunt in his first and only season as head coach, Tennessee State compiled a record of 3–1–1.

== Schedule ==
Date	Time	Opponent	Site	Result	Attendance	Source
October 21		Fisk	Nashville, TN	W 7–6	3,500	
October 27		Pearl High School	Nashville, TN	W		
November 4		at Knoxville	Knoxville, TN	Cancelled?		
November 11		at Morris Brown	Atlanta, GA	T 0–0		
November 13	2:30 p.m.	at Howard High School	Warner Park; Chattanooga, TN	W 52–6		
November 18		Alabama State	Nashville, TN	Cancelled?		
November 25		Roger Williams (TN)	Nashville, TN	Cancelled?		
November 30	3:30 p.m.	Kentucky State	Nashville, TN	L 2–7		
All times are in Central time
