= Steel Bowl =

Steel Bowl may refer to:

- Steel Bowl (game), an American former college football postseason game, known after its first playing as the Vulcan Bowl
- Steel Bowl tournament, an American former college basketball tournament, associated with the "City Game" rivalry between the University of Pittsburgh Panthers and the Duquesne University Dukes
