= 1940 Morris Brown Wolverines football team =

American college football season

1940 Morris Brown Wolverines football

Black college national champion SIAC champion

Peach Blossom Classic, W 28–6 vs. Kentucky State Steel Bowl, W 19–3 vs. Wilberforce
- Conference: Southern Intercollegiate Athletic Conference
- Record: 9–1 (6–1 SIAC)
- Head coach: Artis P. Graves (1st season)
- Home stadium: Ponce de Leon Park

1940 Southern Intercollegiate Athletic Conference football standings
	Conf.					Overall
Team	W		L		T	W		L		T
Morris Brown $	6	–	1	–	0	9	–	1	–	0
Alabama State	5	–	2	–	0	7	–	2	–	0
Florida A&M	5	–	1	–	0	6	–	1	–	3
Xavier (LA)	3	–	3	–	0	4	–	4	–	0
Tuskegee	4	–	3	–	0	5	–	4	–	0
Clark (GA)	4	–	2	–	0	6	–	3	–	0
Lane	2	–	2	–	1	5	–	3	–	1
Knoxville	2	–	3	–	1	?	–	?	–	?
Morehouse	1	–	5	–	1	1	–	6	–	1
Benedict	1	–	4	–	1	?	–	?	–	?
South Carolina State	1	–	5	–	0	3	–	6	–	0
LeMoyne *	2	–	1	–	0	?	–	?	–	?
Talladega *	1	–	2	–	0	?	–	?	–	?
Fisk *	0	–	3	–	0	?	–	?	–	?
$ – Conference champion; * Conference standings were based on the Dickinson System. Teams that played less than five conference games did not figure in final standings.

The 1940 Morris Brown Wolverines football team was an American football team that represented Morris Brown College in the Southern Intercollegiate Athletic Conference (SIAC) during the 1940 college football season. In their first season under head coach Artis P. Graves, the Wolverines compiled an overall record of 9–1 record with a mark of 6–1 in conference play, winning the SIAC title. Morris Brown defeated Kentucky State in the Peach Blossom Bowl and Wilberforce in the Steel Bowl. This was recognized as the black college national champion for 1940.

Key players included fullback John "Big Train" Moody and halfbacks "Switch Engine" Jenkins and Joe Mitchell. Moody and guard Willie Griffin, one of Morris Brown's "Gold Dust Twins," were selected by The Pittsburgh Courier as first-team players on its 1940 All-America team. Shepard was selected as a second-team guard, and Jenkins was selected as a third-team back.

== Schedule ==
Date	Opponent	Site	Result	Attendance	Source
September 28	at Allen*	Columbia, SC	W 34–0		
October 5	at Tuskegee	Abbott Memorial Alumni Stadium; Tuskegee, AL	W 10–0		
October 19	Morehouse	Ponce de Leon Park; Atlanta, GA	W 16–0		
October 26	Florida A&M^{†}	Ponce de Leon Park; Atlanta, GA	L 13–20		
November 2	Alabama State	Atlanta, GA	W 21–3		
November 8	Xavier (LA)	Atlanta, GA	W 25–0		
November 16	at Knoxville	Knoxville, TN	W 46–0		
November 21	Clark (GA)	Ponce de Leon Park; Atlanta, GA	W 20–7		
December 7	Kentucky State*	Atlanta, GA (Peach Blossom Bowl)	W 28–6	< 1,500	
January 1, 1941	vs. Wilberforce*	Birmingham, AL (Steel Bowl)	W 19–3	8,000	
*Non-conference game; ^{†}Homecoming
