= Lincoln Lions (rugby union) =

Rugby union club in England

The Lincoln Lions Rugby Football Club is a rugby union club based in Lincoln, England. The club was founded in 1882.

== See also ==
- East Midlands
- Rugby union in England
