= 1927 Tennessee State Tigers football team =

American college football season

1927 Tennessee State Tigers football
- Conference: Southern Intercollegiate Athletic Conference
- Record: 1–2–3 (1–1–2 SIAC)
- Head coach: Caesar Felton Gayles (1st season)
- Captain: Jackson
- Home stadium: Sulphur Dell

1927 Southern Intercollegiate Athletic Conference football standings
	Conf.					Overall
Team	W		L		T	W		L		T
Tuskegee $	7	–	0	–	1	9	–	0	–	1
Clark (GA)	4	–	1	–	2	5	–	1	–	2
Atlanta	3	–	1	–	3	5	–	1	–	3
Alabama State	3	–	1	–	2	6	–	2	–	2
Tennessee State	1	–	1	–	2	1	–	2	–	3
Morehouse	3	–	5	–	0	5	–	5	–	1
Fisk	1	–	2	–	2	3	–	2	–	3
Knoxville	1	–	3	–	1	3	–	5	–	1
Morris Brown	1	–	3	–	1	2	–	3	–	2
Talladega	1	–	5	–	0	3	–	5	–	0
Florida A&M	0	–	3	–	0	3	–	3	–	0
$ – Conference champion

The 1927 Tennessee State Tigers football team represented Tennessee Agricultural & Industrial State College—now known as Tennessee State University—as a member of the Southern Intercollegiate Athletic Conference (SIAC) during the 1927 college football season. Led by Caesar Felton Gayles in his first and only season as head coach, the Tigers compiled an overall record of 1–2–3 with a mark of 1–1–2 in conference play, placing fifth in the SIAC.

== Schedule ==
Date	Time	Opponent	Site	Result	Source
October 22		Simmons (KY)*	Nashville, TN	T 0–0	
November 5		Morris Brown	Nashville, TN	L 9–10	
November 12	1:30 p.m.	at Morehouse	Morehouse athletic field; Atlanta, GA	W 20–13	
November 19		at Wilberforce*	Wilberforce, OH	L 0–18	
November 24		Fisk	Sulphur Dell; Nashville, TN	T 0–0	
December 3	2:00 p.m.	at Knoxville	Knoxville College gridiron; Knoxville, TN	T 0–0	
*Non-conference game; All times are in Central time
