= 1926 Tennessee State football team =

American college football season

1926 Tennessee State football
- Conference: Southern Intercollegiate Athletic Conference
- Record: 2–2–2 (0–2–2 SIAC)
- Head coach: George Davenport (2nd season)

1926 Southern Intercollegiate Athletic Conference football standings
	Conf.					Overall
Team	W		L		T	W		L		T
Tuskegee $	8	–	0	–	0	10	–	0	–	0
Morris Brown	2	–	0	–	1	3	–	2	–	1
Talladega	3	–	2	–	0	4	–	2	–	0
Atlanta	4	–	3	–	1	4	–	4	–	1
Florida A&M	1	–	1	–	0	2	–	2	–	0
Alabama State	2	–	3	–	0	6	–	3	–	0
Knoxville	2	–	3	–	0	5	–	3	–	0
Clark (GA)	2	–	3	–	0	2	–	3	–	1
Morehouse	1	–	4	–	1	2	–	5	–	1
Tennessee State	0	–	2	–	2	2	–	2	–	2
Fisk	0	–	4	–	1	2	–	5	–	1
$ – Conference champion

The 1926 Tennessee State football team represented Tennessee Agricultural & Industrial State Normal College—now known as Tennessee State University—as a member of the Southern Intercollegiate Athletic Conference (SIAC) during the 1926 college football season. Led by George Davenport in his second and final season as head coach, Tennessee State compiled an overall record of 2–2–2 with a mark of 0–2–2 in conference play.

== Schedule ==
Date	Time	Opponent	Site	Result	Attendance	Source
October 22		at Roger Williams (TN)*	Nashville, TN	W 10–0		
October 30	2:30 p.m.	at Knoxville	Knoxville College gridiron; Knoxville, TN	L 0–21	2,500	
November 6	3:30 p.m.	at Morris Brown	Morris Brown athletic field; Atlanta, GA	L 0–6		
November 13	1:00 p.m.	Morehouse	Tennessee State campus; Nashville, TN	T 0–0		
November 25	3:00 p.m.	vs. Rust*	Lewis Park; Memphis, TN	W 26–6		
December 4	2:00 p.m.	at Fisk	Fisk gridiron; Nashville, TN	T 13–13		
*Non-conference game; All times are in Central time
