= Joe E. Suggs =

American football coach

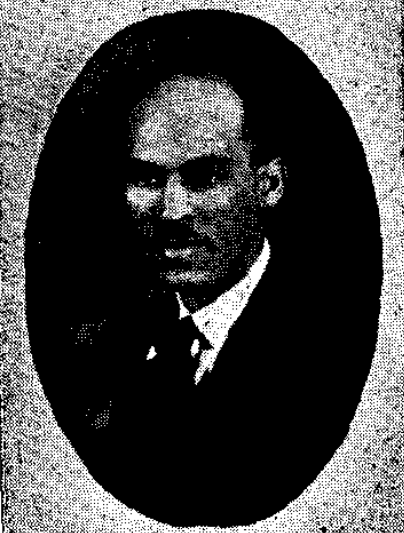
- Suggs pictured in The Radio 1926, Tennessee State yearbook

Playing career
- c. 1910: Fisk

Coaching career (HC unless noted)
- 1924: Tennessee State

Head coaching record
- Overall: 4–1–1

Joseph E. Suggs was an American college football coach and educator. He was served as the head football coach at Tennessee A&I State Normal School for Negroes—now known as Tennessee State University—in Nashville, Tennessee, for one season, in 1924. He had starred in football at Fisk University, and had graduated from the coaching school at the University of Illinois before being hired by Tennessee State. Suggs earned a Bachelor of Arts degree from Fisk and a Master of Science degree from Illinois. He also pursued graduate work at the University of Chicago. In addition to coaching, Suggs was the director of physical education at Tennessee State. In 1926, he returned to Fisk as director of physical education.

== Head coaching record ==
Year	Team	Overall	Conference	Standing	Bowl/playoffs
Tennessee State (Independent) (1924)
1924	Tennessee State	4–1–1			
Tennessee State:		4–1–1			
Total:		4–1–1			
