= Buck Hunt =

American football coach, educator (1891–1927)

Biographical details
- Born: September 10, 1891; Annapolis, Maryland, U.S.
- Died: December 21, 1928 (aged 37); Baltimore, Maryland, U.S.

Playing career

Football
- c. 1910: Howard

Basketball
- c. 1910: Howard

Baseball
- c. 1910: Howard

Track and field
- c. 1910: Howard

Coaching career (HC unless noted)

Football
- 1916: Virginia Seminary
- 1919–1921: Virginia Seminary
- 1922: Tennessee State
- 1923: Roger Williams (TN)

Administrative career (AD unless noted)
- 1919–1922: Virginia Seminary

John Russell "Buck" Hunt (September 10, 1891 – December 21, 1927) was an American college football coach and educator. He served as the head football coach at Virginia Theological Seminary and College (now known as the Virginia University of Lynchburg) in 1916 and from 1919 to 1921, Tennessee A&I State Normal School for Negroes (now known as Tennessee State University) in 1922, and Roger Williams University in Nashville, Tennessee, in 1923.

Hunt was born on September 10, 1891, in Annapolis, Maryland, to Josiah and Melvina Hunt. His family moved to Washington, D.C. during his youth. Hunt attended Howard University, where he competed in football, basketball, baseball, and track before graduating in 1912.

Hunt went to Virginia Seminary in 1912 as professor of English. During World War I, he served as a first lieutenant in Company B, 368th Infantry Regiment, 92nd Infantry Division. After the war, he returned to Virginia Seminary as athletic director and coach. In 1922, he moved on to Tennessee State as football coach. The following year, he went to Roger Williams as athletic coach.

Hunt died on December 21, 1927, in Baltimore, following a illness lasting several months. He was buried at Arlington National Cemetery.

== Head coaching record ==
Year	Team	Overall	Conference	Standing	Bowl/playoffs
Virginia Seminary Dragons (Independent) (1916)
1916	Virginia Seminary	0–2			
Virginia Seminary Dragons (Independent) (1919–1920)
1919	Virginia Seminary	0–2			
1920	Virginia Seminary	2–2			
Virginia Seminary Dragons (Colored Intercollegiate Athletic Association) (1921)
1921	Virginia Seminary	4–4	0–3	7th	
Virginia Seminary:		6–10	0–3		
Tennessee State (Independent) (1922)
1922	Tennessee State	3–1–1			
Tennessee State:		3–1–1			
Roger Williams (Independent) (1923)
1923	Roger Williams				
Roger Williams:					
Total:					
