= George Davenport (American football) =

American football coach

Coaching career (HC unless noted)
- 1925–1926: Tennessee State

Head coaching record
- Overall: 6–3–2

George Davenport was an American college football coach. He served as the head football coach at Tennessee Agricultural & Industrial State Normal College—now known as Tennessee State University—in Nashville, Tennessee, from 1925 to 1926.

== Head coaching record ==
Year	Team	Overall	Conference	Standing	Bowl/playoffs
Tennessee State (Independent) (1925)
1925	Tennessee State	4–1			
Tennessee State (Southern Intercollegiate Athletic Conference) (1926)
1926	Tennessee State	2–2–2	0–2–2		
Tennessee State:		6–3–2	0–2–2		
Total:		6–3–2			
