= Morgan State Bears football =

American collegiate football team representing Morgan State University

2026 Morgan State Bears football team
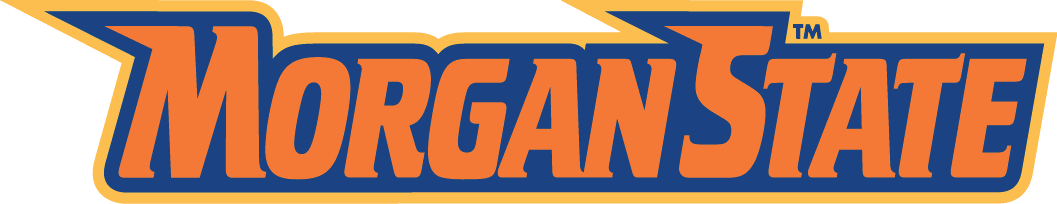
- First season: 1898; 128 years ago
- Head coach: Damon Wilson; 5th season, 18–27 (.400)
- Location: Baltimore, Maryland
- Stadium: Hughes Stadium (capacity: 10,001)
- Conference: MEAC
- Colors: Blue and orange
- All-time record: 460–478–35 (.491)
- Bowl record: 2–3 (.400)

Black college national championships
- 1933, 1937, 1943, 1944, 1946, 1949, 1967

Conference championships
- CIAA: 1930, 1932, 1933, 1934, 1935, 1937, 1940, 1941, 1942, 1943, 1944, 1946, 1949, 1956, 1962, 1965, 1966, 1967, 1968 MEAC: 1971, 1976, 1979, 2014
- Rivalries: Howard (rivalry); Towson (rivalry)
- Mascot: Bears
- Website: morganstatebears.com

The Morgan State Bears football team competes in American football on behalf of Morgan State University. The Bears compete in the NCAA Division I Football Championship Subdivision, currently as a member of the Mid-Eastern Athletic Conference (MEAC). The Bears play their home games at Hughes Stadium, a 10,000-seat facility in Baltimore.

Morgan State began playing football in 1898, 31 years after the school was founded. The team's all-time record is 405 wins, 379 losses and 38 ties. 173 of those wins came between 1929 and 1959 when Edward P. Hurt was the head coach and the Bears won 14 Central Intercollegiate Athletic Association (CIAA) championships. Earl Banks won four CIAA championships during the 1960s and an additional championship in 1971 after Morgan entered the MEAC. The Bears have won three MEAC Championships (1976, 1979 and 2014).

== History ==
=== Eddie Hurt era (1929–1959) ===
Coach Edward P. Hurt took over the Morgan Bears football team in 1929. The next year his teams won the first of the 14 CIAA championships they would win with him at the helm. More importantly, Hurt, and his assistant coach Talmadge L. Hill, built a program that allowed black athletes to show case their talents where such a venue had been non-existent before. From 1931 to 1938, Hurt coached the Bears to a 54-game win streak without a single loss. During his tenure, Morgan's football teams completed 11 seasons undefeated and, in the 1943 season, opponents failed to score a single point against the Bears. Hurt is a member of the HBCU coaches Hall of Fame and in 1952 Morgan named its new $1 million gymnasium facility after him.

=== Earl "Papa Bear" Banks era (1960–1973) ===
Earl Banks succeeded Hurt and took Morgan football to the next level. Banks was the Head coach from 1960 to 1973. He coached the Bears to a 31-game winning streak, three unbeaten regular seasons, four CIAA titles, a MEAC championship, and four bowl games. Twice during his tenure, Morgan led the nation in total defense. 35 of Bank's players went on to play in the NFL, including Pro Football Hall of Famers Leroy Kelly and Willie Lanier; two more players played professional ball in the CFL. Banks was inducted into five sports Halls of Fame including the College Football Hall of Fame in 1992.

=== Modern era (1974–present) ===
Only two coaches have had winning records at Morgan since the departure of Banks at the end of the 1973 season. The Bears had suffered 23 straight seasons with a losing record until the arrival of former coach Donald Hill-Eley whose first team had a 7–5 record in the 2002 season. Lee Hull was named head coach on January 8, 2014 and his first team would also finish with a 7–5 record, would win a share of the MEAC championship and played in the NCAA Division I FCS Playoffs where they would lose to Richmond in the first round.

== Classifications ==
- 1956–1972: NCAA College Division
- 1973–1985: NCAA Division II
- 1986–present: NCAA Division I–AA/FCS

== Conference memberships ==
- 1899–1928: Independent
- 1929–1970: Central Intercollegiate Athletic Association
- 1971–1979: Mid-Eastern Athletic Conference
- 1980–1983: Independent
- 1984–present: Mid-Eastern Athletic Conference

== Historic first ==
- 1976, Morgan State played Grambling State in the first American college football game in Asia. Morgan State lost 42–16 in Tokyo, Japan.

== Championships ==
=== National ===
Morgan State claims seven Black college football national championships.

Year	Championship	Coach	Overall record	Conference
1933	Black College National Champions	Edward P. Hurt	9–0	CIAA
1937	Black College National Champions	Edward P. Hurt	7–0	CIAA
1943	Black College National Champions	Edward P. Hurt	5–0	CIAA
1944	Black College National Champions	Edward P. Hurt	6–1	CIAA
1946	Black College National co-champions	Edward P. Hurt	8–0	CIAA
1949	Black College National co-champions	Edward P. Hurt	8–0	CIAA
1967	Black College National co-champions	Earl Banks	8–0	CIAA

=== Conference championships ===
Morgan State has won 23 conference championships.

Year	Conference	Coach	Overall record
1930	CIAA	Edward P. Hurt	8–1
1932	CIAA	Edward P. Hurt	7–0–1
1933	CIAA	Edward P. Hurt	9–0
1934	CIAA	Edward P. Hurt	5–0–3
1935	CIAA	Edward P. Hurt	8–0
1937	CIAA	Edward P. Hurt	7–0
1940	CIAA	Edward P. Hurt	7–0–1
1941	CIAA	Edward P. Hurt	6–1
1942	CIAA	Edward P. Hurt	6–1–1
1943	CIAA	Edward P. Hurt	5–0
1944	CIAA	Edward P. Hurt	6–1
1946	CIAA	Edward P. Hurt	8–0
1949	CIAA	Edward P. Hurt	8–0
1956	CIAA	Edward P. Hurt	5–2–1
1962	CIAA	Earl Banks	8–1
1965	CIAA	Earl Banks	9–0
1966	CIAA	Earl Banks	9–0
1967	CIAA	Earl Banks	8–0
1968	CIAA	Earl Banks	8–1
1971	Mid-Eastern Athletic Conference	Earl Banks	6–4–1
1976†	Mid-Eastern Athletic Conference	Henry Lattimore	6–4
1979	Mid-Eastern Athletic Conference	Clarence Thomas	9–2
2014†	Mid-Eastern Athletic Conference	Lee Hull	7–6

† co-champions

== Rivals ==
Morgan State and Howard participate in the Howard–Morgan State football rivalry.

Towson and Morgan State share a rivalry called The Battle for Greater Baltimore.

== Playoff appearances ==
=== NCAA Division I-AA/FCS ===
The Bears have made one appearance in the Division I-AA/FCS playoffs, with a combined record of 0–1.

Year	Round	Opponent	Result
2014	First Round	Richmond	L, 24–46

=== NCAA Division II ===
The Bears made one appearance in the Division II playoffs, with a combined record of 0–1.

Year	Round	Opponent	Result
1979	Quarterfinals	Alabama A&M	L, 7–27

== Head coaches ==
Coach	Tenure	Wins	Losses	Ties
Dr. John Camper	1920–1923	3	14	1
Jim F. Law	1924–1925	6	3	2
Dr. Charles R. Drew	1926–1927	8	2	2
Bill Taylor	1928	5	2	3
Eddie Hurt	1929–1959	173	54	18
Earl Banks	1960–1973	95	30	2
Nat Taylor	1974–1975	9	10	1
Henry Lattimore	1976–1977	10	10	1
Clarence Thomas	1978–1980	17	15	1
Thomas Morris	1981	4	5	0
Nat Taylor	1982	4	7	0
James Phillips	1983–1984	2	18	0
Jesse Thomas	1985–1987	2	27	0
Edmund Wyche	1988–1990	6	26	1
Ricky Diggs	1991–1995	10	45	0
Stump Mitchell	1996–1998	8	24	1
Stanley Mitchell	1999–2001	5	27	0
Donald Hill-Eley	2002–2013	59	76	0
Lee Hull	2014–2016	11	12	0
Fred Farrier	2016–2017	4	18	0
Ernest T. Jones	2018	4	7	0
Tyrone Wheatley	2019–2021 (Note: Due to COVID-19, Morgan State suspended the fall 2020 football season.)	5	18	0
Damon Wilson	2022–present	18	27	0

== Notable alumni ==
Fifty three former Morgan players have gone on to play professional football. Thirty nine players went to the NFL, eight to the CFL, three to the WFL and one each to the AAFC, the Arena Football League and the AIFA. At least one player has gone to the NFL every decade since 1950 from Morgan State.

Former Morgan Bears Len Ford, Leroy Kelly, Willie Lanier and Rosey Brown are members of the Pro Football Hall of Fame in Canton, Ohio.

Professional players
Player	Position	League	Team	Years	Ref
1940s
Elmore Harris	RB	AAFC	Brooklyn Dodgers	1947	
1950s
Len Ford ^{†}	DE	NFL	Cleveland Browns	1950	
Charlie Robinson	G	NFL	Pittsburgh Steelers	1951	
Rosey Brown ^{†}	OT	NFL	New York Giants	1952	
1960s
Oliver Dobbins	DB	NFL	Buffalo Bills	1964	
Leroy Kelly ^{†}	RB	NFL	Cleveland Browns	1964	
Willie Lanier ^{†}	LB	NFL	Kansas City Chiefs	1966	
Tom Carr	DT	NFL	New Orleans Saints	1967	
Carlton Dabney	DT	NFL	Atlanta Falcons	1968	
Daryl Johnson	CB	NFL	Boston Patriots	1968	
Alvin Mitchell	CB	NFL	Cleveland Browns	1968	
Jeff Queen	LB	NFL	San Diego Chargers	1969	
Clarence Scott	CB	NFL	Boston Patriots	1968	
Bob Wade	CB	NFL	Pittsburgh Steelers	1969	
George Nock	RB	NFL	New York Jets	1969	
John "Frenchy" Fuqua	RB	NFL	Pittsburgh Steelers	1969	
1970s
Raymond Chester	TE	NFL	Oakland Raiders	1970	
Ed Hayes	S	NFL	Philadelphia Eagles	1970	
Mark Washington	CB	NFL	Dallas Cowboys	1970	
Willie Germany	S	NFL	Atlanta Falcons	1972	
Ara "Sonny" Person	TE	NFL	St. Louis Cardinals	1971	
John Sykes	RB	NFL	San Diego Chargers	1972	
John "Tiny" Andrews	DE	NFL	Miami Dolphins	1972	
Maurice Tyler	CB	NFL	Buffalo Bills	1972	
Ron Mayo	TE	NFL	Houston Oilers	1973	
Stan Cherry	LB	NFL	Baltimore Colts	1973	
Greg Latta	TE	NFL	Chicago Bears	1975	
Mike Collier	RB	NFL	Pittsburgh Steelers	1975	
Bobby Hammond	RB	NFL	New York Giants	1976	
Tim Baylor	S	NFL	Baltimore Colts	1976	
1980s
Elvis Franks	DE	NFL	Cleveland Browns	1980	
Mike Holston	WR	NFL	Houston Oilers	1981	
Cornell Gowdy	CB	NFL	Dallas Cowboys	1986	
1990s
Kelvin Moore	S	NFL	Cincinnati Bengals	1998	
2000s
Willie Jones	DT	NFL	Kansas City Chiefs	2001	
Visanthe Shiancoe	TE	NFL	Minnesota Vikings	2003	
Cliff Johnson	DB	NFL	Detroit Lions	2005	
Cliff Louis	OT	NFL	Cleveland Browns	2007	
Chad Simpson	RB	NFL	Indianapolis Colts	2007	
2010s
Joshua Miles	OT	NFL	Arizona Cardinals	2019	
2020s

Legend
^{†} Member of the Pro Football Hall of Fame

== Future non-conference opponents ==
Announced schedules as of July 28, 2026

2026	2027	2028	2029	2030	2031
at North Carolina A&T	vs Alabama State (Atlanta, GA); MEAC/SWAC Challenge	Sacred Heart	at Syracuse	at Towson	Towson
at Arizona State	at Richmond	at Towson	Towson	Hampton	
Virginia–Lynchburg	at Sacred Heart	at Delaware			
at Towson	Towson	North Carolina A&T			
at Villanova	Tennessee State				
Robert Morris	at Robert Morris				
at Tennessee State	Virginia–Lynchburg				
