= Lincoln (Pennsylvania) Lions =

Lincoln Lions
- University: Lincoln University
- Conference: CIAA (primary); ECC (baseball, women's soccer)
- NCAA: Division II
- Athletic director: Harry Stinson III
- Location: Oxford, Pennsylvania
- Varsity teams: 12 (5 men's, 6 women's, 1 co-ed)
- Football stadium: LU Athletics Stadium
- Basketball arena: Manuel Rivero Gymnasium
- Baseball stadium: LU Baseball Complex
- Softball stadium: LU Softball Complex
- Soccer stadium: LU Athletics Stadium
- Nickname: Lions
- Colors: Blue and orange
- Website: lulions.com
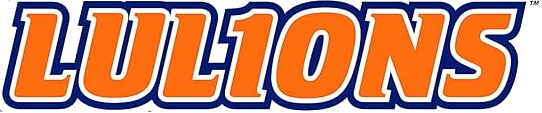

The Lincoln Lions are the athletic teams that represent Lincoln University, located near Oxford in Chester County, Pennsylvania, in NCAA Division II intercollegiate sports.

The Lions compete as full members of the Central Intercollegiate Athletic Association. LU was an original member of the CIAA between 1912 and 1980 and then rejoined in 2008.

== History ==
In the 1986-87 academic year the Lincoln University Athletic Dept. was integrated with the first white athlete. David Sherman was recruited to play basketball from Coatesville High School in Coatesville, Pa. David Sherman played both basketball and baseball for the Lincoln Lions lettering in both sports. He was also a Scholastic All-American for that school year with a 3.85GPA. He was nominated for the award by his basketball coach Bobby Byers.

The success of the Track and Field program led to the creation of the co-ed athletic fellowship of Track Phi Track Social Fellowship, Inc. at Lincoln in 1979. Some of the requirements include being an All-American and/or striving to become an All-American, meeting and exceeding academic requirements in your major, and participation in Lincoln's Track & Field program for four years.

== Sports sponsored ==
Men's sports	Women's sports
Baseball	Basketball
Basketball	Cross country
Cross country	Sortball
Football	Soccer
Track and field	Track and field
	Volleyball

== National championships ==
=== Team ===
Sport	Association	Division	Year	Opponent/Runner-up	Score
Men's indoor track and field (7)	NCAA	Division III	1990	MIT	36–30.5
Men's indoor track and field (7)	NCAA	Division III	1995	Albany (NY)	56–32
Men's indoor track and field (7)	NCAA	Division III	1996	Mount Union	58–42
Men's indoor track and field (7)	NCAA	Division III	1998	Mount Union	53–48
Men's indoor track and field (7)	NCAA	Division III	1999	Wisconsin–Oshkosh	60–37
Men's indoor track and field (7)	NCAA	Division III	2000	North Central (IL)	59–40
Men's indoor track and field (7)	NCAA	Division III	2007	Wisconsin–La Crosse	59–48
Women's indoor track and field (1)	NCAA	Division III	1993	Wisconsin–La Crosse	36–27

== Individual programs ==
=== Football ===
On April 11, 2006, Lincoln's board of trustees voted to revive the football program, and establish Marching & Pep Bands. The University has petitioned for membership in the CIAA, of which Lincoln was a founding member. Lincoln will be moving from the NCAA's Division III to Division II. A club football team is scheduled for the 2008 followed with a full Division II schedule in 2009. Fielding its first football team in 48 years on August 30, 2008, Lincoln defeated George Mason University, 34–7. Lincoln lost its final nine games of 2008, but improved to 3–7 in 2009.

=== Men's basketball ===
The men's basketball team achieved a 46–12 record from 2004 to 2006. The 2005–06 season witnessed Lincoln's first national basketball ranking, led by "All American", D3 Hoops & Basketball News "National Player of the Year" Kyle Myrick. ESPN dubbed him D3's "Most Exciting Player". The Lions made the sweet sixteen for the first time in school history.

On December 2, 2006, Lincoln's basketball team set 5 Division III records in a 201–78 victory over Ohio State Marion. Records included points scored in a half, and points scored in a game, as well as the NCAA record for margin of victory.
