= NCAA Division II bowl games =

American college football bowl games

NCAA Division II Football Bowl Games
- NCAA Division II logo
- In operation: 1997–present
- Number of teams: varies
- Most bowl appearances: Tuskegee (SIAC) 10, Missouri Western (MIAA) 9
- Most bowl championships: Tuskegee (SIAC) 7, Missouri Western (MIAA) 6

NCAA Division II bowl games are American college football bowl games played annually among some of the highest-ranking NCAA Division II football teams not invited to participate in the NCAA Division II Football Championship playoffs. The games are officially recognized by the NCAA. They are held in December, and are most commonly scheduled on the first Saturday of the month, three weeks after the final games of the Division II football regular season.

Like the bowl games of the NCAA Division I Football Bowl Subdivision (FBS) that are not integrated into the College Football Playoff, Division II bowl games are purely "consolation" games. In most cases, conferences supply teams to specific bowls by prior arrangement. Unlike Division I bowl games, they offer no financial "payout" to the participating schools, are typically played in small venues before small crowds, and must be sustained by the efforts of local sponsors and chambers of commerce. As a result, Division II bowl games have been fewer in number and mostly short-lived. Ten bowls have been contested since 1997, with at least one (and as many as four) being played in any given year. Teams from ten conferences (plus independents) have participated.

== Background ==
In 1956 the NCAA College Division was created to serve the athletic needs of the association's smaller member institutions. The division held separate championships in several sports, starting with a basketball tournament at the end of the 1956–57 season. In lieu of a football championship, the unofficial national champion was determined by polls conducted by the wire services, as it was for the major college football programs. Eventually the division held four regional bowl games from 1964 through 1972, intended to crown the small-college champions of different parts of the country, The regional College Division championships included the Camellia Bowl for the West; the Grantland Rice Bowl for the Mideast; the Tangerine Bowl (1964–67), then the Boardwalk Bowl (1968–72) for the East; and the Pecan Bowl (1964–70), then the Pioneer Bowl (1971–72) for the Midwest.

In 1969, the NCAA created two more postseason games, the Amos Alonzo Stagg Bowl and the Knute Rockne Bowl, "for its College Division II schools, those 100-plus smallest schools in the NCAA." Eligible schools were divided into an East Region (the Northeast and Middle Atlantic states) and West Region (the rest of the country), with the Stagg Bowl serving as the West championship and the Rockne Bowl as the East championship. At least for the sport of football, this accommodation foreshadowed the decision to subdivide the College Division four years later.

After the reorganization of the NCAA into the present three divisions (I, II, and III) in 1973, Division II and Division III began to conduct postseason football playoffs. The Amos Alonzo Stagg Bowl became the championship game for Division III, and the remaining active College Division bowls were incorporated into the Division II playoffs. The Boardwalk Bowl (1973) served as a quarterfinal game; the Grantland Rice Bowl (1973–77), Pioneer Bowl (1973–75), and Knute Rockne Bowl (1976–77) served as the semifinal games; and the Camellia Bowl (1973–75) and Pioneer Bowl (1976–77) were venues for the championship game. During the same years, the newly-established Bicentennial Bowl (1976) and Gold Bowl (1977) served as postseason games for historically black colleges and universities (HBCUs) in Division II that did not qualify for the playoffs.

With the creation of Division I-AA (today's FCS) in 1978, the Pioneer Bowl became the I-AA title game. That autumn, the Division II championship was referred to as a "bowl" in some press accounts but remained unnamed, and the practice of designating the semifinal games as bowls came to an end. The Zia Bowl hosted the championship in 1979 and 1980, then the Palm Bowl (former venue for the NAIA Football National Championship) hosted it from 1981 through 1985. The Palm Bowl folded after the 1985 contest, and subsequent NCAA Division II football championship games were not designated as bowls. For the next dozen years after the demise of the Palm Bowl, no Division II teams met in a postseason game that carried a bowl designation.

== History (1997–present) ==
The current system of Division II bowl games has its origins in 1997, when a new Pioneer Bowl (unrelated to the former game) was created as a contest between teams from the division's two conferences of HBCUs, the Southern Intercollegiate Athletic Conference (SIAC) and the Central Intercollegiate Athletic Association. The game moved among five southeastern US cities: first Atlanta, GA, then Mobile, AL, Columbia, SC, Charlotte, NC, and finally Columbus, GA. It was held annually until 2012, except for cancellations in 2002 and 2008.

In 2000, the Mineral Water Bowl became the era's second Division II bowl. The game, held in Excelsior Springs, MO, dated from 1948 (with interruptions) and had been a junior college postseason contest from 1992 to 1999. It included teams from the Northern Sun Intercollegiate Conference (NSIC) and Mid-America Intercollegiate Athletics Association (MIAA), an arrangement that continued through 2017, when it gave way to a matchup between an NSIC team and an at-large team. The game was cancelled in 2020 due to the COVID-19 pandemic and was never played again.

Another former junior college postseason game, the Dixie Rotary Bowl in St. George, UT, became a Division II bowl in 2006, but only lasted three years. From 2006 through 2008, the Rocky Mountain Athletic Conference (RMAC) sent a team to the game; in 2007 and 2008, teams from the Great Northwest Athletic Conference (GNAC) provided the opponent.

From 2009 through 2012, the short-lived Kanza Bowl matched teams from the MIAA and the Lone Star Conference (LSC). The game was held in Topeka, KS.

From 2012 through 2018 (except for a cancellation in 2013), the C.H.A.M.P.S. Heart of Texas Bowl matched a team from the LSC against an at-large team. The game was held in Copperas Cove, TX (2012–17), then Waco, TX (2018). It was played on a double bill with a junior college postseason game which remained active after 2018.

From 2013 through 2023, the Live United Texarkana Bowl featured a team from the Great American Conference (GAC), initially against an opponent from either the MIAA or the LSC. From 2017 until its cancellation, the game was a GAC-MIAA matchup. It was held in Texarkana, AR.

The Heritage Bowl, founded in 2017 as the Corsicana Bowl, matches teams chosen from among the MIAA, LSC, and GAC. The game is held in Corsicana, TX.

The Albanese Candy Bowl, founded in 2019 as America's Crossroads Bowl, matches teams from the Great Lakes Valley Conference (GLVC) and the Great Midwest Athletic Conference (G-MAC). The game has been held in Hobart, IN, except for the 2023 contest, which was played in Hammond, IN.

The Florida Beach Bowl, founded in 2023, revived the matchup of the defunct Pioneer Bowl by featuring HBCU teams from the CIAA and SIAC, but only lasted one season. The game was held in Fort Lauderdale, FL.

The First Americans Bowl, founded in 2025, pairs two teams with strong Native American connections. The game is held in Tahlequah, OK.

No Division II bowls were played in 2020 due to the COVID-19 pandemic.

Since the onset of the current Division II bowl system, Tuskegee has the most appearances (ten) and most victories (seven) of any team, all in the Pioneer Bowl, largely because its traditional Turkey Day Classic against Alabama State extended its regular season to Thanksgiving Day, precluding participation in the Division II playoffs. Tuskegee thus was unique in choosing to go to a bowl game in several years when it would have qualified for the playoffs, if not for its Thanksgiving Day game. The most notable examples came in 2000 and again in 2007, when Tuskegee capped perfect 12–0 seasons with victories in the Pioneer Bowl.

On the conference level, teams from the MIAA have registered the greatest success, participating in the most bowls (5), the most games (37), and posting the most victories (27). The conference's most impressive year was 2017, when it sent teams to each of the four bowls then in existence and won all four games. Among MIAA teams, Missouri Western has the most bowl appearances (nine) and most victories (six), in both cases second only to Tuskegee overall.

Thus far, teams from the remaining seven Division II football-playing conferences—the Northeast-10 Conference (NE10), Pennsylvania State Athletic Conference (PSAC), South Atlantic Conference (SAC), Gulf South Conference (GSC), Great Lakes Intercollegiate Athletic Conference (GLIAC), Mountain East Conference (MEC), and Conference Carolinas (CC)—have not participated in Division II bowl games.

== Timeline of bowl games ==
game played game cancelled

== Conference bowl records (1997–present) ==
Bowl game	CIAA	GAC	GLVC	GMAC	GNAC+	LSC	MIAA	NSIC	RMAC	SIAC	Ind
Pioneer Bowl	5–9									9–5	
Mineral Water Bowl			1–0				12–6	7–13			0–1
Dixie Rotary Bowl					2–0				1–2		0–1
Kanza Bowl						2–2	2–2				
Heart of Texas Bowl		1–2				1–4	3–0				1–0
Live United Texarkana Bowl		3–7				1–1	6–2				
Heritage Bowl		2–4				2–4	4–0				
Albanese Candy Bowl			5–1	1–5							
Florida Beach Bowl	0–1									1–0	
First Americans Bowl		0–1									1–0
Totals (through 2024)	5–10	6–14	6–1	1–5	2–0	6–11	27–10	7–13	1–2	10–5	2–2

+ The GNAC no longer sponsors football

== Division II teams in non-Division II bowls ==
The champions of the CIAA and Mid-Eastern Athletic Conference (MEAC) met in the Bicentennial Bowl in 1976 and the Gold Bowl in 1977, at a time when both conferences competed in Division II. After the MEAC reclassified to Division I-AA (today's FCS), the Gold Bowl was played three more times (1978 through 1980), making the game unique in matching teams from two different NCAA divisions. Virginia Union (1978) was the only CIAA team to win the Gold Bowl before the game was discontinued.

Division II teams with dual membership in the National Christian Collegiate Athletic Association (NCCAA) played in five of the NCCAA's 24 Victory Bowl games contested between 1997 and 2022, usually against teams from the NAIA with dual NCCAA membership. North Greenville appeared in more Victory Bowls than any other Division II team, losing the 2003 game and winning in 2006, 2010, and 2014, all while competing as a Division II independent. Azusa Pacific of the GNAC won the 2013 Victory Bowl. The 2014 game, matching North Greenville against Shorter of the GSC, was the only one to feature two Division II teams.

== Division II all-star games ==
Two Division II postseason all-star games carried the "bowl" designation. The Snow Bowl was held in the Fargodome in Fargo, North Dakota from 1994 to 2000. In 2001 the game relocated to Kingsville, Texas, and was rebranded as the Cactus Bowl. It continued through the 2011 season (except for 2007, when the game was not held). The Snow Bowl and Cactus Bowl both featured an East-West format.
