= List of NCAA Division II football championship appearances by team =

The list of team that have participated in the NCAA Division II Football Championship playoffs. The NCAA Division II Football Championship playoffs began with eight teams in 1973 and expanded to include 16 teams in 1988, 24 teams in 2004, 28 teams in 2015, and 32 teams in 2025.

== Current Division II members ==
=== Qualified teams ===
- Teams in **bold** participated in the 2026 postseason.
- Updated before the 2026 playoffs.

NCAA Division II Football Championship appearances
Team	Appearances	First	Last	Wins	Losses	Total games	Pct.
Albany State Golden Rams	15	1993	2025	5	15	20	.250
American International Yellow Jackets	2	2008	2013	0	2	2	.000
Angelo State Rams	9	1987	2024	7	9	16	.438
Arkansas Tech Wonder Boys	3	1999	2009	2	3	5	.500
Ashland Eagles	10	1986	2025	5	10	15	.333
**Assumption Greyhounds**	6	2015	2026	4	5	9	.444
**Augustana (SD) Vikings**	9	1988	2026	2	8	10	.200
Bemidji State Beavers	4	2021	2024	5	4	9	.556
**Benedict Tigers**	4	2022	2026	1	3	4	.250
Bentley Falcons	4	2003	2025	0	4	4	.000
Bloomsburg Huskies	11	1985	2014	9	11	20	.450
Bowie State Bulldogs	6	1988	2021	3	6	9	.333
**California (PA) Vulcans**	10	2007	2026	10	9	19	.526
**Carson–Newman Eagles**	18	1993	2026	20	17	37	.541
Catawba Indians	7	1999	2015	5	7	12	.417
Central Missouri Mules	5	2002	2023	4	5	9	.444
Central Oklahoma Bronchos	5	1996	2024	4	5	9	.444
**Central State Marauders**	5	1983	2026	3	4	7	.429
**Central Washington Wildcats**	10	2002	2026	5	9	14	.357
Chadron State Eagles	9	1996	2025	3	9	12	.250
**Charleston Golden Eagles**	4	2015	2026	1	3	4	.250
Clarion Golden Eagles	1	1996	1996	2	1	3	.667
Colorado Mesa Mavericks	4	2000	2016	1	4	5	.200
Colorado Mines Orediggers	9	2004	2023	12	9	21	.571
**CSU Pueblo ThunderWolves**	12	2011	2026	9	9	18	.500
Concord (WV) Mountain Lions	2	2011	2014	2	2	4	.500
Davenport Panthers	1	2022	2022	0	1	1	.000
Delta State Statesmen	11	1998	2023	17	10	27	.630
**East Stroudsburg Warriors**	7	1991	2026	4	6	10	.400
Edinboro Fighting Scots	8	1989	2009	3	8	11	.273
**Edward Waters Tigers**	1	2026	2026	0	0	0	–
Elizabeth City State Vikings	3	1981	2011	0	3	3	.000
Emporia State Hornets	4	2003	2016	3	3	6	.500
Fairmont State Falcons	1	2016	2016	0	1	1	.000
**Fayetteville State Broncos**	5	2002	2026	0	4	4	.000
**Ferris State Bulldogs**	17	1992	2026	35	12	47	.745
**Findlay Oilers**	4	2017	2026	1	3	4	.250
Fort Hays State Tigers	4	1993	2018	0	4	4	.000
Fort Valley State Wildcats	6	1982	2012	1	6	7	.143
Frostburg State Bobcats	1	2025	2025	2	1	3	.667
Glenville State Pioneers	1	1997	1997	0	1	1	.000
**Grand Valley State Lakers**	24	1989	2026	39	18	57	.684
**Harding Bisons**	9	2012	2026	16	9	25	.640
Henderson State Reddies	4	2012	2023	1	4	5	.200
Hillsdale Chargers	3	2009	2018	2	3	5	.400
Indiana (PA) Crimson Hawks	20	1987	2025	22	20	42	.524
Indianapolis Greyhounds	10	2012	2025	3	10	13	.231
Johnson C. Smith Golden Bulls	1	2025	2025	0	1	1	.000
**Kentucky State Thorobreds**	2	2025	2026	0	1	1	.000
**Kutztown Golden Bears**	9	2010	2026	9	8	17	.529
Lenoir–Rhyne Bears	8	2012	2024	11	8	19	.579
Mars Hill Lions	1	2011	2011	0	1	1	.000
**Michigan Tech Huskies**	3	2004	2026	0	2	2	.000
**Midwestern State Mustangs**	9	2004	2026	2	8	10	.200
Miles Golden Bears	3	2012	2024	1	3	4	.250
Millersville Marauders	3	2002	2005	2	3	5	.400
Minnesota Duluth Bulldogs	13	2002	2025	14	11	25	.560
**Minnesota State–Mankato Mavericks**	17	1987	2026	20	16	36	.556
Missouri Southern Lions	1	1993	1993	0	1	1	.000
Missouri Western Griffons	4	2006	2012	2	4	6	.333
Morehouse Maroon Tigers	1	2010	2010	0	1	1	.000
Nebraska–Kearney Lopers	5	2002	2021	2	5	7	.286
**Newberry Wolves**	7	2006	2026	5	6	11	.455
**UNC Pembroke Braves**	4	2009	2026	1	3	4	.250
North Greenville Trailblazers	3	2011	2025	4	3	7	.571
Northeastern State RiverHawks	2	1999	2000	2	2	4	.500
Northern Michigan Wildcats	7	1975	1987	6	6	12	.500
**Northwest Missouri State Bearcats**	28	1984	2026	53	21	74	.716
**Northwood Timberwolves**	6	2000	2026	1	5	6	.167
Ohio Dominican Panthers	2	2013	2014	2	2	4	.500
**Ouachita Baptist Tigers**	7	2014	2026	1	6	7	.143
Pittsburg State Gorillas	22	1989	2025	28	20	48	.583
Saginaw Valley State Cardinals	8	2000	2013	4	8	12	.333
Savannah State Tigers	1	1992	1992	0	1	1	.000
Seton Hill Griffins	1	2008	2008	1	1	2	.500
Shaw Bears	2	2007	2010	0	2	2	.000
Shepherd Rams	15	1998	2023	18	14	32	.563
Shippensburg Red Raiders	6	1981	2017	3	6	9	.333
Sioux Falls Cougars	4	2015	2019	1	4	5	.200
**Slippery Rock**	13	1997	2026	15	11	26	.577
Southeastern Oklahoma State Savage Storm	1	2004	2004	0	1	1	.000
Southern Arkansas Muleriders	2	1997	2003	0	2	2	.000
Southern Connecticut State Fighting Owls	4	2005	2008	1	4	5	.200
Southwest Baptist Bearcats	1	2016	2016	0	1	1	.000
Texas A&M–Kingsville Javelinas	12	1988	2010	15	12	27	.556
Tiffin Dragons	2	2019	2023	0	2	2	.000
**Truman Bulldogs**	6	1982	2026	0	5	5	.000
Tusculum Pioneers	1	2008	2008	1	1	2	.500
Tuskegee Golden Tigers	4	2013	2016	3	3	6	.500
UT Permian Basin Falcons	2	2023	2025	2	2	4	.500
**Valdosta State Blazers**	22	1994	2026	34	17	51	.667
Virginia State Trojans	2	2014	2017	1	2	3	.333
**Virginia Union Panthers**	14	1979	2026	2	13	15	.133
**Washburn Ichabods**	5	2005	2026	1	4	5	.200
Wayne State (MI) Warriors	1	2011	2011	4	1	5	.800
Wayne State (NE) Wildcats	2	1982	2022	0	2	2	.000
West Alabama Tigers	7	1975	2024	4	7	11	.364
West Chester Golden Rams	14	1988	2019	10	14	24	.417
West Liberty Hilltoppers	1	2009	2009	1	1	2	.500
West Texas A&M Buffaloes	7	2005	2013	8	7	15	.533
**Western Colorado Mountaineers**	8	1992	2026	2	7	9	.222
Wingate Bulldogs	7	2010	2025	4	7	11	.364
Winona State Warriors	7	2001	2022	1	7	8	.125
Winston-Salem State Rams	9	1978	2016	7	9	15	.438

=== Not yet qualified ===
NCAA Division II Football Championship appearances
Conference (Note: According to conferences in football, not necessarily a team's primary conference.)	Team	Joined
Central Intercollegiate Athletic Association (3)	Bluefield State Big Blues	2021
Central Intercollegiate Athletic Association (3)	Lincoln (PA) Lions	2011
Central Intercollegiate Athletic Association (3)	Livingstone Blue Bears	1973
Conference Carolinas (5)	Barton Bulldogs	2021
Conference Carolinas (5)	Chowan Hawks	2007
Conference Carolinas (5)	Erskine Flying Fleet	2021
Conference Carolinas (5)	Ferrum Panthers	2025
Conference Carolinas (5)	Shorter Hawks	2012
Great American Conference (6)	Arkansas–Monticello Boll Weevils	1997
Great American Conference (6)	East Central Tigers	1998
Great American Conference (6)	Northwestern Oklahoma Rangers	2012
Great American Conference (6)	Oklahoma Baptist Bison	2015
Great American Conference (6)	Southern Nazarene Crimson Storm	2012
Great American Conference (6)	Southwestern Oklahoma State Bulldogs	1998
Great Lakes Intercollegiate Athletic Conference (1)	Roosevelt Lakers	2024
Great Lakes Valley Conference (6)	Lincoln (MO) Blue Tigers	2001
Great Lakes Valley Conference (6)	McKendree Bearcats	2012
Great Lakes Valley Conference (6)	Missouri S&T Miners	1973
Great Lakes Valley Conference (6)	Quincy Hawks	2012
Great Lakes Valley Conference (6)	Upper Iowa Peacocks	2005
Great Lakes Valley Conference (6)	William Jewell Cardinals	2012
Great Midwest Athletic Conference (4)	Kentucky Wesleyan Panthers	1993
Great Midwest Athletic Conference (4)	Lake Erie Storm	2010
Great Midwest Athletic Conference (4)	Thomas More Saints	2023
Great Midwest Athletic Conference (4)	Walsh Cavaliers	2012
Lone Star Conference (4)	Eastern New Mexico Greyhounds	1985
Lone Star Conference (4)	Sul Ross Lobos	2024
Lone Star Conference (4)	Western New Mexico Mustangs	1994
Lone Star Conference (4)	Western Oregon Wolves	2001
Mountain East Conference (3)	West Virginia State Yellow Jackets	1997
Mountain East Conference (3)	West Virginia Wesleyan Bobcats	1993
Mountain East Conference (3)	Wheeling Cardinals	2019
Northeast 10 Conference (4)	Franklin Pierce Ravens	2019
Northeast 10 Conference (4)	Pace Setters	1993
Northeast 10 Conference (4)	Post Eagles	2022
Northeast 10 Conference (4)	Saint Anselm Hawks	1999
Northern Sun Intercollegiate Conference (7)	Concordia St. Paul Golden Bears	2002
Northern Sun Intercollegiate Conference (7)	Jamestown Jimmies	2025
Northern Sun Intercollegiate Conference (7)	Mary Marauders	2007
Northern Sun Intercollegiate Conference (7)	Minnesota State Moorhead Dragons	1978
Northern Sun Intercollegiate Conference (7)	Minot State Beavers	2011
Northern Sun Intercollegiate Conference (7)	Northern State Wolves	2000
Northern Sun Intercollegiate Conference (7)	Southwest Minnesota State Mustangs	1993
Pennsylvania State Athletic Conference (2)	Gannon Golden Knights	1993
Pennsylvania State Athletic Conference (2)	Lock Haven Bald Eagles	1980
Rocky Mountain Athletic Conference (5)	Adams State Grizzlies	1990
Rocky Mountain Athletic Conference (5)	Black Hills State Yellow Jackets	2011
Rocky Mountain Athletic Conference (5)	Fort Lewis Skyhawks	1990
Rocky Mountain Athletic Conference (5)	New Mexico Highlands Cowboys	1991
Rocky Mountain Athletic Conference (5)	South Dakota Mines Hardrockers	2011
South Atlantic Conference (3)	Anderson Trojans	2024
South Atlantic Conference (3)	Emory and Henry Wasps	2021
South Atlantic Conference (3)	UVA Wise Cavaliers	2013
Southern Intercollegiate Athletic Conference (3)	Allen Yellow Jackets	2021
Southern Intercollegiate Athletic Conference (3)	Clark Atlanta Panthers	1980
Southern Intercollegiate Athletic Conference (3)	Lane Dragons	1993

- Teams in yellow are ineligible for the playoffs due to a transition to Division II.

== Former NCAA Division II members ==
Former NCAA Division II teams that sponsored football at D-II level and had made at least one appearance in the playoffs, but had either left NCAA Division II or no longer sponsor football.

Team	Appearances	First	Last	Wins	Losses	Total	Pct.
Abilene Christian Wildcats ^{[FCS]}	6	2006	2011	3	6	9	.333
Akron Zips ^{[FBS]}	1	1976	1976	2	1	3	.667
Alabama A&M Bulldogs ^{[FCS]}	2	1979	1989	1	2	3	.333
Alcorn State Braves ^{[FCS]}	1	1974	1974	0	1	1	.000
Azusa Pacific Cougars ^{[D3]}	2	2016	2018	0	2	2	.000
Bethune–Cookman Wildcats ^{[FCS]}	1	1977	1977	0	1	1	.000
Boise State Broncos ^{[FBS]}	3	1973	1975	1	3	4	.250
Bryant Bulldogs ^{[FCS]}	2	2006	2007	0	2	2	.000
Butler Bulldogs ^{[FCS]}	3	1983	1991	0	3	3	.000
Cal Poly–San Luis Obispo Mustangs ^{[FCS]}	3	1978	1990	4	2	6	.667
Cal State Northridge Matadors ^{[D1]}	1	1990	1990	0	1	1	.000
Central Arkansas Bears ^{[FCS]}	2	2001	2005	2	2	4	.500
UCF Knights ^{[FBS]}	1	1987	1987	1	1	1	.500
Central Michigan Chippewas ^{[FBS]}	1	1974	1974	3	0	3	1.000
Delaware Fightin' Blue Hens ^{[FBS]}	5	1973	1979	7	4	11	.636
East Texas A&M Lions ^{[FCS]} (Note: East Texas A&M was known by two different names during its Division II tenure–first East Texas State University through the 1995 football season, then as Texas A&M University–Commerce before adopting its current name in November 2024, a little more than two years after its move to Division I.)	8	1990	2019	11	7	18	.611
Eastern Illinois Panthers ^{[FCS]}	2	1978	1980	5	1	6	.833
Eastern Kentucky Colonels ^{[FCS]}	1	1976	1976	0	1	1	.000
Florida Tech Panthers ^{[NF]}	2	2016	2018	0	2	2	.000
Grambling State Tigers ^{[FCS]}	1	1973	1973	1	1	2	.500
Hampton Pirates ^{[FCS]}	3	1985	1993	1	3	4	.250
Humboldt State Lumberjacks ^{[NF]} (Note: The university changed its name to California State Polytechnic University, Humboldt in January 2022, well after football was dropped. The athletic program is now known as the Cal Poly Humboldt Lumberjacks.)	1	2015	2015	1	1	2	.500
Jacksonville State Gamecocks ^{[FBS]}	10	1977	1992	15	9	24	.625
Lehigh Mountain Hawks ^{[FCS]}	3	1973	1977	3	2	5	.600
Limestone Saints ^{[Defunct]}	2	2022	2023	0	2	2	.000
Lindenwood Lions ^{[FCS]}	2	2019	2021	1	2	3	.333
LIU Post Pioneers ^{[FCS]} (Note: After the 2018–19 school year, Long Island University merged the athletic programs of its two campuses—Division I LIU Brooklyn and Division II LIU Post—into a single Division I program under the LIU name. All varsity sports previously sponsored by either campus continued to be sponsored by the new LIU program, which inherited LIU Brooklyn's Division I and Northeast Conference memberships. The new nickname of Sharks was announced on May 15, 2019.)	6	2002	2018	3	6	9	.333
Louisiana Tech Bulldogs ^{[FBS]}	2	1973	1974	4	1	5	.800
Massachusetts Minutemen ^{[FBS]}	1	1977	1977	1	1	2	.500
Mercyhurst Lakers ^{[FCS]}	1	2010	2010	1	1	2	.500
Merrimack Warriors ^{[FCS]}	1	2006	2006	1	1	2	.500
Mississippi College Choctaws ^{[NF]} (Note: The university changed its name to Mississippi Christian University in 2026, two years after football was dropped. The athletic program is now known as the Mississippi Christian Choctaws.)	5	1979	1991	8	4	12	.667
Montana State Bobcats ^{[FCS]}	1	1976	1976	3	0	3	1.000
Morgan State Bears ^{[FCS]}	1	1979	1979	0	1	1	.000
Nebraska–Omaha Mavericks ^{[D1]} (Note: The athletic program rebranded itself as the Omaha Mavericks after dropping football.)	10	1978	2008	2	10	12	.167
New Hampshire Wildcats ^{[FCS]}	2	1975	1976	1	2	3	.333
New Haven Chargers ^{[FCS]}	10	1992	2024	10	11	21	.476
Norfolk State Spartans ^{[FCS]}	1	1984	1984	0	1	1	.000
North Alabama Lions ^{[FCS]}	21	1980	2016	35	18	53	.660
North Carolina Central Eagles ^{[FCS]}	3	1988	2006	1	3	4	.250
North Dakota Fighting Sioux ^{[FCS]} (Note: North Dakota changed its nickname to Fighting Hawks in 2015, several years after it moved to FCS.)	14	1975	2007	18	13	31	.581
North Dakota State Bison ^{[FBS]}	17	1976	2000	30	12	42	.714
Northern Arizona Lumberjacks ^{[FCS]}	1	1977	1977	0	1	1	.000
Northern Colorado Bears ^{[FCS]}	9	1980	2002	12	7	19	.632
Northern Iowa Panthers ^{[FCS]}	1	1975	1975	0	1	1	.000
Notre Dame Falcons ^{[Defunct]}	4	2018	2022	5	4	9	.556
Portland State Vikings ^{[FCS]}	8	1987	1995	12	8	20	.600
Presbyterian Blue Hose ^{[FCS]}	1	2005	2005	0	1	1	.000
Puget Sound Loggers ^{[D3]}	1	1981	1981	0	1	1	.000
Sacramento State Hornets ^{[FBS]}	1	1988	1988	2	1	3	.667
St. Cloud State Huskies ^{[NF]}	5	1989	2013	4	5	9	.444
Santa Clara Broncos ^{[D1]}	1	1980	1980	1	1	2	.500
South Dakota Coyotes ^{[FCS]}	4	1973	2006	4	4	8	.500
South Dakota State Jackrabbits ^{[FCS]}	1	1979	1979	0	1	1	.000
Tarleton State Texans ^{[FCS]} (Note: The program was branded exclusively as "Tarleton State" during its entire Division II tenure. The school now uses "Tarleton" and "Tarleton State" interchangeably for athletic purposes.)	5	2001	2019	4	5	9	.444
Tennessee–Martin Skyhawks ^{[FCS]} (Note: The program changed its brand to "UT Martin" several years after moving to Division I. The university name has not changed.)	1	1988	1988	1	1	2	.500
Texas State Bobcats ^{[FBS]}	3	1981	1983	6	1	7	.857
Towson Tigers ^{[FCS]}	3	1983	1986	1	3	4	.250
Troy Trojans ^{[FBS]}	3	1984	1987	7	1	2	.875
UC Davis Aggies ^{[FCS]}	18	1977	2002	15	18	33	.455
UNLV Rebels ^{[FBS]}	2	1974	1976	1	2	3	.333
West Florida Argonauts ^{[FCS]}	6	2017	2025	12	4	15	.750
West Georgia Wolves ^{[FCS]}	9	1988	2021	6	8	12	.429
Western Carolina Catamounts ^{[FCS]}	1	1974	1974	0	1	1	.000
Western Illinois Leathernecks ^{[FCS]}	1	1973	1973	0	1	1	.000
Western Kentucky Hilltoppers ^{[FBS]}	2	1973	1975	4	2	6	.667
Western Washington Vikings ^{[NF]}	1	1999	1999	0	1	1	.000
Wofford Terriers ^{[FCS]}	3	2002	2005	2	3	5	.400
Youngstown State Penguins ^{[FCS]}	3	1974	1979	3	3	6	.500

== Notes ==
=== Program changes ===
- ^{FBS} Program has since joined Division I FBS.
- ^{FCS} Program has since joined Division I FCS.
- ^{D1} Program has since joined NCAA Division I but has dropped football.
- ^{D3} Program has since joined Division III.
- ^{NF} Program remains in Division II but has dropped football.
- ^{Defunct} College has closed its doors.

== See also ==
- List of NCAA Division II football programs
- List of NCAA Division I FBS football bowl records
- List of NCAA Division I FCS playoff appearances by team
- List of NCAA Division III Football Championship appearances by team
- List of NAIA national football championship series appearances by team
