= Steve Campbell (American football) =

American football player and coach (born 1966)

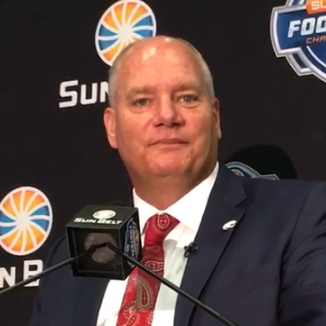
- Campbell at 2018 Sun Belt Media Day

Current position
- Title: Offensive line/tight ends coach
- Team: UMS-Wright Preparatory School

Biographical details
- Born: April 11, 1966 (age 60); Pensacola, Florida, U.S.

Playing career
- 1984–1985: Southeastern Louisiana
- 1986–1987: Troy State
- Position: Center

Coaching career (HC unless noted)
- 1988–1989: Auburn (GA)
- 1990–1992: Delta State (OL)
- 1993–1995: Nicholls State (OC)
- 1996: Southwest Mississippi (RB)
- 1997–1998: Southwest Mississippi
- 1999–2001: Delta State
- 2002: Middle Tennessee (OC/OL)
- 2003: Mississippi State (OL)
- 2004–2013: Mississippi Gulf Coast
- 2014–2017: Central Arkansas
- 2018–2020: South Alabama
- 2021–2022: UMS-Wright (AL) (volunteer)
- 2024–present: UMS-Wright (AL) (OL/TE)

Administrative career (AD unless noted)
- 2023: Mississippi State (DOHSR)

Head coaching record
- Overall: 69–49 (college); 99–30 (junior college)
- Bowls: 4–2 (NJCAA)
- Tournaments: 4–0 (NCAA D-II playoffs); 1–2 (NCAA D-I playoffs); 1–0 (NJCAA playoffs); 9–5 (MACJC playoffs)

Accomplishments and honors

Championships
- 1 NCAA Division II (2000); 1 NJCAA (2007); 3 MACJC (2007–2008, 2010); 7 MACJC South Division (2005, 2007–2012); 1 GSC (2000); 1 SLC (2017)

Awards
- NCAA Division II National Coach of the Year (2000); NJCAA National Coach of the Year (2007); Southland Coach of the Year (2017)

Steve Campbell (born April 11, 1966) is an American football coach and former player. He currently serves as the offensive line and tight ends coach at UMS-Wright Preparatory School in Mobile, Alabama. Campbell was the head football coach at the University of South Alabama from 2018 to 2020. Campbell has previously served as head football coach at Southwest Mississippi Community College from 1997 to 1998, Delta State University from 1999 to 2001, Mississippi Gulf Coast Community College from 2004 to 2013 and the University of Central Arkansas from 2014 until 2017.

He has been involved with three National Championship winning teams — first as an NCAA Division II player in 1987, then as a D-II head coach in 2000 and lastly as a junior college head coach in 2007.

== Personal life ==
Campbell was born in Pensacola, Florida, and graduated from J.M. Tate High School in nearby Cantonment. Campbell was a football player in college, starting at center in 43 straight games for Southeastern Louisiana and Troy State University. In 1987, he was a member of the NCAA Division II National Championship team at Troy, and was named an All-Gulf South Conference first team selection. Campbell was named Academic All-Conference three times and graduated cum laude from Troy State with a bachelor's degree in economics. He also earned a master's degree in business administration from Auburn University.

== Coaching career ==
Campbell's coaching career started as a graduate assistant at Auburn University under head coach Pat Dye, where he helped the Tigers football team win back-to-back SEC titles. While on the Plains, Campbell got experience coaching in two bowl games, including the 1990 Hall of Fame Bowl where they defeated Ohio State 31–14.

His first full-time position was as offensive line coach and strength and conditioning coach at Delta State University from 1990 to 1992. He spent his final season as the offensive coordinator for DSU before taking the position of offensive coordinator and backfield coach under Rick Rhoades at Nicholls State University from 1993 to 1995 (Rhoades was Campbell's coach at Troy).

In 1997, Campbell received his first head coaching position, taking over at Southwest Mississippi Community College, where he had spent the previous season coaching the running backs. During his two seasons with the Bears, Campbell's teams went 12–8, including the school's first winning season in 12 years.

Campbell returned to Delta State University as head coach in 1999, compiling a 27–8 record with a school record (.771) winning percentage over three seasons. His no-huddle offense shattered 12 Gulf South Conference Records and six NCAA Division II records. DSU also won the 2000 NCAA Division II Championship, with Campbell earning National Coach of the Year honors by three different organizations. His final season at Delta State was the 2001 season.

In 2002, Campbell became the offensive coordinator and offensive line coach at Middle Tennessee State University. At Middle Tennessee, Campbell's offense produced a 1,000-yard rusher and scored more than 20 points against three of the four SEC teams faced, including a win at in-state rival Vanderbilt. In 2003, he then served as offensive line coach for Jackie Sherrill in his last season at Mississippi State before taking the head coaching position at Mississippi Gulf Coast Community College in March 2004.

At Mississippi Gulf Coast Community College (MGCCC), he went 87–22 (.798) over his ten seasons from 2004 to 2013 despite his predecessor going only 6–12 in his two seasons in charge. Campbell coached Gulf Coast to a NJCAA Junior College co-National Championship in 2007. Several players on that team went on to play in the Southeastern Conference including Eltoro Freeman and Demond Washington at Auburn, Terrence Cody at Alabama and Chris White and Sean Brauchle at Mississippi State. Prior to Campbell's arrival, the Bulldogs football team had not made it to the state playoffs since 1986.

Steve Campbell is a quality person and a proven coach who has successfully rebuilt programs.

— Dr. Willis Lott, Gulf Coast president

In December 2008, Campbell was a finalist for the head coaching position at Northwestern State University. Other finalists included Bradley Dale Peveto, co-defensive coordinator at Louisiana State University and a former Northwestern State assistant, who eventually got the job.

On January 12, 2009, Campbell interviewed with new head coach Gene Chizik to fill the vacant position coaching the offensive line at Auburn University, but the job was filled by Colorado assistant head coach Jeff Grimes.

Campbell led his 2009 MGCCC Bulldogs team to a 9–2 record after losing 75–71 in the MACJC State Championship game, ending Gulf Coast's bid for three straight MACJC titles.

In 2010, Campbell led Gulf Coast to a 10–2 record (the two losses were a combined six points) including a 31–17 win over Copiah-Lincoln in the MACJC Championship game and a 62–53 win versus #3 ranked Grand Rapids (10–1) in the Mississippi Bowl. The combined 115 points set a Mississippi Bowl record. A member of that team, Don Jones went on to be drafted by the Miami Dolphins in the 2013 NFL draft and made the team as a safety. Under Campbell's leadership, Gulf Coast consistently ranked in the NJCAA National Poll, finishing #13 in 2005, #8 in 2006, #1 in 2007, #4 in 2008, #8 in 2009, #3 in 2010 and #6 in 2011.

In December 2013, Campbell was named head football coach at the University of Central Arkansas (UCA). From 2014 to 2017, he compiled a record of 33 wins and 15 losses over four seasons, made two playoff appearances, and won a Southland Conference championship. In December 2017, Campbell agreed to a four-year contract with the University of South Alabama that paid him $600,000 per year, triple what he was earning at FCS Central Arkansas. Campbell's replacement at UCA was his offensive coordinator, Nathan Brown. After going 9–26 in three years, South Alabama decided to move on from Campbell.

On August 20, 2021, Campbell was hired to join the staff at UMS-Wright Preparatory School in Mobile, Alabama as a volunteer coach.

On February 3, 2023, Campbell along with fellow former South Alabama head coach, Joey Jones, was hired by Zach Arnett to join back with Mississippi State with Campbell joining as the director of high school relations.

On July 23, 2024, Campbell returned to UMS-Wright's coaching staff on a full-time basis as their offensive line and tight ends coach.

== Head coaching record ==
=== College ===
Year	Team	Overall	Conference	Standing	Bowl/playoffs	AP/STATS^{#}	Coaches^{°}
Delta State Statesmen (Gulf South Conference) (1999–2001)
1999	Delta State	6–4	6–3	4th			
2000	Delta State	14–1	8–1	1st	W NCAA Division II Championship		
2001	Delta State	7–3	6–3	T–4th			
Delta State:		27–8	20–7				
Central Arkansas Bears (Southland Conference) (2014–2017)
2014	Central Arkansas	6–6	5–3	T–3rd			
2015	Central Arkansas	7–4	7–2	T–2nd			
2016	Central Arkansas	10–3	8–1	2nd	L NCAA Division I Second Round	14	16
2017	Central Arkansas	10–2	9–0	1st	L NCAA Division I Second Round	10	8
Central Arkansas:		33–15	29–6				
South Alabama Jaguars (Sun Belt Conference) (2018–2020)
2018	South Alabama	3–9	2–6	4th (West)			
2019	South Alabama	2–10	1–7	5th (West)			
2020	South Alabama	4–7	3–5	2nd (West)			
South Alabama:		9–26	6–18				
Total:		69–49					
National championship Conference title Conference division title or championship game berth

=== Junior college ===
Year	Team	Overall	Conference	Standing	Bowl/playoffs
Southwest Mississippi Bears (Mississippi Association of Community and Junior Colleges) (1997–1998)
1997	Southwest Mississippi	6–4	3–3	4th (South)	
1998	Southwest Mississippi	6–4	3–3	T–3rd (South)	
Southwest Mississippi:		12–8	6–6		
Mississippi Gulf Coast Bulldogs (Mississippi Association of Community and Junior Colleges) (2004–2013)
2004	Mississippi Gulf Coast	5–4		(South)	
2005	Mississippi Gulf Coast	7–3	5–1	1st (South)	L MACJC Championship, L Dalton Defenders Bowl
2006	Mississippi Gulf Coast	7–2		(South)	
2007	Mississippi Gulf Coast	12–0	6–0	1st (South)	W MACJC Championship, W C.H.A.M.P.S. Heart of Texas Bowl
2008	Mississippi Gulf Coast	10–2	5–1	1st (South)	W MACJC Championship, W Mississippi Bowl
2009	Mississippi Gulf Coast	9–3	6–0	1st (South)	L MACJC Championship, L C.H.A.M.P.S. Heart of Texas Bowl
2010	Mississippi Gulf Coast	10–2		1st (South)	W MACJC Championship, W Mississippi Bowl
2011	Mississippi Gulf Coast	10–2	6–0	1st (South)	L MACJC Championship, W Mississippi Bowl
2012	Mississippi Gulf Coast	9–2	5–1	1st (South)	L MACJC Championship
2013	Mississippi Gulf Coast	8–2		2nd (South)	L MACJC Semifinal
Mississippi Gulf Coast:		87–22			
Total:		99–30			
National championship Conference title Conference division title or championship game berth
