= Rick Comegy =

American football player and coach (born 1953)

Biographical details
- Born: September 24, 1953 (age 73); Chester, Pennsylvania, U.S.

Playing career
- 1970s: Millersville
- Position: Defensive back

Coaching career (HC unless noted)

Football
- 1975–1977: Millersville (assistant)
- 1978–1984: Colgate (assistant)
- 1985–1989: Central State (OH) (assistant)
- 1990–1991: Cheyney
- 1992–1993: Central State (OH) (assistant)
- 1994–1995: Central State (OH)
- 1996–2005: Tuskegee
- 2006–2013: Jackson State
- 2014–2017: Mississippi Valley State

Baseball
- 1980–1984: Colgate

Head coaching record
- Overall: 169–124 (football); 33–90 (baseball)
- Bowls: 3–1
- Tournaments: 3–2 (NAIA D-I playoffs)

Accomplishments and honors

Championships
- 1 NAIA Division I (1995); 1 black college national (2000); 6 SIAC (1998–2002, 2005); 1 SWAC (2007); 6 SWAC East Division (2007–2008, 2010–2013)

Awards
- NAIA Division I Coach of the Year (1995)

Rick Comegy (born September 24, 1953) is an American former college football and college baseball coach. On January 21, 2014, Comegy was introduced as the head coach at Mississippi Valley State. He previously served as the head football coach at Jackson State University in Jackson, Mississippi from 2006 to 2013. He was named JSU head coach on December 9, 2005 after ten years as head coach of Tuskegee University, where he compiled a 90–26 record. He has also served as head coach of Cheyney University and Central State University, where he won the NAIA national football championship in 1995. He served as an assistant coach at Central State under former Billy Joe in the 80s and 90s.

Comegy was the 15th head coach at Tuskegee University in Tuskegee, Alabama and he held that position for ten seasons, from 1996 until 2005. His coaching record at Tuskegee was 90–26.

Comegy is a 1976 graduate of Millersville University and has held coaching positions at Millersville and Colgate University, where he also coached track and baseball.

== Head coaching record ==
Year	Team	Overall	Conference	Standing	Bowl/playoffs
Cheyney Wolves (Pennsylvania State Athletic Conference) (1990–1991)
1990	Cheyney	0–11	0–5	6th (Eastern)	
1991	Cheyney	0–11	0–6	7th (Eastern)	
Cheyney:		0–22	0–11		
Central State Marauders (NAIA Division I independent) (1994–1995)
1994	Central State	8–2			L NAIA Division I Quarterfinal
1995	Central State	10–1			W NAIA Division I Championship
Central State:		18–3			
Tuskegee Golden Tigers (Southern Intercollegiate Athletic Conference) (1996–2005)
1996	Tuskegee	5–6	2–4	T–8th	
1997	Tuskegee	7–4	3–3	T–5th	
1998	Tuskegee	10–2	6–0	1st	W Pioneer
1999	Tuskegee	9–3	5–1	T–1st	L Pioneer
2000	Tuskegee	12–0	7–0	1st	W Pioneer
2001	Tuskegee	11–1	6–1	T–1st	W Pioneer
2002	Tuskegee	10–1	7–1	1st	
2003	Tuskegee	5–6	4–4	T–5th	
2004	Tuskegee	10–2	7–1	2nd	L Pioneer
2005	Tuskegee	11–1	8–1	T–1st	W Pioneer
Tuskegee:		90–26	55–16		
Jackson State Tigers (Southwestern Athletic Conference) (2006–2013)
2006	Jackson State	6–5	5–4	T–2nd (East)	
2007	Jackson State	8–4	7–2	1st (East)	
2008	Jackson State	7–5	6–1	1st (East)	
2009	Jackson State	3–7	3–4	T–2nd (East)	
2010	Jackson State	8–3	6–3	T–1st (East)	
2011	Jackson State	9–2	7–2	T–1st (East)	
2012	Jackson State	7–5	7–2	T–1st (East)	
2013	Jackson State	8–4	8–1	1st (East)	
Jackson State:		55–35	49–19		
Mississippi Valley State Delta Devils (Southwestern Athletic Conference) (2014–2017)
2014	Mississippi Valley State	2–9	1–8	5th (East)	
2015	Mississippi Valley State	1–10	1–8	5th (East)	
2016	Mississippi Valley State	1–10	1–8	5th (East)	
2017	Mississippi Valley State	2–9	1–6	5th (East)	
Mississippi Valley State:		6–38	4–30		
Total:		169–124			
National championship Conference title Conference division title or championship game berth
