= Gold Bowl =

Gold Bowl (defunct)
- Stadium: City Stadium
- Location: Richmond, Virginia, U.S.
- Operated: 1977–1980
- Conference tie-ins: MEAC, CIAA

Former names
- Bicentennial Bowl (1976)

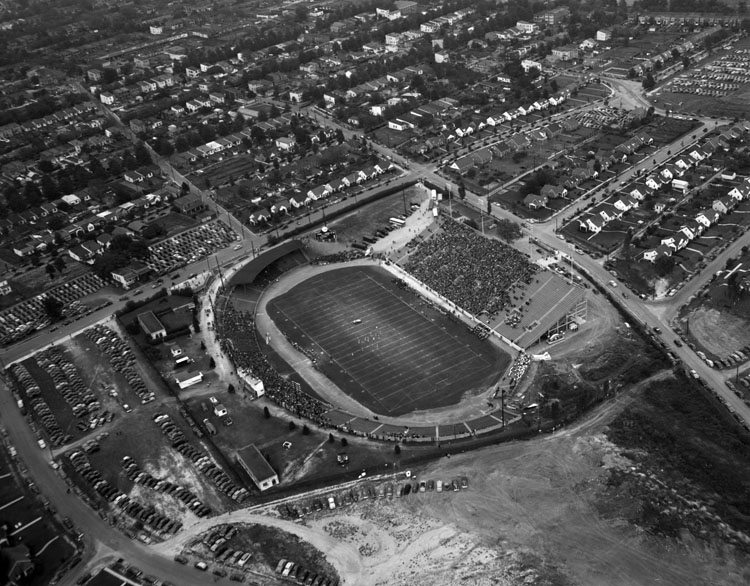
City Stadium in Richmond, Virginia

The Gold Bowl was an American college football bowl game between teams from the Mid-Eastern Athletic Conference (MEAC) and the Central Intercollegiate Athletics Association (CIAA), two athletic conferences traditionally consisting of historically black colleges and universities (HBCUs). The game was played on a Saturday in early December from 1977 through 1980 at City Stadium in Richmond, Virginia. An immediate precursor to the Gold Bowl, dubbed the Bicentennial Bowl in celebration of the bicentennial year, matched teams from the same two conferences in the same stadium in December 1976.

== History ==
On August 29, 1976, officials of the Mid-Eastern Athletic Conference (MEAC) and the Central Intercollegiate Athletics Association (CIAA) announced that their champions would meet in a postseason game called the Bicentennial Bowl, to be held at Memorial Stadium in Charlotte, North Carolina, on the first Saturday of December. Plans changed that October when Black Super Conference, a Houston-based television network, offered to televise the inaugural game, but on the second Saturday of December rather than the first. Memorial Stadium was not available on that day, prompting bowl organizers to move the game to City Stadium in Richmond, Virginia.

In September 1977, the two conferences announced that the game would remain in Richmond, rebranded as the Gold Bowl, and move to the first Saturday in December. Bowl organizers made the game the centerpiece of a festive weekend including a Gold Bowl parade and, as of 1978, a Friday-night basketball doubleheader featuring four HBCU teams.

South Carolina State of the MEAC was recognized as Black college football national co-champion after winning the 1977 game.

The success of the MEAC vs. the CIAA ultimately caused the Gold Bowl to be discontinued. The MEAC had been founded in 1970 with a core membership of six schools that seceded from the CIAA, with the ultimate goal of competing at the highest level of the NCAA. In June 1978 the MEAC achieved reclassification from Division II to Division I and began to play in the NCAA Division I Football Championship Subdivision (then known as Division I-AA) that fall. Meanwhile, the CIAA remained in Division II, and the competitive gap between the two conferences soon became apparent. MEAC teams won three of the four games, and trounced their CIAA opponents in the 1979 and 1980 Gold Bowls. In April 1981, CIAA officials announced that the game was being discontinued, and that in future years the conference's signature football event would be a neutral-site conference championship game matching the first-place teams of its two divisions.

The Gold Bowl remains unique as the only postseason football contest that has matched teams from different divisions within the NCAA.

== Game results ==
Date played	Winning team		Losing team		Ref.
December 3, 1977	South Carolina State (MEAC)	10	Winston-Salem State (CIAA)	7	
December 2, 1978	Virginia Union (CIAA)	21	North Carolina A&T (MEAC)	6	
December 1, 1979	South Carolina State (MEAC)	39	Norfolk State (CIAA)	7	
December 6, 1980	North Carolina A&T (MEAC)	37	North Carolina Central (CIAA)	0	

== Legacy ==
The parade and other social activities developed for the Gold Bowl survived as part of the in-season Gold Bowl Classic, created in July 1981 and first contested that October, matching Richmond's own Virginia Union against Virginia State from nearby Petersburg. The Gold Bowl Classic survived into the 21st century as an annual home game for Virginia Union, held at Hovey Field, its on-campus stadium, until 2007. The classic claimed the MEAC–CIAA Gold Bowls as part of its history, for example, branding the 2007 game as the 31st Annual Gold Bowl Classic.

The MEAC eventually joined the other HBCU conference at the Division I-AA/FCS level, the Southwestern Athletic Conference (SWAC), in sponsoring the Heritage Bowl (1991–99) and the Celebration Bowl (2015–present). The CIAA eventually joined the other HBCU Division II conference, the Southern Intercollegiate Athletic Conference (SIAC), in sponsoring the Pioneer Bowl (1997–2012) and the Florida Beach Bowl (2023).
