= Delta State Statesmen football =

Football team of Delta State University

- First season: 1926; 100 years ago
- Head coach: David Dean; 1st season, 0–0 (–)
- Location: Cleveland, Mississippi
- Stadium: McCool Stadium (capacity: 8,000)
- Field: Travis E. Parker Field
- NCAA division: Division II
- Conference: Gulf South Conference
- Colors: Forest green and white
- All-time record: 481–406–23 (.541)

NCAA Division II championships
- 2000
- Website: gostatesmen.com

The Delta State Statesmen football team represents Delta State University, located in Cleveland, Mississippi, in NCAA Division II college football. The Statesmen, who began playing football in 1926, currently compete as members of the Gulf South Conference (GSC). Delta State plays home games on campus at McCool Stadium.

Delta State has won one national championship at the Division II level, in 2000.

== History ==
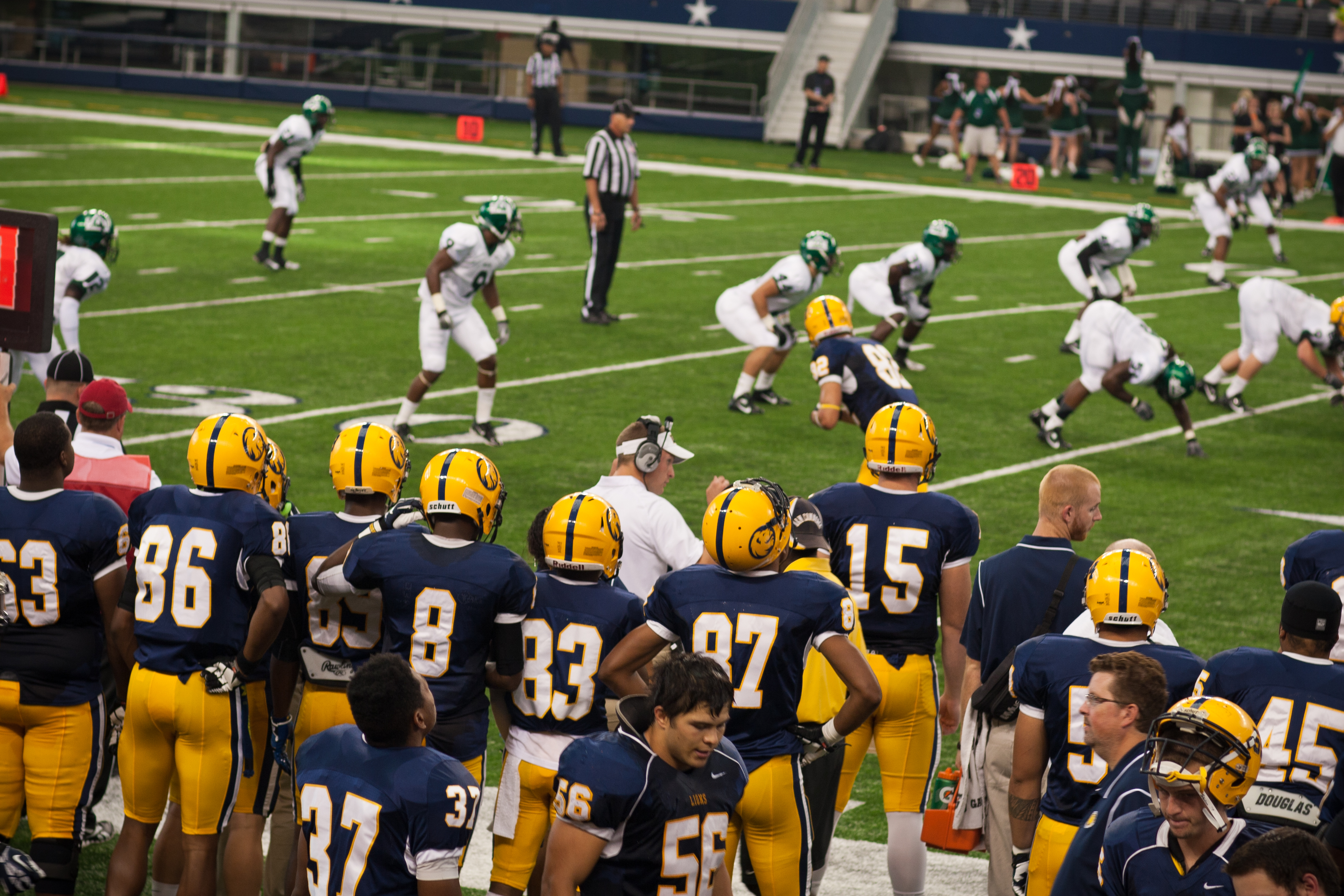
The Delta State football team in action against the Texas A&M–Commerce Lions in 2013

Delta State won the 2000 NCAA Division II football championship. Delta State's football team won the Gulf South Conference championship in 1998, 2000, 2007, 2008, 2010, 2011, 2014, 2022, and 2023. They were runners-up in the NCAA Division II football championship in 2010. They were national semifinalists and regional champions in 2011.

== Championships ==
=== Conference championships ===
- Gulf South Conference: 1998, 2000, 2006, 2007, 2008, 2010, 2011, 2014, 2017, 2022, 2023

== Postseason appearances ==
=== NCAA Division II playoffs ===
The Statesmen have made eleven appearances in the NCAA Division II playoffs, with a combined record of 17–10 and one national championship.

Year	Round	Opponent	Result
1998	First Round	Fort Valley State	L, 14–21
2000	First Round; Quarterfinals; Semifinals; National Championship	Valdosta State; Catawba; North Dakota State; Bloomsburg	W, 49–12; W, 20–14; W, 34–16; W, 63–34
2006	First Round; Second Round; Quarterfinals; Semifinals	Elizabeth City State; North Carolina Central; North Alabama; Grand Valley State	W, 17–10; W, 24–17; W, 27–10; L, 30–49
2007	First Round; Second Round	Shaw; North Alabama	W, 45–7; L, 17–20
2008	Second Round; Quarterfinals	Tusculum; North Alabama	W, 27–19; L, 34–55
2010	Second Round; Quarterfinals; Semifinals; National Championship	North Alabama; Albany State; Shepherd; Minnesota–Duluth	W, 47–24; W, 28–7; W, 29–17; L, 17–20
2011	Second Round; Quarterfinals; Semifinals	North Alabama; North Greenville; Pittsburg State	W, 42–14; W, 28–23; L, 23–49
2014	Second Round	West Georgia	L, 27–37
2017	First Round; Second Round	Bowie State; West Alabama	W, 45–35; L, 20–27
2022	First Round; Second Round	Fayetteville State; West Florida	W, 51–0; L, 27–38
2023	First Round; Second Round	West Florida; Valdosta State	W, 48–14; L, 31–38

== Alumni ==
- George Chesser
- Pete Golding
- Jack Gregory
- Mark Hudspeth
- Anthony Maddox
- Aubrey Matthews
- Wilbur Myers
- Aubrey Rozzell
