= Johnson Stadium =

Johnson Stadium may refer to

- J. L. Johnson Stadium, baseball venue in Tulsa, Oklahoma, home to the Oral Roberts Golden Eagles
- Charlie W. Johnson Stadium, Columbia, South Carolina, primarily used for American football, and the home field of Benedict College
- Johnson Stadium at Doubleday Field, baseball venue on the campus of the United States Military Academy, in West Point, New York
- Johnson Hagood Stadium, football stadium in Charleston, South Carolina, the home field of The Citadel Bulldogs
- Grace P. Johnson Stadium, at Lumbee Guaranty Bank Field, is a college football stadium in Pembroke, North Carolina.
