= 2000 Humboldt State Lumberjacks football team =

American college football season

2000 Humboldt State Lumberjacks football
- Conference: Columbia Football Association
- Record: 4–7 (1–3 CFA)
- Head coach: Doug Adkins (1st season)
- Home stadium: Redwood Bowl

2000 Columbia Football Association standings
| | Conf. | | | Overall |
| Team | W | | L | W | | L |
|---|---|---|---|---|---|---|
| No. 5 Western Washington + | 3 | – | 1 | 7 | – | 3 |
| Central Washington + | 3 | – | 1 | 5 | – | 5 |
| Western Oregon | 2 | – | 2 | 6 | – | 5 |
| Humboldt State | 1 | – | 3 | 4 | – | 7 |
| Simon Fraser * | 1 | – | 3 | 2 | – | 8 |
+ – Conference co-champions; * – principally classified as NAIA member; Rankings from AFCA West Region poll

The 2000 Humboldt State Lumberjacks football team represented Humboldt State University—now known as California State Polytechnic University, Humboldt—as a member of the Columbia Football Association (CFA) during the 2000 NCAA Division II football season. Led first-year head coach Doug Adkins, the Lumberjacks compiled an overall record of 4–7 with a mark of 1–3 in conference play, tying for fourth place in the CFA. The team was outscored its by opponents 224 to 192 for the season. Humboldt State played home games at the Redwood Bowl in Arcata, California.

== Schedule ==
| Date | Opponent | Site | Result | Attendance | Source |
|---|---|---|---|---|---|
| September 2 | at Montana Tech* | Alumni Coliseum; Butte, MT | L 16–19 | | |
| September 9 | at Montana State* | Bobcat Stadium; Bozeman, MT | W 23–14 | 10,237 | |
| September 16 | Saint Mary's* | Redwood Bowl; Arcata, CA | L 7–26 | | |
| September 23 | Rocky Mountain* | Redwood Bowl; Arcata, CA | W 19–13 | | |
| September 30 | Southern Oregon* | Redwood Bowl; Arcata, CA | L 7–14 | | |
| October 7 | at Azusa Pacific* | Cougar Athletic Stadium; Azusa, CA | L 32–35 | | |
| October 14 | Simon Fraser | Redwood Bowl; Arcata, CA | W 31–21 | | |
| October 21 | at Central Washington | Tomlinson Stadium; Ellensburg, WA | L 0–13 | | |
| October 28 | Lenoir–Rhyne* | Redwood Bowl; Arcata, CA | W 37–10 | | |
| November 4 | at No. 5 Western Washington | Civic Stadium; Bellingham, WA | L 7–42 | | |
| November 11 | at Western Oregon | McArthur Field; Monmouth, OR | L 13–17 | | |
*Non-conference game; Rankings from AFCA West Region Poll released prior to the game
