= 2000 NCAA Division II football rankings =

The 2000 NCAA Division II football rankings are from the American Football Coaches Association (AFCA). For the preseason and the first 3 weeks of the season, the poll consisted of 25 teams. Starting with week 4 of the season, the poll was segregated into four regions, with 10 teams ranked in each region. 2000 was the only year this regional poll was attempted. In 2001, the AFCA went back to a "Top 25" nationally.

== Legend ==
	Increase in ranking
	Decrease in ranking
	Not ranked previous week
(#–#)	Win–loss record
(Italics)	Number of first place votes
т	Tied with team above or below also with this symbol

== The American Football Coaches Association poll (Preseason and 3 Weeks of Season) ==
	Preseason (Note: Although one was published, no preseason poll has been found. 23 of the 25 rankings are known, based on the first regular season poll.)	Week 1 Sept 5	Week 2 Sept 12	Week 3 Sept 19	
1.	Northwest Missouri State	Northwest Missouri State (1–0) (22)	Northwest Missouri State (2–0) (23)	Northwest Missouri State (3–0) (24)	1.
2.	Carson–Newman	Carson–Newman (2–0) (5)	Carson–Newman (2–0) (3)	Carson–Newman (3–0) (3)	2.
3.	North Dakota State	North Dakota State (1–0) (1)	North Dakota State (2–0) (2)	North Dakota State (3–0) (1)	3.
4.	UC Davis (Note: In the actual printed polls, UC Davis was sometimes listed as California Davis)	UC Davis (1–0)	UC Davis (2–0)	UC Davis (3–0)	4.
5.	IUP (Note: In the actual printed polls, IUP was listed as Indiana (PA))	IUP (1–0)	IUP (1–0)	IUP (2–0)	5.
6.	Pittsburg State	Pittsburg State (1–0)	Pittsburg State (2–0)	Catawba (3–0)	6.
7.	Northern Colorado	Catawba (1–0)	Catawba (2–0)	Northeastern State (2–0)	7.
8.	Slippery Rock	Angelo State (1–0)	Angelo State (2–0)	South Dakota State (3–0)	8.
9.	Catawba	Southern Arkansas (1–0)	Southern Arkansas (1–0)	North Dakota (3–0)	9.
10.	Texas A&M–Kingsville	Northeastern State (1–0)	South Dakota State (2–0)	Pittsburg State (2–1)	10.
11.	Central Oklahoma	South Dakota State (1–0)	Northeastern State (1–0)	West Georgia (3–0)	11.
12.		Slippery Rock (0–1)	North Dakota (2–0)	Slippery Rock (2–1)	12.
13.	Southern Arkansas	North Dakota (1–0)	Slippery Rock (1–1)	Valdosta State (3–0)	13.
14.	Northeastern State	Central Oklahoma (0–1)	West Georgia (2–0)	Northwood (2–0)	14.
15.	Millersville	West Georgia (1–0)	Northwood (1–0)	Shepherd (2–0)	15.
16.	Northwood	Millersville (0–0)	Shepherd (1–0)	Angelo State (2–1)	16.
17.	South Dakota State	Northwood (0–0)	Northern Colorado (1–1)	Northern Colorado (2–1)	17.
18.	Angelo State	Shepherd (1–0)	Valdosta State (1–0)	Southern Arkansas (1–1)	18.
19.	West Georgia	Northern Colorado (0–1)	Nebraska–Omaha (1–1)	Nebraska–Omaha (2–1)	19.
20.	Shepherd	Nebraska–Kearney (1–0)	New Haven (2–0)	Arkansas Tech (1–1)	20.
21.	Nebraska–Omaha	Valdosta State (1–0)	Arkansas Tech (0–1)	Millersville (1–1)	21.
22.		Nebraska–Omaha (0–1)	Millersville (0–1)	Western Washington (2–1)	22.
23.	Arkansas Tech	Texas A&M–Kingsville (0–1)	Central Oklahoma (0–1)	New Haven (2–1)	23.
24.	North Dakota	Arkansas Tech (0–1)	Winston–Salem State (2–0)	Central Oklahoma (1–2)	24.
25.	Nebraska–Kearney	New Haven (1–0)	Western Washington (1–1)	Central Missouri (3–0)	25.
	Preseason (Note: Although one was published, no preseason poll has been found. 23 of the 25 rankings are known, based on the first regular season poll.)	Week 1 Sept 5	Week 2 Sept 12	Week 3 Sept 19	
		Dropped: 12; 22	Dropped: 20 Nebraska–Kearney; 23 Texas A&M–Kingsville	Dropped: 24 Winston–Salem State	

== Midwest Region poll (Weeks 4 through 10) ==
	Week 4 Sept 26 (Note: The references for the Midwest Region weekly polls are also valid for the Northeast, South, & West region polls.)	Week 5 Oct 3	Week 6 Oct 10	Week 7 Oct 17	Week 8 Oct 24	Week 9 Oct 31	Week 10 Nov 7	
1.	Northwest Missouri State (4–0)	Northwest Missouri State (5–0)	Northwest Missouri State (6–0)	Northwest Missouri State (7–0)	Northwest Missouri State (8–0)	Northwest Missouri State (9–0)	Northwest Missouri State (10–0)	1.
2.	North Dakota State (4–0)	North Dakota State (5–0)	North Dakota State (6–0)	North Dakota State (7–0)	Nebraska–Omaha (7–1)	Nebraska–Omaha (8–1)	Nebraska–Omaha (9–1)	2.
3.	North Dakota (4–0)	South Dakota State (5–0)	North Dakota (5–1)	North Dakota (6–1)	North Dakota State (7–1)	North Dakota State (8–1)	North Dakota State (9–1)	3.
4.	Pittsburg State (3–1)	North Dakota (4–1)	Nebraska–Omaha (5–1)	Nebraska–Omaha (6–1)	North Dakota (7–1)	Pittsburg State (7–2)	Pittsburg State (8–2)	4.
5.	South Dakota State (4–0)	Nebraska–Omaha (4–1)	South Dakota State (5–1)	Pittsburg State (5–2)	Pittsburg State (6–2)	North Dakota (7–2)	North Dakota (8–2)	5.
6.	Nebraska–Omaha (3–1)	Central Missouri (4–1)	Pittsburg State (4–2)	Central Missouri (5–2)	South Dakota (5–3)	South Dakota (6–3)	South Dakota (7–3)	6.
7.	Central Missouri (3–1)	Minnesota–Duluth (5–0)	South Dakota (4–2)	South Dakota State (5–2)	Missouri Western State (5–3)	Missouri Western State (6–3)	Missouri Western State (7–3)	7.
8.	Minnesota–Duluth (4–0)	Missouri Western State (3–2)	Truman State (4–2)	South Dakota (4–3)	Augustana (SD) (5–3)	Augustana (SD) (6–3)	Winona State (8–2)	8.
9.	Bemidji State (4–0)	Pittsburg State (3–2)	Central Missouri (4–2)	Bemidji State (6–1)	Truman State (5–3)	Winona State (7–2)	Bemidji State (8–2)	9.
10.	Augustana (SD) (3–1)	Winona State (4–1)	Winona State (5–1)	Missouri Western State (4–3)	Winona State (6–2)	Minnesota–Duluth (7–2)	Central Missouri State (7–3)	10.
	Week 4 Sept 26 (Note: The references for the Midwest Region weekly polls are also valid for the Northeast, South, & West region polls.)	Week 5 Oct 3	Week 6 Oct 10	Week 7 Oct 17	Week 8 Oct 24	Week 9 Oct 31	Week 10 Nov 7	
		Dropped: 9 Bemidji State; 10 Augustana (SD)	Dropped: 7 Minnesota–Duluth; 8 Missouri Western State	Dropped: 8 Truman State; 10 Winona State	Dropped: 6 Central Missouri; 7 South Dakota State; 9 Bemidji State	Dropped: 9 Truman State	Dropped: 8 Augustana (SD); 10 Minnesota–Duluth	

== Northeast Region poll (Weeks 4 through 10) ==
	Week 4 Sept 26	Week 5 Oct 3	Week 6 Oct 10	Week 7 Oct 17	Week 8 Oct 24	Week 9 Oct 31	Week 10 Nov 7	
1.	IUP (3–0)	IUP (4–0)	Millersville (4–1)	Millersville (5–1)	Millersville (6–1)	Slippery Rock (7–2)	Slippery Rock (8–2)	1.
2.	Slippery Rock (3–1)	Millersville (3–1)	IUP (4–1)	IUP (5–1)	IUP (6–1)	Northwood (7–1)	Northwood (8–1)	2.
3.	Northwood (3–0)	Northern Michigan (4–1)	Slippery Rock (4–2)	Slippery Rock (5–2)	Slippery Rock (6–2)	Bloomsburg (7–2)	Bloomsburg (8–2)	3.
4.	East Stroudsburg (4–0)	Slippery Rock (3–2)	Northwood (4–1)	Northwood (5–1)	Northwood (6–1)	Millersville (6–2)	Saginaw Valley State (8–2)	4.
5.	Millersville (2–1)	Northwood (3–1)	Shepherd (4–1)	Bloomsburg (5–2)	Bloomsburg (6–2)	Saginaw Valley State (7–2)	IUP (7–2)	5.
6.	New Haven (2–2)	East Stroudsburg (4–1)	Saginaw Valley State (5–1)	New Haven (4–3)	New Haven (4–3)	Kutztown (7–2)	Millersville (6–3)	6.
7.	Northern Michigan (3–1)	Shepherd (3–1)	Bloomsburg (4–2)	Northern Michigan (5–2)	Northern Michigan (6–2)	IUP (6–2)	Kutztown (7–3)	7.
8.	Shepherd (2–1)	Saginaw Valley State (4–1)	New Haven (3–3)	Saginaw Valley State (5–2)	Saginaw Valley State (6–2)	Fairmont State (6–2)	Fairmont State (6–3)	8.
9.	Saginaw Valley State (3–1)	New Haven (2–3)	Northern Michigan (4–2)	Kutztown (5–2)	Kutztown (6–2)	Northern Michigan (5–3)	West Liberty State (7–2)	9.
10.	Michigan Tech (2–1)	Michigan Tech (3–1)	Kutztown (4–2)	Shepherd (5–1)	Fairmont State (4–3)	Shepherd (6–2)	New Haven (5–4)	10.
	Week 4 Sept 26	Week 5 Oct 3	Week 6 Oct 10	Week 7 Oct 17	Week 8 Oct 24	Week 9 Oct 31	Week 10 Nov 7	
		None	Dropped: 6 East Stroudsburg; 10 Michigan Tech	None	Dropped: 10 Shepherd	Dropped: 6 New Haven	Dropped: 9 Northern Michigan; 10 Shepherd	

== South Region poll (Weeks 4 through 10) ==
	Week 4 Sept 26	Week 5 Oct 3	Week 6 Oct 10	Week 7 Oct 17	Week 8 Oct 24	Week 9 Oct 31	Week 10 Nov 7	
1.	Carson–Newman (4–0)	Carson–Newman (5–0)	Catawba (6–0)	Catawba (7–0)	Catawba (7–0)	Catawba (8–0)	Catawba (9–0)	1.
2.	Catawba (4–0)	Catawba (5–0)	West Georgia (6–0)	West Georgia (7–0)	West Georgia (8–0)	West Georgia (9–0)	West Georgia (10–0)	2.
3.	Valdosta State (4–0)	Valdosta State (5–0)	Carson–Newman (5–1)	Carson–Newman (6–1)	Carson–Newman (7–1)	Delta State (9–0)	Valdosta State (9–1)	3.
4.	West Georgia (4–0)	West Georgia (5–0)	Delta State (6–0)	Delta State (7–0)	Delta State (8–0)	Valdosta State (8–1)	Tuskegee (9–0)	4.
5.	Southern Arkansas (2–1)	Southern Arkansas (3–1)	Winston–Salem State (5–1)	Winston–Salem State (6–1)	Valdosta State (7–1)	Tuskegee (8–0)	Delta State (9–0)	5.
6.	Winston–Salem State (3–1)	Winston–Salem State (4–1)	Valdosta State (5–1)	Valdosta State (6–1)	Arkansas–Monticello (7–1)	Presbyterian (6–2)	Presbyterian (7–2)	6.
7.	Fort Valley State (4–1)	Fort Valley State (5–1)	Fort Valley State (6–1)	Fort Valley State (7–1)	Tuskegee (7–0)	Carson–Newman (7–2)	Carson–Newman (8–2)	7.
8.	Delta State (4–0)	Delta State (5–0)	Virginia Union (5–1)	Tuskegee (6–0)	Presbyterian (5–2)	Winston–Salem State (7–2)	Winston–Salem State (8–2)	8.
9.	Virginia Union (3–1)	Virginia Union (4–1)	Tuskegee (5–0)	Arkansas–Monticello (6–1)	Virginia State (5–2)	Arkansas–Monticello (7–2)	Arkansas–Monticello (8–2)	9.
10.	Tuskegee (3–0)	Tuskegee (4–0)	Arkansas–Monticello (5–1)	Presbyterian (4–2)	Winston–Salem State (6–2)	Virginia Union (7–2)	Virginia Union (8–2)	10.
	Week 4 Sept 26	Week 5 Oct 3	Week 6 Oct 10	Week 7 Oct 17	Week 8 Oct 24	Week 9 Oct 31	Week 10 Nov 7	
		None	Dropped: 5 Southern Arkansas	Dropped: 8 Virginia Union	Dropped: 7 Fort Valley State	Dropped: 9 Virginia State	None	

== West Region poll (Weeks 4 through 10) ==
	Week 4 Sept 26	Week 5 Oct 3	Week 6 Oct 10	Week 7 Oct 17	Week 8 Oct 24	Week 9 Oct 31	Week 10 Nov 7	
1.	UC Davis (3–0)	UC Davis (4–0)	UC Davis (5–0)	UC Davis (6–0)	UC Davis (7–0)	UC Davis (8–0)	UC Davis (9–0)	1.
2.	Chadron State (3–1)	Western Washington (4–1)	Western Washington (5–1)	Western Washington (5–1)	Northeastern Oklahoma (6–1)	Northeastern Oklahoma (7–1)	Northeastern Oklahoma (8–1)	2.
3.	Western Washington (3–1)	Nebraska–Kearney (4–1)	Northeastern Oklahoma (4–1)	Northeastern Oklahoma (5–1)	Chadron State (6–2)	Mesa State (7–2)	Mesa State (8–2)	3.
4.	Nebraska–Kearney (3–1)	Angelo State (3–1)	Chadron State (4–2)	Chadron State (5–2)	Nebraska–Kearney (6–2)	Chadron State (6–2)	Chadron State (7–2)	4.
5.	Tarleton State (3–1)	Northeastern Oklahoma (3–1)	Southwestern State (OK) (4–1)	Nebraska–Kearney (5–2)	Mesa State (6–2)	Western Washington (6–2)	Western Washington (7–2)	5.
6.	Angelo State (2–1)	Chadron State (3–2)	Fort Hays State (4–1)	Mesa State (5–2)	Western Washington (5–2)	Southwestern State (OK) (6–2)	Nebraska–Kearney (6–3)	6.
7.	Northeastern Oklahoma (2–1)	Fort Hays State (4–1)	Nebraska–Kearney (4–2)	Angelo State (4–2)	Southwestern State (OK) (5–2)	Nebraska–Kearney (6–3)	Midwestern State (6–4)	7.
8.	Fort Hays State (3–1)	Southwestern State (OK) (3–1)	Tarleton State (4–2)	Fort Hays State (4–2)	Midwestern State (5–3)	Tarleton State (5–3)	Southwestern State (OK) (6–3)	8.
9.	Southwestern State (OK) (2–1)	Tarleton State (3–2)	Mesa State (4–2)	Southwestern State (OK) (4–2)	Tarleton State (5–3)	Midwestern State (5–4)	Western State (CO) (6–4)	9.
10.	West Texas A&M (2–1)	Western Oregon (3–2)	Angelo State (3–2)	Eastern New Mexico (4–3)	Western Oregon (5–3)	Western Oregon (5–4)	Eastern New Mexico (6–4)	10.
	Week 4 Sept 26	Week 5 Oct 3	Week 6 Oct 10	Week 7 Oct 17	Week 8 Oct 24	Week 9 Oct 31	Week 10 Nov 7	
		Dropped: 10 West Texas A&M	Dropped: 10 Western Oregon	Dropped: 8 Tarleton State	Dropped: 7 Angelo State; 8 Fort Hays State; 10 Eastern New Mexico	None	Dropped: 8 Tarleton State; 10 Western Oregon	
