= Frank Sheptock =

American football player and coach (born 1963)

Current position
- Title: Head coach
- Team: Bloomsburg
- Conference: PSAC
- Record: 19–35

Biographical details
- Born: November 27, 1963 (age 62); Shamokin, Pennsylvania, U.S.

Playing career
- 1982–1985: Bloomsburg
- Position: Linebacker

Coaching career (HC unless noted)
- 1990–1995: Wilkes (assistant)
- 1996–2013: Wilkes
- 2015: Bloomsburg (DL)
- 2016–2018: Berwick Area Senior HS (PA)
- 2019: Misericordia (DC)
- 2020–present: Bloomsburg

Administrative career (AD unless noted)
- 2014–2019: Berwick Area Senior HS (PA)

Head coaching record
- Overall: 126–116 (college); 27–11 (high school)
- Bowls: 2–4
- Tournaments: 1–2 (NCAA D-III playoffs)

Accomplishments and honors

Championships
- 1 MAC (2006)
- College Football Hall of Fame; Inducted in 2007 (profile)

Frank Sheptock (born November 27, 1963) is an American college football coach and former player. He is the head football coach for Bloomsburg University of Pennsylvania, a position he has held since 2020. Sheptock played college football as a linebacker at Bloomsburg, where he set the school record for most tackles in a game (23) and most career tackles (537). Sheptock served as the head football coach at Wilkes University in Wilkes-Barre, Pennsylvania from 1996 to 2013, compiling a record of 107–81. He was the head football coach at Berwick Area Senior High School in Berwick, Pennsylvania from 2016 to 2018, tallying a mark of 27–11. Sheptock was inducted into the College Football Hall of Fame as a player in 2007.

== Head coaching record ==
=== College ===
Year	Team	Overall	Conference	Standing	Bowl/playoffs
Wilkes Colonels (Middle Atlantic Conference) (1996–present)
1996	Wilkes	8–3	3–1	2nd (Freedom)	L Southwest
1997	Wilkes	5–5	3–1	2nd (Freedom)	
1998	Wilkes	5–4	3–1	2nd (Freedom)	
1999	Wilkes	7–4	3–1	2nd (Freedom)	W Southeast
2000	Wilkes	5–6	2–2	3rd (Freedom)	L Southwest
2001	Wilkes	4–6	4–5	T–4th	
2002	Wilkes	7–4	5–4	T–4th	W South Atlantic
2003	Wilkes	8–3	7–2	T–2nd	L Southwest
2004	Wilkes	6–4	6–3	T–3rd	
2005	Wilkes	8–3	8–1	2nd	L NCAA Division III First Round
2006	Wilkes	11–1	9–0	1st	L NCAA Division III Second Round
2007	Wilkes	4–6	4–3	4th	
2008	Wilkes	4–6	4–3	T–4th	
2009	Wilkes	6–5	3–4	T–4th	
2010	Wilkes	6–5	5–2	T–2nd	L Southeast
2011	Wilkes	4–5	4–4	T–5th	
2012	Wilkes	5–5	4–5	6th	
2013	Wilkes	4–6	3–6	T–7th	
Wilkes:		107–81	80–48		
Bloomsburg Huskies (Pennsylvania State Athletic Conference) (2020–present)
2020–21	No team—COVID-19				
2021	Bloomsburg	3–8	2–5	6th (East)	
2022	Bloomsburg	4–7	2–5	7th (East)	
2023	Bloomsburg	3–7	2–5	T–6th (East)	
2024	Bloomsburg	6–5	4–3	T–3rd (East)	
2025	Bloomsburg	3–8	1–6	7th (East)	
Bloomsburg:		19–35	11–25		
Total:		126–116			
National championship Conference title Conference division title or championship game berth

=== High school ===
Year	Team	Overall	Conference	Standing	Bowl/playoffs
Berwick Bulldogs () (2016–2018)
2016	Berwick	8–5	4–2	3rd	
2017	Berwick	10–3	5–1	1st	
2018	Berwick	9–3	3–1	2nd	
Berwick:		27–11	12–4		
Total:		27–11			
National championship Conference title Conference division title or championship game berth
