= 2000 Tuskegee Golden Tigers football team =

American college football season

2000 Tuskegee Golden Tigers football

Black college national champion SIAC champion

Pioneer Bowl, W 12–9 vs. Winston-Salem State
- Conference: Southern Intercollegiate Athletic Conference

Ranking
- AFCA: No. 4 (South Region)
- Record: 12–0 (7–0 SIAC)
- Head coach: Rick Comegy (5th season)
- Home stadium: Abbott Memorial Alumni Stadium

2000 Southern Intercollegiate Athletic Conference football standings
	Conf.			Overall
Team	W		L	W		L
No. 4 Tuskegee $	7	–	0	12	–	0
Morehouse	5	–	2	8	–	3
Fort Valley State	5	–	2	7	–	4
Albany State	3	–	4	4	–	6
Clark Atlanta	3	–	4	4	–	6
Miles	2	–	5	4	–	6
Lane	2	–	5	3	–	8
Kentucky State	1	–	6	4	–	7
$ – Conference champion; Rankings from AFCA South Region poll

The 2000 Tuskegee Golden Tigers football team represented Tuskegee University as a member of the Southern Intercollegiate Athletic Conference (SIAC) during the 2000 NCAA Division II football season. Led by fifth-year head coach Rick Comegy, the Golden Tigers compiled an overall record of 12–0, with a conference record of 7–0, and finished as SIAC champion. At the conclusion of the season, the Golden Tigers were also recognized as black college national champion.

== Schedule ==
Date	Opponent	Site	Result	Source
September 9	Morris Brown*	Abbott Memorial Alumni Stadium; Tuskegee, AL	W 23–9	
September 16	Miles	Abbott Memorial Alumni Stadium; Tuskegee, AL	W 21–13	
September 23	Johnson C. Smith*	Abbott Memorial Alumni Stadium; Tuskegee, AL	W 48–0	
September 30	Kentucky State	Abbott Memorial Alumni Stadium; Tuskegee, AL	W 41–10	
October 7	Albany State	Abbott Memorial Alumni Stadium; Tuskegee, AL	W 34–21	
October 14	vs. Morehouse	Memorial Stadium; Columbus, GA (Tuskegee–Morehouse Football Classic)	W 28–14	
October 21	at Fort Valley State	Wildcat Stadium; Fort Valley, GA	W 38–35	
October 28	vs. Clark Atlanta	Callaway Stadium; LaGrange, GA	W 23–0	
November 4	Lane^{†}	Abbott Memorial Alumni Stadium; Tuskegee, AL	W 49–7	
November 11	at Savannah State	Ted Wright Stadium; Savannah, GA	W 21–0	
November 23	at Alabama State*	Cramton Bowl; Montgomery, AL (Turkey Day Classic)	W 28–27	
December 16	vs. Winston-Salem State*	Georgia Dome; Atlanta, GA (Pioneer Bowl)	W 12–9	
*Non-conference game; ^{†}Homecoming
