= 2000 UC Davis Aggies football team =

American college football season

2000 UC Davis Aggies football

NCAA Division II Semifinal, L 48–58 vs. Bloomsburg
- Conference: Independent

Ranking
- AFCA: No. 1 (West)
- Record: 12–1
- Head coach: Bob Biggs (8th season)
- Offensive coordinator: Mike Moroski (8th season)
- Home stadium: Toomey Field

2000 NCAA Division II independents football records
	Conf.			Overall
Team	W		L	W		L
No. 1 (West) UC Davis ^		–		12	–	1
No. 10 (Northeast) New Haven		–		5	–	5
Kentucky Wesleyan		–		4	–	6
Gannon		–		3	–	7
Saint Joseph's (IN)		–		2	–	8
Quincy		–		1	–	9
Western New Mexico		–		1	–	9
Oklahoma Panhandle State		–		1	–	10
^ – NCAA Division II playoff participant; Rankings from AFCA poll

The 2000 UC Davis football team represented the University of California, Davis as an independent during the 2000 NCAA Division II football season. Led by eighth-year head coach Bob Biggs, UC Davis compiled an overall record of 12–1. 2000 was the 31st consecutive winning season for the Aggies. UC Davis was ranked No. 1 in West Region of the NCAA Division II poll at the end of the regular season and advanced to the NCAA Division II Football Championship playoffs for the fifth straight year. The Aggies defeated Chadron State, ranked fourth in the West Region, in the first round and Mesa State, ranked third in West, in the quarterfinals before losing in semifinal round to the third-ranked team in the Northeast Region, Bloomsburg. The team averaged 48 points per game, outscoring their opponents 622 to 258 for the season. The Aggies played home games at Toomey Field in Davis, California.

== Schedule ==
Date	Opponent	Rank	Site	Result	Attendance	Source
September 2	New Mexico Highlands	No. 4	Toomey Field; Davis, CA	W 55–7		
September 9	Eastern Oregon	No. 4	Toomey Field; Davis, CA	W 52–13		
September 16	at West Chester	No. 4	John A. Farrell Stadium; West Chester, PA	W 45–0		
September 30	Saint Mary's	No. 1 (West)	Toomey Field; Davis, CA	W 55–14		
October 7	at No. 10 (West) Western Oregon	No. 1 (West)	McArthur Field; Monmouth, OR	W 59–28		
October 14	Southern Utah	No. 1 (West)	Toomey Field; Davis, CA	W 56–20		
October 21	at Cal Poly	No. 1 (West)	Mustang Stadium; San Luis Obispo, CA (rivalry)	W 63–28		
October 28	at Sacramento State	No. 1 (West)	Charles C. Hughes Stadium; Sacramento, CA (Causeway Classic)	W 13–10	9,700	
November 4	at Central Washington	No. 1 (West)	Tomlinson Stadium; Ellensburg, WA	W 31–24		
November 11	at No. 5 (West) Western Washington	No. 1 (West)	Civic Stadium; Bellingham, WA	W 35–28		
November 18	No. 4 (West) Chadron State	No. 1 (West)	Toomey Field; Davis, CA (NCAA Division II First Round)	W 48–10		
November 25	No. 3 (West) Mesa State	No. 1 (West)	Toomey Field; Davis, CA (NCAA Division II Quarterfinal)	W 62–18		
November 25	No. 3 (Northeast) Bloomsburg	No. 1 (West)	Davis, CA (NCAA Division II Semifinal)	L 48–58		
Rankings from AFCA Poll released prior to the game

== NFL draft ==
The following UC Davis Aggies players were selected in the 2001 NFL draft.

Player	Position	Round	Overall	NFL team
Onome Ojo	Wide receiver	5	153	New Orleans Saints
