= 2001 Tuskegee Golden Tigers football team =

American college football season

2001 Tuskegee Golden Tigers football

Black college national champion SIAC co-champion

Pioneer Bowl, W 28–0 vs. Virginia Union
- Conference: Southern Intercollegiate Athletic Conference

Ranking
- AFCA: No. 9
- Record: 11–1 (6–1 SIAC)
- Head coach: Rick Comegy (6th season)
- Home stadium: Abbott Memorial Alumni Stadium

2001 Southern Intercollegiate Athletic Conference football standings
	Conf.			Overall
Team	W		L	W		L
No. 9 Tuskegee +	6	–	1	11	–	1
Morehouse +	6	–	1	8	–	2
No. 21 Fort Valley State +	6	–	1	8	–	3
Albany State	3	–	4	4	–	6
Miles	3	–	4	4	–	7
Kentucky State	2	–	5	3	–	8
Lane	1	–	6	3	–	7
Clark Atlanta	1	–	6	1	–	10
+ – Conference co-champions; Rankings from AFCA poll

The 2001 Tuskegee Golden Tigers football team represented Tuskegee University as a member of the Southern Intercollegiate Athletic Conference (SIAC) during the 2001 NCAA Division II football season. Led by sixth-year head coach Rick Comegy, the Golden Tigers compiled an overall record of 11–1, with a conference record of 6–1, and finished as SIAC co-champion. At the conclusion of the season, the Golden Tigers were also recognized as black college national champion.

== Schedule ==
Date	Opponent	Site	Result	Source
September 1	Winston-Salem State*	Abbott Memorial Alumni Stadium; Tuskegee, AL	W 30–23	
September 8	at Morris Brown*	Herndon Stadium; Atlanta, GA	W 33–16	
September 22	Edward Waters*	Abbott Memorial Alumni Stadium; Tuskegee, AL	W 71–0	
October 6	at Albany State	Hugh Mills Stadium; Albany, GA	W 35–15	
October 13	vs. Morehouse	Memorial Stadium; Columbus, GA (Tuskegee–Morehouse Football Classic)	L 3–14	
October 20	Fort Valley State	Abbott Memorial Alumni Stadium; Tuskegee, AL	W 35–28	
October 27	Clark Atlanta^{†}	Abbott Memorial Alumni Stadium; Tuskegee, AL	W 56–7	
November 3	at Lane	Rothrock Stadium; Jackson, TN	W 35–0	
November 10	Kentucky State	Abbott Memorial Alumni Stadium; Tuskegee, AL	W 62–3	
November 17	at Miles	Albert J. Sloan–Alumni Stadium; Fairfield, AL	W 23–12	
November 22	at Alabama State*	Cramton Bowl; Montgomery, AL (Turkey Day Classic)	W 31–27	
December 22	vs. Virginia Union*	Georgia Dome; Atlanta, GA (Pioneer Bowl)	W 28–0	
*Non-conference game; ^{†}Homecoming
