= 2000 Delta State Statesmen football team =

American college football season

2000 Delta State Statesmen football

NCAA Division II champion GSC co-champion

NCAA Division II Championship Game, W 63–34 vs. Bloomsburg
- Conference: Gulf South Conference
- Record: 14–1 (8–1 GSC)
- Head coach: Steve Campbell (2nd season)
- Defensive coordinator: Gwaine Mathews (2nd season)
- Home stadium: McCool Stadium

2000 Gulf South Conference football standings
	Conf.			Overall
Team	W		L	W		L
No. 5 Delta State +^	8	–	1	14	–	1
No. 3 Valdosta State +^	8	–	1	10	–	2
No. 2 West Georgia +^	8	–	1	10	–	2
Arkansas Tech	7	–	2	7	–	3
No. 9 Arkansas–Monticello	6	–	3	8	–	3
Southern Arkansas	4	–	5	5	–	5
Harding	4	–	5	5	–	6
North Alabama	3	–	6	3	–	7
Central Arkansas	2	–	7	3	–	8
West Alabama	2	–	7	3	–	8
Ouachita Baptist	2	–	7	2	–	8
Henderson State	0	–	9	1	–	10
+ – Conference co-champions; ^ – NCAA Division II playoff participant; Rankings from AFCA South Region poll

The 2000 Delta State Statesmen football team was an American football team that represented Delta State University (DSU) as a member of the Gulf South Conference (GSC) during the 2000 NCAA Division II football season. In their second year under head coach Steve Campbell, the team compiled a 14–1 record (8–1 against conference opponents) and tied with Valdosta State for the GSC championship. The Statesmen advanced to the NCAA Division II playoffs and defeated Bloomsburg in the championship game.

Quarterback Josh Bright became the first college quarterback in Mississippi to both rush and pass for over 1,000 yards in a single season and received the Conerly Trophy as the best college football player in Mississippi. The team's other statistical leaders included tailback Rico McDonald and wide receiver Jason Franklin.

The team played its home games at McCool Stadium in Cleveland, Mississippi.

== Schedule ==
Date	Opponent	Site	Result	Attendance	Source
September 2	vs. Belhaven*	Mississippi Veterans Memorial Stadium; Jackson, MS (Salvation Army Football Classic)	W 55–18	4,000	
September 9	at Mississippi Valley State*	Rice–Totten Stadium; Itta Bena, MS	W 35–23	6,900-7,100	
September 16	at West Alabama	Tiger Stadium; Livingston, AL	W 33–8	5,100	
September 23	North Alabama	McCool Stadium; Cleveland, MS	W 42–35	5,777	
September 30	Harding	McCool Stadium; Cleveland, MS	W 43–35	2,032	
October 7	at Valdosta State	Bazemore–Hyder Stadium; Valdosta, GA	W 45–34	7,347	
October 14	at Southern Arkansas	Wilkins Stadium; Magnolia, AR	W 30–28	4,825	
October 21	Henderson State	McCool Stadium; Cleveland, MS	W 48–24	6,543	
October 28	at Central Arkansas	Estes Stadium; Conway, AR	W 52–21	3,807	
November 4	at Arkansas Tech	Thone Stadium; Russellville, AR	L 10–24	1,334	
November 9	Arkansas–Monticello	McCool Stadium; Cleveland, MS	W 47–10	4,654	
November 18	Valdosta State*	McCool Stadium; Cleveland, MS (NCAA Division II first round)	W 49–12		
November 25	at Catawba*	Shuford Stadium; Salisbury, NC (NCAA Division II quarterfinal)	W 20–14	1,612	
December 2	North Dakota State*	McCool Stadium; Cleveland, MS (NCAA Division II seminfinal)	W 34–16	6,850	
December 9	vs. Bloomsburg*	Braly Municipal Stadium; Florence, AL (NCAA Division II Championship Game)	W 63–34	7,123	
*Non-conference game
