= Pioneer Bowl (HBCU) =

Pioneer Bowl (defunct)
- Logo for the 2012 game
- Stadium: A. J. McClung Memorial Stadium (2010–2012); Charlie W. Johnson Stadium (2007–2009); Memorial Stadium (2005–2006); Ladd–Peebles Stadium (2004); Georgia Dome (1999–2003); Herndon Stadium (1997–1998)
- Location: Columbus, Georgia (2010–2012); Columbia, South Carolina (2007–2009); Charlotte, North Carolina (2005–2006); Mobile, Alabama (2004); Atlanta, Georgia (1997–2003)
- Operated: 1997–2012 (no game 2002 & 2008)
- Conference tie-ins: CIAA & SIAC (1997–2012)

The Pioneer Bowl was an annual American NCAA Division II college football bowl game contested between NCAA Division II teams from the Central Intercollegiate Athletic Association (CIAA) and Southern Intercollegiate Athletic Conference (SIAC), two athletic conferences traditionally consisting of historically black colleges and universities (HBCUs). Between 1997 and 2012, the game was played 14 times in five different cities in the South.

== History ==
The Pioneer Bowl was created in January 1997 to match teams from the CIAA and SIAC that did not qualify for the NCAA Division II National Football Championship playoffs. It was first contested that December, ending a period of eleven seasons (1986–1996) in which no Division II postseason game had carried the "bowl" designation. The Pioneer Bowl ushered in a new era of Division II bowl games which, by the 2012 season, grew to include four other games, all of which are also now defunct: the Mineral Water Bowl (2000–2019), Dixie Rotary Bowl (2006–2008), Kanza Bowl (2009–2012), and C.H.A.M.P.S. Heart of Texas Bowl (2012–2018).

The Pioneer Bowl was held 14 times in 16 years (with cancellations in 2002 and 2008). The SIAC won nine of the games and the CIAA five. The bowl only included champions of the CIAA or SIAC when those schools failed to meet the criteria for postseason playoff bids (a possibility throughout the history of the bowl, because the Division II football postseason had no automatic qualifiers until 2025). A perennial exception was Tuskegee, whose traditional regular season finale against Alabama State in the Turkey Day Classic on Thanksgiving Day came after the first round of the playoffs. The Pioneer Bowl thus served as Tuskegee's only postseason opportunity in several cases when it would have qualified for the Division II playoffs, most notably in 2000 and 2007, seasons in which the Golden Tigers finished a perfect 12–0. Overall, Tuskegee appeared in the bowl ten times, winning seven.

Throughout its history, the Pioneer Bowl suffered from instability with promoters, sponsors, and venues. Its fourteen games were held in six stadiums in five cities, across four states. The first six contests were in Atlanta, two at Herndon Stadium on the campus of Morris Brown College, then four at the Georgia Dome, home of the Atlanta Falcons. After one year in Mobile, Alabama, the bowl was played twice in Charlotte, North Carolina and twice in Columbia, South Carolina, before the CIAA and SIAC signed a three-year contract to hold the game in Columbus, Georgia from 2010 through 2012.

The 2013 game was to be played on the home field of the CIAA representative but was cancelled on short notice "due to budgetary restraints." In 2014, the two conferences again waited until November before cancelling the game, issuing a joint statement: "While the Pioneer Bowl stands as the longest running bowl game in the history of black colleges and a national showcase for student-athletes, we decided that it is in the best interest of our membership, fans and student-athletes to not hold the game this year. We are currently undecided if we will reinstate the Pioneer Bowl game in the future." The game was never played again.

The CIAA–SIAC postseason rivalry was revived in 2023 with the creation of the Florida Beach Bowl.

== Game results ==
Winning teams and their scores appear in bold font.

Date played	SIAC team		CIAA team		Venue	Location
December 20, 1997	**Kentucky State**	**30**	Livingstone	26	Herndon Stadium	Atlanta, Georgia
December 19, 1998	**Tuskegee**	**23**	Livingstone	9	Herndon Stadium	Atlanta, Georgia
December 18, 1999	Tuskegee	7	**Winston-Salem State**	**23**	Georgia Dome	Atlanta, Georgia
December 16, 2000	**Tuskegee**	**12**	Winston-Salem State	9	Georgia Dome	Atlanta, Georgia
December 22, 2001	**Tuskegee**	**28**	Virginia Union	0	Georgia Dome	Atlanta, Georgia
2002	Cancelled					
December 20, 2003	**Albany State**	**52**	Fayetteville State	30	Georgia Dome	Atlanta, Georgia
December 4, 2004	Tuskegee	28	**Shaw**	**30**	Ladd–Peebles Stadium	Mobile, Alabama
December 3, 2005	**Tuskegee**	**28**	Bowie State	26	Memorial Stadium	Charlotte, North Carolina
December 2, 2006	**Tuskegee**	**17**	Johnson C. Smith	7	Memorial Stadium	Charlotte, North Carolina
December 1, 2007	**Tuskegee**	**58**	Virginia Union	51	Charlie W. Johnson Stadium	Columbia, South Carolina
2008	Cancelled					
December 5, 2009	**Tuskegee**	**21**	Elizabeth City State	7	Charlie W. Johnson Stadium	Columbia, South Carolina
December 4, 2010	Fort Valley State	9	**St. Augustine's**	**20**	A. J. McClung Stadium	Columbus, Georgia
December 3, 2011	Miles	33	**Johnson C. Smith**	**35**	A. J. McClung Stadium	Columbus, Georgia
December 4, 2012	Tuskegee	13	**Elizabeth City State**	**28**	A. J. McClung Stadium	Columbus, Georgia

Of the 14 games played, SIAC teams won 9 and CIAA teams won 5.

=== Cancelled games ===
Date scheduled	SIAC team	CIAA team	Venue	Location	Ref.
December 15, 2002	Tuskegee	Bowie State	Raymond James Stadium	Tampa, Florida	
December 6, 2008	Tuskegee		Charlie W. Johnson Stadium	Columbia, South Carolina	
December 7, 2013	Albany State				
2014					

== See also ==
- List of college bowl games
- Heritage Bowl, a contemporary HBCU bowl game, which operated from 1991 to 1999
- Celebration Bowl, a current bowl game for HBCUs within the Football Championship Subdivision
- Florida Beach Bowl, a bowl game for CIAA and SIAC teams, held in 2023
