= Bicentennial Bowl =

Bicentennial Bowl (defunct)
- Program cover for the 1976 game
- Stadium: War Memorial Stadium (1975); City Stadium (1976)
- Location: Little Rock, Arkansas (1975); Richmond, Virginia (1976)
- Operated: 1975, 1976

Bicentennial Bowl was the name of two different postseason bowl games played in the United States after the 1975 and 1976 college football seasons. The games were held in different venues; first in Little Rock, Arkansas, and then in Richmond, Virginia. The bowls were named after the United States Bicentennial.

== History ==
Bicentennial Bowl results are listed in NCAA records as two independent games, not a bowl series, and the games were not NCAA-sanctioned events.

=== 1975 game ===
The 1975 game matched teams from the Arkansas Intercollegiate Conference and Oklahoma Intercollegiate Conference, and was considered an NAIA "special event." It was contested at War Memorial Stadium in Little Rock, Arkansas.

The Ouachita Baptist Tigers opted not to participate in the game, in hopes of playing in the 1975 NAIA postseason.

| Season | Date | Winner | | Loser | | Venue | Att. (est.) |
|---|---|---|---|---|---|---|---|
| 1975 | November 29, 1975 | Henderson State | 27 | East Central (OK) | 14 | War Memorial Stadium – Little Rock, Arkansas | 2,000 |

MVPs: Willie Guient (TE, East Central) and Johnny Gross (DT, Henderson State)

=== 1976 game ===
The 1976 game matched teams from the Central Intercollegiate Athletic Association (CIAA) and the Mid-Eastern Athletic Conference (MEAC). It was played in Richmond, Virginia, at City Stadium. The game had originally been planned for December 4, in Charlotte, North Carolina, but was rescheduled for December 11, and moved, to allow for television coverage.

| Season | Date | Winner | | Loser | | Venue | Att. (est.) |
|---|---|---|---|---|---|---|---|
| 1976 | December 11, 1976 | South Carolina State | 26 | Norfolk State | 10 | City Stadium – Richmond, Virginia | 7,500 |

MVPs: Ricky Anderson (FB, South Carolina State) and Jerry Curry (RG, Norfolk State)

After 1976 the game was rebranded as the Gold Bowl, and was played four more times. Each of the five bowls played in Richmond during 1976–1980 featured teams from the CIAA and MEAC.

== See also ==
- List of college bowl games
