= 2000 North Dakota State Bison football team =

American college football season

2000 North Dakota State Bison football

NCAA Division II Semifinal, L 16–34 at Delta State
- Conference: North Central Conference
- Record: 12–2 (8–1 NCC)
- Head coach: Bob Babich (4th season)
- Offensive scheme: Multiple
- Defensive coordinator: Gus Bradley (4th season)
- Base defense: 4–3
- Home stadium: Fargodome

2000 North Central Conference football standings
	Conf.			Overall
Team	W		L	W		L
No. 2 Nebraska–Omaha $^	9	–	0	11	–	2
No. 3 North Dakota State ^	8	–	1	12	–	2
No. 5 North Dakota	6	–	3	8	–	3
No. 6 South Dakota	6	–	3	8	–	3
Augustana (SD)	5	–	4	7	–	4
South Dakota State	4	–	5	6	–	5
Northern Colorado	3	–	6	4	–	7
Minnesota State	3	–	6	3	–	8
St. Cloud State	1	–	8	1	–	9
Morningside	0	–	9	1	–	10
$ – Conference champion; ^ – NCAA Division II playoff participant; Rankings from AFCA Midwest Region poll

The 2000 North Dakota State Bison football team was an American football team that represented North Dakota State University during the 2000 NCAA Division II football season as a member of the North Central Conference. In their fourth year under head coach Bob Babich, the team compiled a 12–2 record.

== Schedule ==
Date	Opponent	Rank	Site	Result	Source
August 31	No. 10 Texas A&M–Kingsville*	No. 3	Fargodome; Fargo, ND	W 52–7	
September 9	Minnesota State–Moorhead*	No. 3	Fargodome; Fargo, ND	W 80–0	
September 16	at St. Cloud State	No. 3	Selke Field; St. Cloud, MN	W 37–7	
September 23	South Dakota	No. 3	Fargodome; Fargo, ND	W 45–10	
September 30	No. 3 (Midwest) North Dakota	No. 2 (Midwest)	Fargodome; Fargo, ND (Nickel Trophy)	W 16–13	
October 7	at Augustana (SD)	No. 2 (Midwest)	Howard Wood Field; Sioux Falls, SD	W 24–20	
October 14	No. 5 (Midwest) South Dakota State^{†}	No. 2 (Midwest)	Fargodome; Fargo, ND (rivalry)	W 21–3	
October 21	at No. 4 (Midwest) Nebraska–Omaha	No. 2 (Midwest)	Al F. Caniglia Field; Omaha, NE	L 3–6	
October 28	at Minnesota State	No. 3 (Midwest)	Blakeslee Stadium; Mankato, MN	W 41–28	
November 4	Northern Colorado	No. 3 (Midwest)	Fargodome; Fargo, ND	W 38–14	
November 11	Morningside	No. 3 (Midwest)	Fargodome; Fargo, ND	W 55–14	
November 18	at No. 1 (Midwest) Northwest Missouri State*	No. 3 (Midwest)	Bearcat Stadium; Maryville, MO (NCAA Division II First Round)	W 31–17	
November 25	at No. 2 (Midwest) Nebraska–Omaha	No. 3 (Midwest)	Al F. Caniglia Field; Omaha, NE (NCAA Division II Quarterfinal)	W 43–21	
December 2	at No. 5 (South) Delta State*	No. 3 (Midwest)	McCool Stadium; Cleveland, MS (NCAA Division II Semifinal)	L 16–34	
*Non-conference game; ^{†}Homecoming; Rankings from AFCA Poll released prior to the game
