= Nebraska–Omaha Mavericks football =

- First season: 1911; 115 years ago
- Last season: 2010; 16 years ago
- Location: Omaha, Nebraska
- Stadium: Al F. Caniglia Field (capacity: 3,097)
- NCAA division: Division II
- Colors: Crimson and black
- All-time record: 440–382–27 (.534)
- Bowl record: 2–1 (.667)

Conference championships
- 13
- Website: omavs.com

The Nebraska–Omaha Mavericks football team represented the University of Nebraska Omaha in NCAA Division II college football, and played its first season in 1911. They competed in the Mid-America Intercollegiate Athletic Association (MIAA) during their last season in 2010 and played home games on campus at Al F. Caniglia Field in Omaha, Nebraska.

On March 25, 2011, the university's board of regents voted to disband the team in order to save money for the athletic program, which was transitioning to Division I. (Disputed by ESPN; see link below)

== Conference affiliations ==
- 1911–1932: Independent
- 1933–1941: North Central Conference
- 1947–1958: Independent
- 1959–1968: Central Intercollegiate Athletic Conference
- 1969–1971: Rocky Mountain Athletic Conference
- 1972: Great Plains Athletic Conference
- 1973–1976: Independent
- 1977–2007: North Central Conference
- 2008–2010: Mid-America Intercollegiate Athletics Association

== Conference championships ==
The Mavericks won 13 conference championships in 1962, 1963, 1965, 1967, 1968, 1983, 1984, 1996, 1998, 2000, 2004, 2005, 2006, and 2007.

== NCAA playoff appearances ==
=== NCAA Division II ===
The Mavericks appeared in the Division II playoffs ten times with an overall record of 2–10.

Year	Round	Opponent	Result
1978	Quarterfinals	Youngstown State	L, 14–21
1984	Quarterfinals; Semifinals	NW Missouri State; North Dakota State	W, 28–15; L, 14–25
1996	First Round	NW Missouri State	L, 21–22
1998	First Round	NW Missouri State	L, 14–28
2000	First Round; Quarterfinals	Pittsburg State; North Dakota State	W, 14–13; L, 21–43
2001	First Round	Pittsburg State	L, 7–20
2005	Second Round	Saginaw Valley State	L, 21–24
2006	Second Round	North Dakota	L, 35–38
2007	Second Round	Central Washington	L, 17–20
2008	First Round	Pittsburg State	L, 21–33

== Bowl games ==
The Mavericks played in three NCAA-sanctioned bowl games with a record of 2–1.

Season	Coach	Bowl	Opponent	Result
1955	Lloyd Cardwell	Tangerine Bowl	Eastern Kentucky	W 7–6
1962	Al Caniglia	All Sports Bowl	East Central	W 34–21
2009	Pat Behrns	Kanza Bowl	West Texas A&M	L 25–31

== College Football Hall of Fame ==
- Marlin Briscoe, quarterback, inducted in 2016
