= Florida Beach Bowl =

NCAA Division II football bowl game

Florida Beach Bowl (defunct)
- Stadium: DRV PNK Stadium
- Location: Fort Lauderdale, Florida, U.S.
- Operated: 2023
- Conference tie-ins: CIAA, SIAC
- Website: floridabeachbowl.com

Sponsors
- Amerant Bank (2023)

The Florida Beach Bowl was an American college football bowl game contested between NCAA Division II teams from the Central Intercollegiate Athletic Association (CIAA) and Southern Intercollegiate Athletic Conference (SIAC), two athletic conferences traditionally consisting of historically black colleges and universities (HBCUs). The lone edition of the bowl was played on December 13, 2023, at DRV PNK Stadium in Fort Lauderdale, Florida. For the 2023 season, the Florida Beach Bowl was one of four Division II sanctioned bowl games, along with the Live United Texarkana Bowl, America's Crossroads Bowl, and Heritage Bowl.

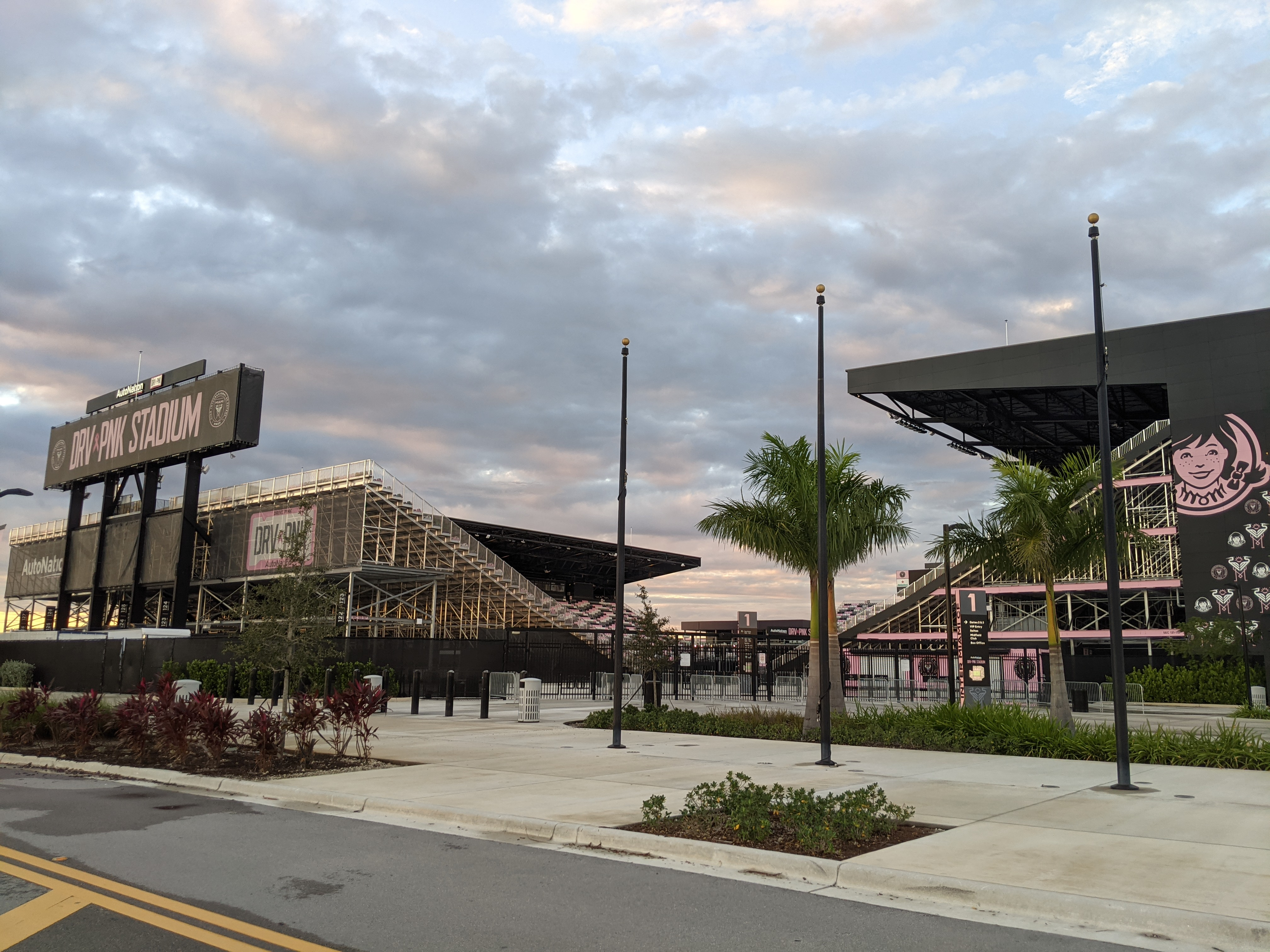
DRV PNK Stadium in November 2021

== History ==
The game was announced in September 2023 by organizers and officials with Inter Miami CF, operators of the host stadium. Urban Edge Network (UEN) was subsequently announced as the broadcaster for the bowl, and Amerant Bank as the official sponsor.

The Florida Beach Bowl was intended to revive the CIAA–SIAC postseason matchup of the defunct Pioneer Bowl, contested from 1997 to 2012. Selection standards included a record of at least six wins, for teams not invited to participate in the NCAA Division II Football Championship playoffs. Victor Robenson, bowl CEO, revealed the ultimate goal of having the game match the champions of the two conferences in a Black college championship for Division II, similar to the way the Celebration Bowl functions as the Black college title game for the Division I Football Championship Subdivision (FCS).

On November 4, 2024, sources within the CIAA and SIAC confirmed the Florida Beach Bowl would not be held in 2024, revealing that "funding was an issue as the bowl looked to build off of its inaugural game." Months after the bowl died a quiet death, CIAA commissioner Jacquie McWilliams-Parker offered a post-mortem in which she commented on the problems of HBCU institutions and conferences in dealing with "third-party partnerships" and overly-ambitious promoters. Game organizers had planned six days of events, including a golf tournament, 5k run, prayer brunch, coaches luncheon, and media day, all of which were poorly attended.

== Game results ==
Date played	Winning team		Losing team		notes
December 13, 2023	Fort Valley State (SIAC)	23	Johnson C. Smith (CIAA)	10	
