= Charlie W. Johnson Stadium =

Stadium in Columbia, South Carolina

Coordinates: 34.018238°N 81.010646°W

Johnson Stadium
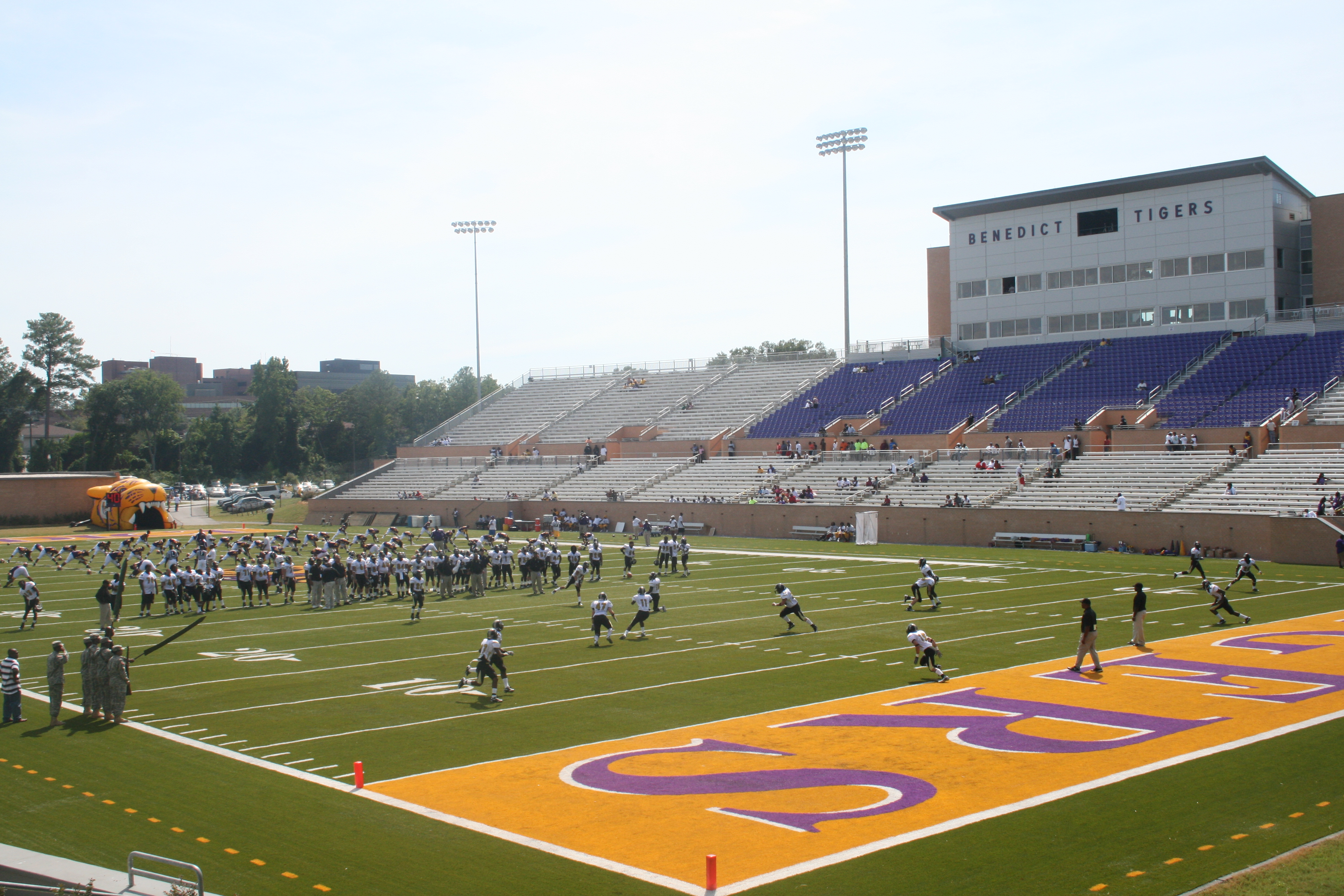
- The stadium in 2009
- Interactive map of Johnson Stadium
- Full name: Charlie W. Johnson Stadium
- Location: Columbia, South Carolina
- Capacity: 11,000
- Surface: Artificial Turf (Shaw Momentum HP)

Construction
- Built: 2006
- Opened: 2006; 20 years ago
- Renovated: 2019
- Cost: $12 million
- Architects: McMillian Smith & Partners

Tenant
- Benedict Tigers (2006–present)

Website
- benedict.edu/johnsonstadium

Charlie W. Johnson Stadium is a stadium in Columbia, South Carolina. It is primarily used for American football, and is the home field of Benedict College. The stadium has also been host of the South Carolina High School League's Class 1A football state championship games since 2010 and was also the host of the Class 2A games from 2011 to 2013. The stadium holds 11,000 people; it opened in 2006. It underwent renovations in the summer of 2019, with new field turn, new scoreboard (25 feet by 43 feet), landscaping, new roofs on field house and press box, upgraded President's Suite level.
