= Bloomsburg Huskies football =

- First season: 1892; 134 years ago
- Head coach: Frank Sheptock; 5th season, 19–35 (.352)
- Location: Bloomsburg, Pennsylvania
- Stadium: Robert B. Redman Stadium (capacity: 5,000)
- Field: Danny Hale Field
- NCAA division: Division II
- Conference: PSAC
- Colors: Maroon and gold

Conference championships
- 1948, 1949, 1952, 1954, 1955, 1985, 2013

Division championships
- 1984, 1985, 1994, 1995, 1996, 1997, 2000, 2001, 2002, 2003, 2005, 2006, 2010, 2013, 2014
- Website: bloomsburgathletics.com

The Bloomsburg Huskies football team represents Bloomsburg University in NCAA Division II college football. The Huskies began playing football in 1892, and compete as members of the Pennsylvania State Athletic Conference (PSAC).

== Conference history ==
- 1951–present: Pennsylvania State Athletic Conference

== Postseason appearances ==
=== NCAA Division II playoffs ===
The Huskies have made eleven appearances in the NCAA Division II playoffs, with a combined record of 9–11.

Year	Round	Opponent	Result
1985	Quarterfinals; Semifinals	Hampton; North Alabama	W, 38–28; L, 0–34
1996	First Round	Clarion	L, 29–42
2000	First Round; Quarterfinals; Semifinals; National Championship	Saginaw Valley State; Northwood; UC Davis; Delta State	W, 46–32; W, 38–14; W, 58–48; L, 34–63
2001	First Round	Grand Valley State	L, 14–42
2005	Second Round	East Stroudsburg	L, 39–52
2006	Second Round; Quarterfinals; Semifinals	West Chester; Shepherd; NW Missouri State	W, 21–20; W, 24–21; L, 3–33
2008	Second Round; Quarterfinals	West Chester; California (PA)	W, 28–21; L, 24–27
2010	First Round; Second Round	California (PA); Mercyhurst	W, 28–26; L, 14–28
2012	First Round	Shippensburg	L, 20–58
2013	Second Round	West Chester	L, 38–40
2014	Second Round	Virginia State; Concord	W, 35–14; L, 26–32
