= 2000 NCAA Division II football season =

American college football season

- Regular season: September 2 – November 11, 2000
- Playoffs: November 18 – December 9, 2000
- National Championship: Braly Municipal Stadium; Florence, AL
- Champion: Delta State
- Harlon Hill Trophy: Dusty Bonner, Valdosta State

The 2000 NCAA Division II football season, part of college football in the United States organized by the National Collegiate Athletic Association at the Division II level, began on September 2, 2000, and concluded with the NCAA Division II Football Championship on December 9, 2000 at Braly Municipal Stadium in Florence, Alabama, hosted by the University of North Alabama. The Delta State Statesmen defeated the Bloomsburg Huskies, 63–34, to win their first Division II national title.

The Harlon Hill Trophy was awarded to Dusty Bonner, quarterback from Valdosta State.

== Conferences and program changes ==
School	1999 Conference	2000 Conference
Gardner–Webb	South Atlantic	D-II Independent
Harding	Lone Star	Gulf South
Ouachita Baptist	Lone Star	Gulf South

== Conference standings ==
2000 Central Intercollegiate Athletic Association football standings
	Conf.			Overall
Team	W		L	W		L
Eastern
No. 10 Virginia Union xy	5	–	1	8	–	3
Virginia State	4	–	2	6	–	3
Bowie State	2	–	4	2	–	8
Elizabeth City State	1	–	6	1	–	9
Western
No. 8 Winston-Salem State xy$	5	–	1	9	–	2
North Carolina Central	3	–	3	4	–	6
Fayetteville State	2	–	4	3	–	7
Johnson C. Smith	2	–	4	3	–	7
Livingstone	1	–	5	2	–	8
Championship: Winston-Salem State 31, Virginia Union 28
$ – Conference champion; x – Division champion/co-champions; y – Championship game participant; Rankings from AFCA South Region poll

2000 Columbia Football Association standings
	Conf.			Overall
Team	W		L	W		L
No. 5 Western Washington +	3	–	1	7	–	3
Central Washington +	3	–	1	5	–	5
Western Oregon	2	–	2	6	–	5
Humboldt State	1	–	3	4	–	7
Simon Fraser *	1	–	3	2	–	8
+ – Conference co-champions; * – principally classified as NAIA member; Rankings from AFCA West Region poll

2000 Eastern Football Conference standings
	Conf.			Overall
Team	W		L	W		L
Atlantic Division
C. W. Post xy	7	–	1	8	–	2
Saint Anselm	5	–	3	6	–	4
Southern Connecticut	5	–	3	5	–	5
Merrimack	4	–	5	4	–	6
UMass Lowell	2	–	7	2	–	8
Central Division
American International xy$	8	–	1	9	–	3
Pace	4	–	4	4	–	6
Bentley	4	–	5	5	–	6
Assumption	3	–	5	5	–	6
Bryant	3	–	5	4	–	6
Stonehill	2	–	8	2	–	8
Championship: American International 20, C. W. Post 10
$ – Conference champion; x – Division champion/co-champions; y – Championship game participant

2000 Great Lakes Intercollegiate Athletic Conference football standings
	Conf.			Overall
Team	W		L	W		L
No. 2 Northwood +^	9	–	1	10	–	2
No. 4 Saginaw Valley State +^	9	–	1	9	–	3
Grand Valley State	7	–	3	7	–	4
Northern Michigan	6	–	4	6	–	5
Ashland	5	–	5	6	–	5
Michigan Tech	5	–	5	5	–	5
Ferris State	5	–	5	5	–	6
Wayne State (MI)	4	–	6	4	–	6
Mercyhurst	4	–	6	4	–	7
Hillsdale	2	–	8	3	–	8
Indianapolis	2	–	8	3	–	8
Findlay	2	–	8	2	–	8
+ – Conference co-champions; ^ – NCAA Division II playoff participant; Rankings from AFCA Northeast Region poll

2000 Gulf South Conference football standings
	Conf.			Overall
Team	W		L	W		L
No. 5 Delta State +^	8	–	1	14	–	1
No. 3 Valdosta State +^	8	–	1	10	–	2
No. 2 West Georgia +^	8	–	1	10	–	2
Arkansas Tech	7	–	2	7	–	3
No. 9 Arkansas–Monticello	6	–	3	8	–	3
Southern Arkansas	4	–	5	5	–	5
Harding	4	–	5	5	–	6
North Alabama	3	–	6	3	–	7
Central Arkansas	2	–	7	3	–	8
West Alabama	2	–	7	3	–	8
Ouachita Baptist	2	–	7	2	–	8
Henderson State	0	–	9	1	–	10
+ – Conference co-champions; ^ – NCAA Division II playoff participant; Rankings from AFCA South Region poll

2000 Lone Star Conference football standings
	Conf.			Overall
Team	W		L	W		L
Overall
No. 2 Northeastern State $^	7	–	1	9	–	1
Central Oklahoma	5	–	3	5	–	5
No. 7 Midwestern State	5	–	3	7	–	4
No. 10 Eastern New Mexico	5	–	3	6	–	4
East Central	5	–	3	6	–	5
Tarleton State	5	–	4	6	–	5
No. 8 SW Oklahoma State	4	–	4	6	–	4
West Texas A&M	4	–	4	5	–	6
Angelo State	4	–	4	6	–	4
Texas A&M–Commerce	4	–	5	5	–	6
Texas A&M–Kingsville	4	–	5	4	–	7
Abilene Christian	1	–	7	1	–	9
SE Oklahoma State	0	–	7	1	–	9
North
No. 2 Northeastern State x$^	5	–	0	9	–	1
No. 7 Midwestern State	3	–	2	7	–	4
Central Oklahoma	3	–	2	5	–	5
No. 8 SW Oklahoma State	2	–	3	6	–	4
East Central	2	–	3	6	–	5
SE Oklahoma State	0	–	5	1	–	9
South
No. 10 Eastern New Mexico x	4	–	2	6	–	4
Angelo State x	4	–	2	6	–	4
Tarleton State	3	–	3	6	–	5
West Texas A&M	3	–	3	5	–	6
Texas A&M–Commerce	3	–	3	5	–	6
Texas A&M–Kingsville	3	–	3	4	–	7
Abilene Christian	1	–	5	1	–	9
$ – Conference champion; ^ – NCAA Division II playoff participant; Rankings from AFCA West Region poll

2000 Mid-America Intercollegiate Athletics Association football standings
	Conf.			Overall
Team	W		L	W		L
No. 1 NW Missouri State $^	9	–	0	11	–	1
No. 7 Missouri Western State	8	–	1	8	–	4
No. 4 Pittsburg State ^	7	–	2	9	–	3
No. 10 Central Missouri State	5	–	4	7	–	4
Emporia State	5	–	4	6	–	5
Truman	5	–	4	6	–	5
Washburn	3	–	6	5	–	6
Missouri Southern State	2	–	7	2	–	9
Southwest Baptist	1	–	8	2	–	9
Missouri–Rolla	0	–	9	2	–	9
$ – Conference champion; ^ – NCAA Division II playoff participant; Rankings from AFCA Midwest Region poll

2000 North Central Conference football standings
	Conf.			Overall
Team	W		L	W		L
No. 2 Nebraska–Omaha $^	9	–	0	11	–	2
No. 3 North Dakota State ^	8	–	1	12	–	2
No. 5 North Dakota	6	–	3	8	–	3
No. 6 South Dakota	6	–	3	8	–	3
Augustana (SD)	5	–	4	7	–	4
South Dakota State	4	–	5	6	–	5
Northern Colorado	3	–	6	4	–	7
Minnesota State	3	–	6	3	–	8
St. Cloud State	1	–	8	1	–	9
Morningside	0	–	9	1	–	10
$ – Conference champion; ^ – NCAA Division II playoff participant; Rankings from AFCA Midwest Region poll

2000 Northern Sun Intercollegiate Conference football standings
	Conf.			Overall
Team	W		L	W		L
No. 8 Winona State $	7	–	1	9	–	3
No. 9 Bemidji State	6	–	2	9	–	2
Concordia–St. Paul	5	–	3	7	–	3
Minnesota Duluth	5	–	3	7	–	4
Minnesota–Crookston	5	–	3	6	–	4
Northern State	5	–	3	6	–	5
Southwest State (MN)	3	–	5	4	–	7
Minnesota State–Moorhead	2	–	6	3	–	8
Wayne State (NE)	1	–	7	2	–	8
Minnesota Morris	0	–	8	0	–	11
$ – Conference champion; Rankings from AFCA Midwest Region poll

2000 Pennsylvania State Athletic Conference football standings
	Conf.			Overall
Team	W		L	W		L
East Division
No. 3 Bloomsburg x^	6	–	0	12	–	3
No. 6 Millersville	5	–	1	6	–	4
No. 7 Kutztown	4	–	2	7	–	4
East Stroudsburg	3	–	3	6	–	5
West Chester	2	–	4	2	–	9
Mansfield	1	–	5	1	–	9
Cheyney	0	–	6	2	–	8
West Division
No. 5 IUP x^	5	–	1	8	–	3
No. 1 Slippery Rock x	5	–	1	8	–	3
Clarion x	5	–	1	7	–	4
Edinboro	2	–	4	5	–	6
Shippensburg	2	–	4	5	–	6
California (PA)	1	–	5	5	–	6
Lock Haven	1	–	5	3	–	8
x – Division champion/co-champions; ^ – NCAA Division II playoff participant; Rankings from AFCA Northeast Region poll

2000 Rocky Mountain Athletic Conference football standings
	Conf.			Overall
Team	W		L	W		L
No. 3 Mesa State $^	8	–	0	10	–	3
No. 4 Chadron State ^	7	–	1	8	–	3
No. 6 Nebraska–Kearney	6	–	2	7	–	3
No. 9 Western State (CO)	5	–	3	6	–	5
Fort Hays State	3	–	5	5	–	5
Adams State	3	–	5	3	–	7
Fort Lewis	2	–	6	3	–	8
New Mexico Highlands	1	–	7	3	–	8
Colorado Mines	1	–	7	2	–	8
$ – Conference champion; ^ – NCAA Division II playoff participant; Rankings from AFCA West Region poll

2000 South Atlantic Conference football standings
	Conf.			Overall
Team	W		L	W		L
No. 1 Catawba $^	7	–	0	11	–	1
No. 6 Presbyterian	6	–	1	8	–	2
No. 7 Carson–Newman	5	–	2	8	–	2
Tusculum	4	–	3	7	–	4
Mars Hill	3	–	4	5	–	5
Lenoir–Rhyne	2	–	5	4	–	7
Newberry	1	–	6	4	–	7
Wingate	0	–	7	1	–	10
$ – Conference champion; ^ – NCAA Division II playoff participant; Rankings from AFCA South Region poll

2000 Southern Intercollegiate Athletic Conference football standings
	Conf.			Overall
Team	W		L	W		L
No. 4 Tuskegee $	7	–	0	12	–	0
Morehouse	5	–	2	8	–	3
Fort Valley State	5	–	2	7	–	4
Albany State	3	–	4	4	–	6
Clark Atlanta	3	–	4	4	–	6
Miles	2	–	5	4	–	6
Lane	2	–	5	3	–	8
Kentucky State	1	–	6	4	–	7
$ – Conference champion; Rankings from AFCA South Region poll

2000 West Virginia Intercollegiate Athletic Conference football standings
	Conf.			Overall
Team	W		L	W		L
No. 9 West Liberty State +	6	–	1	8	–	2
No. 8 Fairmont State +	6	–	1	7	–	3
Shepherd	5	–	2	7	–	2
West Virginia Tech	3	–	4	5	–	6
West Virginia State	3	–	4	4	–	7
Glenville State	2	–	5	3	–	8
West Virginia Wesleyan	2	–	5	2	–	8
Concord	1	–	6	3	–	8
+ – Conference co-champions; Rankings from AFCA Northeast Region poll

2000 NCAA Division II independents football records
	Conf.			Overall
Team	W		L	W		L
No. 1 (West) UC Davis ^		–		12	–	1
No. 10 (Northeast) New Haven		–		5	–	5
Kentucky Wesleyan		–		4	–	6
Gannon		–		3	–	7
Saint Joseph's (IN)		–		2	–	8
Quincy		–		1	–	9
Western New Mexico		–		1	–	9
Oklahoma Panhandle State		–		1	–	10
^ – NCAA Division II playoff participant; Rankings from AFCA poll

== Conference summaries ==
Conference Champions

Central Intercollegiate Athletic Association – Winston-Salem State
Columbia Football Association – Central Washington and Western Washington
Eastern Collegiate Football Conference – American International
Great Lakes Intercollegiate Athletic Conference – Saginaw Valley State and Northwood
Gulf South Conference – Delta State, Valdosta State, and West Georgia
Lone Star Conference – Northeastern State
Mid-America Intercollegiate Athletics Association – Northwest Missouri State
North Central Conference – Nebraska–Omaha
Northern Sun Intercollegiate Conference – Winona State
Pennsylvania State Athletic Conference – Bloomsburg (East), Clarion, Indiana (PA), and Slippery Rock (West)
Rocky Mountain Athletic Conference – Colorado Mesa
South Atlantic Conference – Catawba
Southern Intercollegiate Athletic Conference – Tuskegee
West Virginia Intercollegiate Athletic Conference – Fairmont State and West Liberty

== Postseason ==
2000 NCAA Division II Football Championship
- Teams: 16
- Finals Site: Braly Municipal Stadium; Florence, AL
- Champion: Delta State; (1st title, title game)
- Runner-up: Bloomsburg; (1st title game)
- Semifinalists: North Dakota State; UC Davis
- Winning coach: championship

The 2000 NCAA Division II Football Championship playoffs were the 27th single-elimination tournament to determine the national champion of men's NCAA Division II college football. The championship game was held at Braly Municipal Stadium in Florence, Alabama for the 14th time.

=== Playoff bracket ===
First round Campus sites
North Dakota State	31
Northwest Missouri State	17
Nebraska–Omaha	14
Pittsburg State	13
Catawba	28
West Georgia	24
Delta State	49
Valdosta State	12
Northwood	28
IUP	0
Bloomsburg	46
Saginaw Valley State	32
UC Davis	48
Chadron State	10
Mesa State	40
Northeastern State	21

Quarterfinals; Campus sites
North Dakota State	43
Nebraska–Omaha	21
Catawba	14
Delta State	20
Northwood	14
Bloomsburg	38
UC Davis	62
Colorado Mesa	18

Semifinals; Campus sites
North Dakota State	16
Delta State	34
Bloomsburg	58
UC Davis	48

Championship; Braly Municipal Stadium; Florence, AL
Delta State	63
Bloomsburg	34

== See also ==
- 2000 NCAA Division I-A football season
- 2000 NCAA Division I-AA football season
- 2000 NCAA Division III football season
- 2000 NAIA football season
