= List of West Virginia State Yellow Jackets football seasons =

This is a list of seasons completed by the West Virginia State Yellow Jackets football team of the National Collegiate Athletic Association, Division II. Adolph Hamblin served as head coach from 1921 to 1944 and led the 1936 West Virginia State Yellow Jackets football team to a black college football national championship. They were previously members of the Central Intercollegiate Athletic Association (CIAA) and West Virginia Intercollegiate Athletic Conference WVIAC). They are currently members of the Mountain East Conference (MEC).

== Seasons ==
Legend

^{†} National champion
^{‡} Conference champion
^{#} Division champion
^ Bowl game berth
* Playoff berth

Season	Coach	Conference results				Season results			Bowl/playoff result	Final ranking	
Season	Coach	Finish	Wins	Losses	Ties	Wins	Losses	Ties	Bowl/playoff result	AP	Coaches'
West Virginia State Yellow Jackets football seasons
Central Intercollegiate Athletic Association (CIAA) (1942–1955)
1942	Adolph Hamblin/Mark Cardwell	10th/ of 11	2	2	0	6	2	0	—	—	N/A
1943	Adolph Hamblin/Mark Cardwell	6th/ of 6	0	2	0	0	2	0	—	—	N/A
1944	Adolph Hamblin/Mark Cardwell	8th/ of 8	0	2	1	1	4	1	—	—	N/A
1945	Adolph Hamblin/Mark Cardwell	2nd/ of 13	4	0	2	5	1	2	—	—	N/A
1946	Adolph Hamblin/Mark Cardwell	T–2nd/ of 16	5	2	0	6	3	1	—	—	N/A
1947	Adolph Hamblin/Mark Cardwell	6th/ of 15	4	1	1	6	3	1	—	—	N/A
1948^{‡}	Adolph Hamblin/Mark Cardwell	1st/ of 16	5	1	0	5	2	2	—	—	N/A
1949	Adolph Hamblin/Mark Cardwell	2nd/ of 16	5	0	1	8	0	1	—	—	N/A
1950	Adolph Hamblin/Mark Cardwell	4th/ of 16	3	2	1	5	3	1	—	—	—
1951^{‡}	Adolph Hamblin/Mark Cardwell	1st/ of 16	5	0	1	6	2	1	—	—	—
1952	Adolph Hamblin/Mark Cardwell	T–4th/ of 15	4	2	0	4	4	1	—	—	—
1953	Adolph Hamblin/Mark Cardwell	T–4th/ of 16	4	2	0	6	3	0	—	—	—
1954	Adolph Hamblin/Mark Cardwell	T–14th/ of 18	1	5	0	3	6	0	—	—	—
1955	Adolph Hamblin/Mark Cardwell	17th/ of 18	0	6	0	1	7	0	—	—	—
Total			42	27	7	62	42	11	CIAA overall record		
West Virginia Intercollegiate Athletic Conference (WVIAC) (1956–2012)
1956	Mark Cardwell	N/Q/ of 14	1	0	0	4	3	0	—	—	—
1957	Mark Cardwell	3rd/ of 13	2	1	1	2	4	2	—	—	—
1958	Mark Cardwell	5th/ of 13	2	1	1	3	4	1	—	—	—
1959	Unknown	8th/ of 13	2	2	0	2	4	1	—	—	—
1960	Chester Burris	11th/ of 13	0	4	0	1	6	0	—	—	—
1961	Chester Burris	10th/ of 13	0	4	0	0	7	0	—	—	—
1962	Chester Burris	??th/ of 12	0	?	0	0	7	0	—	—	—
1963	Paul Talbott	6th/ of 11	3	3	0	4	4	0	—	—	—
1964	Paul Talbott	10th/ of 11	1	4	1	2	5	1	—	—	—
1965	Paul Talbott	9th/ of 10	1	4	1	1	6	1	—	—	—
1966	Richard Tredway	9th/ of 10	1	6	0	2	7	0	—	—	—
1967	Richard Tredway	8th/ of 10	1	5	0	2	6	0	—	—	—
1968^{‡}	Colin Cameron	1st/ of 10	5	1	0	8	1	0	—	—	—
1969	Colin Cameron	4th/ of 10	4	3	0	6	4	0	—	—	—
1970	Colin Cameron	4th/ of 10	4	3	0	4	5	0	—	—	—
1971	Colin Cameron	7th/ of 10	2	5	0	2	8	0	—	—	—
1972	Colin Cameron	6th/ of 10	4	3	0	4	6	0	—	—	—
1973	Colin Cameron	3rd (Southern) of 5	2	2	0	5	5	0	—	—	—
1974	Colin Cameron	5th (Southern) of 5	0	4	0	1	8	0	—	—	—
1975	Colin Cameron	T–2nd (Southern) of 5	2	2	0	3	6	1	—	—	—
1976	Colin Cameron	T–2nd (Southern) of 5	2	2	0	4	4	1	—	—	—
1977	Oree Banks	3rd (Southern) of 5	2	2	0	2	8	0	—	—	—
1978	Oree Banks	T–2nd (Southern) of 5	6	3	0	6	4	0	—	—	—
1979^{#}	Oree Banks	1st (Southern) of 5	6	3	0	6	5	0	—	—	—
1980	Oree Banks	2nd (Southern) of 5	6	3	0	6	4	0	—	—	—
1981	Oree Banks	T–6th/ of 9	2	5	1	3	5	1	—	—	—
1982	Oree Banks	4th/ of 9	5	3	0	6	3	1	—	—	—
1983	Oree Banks	T–7th/ of 9	2	6	0	3	7	0	—	—	—
1984	Clifton Moore	6th/ of 9	3	4	1	4	5	1	—	—	—
1985	Clifton Moore	8th/ of 8	0	7	0	2	8	0	—	—	—
1986	Clifton Moore	T–5th/ of 8	2	5	0	3	7	0	—	—	—
1987	Clifton Moore	8th/ of 8	0	7	0	0	11	0	—	—	—
1988	Clifton Moore	4th/ of 8	3	3	1	4	5	1	—	—	—
1989	Clifton Moore	T–3rd/ of 7	3	3	0	3	7	0	—	—	—
1990	Bob Gobel	4th/ of 7	3	3	0	4	6	0	—	—	—
1991	Bob Gobel	3rd/ of 8	4	3	0	6	4	0	—	—	—
1992	Scott Tinsley	4th/ of 8	4	3	0	6	4	0	—	—	—
1993	Scott Tinsley	7th/ of 8	1	6	0	1	9	0	—	—	—
1994	Scott Tinsley	8th/ of 8	2	5	0	4	6	0	—	—	—
1995	Eric Gates	7th/ of 8	1	6	0	1	9	0	—	—	—
1996	Carl Lee	4th/ of 8	3	4	0	4	7	0	—	—	—
1997	Carl Lee	T–4th/ of 8	3	4	0	5	6	0	—	—	—
1998	Carl Lee	7th/ of 8	2	5	0	3	8	0	—	—	—
1999	Carl Lee	T–4th/ of 7	2	4	0	5	5	0	—	—	—
2000	Carl Lee	T–4th/ of 8	3	4	0	4	7	0	—	—	—
2001	Carl Lee	7th/ of 8	2	5	0	4	7	0	—	—	—
2002	Carl Lee	8th/ of 8	0	7	0	1	10	0	—	—	—
2003	Carl Lee	T–4th/ of 8	3	4	0	3	8	0	—	—	—
2004	Carl Lee	T–6th/ of 8	2	5	0	3	8	0	—	—	—
2005	Carl Lee	T–7th/ of 9	2	6	0	2	9	0	—	—	—
2006	Earl Monroe	7th/ of 8	2	5	0	5	6	0	—	—	—
2007	Earl Monroe	T–4th/ of 9	5	3	0	7	3	0	—	—	—
2008	Earl Monroe	T–4th/ of 9	5	3	0	7	3	0	—	—	—
2009	Earl Monroe	T–7th/ of 9	2	6	0	3	7	0	—	—	—
2010	Earl Monroe	9th/ of 9	0	8	0	0	10	0	—	—	—
2011	Earl Monroe	T–7th/ of 9	1	7	0	1	9	0	—	—	—
2012	Earl Monroe	8th/ of 9	1	7	0	2	9	0	—	—	—
Total			132	226	7	189	349	12	WVIAC overall record		
Mountain East Conference (MEC) (2013–present)
2013	Jon Anderson	11th/ of 11<	0	10	0	0	11	0	—	—	—
2014	Jon Anderson	11th/ of 11	1	9	0	2	9	0	—	—	—
2015	Jon Anderson	8th/ of 11	5	5	0	5	6	0	—	—	—
2016	Jon Anderson	9th/ of 11	3	7	0	3	8	0	—	—	—
2017	John Pennington	T–4th/ of 11	5	5	0	6	5	0	—	—	—
2018	John Pennington	T–5th/ of 11	5	5	0	6	5	0	—	—	—
2019	John Pennington	T–2nd/ of 11	7	3	0	7	4	0	—	—	—
2020	John Pennington	4th/ of 6 (South)	2	2	0	2	2	0	—	—	—
2021	John Pennington	T–4th/ of 12	6	4	0	6	5	0	—	—	—
2022	John Pennington	T–4th/ of 12	6	4	0	7	4	0	—	—	—
2023	John Pennington	T–7th/ of 11	4	5	0	4	6	0	—	—	—
2024	John Pennington	T–5th/ of 11	5	4	0	6	5	0	—	—	—
2025	John Pennington	5th/ of 11	4	4	0	5	6	0	—	—	—
Total			53	67	0	59	76	0	MEC overall record		
Total			227	320	14	310	467	23	Regular season games		
Total			0	0	0	0	0	0	Playoff games; 0 appearances		
Total			227	320	14	376	517	40	all games		
♦ Denotes a tie for first place and conference co-champion
