= Charles Fremont West =

American physician

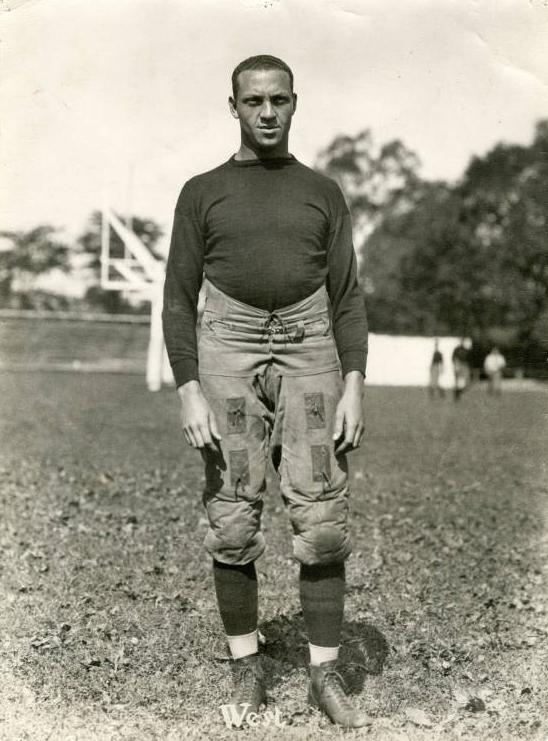

Biographical details
- Born: January 25, 1899; Washington, Pennsylvania, U.S.
- Died: November 20, 1979 (aged 80); Washington, D.C., U.S.

Playing career

Football
- 1920–1923: Washington & Jefferson
- Position: Quarterback

Coaching career (HC unless noted)

Football
- 1925: Howard (assistant)
- 1928: Howard
- 1934–1935: Howard

Head coaching record
- Overall: 11–12–1

Accomplishments and honors

Awards
- Pennsylvania Sports Hall of Fame (1979)

Charles Fremont "Pruner" West (January 25, 1899 – November 20, 1979) was an American track athlete, college football player and coach, and physician. He played football and ran track at Washington & Jefferson College in Washington, Pennsylvania. He was the first African American to play quarterback in a Rose Bowl. West served as the head football coach at Howard University in Washington, D.C. in 1928 and again from 1934 to 1935, compiling a record of 11–12–1.

== Personal ==
West was born in 1899 to William B. and Hannah Thomas from Washington County, Pennsylvania. He was the third of four children. The family moved from their farm in Burgettstown to Washington, Pennsylvania in 1911. West's father opened a drug store that later was turned into a grocery store and was elected to Washington City Council. West's nickname, Pruner, came from a mispronunciation of "Peruna" a cough syrup sold by his father. Charles was an outstanding athlete at Washington High School and was scouted by Pittsburgh Pirates. Rumors circulated that he had outraced a horse and wrestled the family bull to the ground.

== Career at Washington & Jefferson ==
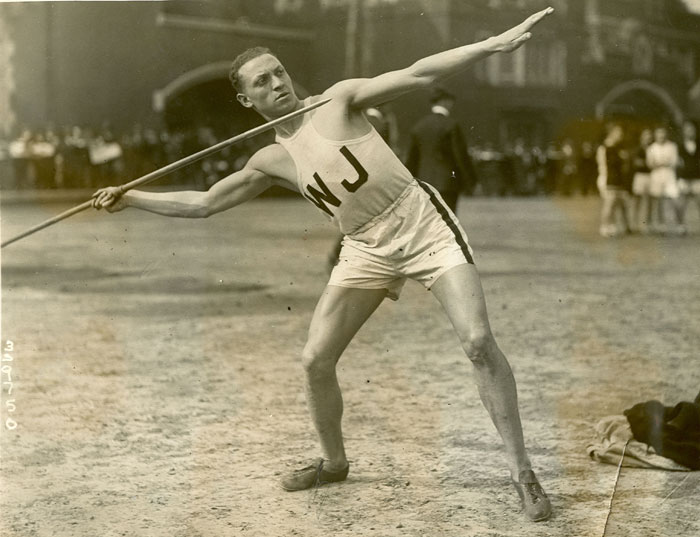
West throwing javelin

In 1920, he entered Washington & Jefferson College, where he played football and threw javelin for the track and field team. He was captain of track team in 1924. At the time, he was one of a few African-American players in private colleges.

He was the halfback and the backup quarterback for the 1921 Washington & Jefferson Presidents football team, but took over the starting quarterback job after the game against Pittsburgh, a position he held the rest of the season. That January, he became the first African American quarterback to play in the Rose Bowl and led his team to a hard-fought, scoreless tie against the California Golden Bears.

On November 24, 1921, W&J arrived via train in Wheeling, West Virginia to play the West Virginia Mountaineers amid chants of "Kill the nigger," in reference to West. The crowd was unable to tell which W&J player was him, as Pruner was a relatively light-skinned African American. West was the last member of the team off the train and told the confused crowd, "We didn't bring him with us this time." Following the 13–0 victory, Pruner visited a Wheeling drug store that displayed a sambo-type doll with the tag "West" in an ambulance. West introduced himself to the drug store owner and asked for the display "after [he] was done with it." The embarrassed store owner gave it to him on the spot.

In a similar incident, Washington and Lee traveled to Washington for a game, but refused to play against West, as it was against their "tradition." Robert M. Murphy sent the Washington and Lee team, who knew that West was on the roster when they scheduled the game, a message saying, "W&J does not play without Pruner West." Washington & Lee balked and went home with their "guarantee" and a 1–0 forfeit loss amid catcalls and a "near riot" at the train station. It became known later that Murphy knew that West had a sprained ankle and would not have been able to play anyway, but he refused to honor W&L's request.

Pruner missed the first half of the November 4, 1922 game against Lafayette at the Polo Grounds with his arm taped to his side. He returned for the second half to spark a 14-point comeback to win, 14–13. Walter Camp named him as an All-American honorable mention in 1923.

== Coaching and medical career ==
West signed with the Akron Pros of the National Football League (NFL), but quit to attend medical school at Howard University in Washington, D.C., where he also coached football. He was an assistant coach under head coach Louis L. Watson in 1925. West succeeded Watson as head coach in 1928. West was in turn succeeded by Tom Verdell in 1929, but returned as head coach in 1934 and 1935. He practiced medicine in Alexandria, Virginia for many years.

West and his wife, Laverne, had two children: Linda West Nickens and Nathaniel West. He was an excellent skeet and trap shooter and loved hunting and fishing. In 1978, West was awarded the Distinguished Alumni Service Award from W&J. He died in 1979.

== Legacy ==
West was inducted into the Pennsylvania Sports Hall of Fame on May 6, 1979.

In 2011, his role in the advancement of African Americans in collegiate sports was recognized in a joint W&J/West Virginia University ceremony at the U. Grant Miller Library. A large photo of West's throwing a javelin is displayed at the W&J Hall of Fame at Cameron Stadium.

At the 2017 Rose Bowl Game, West was inducted into the Rose Bowl Hall of Fame.

== Head coaching record ==
Year	Team	Overall	Conference	Standing	Bowl/playoffs
Howard Bison (Independent) (1928)
1928	Howard	6–1–2			
Howard Bison (Colored Intercollegiate Athletic Association) (1934–1935)
1934	Howard	2–6 (Note: Howard finished the 1934 season 4–2–2 overall and 3–1–2 in conference play, placing fifth in the Colored Intercollegiate Athletic Association (CIAA) standings, which were determined by the Dickinson System. In December 1934, Howard forfeited conference wins over Hampton and Saint Paul and conference ties with Morgan and Virginia State due to an ineligible player.)	1–5	10th	
1935	Howard	3–5	1–5	10th	
Howard:		11–12–2	2–10		
Total:		11–12–2			
