= 1927 Bluefield Big Blue football team =

American college football season

1927 Bluefield Big Blue football

Black college national co-champion MAA champion
- Conference: Midwest Athletic Association
- Record: 8–0–1 ( MWAA)
- Head coach: Harry R. Jefferson (3rd season)
- Home stadium: Beceye Bowl

The 1928 Bluefield Big Blue football team was an American football team that represented the Bluefield Institute (now known as Bluefield State College) during the 1927 college football season. In its third season under head coach Harry R. Jefferson, the team compiled an 8–0–1 record. Bluefield became known as the "Wonder Team" and was recognized as the 1928 black college national champion. The team played its home games in the Beceye Bowl in Bluefield, West Virginia.

Quarterback Herbert Cain was selected as captain of the 1927 colored All-America team. Jimmie Moore was the team's line coach.

== Schedule ==
Date	Time	Opponent	Site	Result	Attendance	Source
September 24		Knoxville	Bluefield, WV	W 38–0		
October 1		at Howard	Washington, DC	W 18–7		
October 8		Wilberforce	Bluefield, WV	T 0–0		
October 14		at North Carolina A&T	Fair Grounds; Winston-Salem, NC	W 27–7	5,000	
October 29		at Morristown	Morristown, TN	W 93–0		
November 12	3:00 p.m.	at West Virginia Collegiate	Lakin Field; Institute, WV	W 18–6	5,000	
November 22		Storer	Bluefield, WV	W 49–0		
November 26	3:00 p.m.	vs. Virginia Seminary	Maher Field; Roanoke, VA	W 14–13		
All times are in Eastern time
