= Harry R. Jefferson =

American sports coach and administrator (1899–1966)

Biographical details
- Born: May 12, 1899; Parkersburg, West Virginia, U.S.
- Died: April 24, 1966 (aged 66); Philadelphia, Pennsylvania, U.S.

Playing career

Football
- 1917: West Virginia State
- 1918–1921: Ohio
- Positions: Guard, center

Coaching career (HC unless noted)

Football
- 1922: Kelly Miller HS (WV)
- 1923: Wilberforce
- 1924: Kelly Miller HS (WV)
- 1925–1929: Bluefield (WV)
- 1930–1931: North Carolina A&T
- 1932–1933: Bluefield State
- 1934–1948: Virginia State
- 1949–1956: Hampton

Basketball
- 1924: Kelly Miller HS (WV)
- 1934–1949: Virginia State

Baseball
- 1924: Wilberforce

Administrative career (AD unless noted)
- 1924–1925: Kelly Miller HS (WV)
- 1925–1930: Bluefield (WV)
- 1930–1932: North Carolina A&T
- 1932–1934: Bluefield State
- 1949–1957: Hampton
- 1961–1965: CIAA (commissioner)

Head coaching record
- Overall: 171–91–24 (college football)
- Bowls: 2–1

Accomplishments and honors

Championships
- 3 black college national (1927, 1928, 1936); 2 MAA (1927–1928); 4 CIAA (1936, 1938, 1939, 1945)

Awards
- All-Ohio center (1921); NAIA Hall of Fame (1961); Virginia State University Hall of Fame (1980); CIAA Hall of Fame (1982); Bluefield State Hall of Fame (teams) (2008); AFCA Trailblazer Award (2010)

Harry Rupert "Big Jeff" Jefferson (May 12, 1899 – April 24, 1966) was an American football, basketball, and baseball coach and college athletics administrator. He served as the head football coach at Wilberforce University (1923), Bluefield State College (1925–1929, 1932–1933), North Carolina Agricultural and Technical State University (1930–1931), Virginia State University (1934–1948), Hampton University (1949–1959), compiling a career college football coaching record of 169–92–25. Jefferson led his teams to black college football national championships in 1927, 1928, and 1936. Jefferson was the first chairman and charter member of the National Athletic Steering Committee (NASC) in 1951. Later, Jefferson served as president of the NASC in 1957 and was honorary president in 1959. Jefferson was also honored by the NASC in 1958 for 35 years "contributed to the development of youth through athletic coaching and administration." Jefferson was also the first commissioner of the Central Intercollegiate Athletic Association (CIAA) in 1961. In college, he was a founding member of the Phi chapter of Alpha Phi Alpha at Ohio University.

Jefferson died of a heart attack, on April 24, 1966, at Mercy Douglas Hospital in Philadelphia. His funeral was held at Arlington National Cemetery.

== Head coaching record ==
=== College football ===
Year	Team	Overall	Conference	Standing	Bowl/playoffs
Wilberforce Green Wave (Independent) (1923)
1923	Wilberforce	3–2			
Wilberforce:		3–2			
Bluefield Big Blue (Independent) (1925)
1925	Bluefield	2–2–1			
Bluefield Big Blue (Midwest Athletic Association) (1926–1929)
1926	Bluefield	3–2			
1927	Bluefield	8–0–1		1st	
1928	Bluefield	8–0–1		1st	
1929	Bluefield	6–2–1			
North Carolina A&T Aggies (Colored Intercollegiate Athletic Association) (1930–1931)
1930	North Carolina A&T	3–6–1	3–5–1	7th	
1931	North Carolina A&T	3–5	3–5	7th	
North Carolina A&T:		6–11–1	6–10–1		
Bluefield State Big Blues (Colored Intercollegiate Athletic Association) (1932–1933)
1932	Bluefield State	4–4–1	3–2	5th	
1933	Bluefield State	6–2–2	4–1–2	3rd	
Bluefield / Bluefield State:		37–12–7	7–3–2		
Virginia State Trojans (Colored Intercollegiate Athletic Association) (1934–1948)
1934	Virginia State	4–4–1 (Note: Virginia State finished the 1934 season 3–4–2 overall and 3–3–2 in conference play, tying for sixth place in the Colored Intercollegiate Athletic Association (CIAA) standings, which were determined by the Dickinson System. In December 1934, Howard forfeited a conference tie to Virginia State.)	4–3–1	5th	L Orange Blossom Classic
1935	Virginia State	6–3–1	5–3	4th	
1936	Virginia State	7–0–2	6–0–2	1st	
1937	Virginia State	8–1	7–1	2nd	
1938	Virginia State	7–0–1	6–0–1	1st	
1939	Virginia State	7–1–1	7–0–1	1st	
1940	Virginia State	3–3–2	2–3–2	T–8th	
1941	Virginia State	5–2–1	4–2–1	3rd	
1942	Virginia State	7–2–1	5–2–1	3rd	
1943	Virginia State	4–2	2–2	3rd	
1944	Virginia State	7–1–1	4–1–1	2nd	W Orange Blossom Classic
1945	Virginia State	8–0–2	6–0–1	1st	W Piedmont Tobacco
1946	Virginia State	7–2	5–2	3rd	
1947	Virginia State	8–1	7–1	2nd	
1948	Virginia State	5–3	5–3	6th	
Virginia State:		93–25–13	75–23–11		
Hampton Pirates (Colored Intercollegiate Athletic Association / Central Intercollegiate Athletic Association) (1949–1956)
1949	Hampton	5–4	3–4	9th	
1950	Hampton	2–7	2–5	13th	
1951	Hampton	5–4	4–4	7th	
1952	Hampton	4–5	4–4	8th	
1953	Hampton	6–3–1	5–3	6th	
1954	Hampton	4–5–1	4–5–1	9th	
1955	Hampton	4–6	4–6	11th	
1956	Hampton	2–7–1	2–7–1	12th	
Hampton:		32–41–3	28–38–2		
Total:		171–91–24			
National championship Conference title Conference division title or championship game berth
