= 1928 Bluefield Big Blue football team =

American college football season

1928 Bluefield Big Blue football

Black college national co-champion MAA champion

Mid-Western Football Classic, W 40–0 vs. Morehouse
- Conference: Midwest Athletic Association
- Record: 8–0–1 ( MWAA)
- Head coach: Harry R. Jefferson (4th season)
- Home stadium: Beceye Bowl

The 1928 Bluefield Big Blue football team was an American football team that represented the Bluefield Institute (now known as Bluefield State College) during the 1928 college football season.

In its fourth season under head coach Harry R. Jefferson, the team compiled an 8–0–1 record. Bluefield was the defending 1927 black college national champion, became known as the "Wonder Team", and was again recognized as the 1928 black college national champion. The team played its home games in the Beceye Bowl in Bluefield, West Virginia.

Key players included tackle Ted Gallion and quarterback Herbert Cain. Jimmy Moore was the assistant coach.

== Schedule ==
Date	Opponent	Site	Result	Attendance	Source
September 29	Virginia Union	Bluefield, WV	W 31–7		
October 6	at Wilberforce	Wilberforce, Oh	W 2–0		
October 13	at North Carolina A&T	Winston-Salem, NC	W		
October 27	at Morgan	Baltimore, MD	W 25–6		
November 3	Howard	Beceye Bowl; Bluefield, WV	T 0–0	2,000	
November 10	West Virginia Collegiate	Beceye Bowl; Bluefield, WV	W 13–0		
November 17	Morristown	Bluefield, WV	W 129–0		
November 24	vs. Virginia Seminary	Maher Field; Roanoke, VA	W 13–6	1,000	
November 29	vs. Morehouse	Neil Park; Columbus, OH (Mid-Western Football Classic)	W 40–0	7,000	
