= Hancock House (Bluefield, West Virginia) =

Historic house in West Virginia, United States

- U.S. National Register of Historic Places
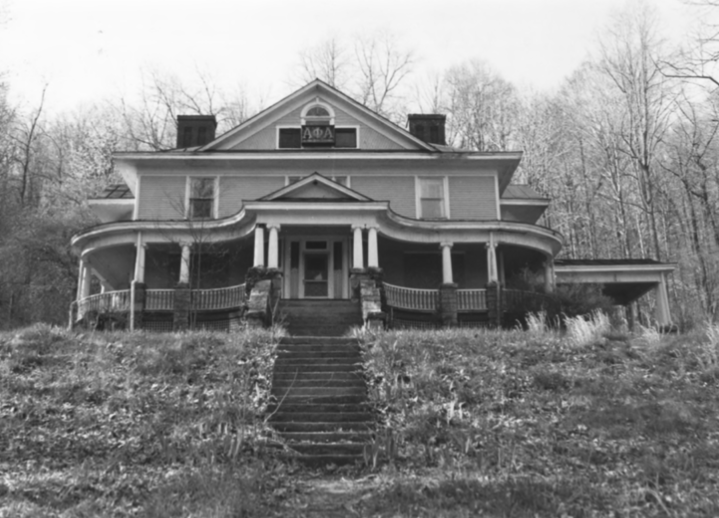

- Location within West Virginia Location within the United States
- Location: 300 Sussex Street, Bluefield, West Virginia
- Coordinates: 37°16′33″N 81°13′13″W
- Built: 1907
- Architect: M. H. Pettigo
- Architectural style: American Foursquare
- NRHP reference No.: 89001783
- Added to NRHP: January 17, 1990

The Hancock House, also known as the Alpha House, is an American historic home located at 300 Sussex Street in Bluefield, West Virginia. The house was built in 1907 and became the chapter house of Alpha Phi Alpha fraternity from 1962 to 2000. It was listed on the National Register of Historic Places in 1990.

== History ==
=== Private residence ===
Hancock House is a mansion in Bluefield, West Virginia that was built in 1907 on a site for Ora and Charles Benjamin Hancock and their ten children. Hancock was self-educated man who became a millionaire through the Bluefield Hardware Co., a wholesaler for mining and hardware supplies. Later, he was an investor in the Kingsport Hardware in Kingsport, Tennessee. He also a stockbroker for 25 years, dabbled in the coal industry, and established the Bluefield Furniture Co. Bluefield Furniture Co. became on 25 acres (10 ha) of the largest wholesale furniture business in the Southern United States. In 2015, both Bluefield Furniture Co. and Bluefield Hardware Co. were still in business.

After Charles Hancock died in the early 1940s, Ora sold the house to the Del Ramage. Once fashionable and historically white, by the early 1960s, Hancock House's neighborhood transitioned into a mostly Black neighborhood as coal mining and the railroad grew in the area. The Ramage family sold the house to Alpha Phi Alpha of Bluefield State College, an historical black university, in 1962.

=== Fraternity house ===
Alpha Phi Alpha is a historically Black college and community-based social fraternity, founded at Cornell University in Ithaca, New York, on December 4, 1906. It established its Alpha Zeta Lambda chapter for individuals associated with Bluefield Colored Institute and Browns Creek District High School on January 28, 1927. A second chapter, Beta Theta, was chartered for undergraduate students at Bluefield Colored Institute on March 5, 1932, becoming the first national fraternity on what would become Bluefield State University. At the time Alpha Zeta Lambda became a graduate chapter, which included Henry Lake Dickason and Duke Ellington, amongst its members.

Alpha Zeta Lambda chapter organized a Housing Foundation and purchased the Hancock House from the Ramage family in 1962. Thus, it became the largest house owned by African Americans in the region.

Alpha Zeta Lambda chapter dedicated its renamed Alpha House on September 29, 1963, with a gala that was attended by hundreds of from the area and across the United States. The fraternity turned Alpha House into a fraternity chapter house and social and cultural center during the era of segregation. The main level was used for community meetings, parties, and balls, while its upstairs provided housing for undergraduate fraternity members. Duke Ellington performed in Alpha House on December 12, 1966.

The fraternity continued to occupy Alpha House until around 2000, when the property was sold due to declining membership, significant disrepair, and high insurance costs. The charter of Alpha Zeta Lambda chapter was moved to Morgantown, West Virginia on September 21, 2016, ending its more than eighty years in Bluefield. Beta Theta chapter is also inactive.

Alpha House was listed on the National Register of Historic Places on January 17, 1990, as the Hancock House. Its address is 300 Sussex Street in Bluefield, West Virginia.

== Architecture ==
Hancock House was designed and built by M. H. Pettigo on a hill overlooking downtown Bluefield and the Norfolk and Western Railway yard. It is a large, two-and-a-half-story frame dwelling in the American Foursquare style. It is one of the most significant examples of this style in Bluefield.

Hancock House has a frame structure, a stone foundation, a hipped roof, and a front-facing triangular gable with a Palladian window. It features a massive, very deep porch encircling the house on the front and side elevations and a porte cochere. The porch has Colonial Revival details, including Ionic columns with stone pedestals and a wooden balustrade. The house's tall, interior red brick chimney stacks are also built in the Colonial Revival style.

Hancock House was constructed with fourteen rooms, including eight bedrooms and eight fireplaces. Today, the first floor has an entrance hall, great room, dining room, study, and kitchen. Upstairs, there are six bedrooms. The finishes include oak flooring, imported European plaster, and walnut doors, also imported from Europe. Each fireplace is decorated with different tiles that were imported from Italy and walnut mantles imported from Europe. Its entrance is flanked by leaded stained glass windows. The ten-foot sliding and paneled wooden doors divide the formal living room from both the entrance hall and a secondary parlor.

The house also has a brick-walled basement. The yard is terraced and has concrete steps leading up the from the street to the house.

== See also ==
- North American fraternity and sorority housing
