= 1930 Florida A&M Rattlers football team =

American college football season

1930 Florida A&M Rattlers football
- Conference: Southern Intercollegiate Athletic Conference
- Record: 2–4 (0–3 SIAC)
- Head coach: Jubie Bragg (10th season)

1930 Southern Intercollegiate Athletic Conference football standings
	Conf.					Overall
Team	W		L		T	W		L		T
Tuskegee $	7	–	0	–	0	10	–	0	–	1
Fisk	2	–	0	–	0	10	–	1	–	0
Morehouse	6	–	1	–	0	9	–	2	–	0
Morris Brown	4	–	2	–	1	6	–	3	–	1
Edward Waters	2	–	1	–	0	7	–	1	–	1
Alabama State	3	–	3	–	0	6	–	5	–	0
Knoxville	1	–	2	–	0	?	–	?	–	?
Talladega	1	–	4	–	0	1	–	6	–	0
Clark (GA)	0	–	3	–	1	?	–	?	–	?
Florida A&M	0	–	3	–	0	2	–	4	–	0
Lane	0	–	3	–	0	?	–	?	–	?
Miles	0	–	4	–	0	2	–	5	–	0
$ – Conference champion

The 1930 Florida A&M Rattlers football team represented represented Florida Agricultural and Mechanical College for Negroes (FAMC)—now known as Florida A&M University—as a member of the Southern Intercollegiate Athletic Conference (SIAC) during the 1930 college football season. Led by Jubie Bragg in his tenth and final season as head coach, the Rattlers compiled an overall record of 2–4 with a mark of 0–3 in conference play.

W. McKinley King served as an assistant coach.

== Schedule ==
Date	Time	Opponent	Site	Result	Attendance	Source
October 3		Alabama State	Tallahassee, FL	L 7–13		
October 18		Morris Brown	Tallahassee, FL	L 6–21		
November 7	3:30 p.m.	at Bethune–Cookman*	College park; Daytona Beach, FL	W 32–0		
November 22		South Carolina State*	Tallahassee, FL	W 6–0		
November 27		at Florida Normal*	St. Augustine, FL	L 6–20		
December 13	3:00 p.m.	at Edward Waters	Durkee Field; Jacksonville, FL	L 0–20	3,000	
*Non-conference game; All times are in Eastern time
