= 1945 Delaware State Hornets football team =

American college football season

1945 Delaware State Hornets football
- Conference: Colored Intercollegiate Athletic Association
- Record: 4–3 (3–3 CIAA)
- Head coach: Tom Conrad (2nd season)

1945 Colored Intercollegiate Athletic Association football standings
	Conf.					Overall
Team	W		L		T	W		L		T
Virginia State $	6	–	0	–	1	8	–	0	–	2
West Virginia State	4	–	0	–	2	5	–	1	–	2
North Carolina College	5	–	1	–	0	6	–	3	–	0
Johnson C. Smith	3	–	3	–	1	5	–	4	–	1
Morgan State	5	–	2	–	0	5	–	2	–	0
Howard	4	–	3	–	0	4	–	4	–	0
Virginia Union	4	–	3	–	0	4	–	4	–	0
Delaware State	3	–	3	–	0	4	–	3	–	0
Lincoln (PA)	2	–	4	–	0	2	–	5	–	0
North Carolina A&T	2	–	5	–	0	2	–	5	–	0
Hampton	2	–	6	–	0	2	–	6	–	0
Bluefield State	1	–	5	–	0	1	–	6	–	0
Shaw	0	–	6	–	0	0	–	6	–	0
$ – Conference champion; Conference standings were based on the Dickinson System.

The 1945 Delaware State Hornets football team represented the State College for Colored Students—now known as Delaware State University—as a member of Colored Intercollegiate Athletic Association (CIAA) during the 1945 college football season. Led by second-year head coach Tom Conrad, the Hornets compiled an overall record of 4–3 with a mark of 3–3 in conference play, placing eighth in the CIAA standings, which were determined by the Dickinson System.

== Schedule ==
Date	Opponent	Site	Result	Source
September 29	at North Carolina Central	Durham, NC	W 13–12	
October 6	at Morgan State	Baltimore, MD	L 0–27	
October 13	Lincoln (PA)	Dover, DE	L 13–25	
October 27	at Hampton	Armstrong Stadium; Hampton, VA	W 14–0	
November 3	at Howard	Washington, DC	L 19–25	
November 17	at Winston-Salem*	Winston-Salem, NC	W ?	
November 22	Bluefield State	Dover, DE	W 26–0	
*Non-conference game
