= 1945 West Virginia State Yellow Jackets football team =

American college football season

1945 West Virginia State Yellow Jackets football
- Conference: Colored Intercollegiate Athletic Association
- Record: 5–1–2 (4–0–2 CIAA)
- Head coach: Mark Cardwell (1st season)
- Home stadium: Lakin Field

1945 Colored Intercollegiate Athletic Association football standings
	Conf.					Overall
Team	W		L		T	W		L		T
Virginia State $	6	–	0	–	1	8	–	0	–	2
West Virginia State	4	–	0	–	2	5	–	1	–	2
North Carolina College	5	–	1	–	0	6	–	3	–	0
Johnson C. Smith	3	–	3	–	1	5	–	4	–	1
Morgan State	5	–	2	–	0	5	–	2	–	0
Howard	4	–	3	–	0	4	–	4	–	0
Virginia Union	4	–	3	–	0	4	–	4	–	0
Delaware State	3	–	3	–	0	4	–	3	–	0
Lincoln (PA)	2	–	4	–	0	2	–	5	–	0
North Carolina A&T	2	–	5	–	0	2	–	5	–	0
Hampton	2	–	6	–	0	2	–	6	–	0
Bluefield State	1	–	5	–	0	1	–	6	–	0
Shaw	0	–	6	–	0	0	–	6	–	0
$ – Conference champion; Conference standings were based on the Dickinson System.

The 1945 West Virginia State Yellow Jackets football team was an American football team that represented West Virginia State College—now known as West Virginia State University—as a member of the Colored Intercollegiate Athletic Association (CIAA) during the 1945 college football season. In their first season under head coach Mark Cardwell, the Yellow Jackets compiled an overall record of 5–1–2 with a mark of 4–0–2 in conference play, placing second in the CIAA standings, which were determined by the Dickinson System. The team played home games in Charleston, West Virginia, and at Lakin Field in Institute, West Virginia.

== Schedule ==
Date	Opponent	Site	Result	Attendance	Source
October 6	Howard	Charleston, WV	W 6–0		
October 13	Morgan State	Charleston, WV	W 20–0		
October 20	at Johnson C. Smith	Charlotte, NC	T 6–6		
October 27	at North Carolina A&T	Greensboro, NC	W 20–0		
November 3	at Virginia State	Petersburg, VA	T 6–6	6,500	
November 10	Winston-Salem State*	Institute, WV	W 35–0		
November 17	Bluefield State	Institute, WV	W 43–0		
November 22	at Wilberforce*	Wilberforce, OH	L 6–20		
*Non-conference game
