= Tom Verdell =

American football player and coach (1905–1987)

Biographical details
- Born: May 8, 1905; Alabama, U.S.
- Died: January 4, 1987 (aged 81)

Playing career

Football
- 1926–1928: Northwestern
- Position: End

Coaching career (HC unless noted)

Football
- 1929–1933: Howard
- 1934–?: Virginia State

Administrative career (AD unless noted)
- 1963–?: Virginia State (acting AD)

Head coaching record
- Overall: 13–24–3 (football)
- Bowls: 0–1

Thomas Verdell (May 8, 1905 – January 4, 1987) was an American college football player and coach. He served as the head football coach at Howard University in Washington, D.C. from 1929 to 1933, compiling a record of 13–24–3.

Verdell was born in Alabama and grew up in Chicago. He attended Northwestern University, where he played football as an end from 1926 to 1928. Following his graduating in 1929, he was appointed head coach in football and track at Howard. After five years at Howard, Verdell moved on to Virginia State University in 1934 to work as assistant football coach under Harry R. Jefferson and later assisted Sylvester Hall. Verdell spent 39 years at Virginia State, during which time was also head coach in boxing, track, and wrestling and an associate professor of health, physical education, and recreation. In 1963, he was appointed as Virginia State's acting athletic director.

== Head coaching record ==
=== Football ===
Year	Team	Overall	Conference	Standing	Bowl/playoffs
Howard Bison (Colored Intercollegiate Athletic Association) (1929–1933)
1929	Howard	0–7–2	0–1–1	8th	
1930	Howard	4–3–1	3–2–1	6th	
1931	Howard	3–5	2–5	6th	
1932	Howard	3–4	2–4	8th	
1933	Howard	3–5	3–3	7th	L Orange Blossom Classic
Howard:		13–24–3	10–15–2		
Total:		13–24–3			
