= 1945 Virginia State Trojans football team =

American college football season

1945 Virginia State Trojans football

CIAA champion

Piedmont Tobacco Bowl Classic, W 20–0 vs. North Carolina Central
- Conference: Colored Intercollegiate Athletic Association
- Record: 8–0–2 (6–0–1 CIAA)
- Head coach: Harry R. Jefferson (12th season)
- Home stadium: Rogers Athletic Field

1945 Colored Intercollegiate Athletic Association football standings
	Conf.					Overall
Team	W		L		T	W		L		T
Virginia State $	6	–	0	–	1	8	–	0	–	2
West Virginia State	4	–	0	–	2	5	–	1	–	2
North Carolina College	5	–	1	–	0	6	–	3	–	0
Johnson C. Smith	3	–	3	–	1	5	–	4	–	1
Morgan State	5	–	2	–	0	5	–	2	–	0
Howard	4	–	3	–	0	4	–	4	–	0
Virginia Union	4	–	3	–	0	4	–	4	–	0
Delaware State	3	–	3	–	0	4	–	3	–	0
Lincoln (PA)	2	–	4	–	0	2	–	5	–	0
North Carolina A&T	2	–	5	–	0	2	–	5	–	0
Hampton	2	–	6	–	0	2	–	6	–	0
Bluefield State	1	–	5	–	0	1	–	6	–	0
Shaw	0	–	6	–	0	0	–	6	–	0
$ – Conference champion; Conference standings were based on the Dickinson System.

The 1945 Virginia State Trojans football team was an American football team that represented Virginia State College as a member of the Colored Intercollegiate Athletic Association (CIAA) during the 1945 college football season. In their 12th season under head coach Harry R. Jefferson, the Trojans compiled an overall record of 8–0–2 record with a mark of 6–0–1 against CIAA opponents, winning the CIAA title, which was determined by the Dickinson System. Virginia State defeated North Carolina Central in the Piedmont Tobacco Bowl Classic. The team played home games at Rogers Athletic Field in Petersburg, Virginia.

== Schedule ==
Date	Time	Opponent	Site	Result	Attendance	Source
October 5	8:00 p.m.	at Norfolk Bombers*	Tar Park; Norfolk, VA	T 0–0		
October 13		Johnson C. Smith	Petersburg, VA	W 41–0		
October 20		at Hampton	Armstrong Field; Hampton, VA	W 35–0		
October 27		at Winston-Salem State*	Winston-Salem, NC	W 40–0		
November 3		West Virginia State	Petersburg, VA	T 6–6	6,500	
November 10		at Lincoln (PA)	Oxford, PA	W 26–6		
November 17		North Carolina A&T	Petersburg, VA	W 19–0		
November 22		Morgan State	Petersburg, VA	W 20–6		
December 1		Virginia Union^{†}	Rogers Athletic Field; Petersburg, VA	W 44–0	3,500	
December 8		at North Carolina College*	Durham Athletic Park; Durham, NC (Piedmont Tobacco Bowl Classic)	W 20–0	6,000	
*Non-conference game; ^{†}Homecoming; All times are in Eastern time
