= 1929 Tuskegee Golden Tigers football team =

American college football season

1929 Tuskegee Golden Tigers football

Black college national co-champion SIAC champion
- Conference: Southern Intercollegiate Athletic Conference
- Record: 9–0 (5–0 SIAC)
- Head coach: Cleve Abbott (7th season)
- Captain: Ben Stevenson
- Home stadium: Alumni Bowl

The 1929 Tuskegee Golden Tigers football team represented Tuskegee Normal and Industrial Institute—now Tuskegee University—in the Southern Intercollegiate Athletic Conference (SIAC) during the 1929 college football season. In their seventh season under head coach Cleve Abbott, Tuskegee compiled a 9–0 record, won the SIAC championship, shut out seven of 10 opponents, and outscored all opponents by a total of 249 to 45. The team was recognized as the black college national champion.

Ben Stevenson was the team captain.

== Schedule ==
| Date | Opponent | Site | Result | Attendance | Source |
|---|---|---|---|---|---|
| October 5 | North Carolina A&T* | Alumni Bowl; Tuskegee, AL | W 21–0 | | |
| October 11 | 24th Infantry, Fort Benning* | Alumni Bowl; Tuskegee, AL | W 24–7 | | |
| October 18 | vs. Clark (GA) | Legion Field; Birmingham, AL | W 21–0 | 7,500 | |
| October 26 | vs. Wilberforce* | Soldier Field; Chicago, IL | W 6–0 | 20,000 | |
| November 2 | Miles | Alumni Bowl; Tuskegee, AL | W 39–0 | | |
| November 9 | at Morris Brown | Spiller Field; Atlanta, GA | W 32–19 | | |
| November 16 | Florida A&M | Alumni Bowl; Tuskegee, AL | W 52–0 | | |
| November 23 | at Alabama State | Cramton Bowl; Montgomery, AL (rivalry) | W 20–0 | 6,000 | |
| November 28 | Bluefield*^{†} | Alumni Bowl; Tuskegee, AL | W 34–0 | 8,000 | |
*Non-conference game; ^{†}Homecoming
