= 1936 Virginia State Trojans football team =

American college football season

1936 Virginia State Trojans football

Black college national co-champion CIAA champion
- Conference: Colored Intercollegiate Athletic Association
- Record: 7–0–2 (6–0–2 CIAA)
- Head coach: Harry R. Jefferson (3rd season)
- Captain: Edward "Wimpy" Taylor
- Home stadium: Rogers Athletic Field

1936 Colored Intercollegiate Athletic Association football standings
	Conf.					Overall
Team	W		L		T	W		L		T
Virginia State $	6	–	0	–	2	7	–	0	–	2
Morgan	5	–	0	–	2	6	–	0	–	2
Bluefield State	3	–	0	–	3	3	–	2	–	4
Hampton	5	–	2	–	1	5	–	2	–	1
Shaw	3	–	2	–	0	5	–	3	–	1
North Carolina College	3	–	3	–	1	4	–	3	–	1
North Carolina A&T	4	–	4	–	0	5	–	4	–	0
Johnson C. Smith	1	–	2	–	1	2	–	3	–	3
Saint Paul (VA)	2	–	5	–	1	2	–	5	–	1
Virginia Union	2	–	5	–	1	2	–	5	–	1
Lincoln (PA)	1	–	4	–	0	1	–	4	–	0
St. Augustine's	0	–	4	–	0	0	–	4	–	0
Howard	0	–	4	–	0	0	–	5	–	0
$ – Conference champion; Conference standings were based on the Dickinson System.

The 1936 Virginia State Trojans football team was an American football team that represented Virginia State College as a member of the Colored Intercollegiate Athletic Association (CIAA) during the 1936 college football season. In their third season under head coach Harry R. Jefferson, the team compiled am overall record of 7–0–2 record with a mark of 6–0–2, winning the CIAA title. The team was recognized as the black college national co-champion along with West Virginia State.

Tackle Edward "Wimpy" Taylor was the team captain. Other key players included fullback Rudy Jeter, quarterback Horace Robinson, and halfbacks Ace Bailey and Henry "Red" Briscoe. Taylor and Briscoe were selected as first-team players on the Pittsburgh Courier's 1936 All-America team.

The team's assistant coaches were Thomas V. Verdelle, Roscoe "Turkey" Lewis, and James A. Moore.

== Schedule ==
Date	Time	Opponent	Site	Result	Attendance	Source
September 26		Bluefield State	Rogers Athletic Field; Petersburg, VA	T 0–0		
October 10		Hampton^{†}	Rogers Athletic Field; Petersburg, VA	W 12–7	3,800	
October 17	2:30 p.m.	Howard	Rogers Athletic Field; Petersburg, VA	W 13–6		
October 24	2:30 p.m.	at North Carolina A&T	Memorial Stadium; Greensboro, NC	W 14–7		
October 31	2:00 p.m.	at Virginia Union	Hovey Field; Richmond, VA	W 14–6		
November 7		at Shaw	Raleigh, NC	W 32–0		
November 14		at Saint Paul (VA)	Lawrenceville, VA	W 20–0		
November 21		at South Carolina State*	Orangeburg Fair Grounds; Orangeburg, SC	W 20–7		
November 26		Morgan	Rogers Athletic Field; Petersburg, VA	T 6–6	5,000	
*Non-conference game; ^{†}Homecoming; All times are in Eastern time
