= 1934 Howard Bison football team =

American college football season

1934 Howard Bison football
- Conference: Colored Intercollegiate Athletic Association
- Record: 2–6 (1–5 CIAA)
- Head coach: Charles Fremont West (2nd season)
- Home stadium: Howard Stadium

1934 Colored Intercollegiate Athletic Association football standings
	Conf.					Overall
Team	W		L		T	W		L		T
Morgan $	5	–	0	–	2	6	–	0	–	2
Bluefield State	7	–	0	–	1	8	–	0	–	1
North Carolina A&T	7	–	1	–	0	7	–	1	–	0
Virginia Union	4	–	2	–	2	4	–	2	–	2
Virginia State	4	–	3	–	1	4	–	4	–	1
Hampton	4	–	4	–	0	4	–	4	–	0
North Carolina College	4	–	4	–	0	4	–	5	–	0
St. Augustine's	1	–	2	–	1	3	–	2	–	1
Saint Paul (VA)	3	–	5	–	0	3	–	5	–	0
Howard	1	–	5	–	0	2	–	6	–	0
Shaw	1	–	6	–	0	1	–	6	–	1
Johnson C. Smith	0	–	4	–	1	0	–	5	–	1
Lincoln (PA)	0	–	5	–	0	1	–	6	–	0
$ – Conference champion; Conference standings were based on the Dickinson System. Howard forfeited conference wins over Hampton and Saint Paul and conference ties with Morgan and Virginia State.

The 1934 Howard Bison football team was an American football team that represented Howard University as a member of the Colored Intercollegiate Athletic Association (CIAA) during the 1934 college football season. The team was led by Charles Fremont West who returned for his second season as head coach after helming the team in 1928. The Bison finished the season with an overall record of 4–2–2 and a conference mark of 3–1–2, placing fifth in the CIAA standings, which were based on the Dickinson System. In December, after the season, the CIAA ruled halfback Paul Perkins was ineligible, and that Howard had to forfeit its victories over Saint Paul and Hampton and its ties with Virginia State and Morgan. The forfeits brought Howard's record to 2–6 overall and 1–5 in conference play, dropping the Bison to tenth place in the CIAA.

== Schedule ==
Date	Time	Opponent	Site	Result	Attendance	Source
October 6		at Cheyney*	Cheyney, PA	W 6–0		
October 13		at Saint Paul (VA)	Lawrenceville, VA	L 25–6 (forfeit)		
October 20		at Virginia State	Petersburg, VA	L 0–0 (forfeit)	2,000	
October 27		West Virginia State*	Howard Stadium; Washington, DC	L 6–7		
November 3		Morgan	Howard Stadium; Washington, DC	L 0–0 (forfeit)	5,000	
November 10		at Hampton	Hampton, VA	L 7–0 (forfeit)		
November 17		North Carolina College	Howard Stadium; Washington, DC	L 6–7		
November 29	1:30 p.m.	Lincoln (PA)	Howard Stadium; Washington, DC	W 13–6		
*Non-conference game; All times are in Eastern time
