= 1934 Virginia State Trojans football team =

American college football season

1936 Virginia State Trojans football

Orange Blossom Classic, L 12–13 vs. Florida A&M
- Conference: Colored Intercollegiate Athletic Association
- Record: 4–4–1 (4–3–1 CIAA)
- Head coach: Harry R. Jefferson (1st season)
- Home stadium: Rogers Athletic Field

1934 Colored Intercollegiate Athletic Association football standings
	Conf.					Overall
Team	W		L		T	W		L		T
Morgan $	5	–	0	–	2	6	–	0	–	2
Bluefield State	7	–	0	–	1	8	–	0	–	1
North Carolina A&T	7	–	1	–	0	7	–	1	–	0
Virginia Union	4	–	2	–	2	4	–	2	–	2
Virginia State	4	–	3	–	1	4	–	4	–	1
Hampton	4	–	4	–	0	4	–	4	–	0
North Carolina College	4	–	4	–	0	4	–	4	–	0
St. Augustine's	1	–	2	–	1	3	–	2	–	1
Saint Paul (VA)	3	–	5	–	0	3	–	5	–	0
Howard	1	–	5	–	0	2	–	6	–	0
Shaw	1	–	6	–	0	1	–	6	–	1
Johnson C. Smith	0	–	4	–	1	0	–	5	–	1
Lincoln (PA)	0	–	5	–	0	1	–	6	–	0
$ – Conference champion; Conference standings were based on the Dickinson System. Howard forfeited conference wins over Hampton and Saint Paul and conference ties with Morgan and Virginia State.

The 1934 Virginia State Trojans football team represented Virginia State College for Negroes—now known as Virginia State University—as a member of the Colored Intercollegiate Athletic Association (CIAA) during the 1934 college football season. Led by first-year head coach Harry R. Jefferson, the Trojans finished the season 3–4–2 overall and 3–3–2 in conference play, tying for sixth place in the CIAA standings, which were based on the Dickinson System. In December, Howard forfeited its tie with Virginia State due to an ineligible player, bringing the Trojans' record to 4–4–1 overall and 4–3–1 in conference play, and improving the team's CIAA standing to fifth place. Virginia State was invited to the Orange Blossom Classic, where the Trojans lost to Florida A&M. The team played home games at Rogers Athletic Field in Petersburg, Virginia.

== Schedule ==
Date	Time	Opponent	Site	Result	Attendance	Source
September 29	2:00 p.m.	Bluefield State	Rogers Athletic Field; Petersburg, VA	L 0–9	2,000	
October 13		Hampton	Rogers Athletic Field; Petersburg, VA	W 24–13		
October 20		Howard	Petersburg, VA	W 0–0 (forfeit win)	2,000	
October 27		at North Carolina A&T	World War Memorial Stadium; Greensboro, NC	L 6–7	1,200	
November 3		at Virginia Union	Hovey Field; Richmond, VA	T 0–0		
November 10		at Shaw	Alumni Field; Raleigh, NC	W 27–0		
November 17		at Saint Paul (VA)	Russell Field; Lawrenceville, VA	W 19–12		
November 29		Morgan	Rogers Athletic Field; Petersburg, VA	L 0–8		
December 8	2:30 p.m.	vs. Florida A&M*	Durkee Field; Jacksonville, FL (Orange Blossom Classic)	L 12–13		
*Non-conference game; All times are in Eastern time
