= Sylvester Hall =

American sports coach, educator (1910–1988)

Biographical details
- Born: 1910
- Died: August 26, 1988 (aged 77–78); Washington, D.C., U.S.

Playing career

Football
- c. 1930: Howard

Basketball
- c. 1930: Howard

Football
- c. 1930: Howard

Coaching career (HC unless noted)

Football
- 1942–1948: Cardozo HS (DC)
- 1949–1953: Virginia State
- 1954–1964: Cardozo HS (DC)

Basketball
- 1934–1935: Howard (assistant)

Head coaching record
- Overall: 25–16–2 (college football)

Accomplishments and honors

Championships
- 1 CIAA (1952)

Sylvester R. "Sal" Hall (1910 – August 26, 1988) was an American football and basketball coach and educator. He served as the head football coach at Virginia State College—now known as Virginia State University—from 1949 to 1953, compiling a record of 25–16–2.

Hall attended Howard University in Washington, D.C., where he competed in football, basketball, and track. He began his coaching career at his alma mater, Howard, as an assistant basketball coach. Hall coached football and track and served as the athletic director at Cardozo High School in Washington. He succeeded Harry R. Jefferson as head football coach at Virginia State in 1949, and was also appointed associate professor of physical education at the college.

After this tenure at Virginia State, Hall returned to Cardozo High, where the coached football and track and taught physical education until 1964. He was then the principal at Woodson Junior High School prior to his retirement in 1975. Hall died of a pulmonary embolism, on August 26, 1988, at the District of Columbia General Hospital

== Head coaching record ==
=== College football ===
Year	Team	Overall	Conference	Standing	Bowl/playoffs
Virginia State Trojans (Colored/Central Intercollegiate Athletic Association) (1949–1953)
1949	Virginia State	3–4–1	3–4–1	7th	
1950	Virginia State	3–5	3–5	10th	
1951	Virginia State	6–3	5–3	6th	
1952	Virginia State	8–1	7–0	1st	
1953	Virginia State	5–3–1	5–2–1	2nd	
Virginia State:		25–16–2	23–14–2		
Total:		25–16–2			
National championship Conference title Conference division title or championship game berth
