= 1936 West Virginia State Yellow Jackets football team =

American college football season

1936 West Virginia State Yellow Jackets football

Black college national co-champion MWAA co-champion
- Conference: Midwest Athletic Association
- Record: 7–0–1 (3–0–1 MWAA)
- Head coach: Adolph Hamblin (16th season)

1936 Midwest Athletic Association football standings
	Conf.					Overall
Team	W		L		T	W		L		T
West Virginia State +	3	–	0	–	1	7	–	0	–	1
Wilberforce +	3	–	0	–	1	6	–	1	–	1
Kentucky State	1	–	2	–	1	3	–	2	–	3
Lincoln (MO)	0	–	2	–	1	1	–	6	–	1
Louisville Municipal	0	–	3	–	0	4	–	3	–	0
+ – Conference co-champions

The 1936 West Virginia State Yellow Jackets football team was an American football team that represented West Virginia State College—now known as West Virginia State University—as a member of the Midwest Athletic Association (MWAA) during the 1936 college football season. Under head coach Adolph Hamblin, the Yellow Jackets compiled an overall record of 7–0–1 with a mark of 3–0–1 in conference play, sharing the MWAA title with Wilberforce, and outscored opponents by a total of 110 to 12. The team was recognized as the black college national co-champion along with Virginia State.

Floyd "Butch" Meadows of West Virginia State was selected as the first-team quarterback on the Pittsburgh Courier's 1936 All-America team.

West Virginia State College had an enrollment of 664 students in the fall of 1936.

== Schedule ==
Date	Opponent	Site	Result	Attendance	Source
October 3	Louisville Municipal	Louisville, KY	W 21–0		
October 10	Lincoln (MO)	Lakin Field; Institute, WV	W 27–0	3,000	
October 17	Morehouse*	Lakin Field; Institute, WV	W 12–6		
October 24	at Howard*	Washington, DC	W 25–0		
October 31	at Bluefield State*	Bluefield, WV	W 6–0	3,000	
November 7	Kentucky State^{†}	Lakin Field; Institute, WV	W 6–0	4,000	
November 14	at Tennessee State*	Nashville, TN	W 7–0		
November 26	Wilberforce	Lakin Field; Institute, WV	T 6–6	5,000	
*Non-conference game; ^{†}Homecoming
