= 1949 West Virginia State Yellow Jackets football team =

American college football season

1949 West Virginia State Yellow Jackets football
- Conference: Colored Intercollegiate Athletic Association
- Record: 8–0–1 (5–0–1 CIAA)
- Head coach: Mark Cardwell (5th season)
- Home stadium: Lakin Field

1949 Colored Intercollegiate Athletic Association football standings
	Conf.					Overall
Team	W		L		T	W		L		T
No. 1 Morgan State $	7	–	0	–	0	8	–	0	–	0
No. 2 West Virginia State	5	–	0	–	1	8	–	0	–	1
No. 6 North Carolina A&T	5	–	1	–	0	7	–	2	–	0
No. 6 Shaw	7	–	2	–	0	7	–	2	–	0
No. 25 St. Augustine's	5	–	2	–	0	6	–	2	–	0
No. 21 Virginia State	4	–	2	–	1	4	–	2	–	1
No. 22 Howard	6	–	3	–	0	6	–	3	–	0
No. 24 North Carolina College	3	–	4	–	0	5	–	4	–	0
No. 13 Hampton	3	–	4	–	0	5	–	4	–	0
Winston-Salem State	1	–	2	–	3	3	–	3	–	3
Delaware State	3	–	5	–	1	3	–	5	–	1
Johnson C. Smith	2	–	3	–	1	2	–	4	–	1
Lincoln (PA)	2	–	4	–	0	3	–	5	–	0
Bluefield State	1	–	5	–	1	2	–	5	–	1
Virginia Union	0	–	7	–	0	0	–	8	–	0
Saint Paul's (VA)	0	–	8	–	0	0	–	8	–	0
$ – Conference champion; Rankings from the Pittsburgh Courier

The 1949 West Virginia State Yellow Jackets football team was an American football team that represented West Virginia State University as a member of the Colored Intercollegiate Athletic Association (CIAA) during the 1949 college football season. In their fifth season under head coach Mark Cardwell, the team compiled an 8–0–1 record and outscored opponents by a total of 197 to 79. The team ranked No. 3 among the nation's black college football teams according to the Pittsburgh Courier and its Dickinson Rating System. The team played its home games at Lakin Field in Institute, West Virginia.

Key players included quarterback Joe Gilliam, fullback Oliver Ellis, halfbacks Alfred Graves, Charlie Fairfax, and Jack Taylor, ends Clarence "Bump" Clark, Horace Christian, and John Gist, tackle Ed Wickliffe, and kicker Alfred Melchor.

== Schedule ==
Date	Opponent	Site	Result	Attendance	Source
September 23	at Virginia Union	Union Athletic Field; Richmond, VA	W 13–6		
October 1	Howard	Lakin Field; Institute, WV	W 27–6		
October 8	at Kentucky State*	Frankfort, KY	W 33–6		
October 15	Tennessee A&I*	Lakin Field; Institute, WV	W 25–21	> 3,000	
October 22	at St. Augustine's	Raleigh, NC	W 2–0		
October 29	Bluefield State	Lakin Field; Institute, WV	W 42–7	5,000	
November 5	at Virginia State	Petersburg, VA	T 27–27	5,000	
November 12	vs. North Carolina College	Griffith Stadium; Washington, DC (Capital Classic)	W 14–0	30,400	
November 19	at Wilberforce State*	Wilberforce, OH	W 14–6	3,000	
*Non-conference game
