= 1934 Florida A&M Rattlers football team =

American college football season

1934 Florida A&M Rattlers football

Orange Blossom Classic, W 13–12 vs. Virginia State
- Conference: Southern Intercollegiate Athletic Conference
- Record: 5–3–1 (3–3 SIAC)
- Head coach: Eugene J. Bragg (1st season)

1934 Southern Intercollegiate Athletic Conference football standings
	Conf.					Overall
Team	W		L		T	W		L		T
Morris Brown $	5	–	0	–	2	7	–	1	–	2
Tuskegee	3	–	2	–	1	6	–	5	–	1
South Carolina State	2	–	1	–	1	5	–	2	–	1
Florida A&M	3	–	3	–	0	5	–	3	–	1
Alabama State	2	–	2	–	2	4	–	4	–	2
Talladega	3	–	0	–	1	4	–	0	–	1
Clark (GA)	1	–	3	–	2	3	–	4	–	2
Morehouse	3	–	3	–	2	4	–	3	–	2
LeMoyne	1	–	1	–	2	5	–	1	–	2
Benedict	0	–	2	–	2	2	–	2	–	3
Knoxville	1	–	3	–	1	2	–	4	–	1
Fisk	0	–	4	–	0	0	–	5	–	1
$ – Conference champion; Standings were based on Dickinson System ratings.

The 1934 Florida A&M Rattlers football team represented Florida Agricultural and Mechanical College for Negroes—now known as Florida A&M University as a member of the Southern Intercollegiate Athletic Conference (SIAC) during the 1934 college football season. Led by first-year head coach Eugene J. Bragg, the Rattlers compiled an overall record of 5–3–1 with a mark of 3–3, placing fourth in the SIAC standings, which were determined by Dickinson System ratings.

== Schedule ==
Date	Time	Opponent	Site	Result	Attendance	Source
October 6	2:00 p.m. or 3:00 p.m.	at Morehouse	Atlanta, GA	W 7–0		
October 12		at Claflin*	Orangeburg, SC	T 6–6		
October 19		vs. Straight*	Legion Field; Pensacola, FL	W 7–0		
October 27		Alabama State	Tallahassee, FL	W 7–6		
November 2	3:00 p.m.	South Carolina State	Tallahassee, FL	L 0–6		
November 9		at Tuskegee	Tuskegee, AL	L 7–26		
November 17	2:00 p.m.	at Benedict	Columbia, SC	W 13–6		
November 24		Morris Brown	Tallahassee, FL	L 6–9	3,000	
December 8	2:30 p.m.	vs. Virginia State*	Durkee Field; Jacksonville, FL (Orange Blossom Classic)	W 13–12		
*Non-conference game; All times are in Eastern time
