= 1929 Florida A&M Rattlers football team =

American college football season

1929 Florida A&M Rattlers football
- Conference: Southern Intercollegiate Athletic Conference
- Record: 0–4–2 (0–3 SIAC)
- Head coach: W. McKinley King (1st season)
- Captain: Oliver Wilkins

The 1929 Florida A&M Rattlers football team represented represented Florida Agricultural and Mechanical College for Negroes (FAMC)—now known as Florida A&M University—as a member of the Southern Intercollegiate Athletic Conference (SIAC) during the 1929 college football season. Led by W. McKinley King in first and only season as head coach, the Rattlers compiled an overall record of 0–4–2 with a mark of 0–3 in conference play. Oliver Wilkins, who played at halfback, was elected team captain.

== Schedule ==
Date	Time	Opponent	Site	Result	Attendance	Source
October 4	9:00 p.m.	at Alabama State	Cramton Bowl; Montgomery, AL	L 0–6	2,000	
October 18	2:30 p.m.	at Morris Brown	Morris Brown athletic field; Atlanta, GA	L 0–24		
November 1		Bethune–Cookman*	Tallahassee, FL	T 6–6		
November 16		at Tuskegee	Alumni Bowl; Tuskegee, AL	L 0–52		
November 28		Florida Normal*		T 0–0		
December 25	3:00 p.m.	at Edward Waters*	Durkee Field; Jacksonville, FL	L 12–13		
*Non-conference game; All times are in Eastern time
