= William Mahood =

American politician

William Mahood was a state legislator in West Virginia. He represented the 7th District in Mercer County, West Virginia in the West Virginia Senate. He was a Republican.

During his service in the Senate, he helped establish Bluefield Colored Institute in 1895.
