= W. McKinley King =

Biographical details
- Born: May 11, 1904
- Died: June 1, 1946 (aged 42); Savannah, Georgia, U.S.
- Education: Hampton (BS); Iowa State (MS)

Coaching career (HC unless noted)
- 1929: Florida A&M
- 1930: Florida A&M (assistant)
- 1940–1941: Georgia State

Head coaching record
- Overall: 4–10–4

William McKinley King (May 11, 1904 – June 1, 1946) was an American football coach and educator. He served as the head football coach at Florida Agricultural and Mechanical College for Negroes (now known as Florida A&M University) in 1929 and Georgia State College (now known as Savannah State University) from 1940 to 1941.

A native of Virginia, King earned degrees from Hampton Institute (now known as Hampton University) and Iowa State College (now known as Iowa State University). King was the head football coach at Florida A&M in 1929. The following season, he assisted Jubie Bragg in coaching the team. King taught at both Florida A&M and Georgia State. He was killed in an automobile accident, on June 1, 1946, in Savannah, Georgia.

== Head coaching record ==
Year	Team	Overall	Conference	Standing	Bowl/playoffs
Florida A&M Wildcats / Rattlers (Southern Intercollegiate Athletic Conference) (1929)
1929	Florida A&M	0–4–2	0–3		
Florida A&M:		0–4–2	0–3		
Georgia State Tigers (Southeastern Athletic Conference) (1940–1941)
1940	Georgia State	3–3–1			
1941	Georgia State	1–3–1			
Georgia State:		4–10–4			
Total:		4–10–4			
