= Mark Cardwell =

American athlete and coach (1901–1964)

Biographical details
- Born: January 7, 1901; Columbus, Ohio, U.S.
- Died: March 20, 1964 (aged 63); Morgantown, West Virginia, U.S.

Playing career

Football
- c. 1921–1924: West Virginia State
- Position: Fullback

Coaching career (HC unless noted)

Football
- 1925–1944: Kelly Miller HS (WV)
- 1945–1957: West Virginia State

Basketball
- 1945–1964: West Virginia State

Head coaching record
- Overall: 64–40–10 (college football)
- Bowls: 0–1

Accomplishments and honors

Championships
- Football; 2 CIAA (1948, 1951) Basketball; 3 CIAA regular season (1948–1949, 1951)

Mark Hanna Cardwell (January 7, 1901 – March 20, 1964) was an American football, basketball, and baseball player and coach. He served as the head football coach at West Virginia State College—now known as West Virginia State University—in Institute, West Virginia from 1945 to 1957. Cardwell was also the head basketball coach at West Virginia State for 19 seasons from 1945 until his death in 1964. Cardwellled West Virginia State to Central Intercollegiate Athletic Association (CIAA) championships in football in 1948 and 1951 and in basketball in 1948, 1949, and 1951.

A native of Columbus, Ohio, Cardwell attended East High School, where the played football alongside Chic Harley, who went on to star at Ohio State University. Cardwell played football, basketball and baseball at West Virginia State from 1921 to 1925, when the school was known as West Virginia Collegiate Institute. In football, he played as a fullback, starting for teams coached by Adolph Hamblin. Cardwell began coaching career in 1925 at Kelly Miller High School in Clarksburg, West Virginia, remaining there until 1945 when he returned to West Virginia State to succeed Hamblin as head football coach and also coached baseball and track.

Cardwell died of a heart attack, on March 20, 1964, in Morgantown, West Virginia.

== Head coaching record ==
=== College football ===
Year	Team	Overall	Conference	Standing	Bowl/playoffs
West Virginia State Yellow Jackets (Colored/Central Intercollegiate Athletic Association) (1945–1953)
1945	West Virginia State	5–1–2	4–0–2	2nd	
1946	West Virginia State	6–3–1	5–2	2nd	L Derby Bowl
1947	West Virginia State	7–2–1	4–1–1	6th	
1948	West Virginia State	5–2–2	5–1	1st	
1949	West Virginia State	8–0	7–0	1st	
1950	West Virginia State	5–3–1	3–2–1	4th	
1951	West Virginia State	6–2–1	5–0–1	1st	
1952	West Virginia State	6–4	5–3	4th	
1953	West Virginia State	6–3	4–2	5th	
1954	West Virginia State	3–6	1–5	14th	
West Virginia State Yellow Jackets (Central Intercollegiate Athletic Association / West Virginia Intercollegiate Athletic Conference) (1945–1953)
1955	West Virginia State	1–7	0–6 / 0–1	17th / NA	
West Virginia State Yellow Jackets (West Virginia Intercollegiate Athletic Conference) (1956–1957)
1956	West Virginia State	4–3	1–0	NA	
1957	West Virginia State	2–4–2	2–1–1	3rd	
West Virginia State:		64–40–10	46–23–6		
Total:		64–40–10			
National championship Conference title Conference division title or championship game berth
