= Eugene J. Bragg =

American college football player and coach (1907–1936)

Biographical details
- Born: 1907; Tallahassee, Florida, U.S.
- Died: January 24, 1936; Tallahassee, Florida, U.S.

Playing career
- c. 1927: Florida A&M
- Position: Fullback

Coaching career (HC unless noted)
- 1934–1935: Florida A&M

Head coaching record
- Overall: 23–22–5
- Bowls: 1–1

Eugene James Bragg (1907 – January 24, 1936) was an American college football player and coach. He served as the head football coach at Florida Agricultural and Mechanical College for Negroes—now known as Florida A&M University—in Tallahassee, Florida, from 1934 to 1935.

Bragg was born in 1907, in Tallahassee. He attended Florida A&M, where he played football as a fullback before graduating in 1928. He worked as an agricultural agent in Gadsden County, Florida, and then earned a master's degree from Iowa State College of Agriculture and Mechanic Arts—now known as Iowa State University. In addition to coaching at his alma mater, Florida A&M, Bragg was an instructor in the college's agricultural division.

Bragg died of appendicitis, on January 24, 1936, at Florida A&M's hospital in Tallahassee. He was survived by his father, Jubie Bragg, longtime coach and athletic director at Florida A&M.

== Head coaching record ==
Year	Team	Overall	Conference	Standing	Bowl/playoffs
Florida A&M Rattlers (Southern Intercollegiate Athletic Conference) (1934–1935)
1934	Florida A&M	5–3–1	3–3	4th	W Orange Blossom Classic
1935	Florida A&M	4–5	2–4	6th	L Orange Blossom Classic
Florida A&M:		9–8–1	6–7		
Total:		9–8–1			
