= 1934 Morgan Bears football team =

American college football season

1934 Morgan Bears football

CIAA champion
- Conference: Colored Intercollegiate Athletic Association
- Record: 6–0–2 (5–0–2 CIAA)
- Head coach: Edward P. Hurt (4th season)
- Home stadium: Bugle Field

1934 Colored Intercollegiate Athletic Association football standings
	Conf.					Overall
Team	W		L		T	W		L		T
Morgan $	5	–	0	–	2	6	–	0	–	2
Bluefield State	7	–	0	–	1	8	–	0	–	1
North Carolina A&T	7	–	1	–	0	7	–	1	–	0
Virginia Union	4	–	2	–	2	4	–	2	–	2
Virginia State	4	–	3	–	1	4	–	4	–	1
Hampton	4	–	4	–	0	4	–	4	–	0
North Carolina College	4	–	4	–	0	4	–	5	–	0
St. Augustine's	1	–	2	–	1	3	–	2	–	1
Saint Paul (VA)	3	–	5	–	0	3	–	5	–	0
Howard	1	–	5	–	0	2	–	6	–	0
Shaw	1	–	6	–	0	1	–	6	–	1
Johnson C. Smith	0	–	4	–	1	0	–	5	–	1
Lincoln (PA)	0	–	5	–	0	1	–	6	–	0
$ – Conference champion; Conference standings were based on the Dickinson System. Howard forfeited conference wins over Hampton and Saint Paul and conference ties with Morgan and Virginia State.

The 1934 Morgan Bears football team was an American football team that represented Morgan College as a member of the Colored Intercollegiate Athletic Association (CIAA) during the 1934 college football season. Led by fourth-year head coach Edward P. Hurt, the Bears finished the season with an overall record of 5–0–3 with a conference mark of 4–0–3, winning the CIAA title. Morgan shut out all eight of their opponents, scoring 96 points and allowing 0 on the season. After the season, Howard forfeited their tie with Morgan because of an ineligible player, improved the Bears's record to 6–0–2 overall and 5–0–2 in CIAA competition.

== Schedule ==
Date	Opponent	Site	Result	Attendance	Source
September 29	Cheyney*	Baltimore, MD	W 34–0		
October 5	at North Carolina A&T	World War Memorial Stadium; Greensboro, NC	W 7–0		
October 13	Virginia Union	Bugle Field; Baltimore, MD	T 0–0		
October 20	Lincoln (PA)^{†}	Baltimore, MD	W 19–0		
October 26	at Bluefield State	Bluefield, WV	T 0–0		
November 3	Howard	Howard Stadium; Washington, DC	T 0–0	5,000	
November 17	Hampton	Baltimore, MD	W 28–0		
November 29	at Virginia State	Rogers Athletic Field; Petersburg, VA	W 8–0		
*Non-conference game; ^{†}Homecoming
