= John Pennington (American football) =

American football coach (born 1981)

Current position
- Title: Head coach
- Team: West Virginia State
- Conference: MEC
- Record: 49–42

Biographical details
- Born: December 5, 1981 (age 44); Charleston, West Virginia, U.S.
- Education: West Virginia University (2005); West Virginia Wesleyan College (2007); Capella University (2017)

Playing career
- 2001–2004: West Virginia
- Position: Wide receiver

Coaching career (HC unless noted)
- 2005: West Virginia Wesleyan (GA)
- 2006: West Virginia Wesleyan (WR)
- 2007: West Virginia Wesleyan (DB)
- 2008–2010: West Virginia Lightning (OC/WR)
- 2008–2009: West Virginia Tech (OL/DB)
- 2010: West Virginia State (ST/OL)
- 2011–2014: Concord (ST/RB)
- 2015–2016: West Virginia State (OC/QB)
- 2017–present: West Virginia State

Head coaching record
- Overall: 49–42

John Pennington (born December 5, 1981) is an American football coach. He is the head football coach for West Virginia State University, a position he has held since 2017. He also coached for West Virginia Wesleyan, West Virginia Tech, Concord, and semi-professional team the West Virginia Lightning of the Heartland Football League (HFL). He played college football for West Virginia as a wide receiver.

== Head coaching record ==
Year	Team	Overall	Conference	Standing	Bowl/playoffs
West Virginia State Yellow Jackets (Mountain East Conference) (2017–present)
2017	West Virginia State	6–5	5–5	T–4th	
2018	West Virginia State	6–5	5–5	T–5th	
2019	West Virginia State	7–4	7–3	T–2nd	
2020–21	West Virginia State	2–2	2–2	4th (South)	
2021	West Virginia State	6–5	6–4	T–4th	
2022	West Virginia State	7–4	6–4	T–4th	
2023	West Virginia State	4–6	4–5	T–7th	
2024	West Virginia State	6–5	5–4	T–5th	
2025	West Virginia State	5–6	4–4	5th	
West Virginia State:		49–42	44–36		
Total:		49–42			
