= Jon Anderson (American football) =

American football coach and former player

Current position
- Title: Defensive quality control
- Team: Old Dominion
- Conference: Sun Belt

Biographical details
- Education: Buena Vista (1999); South Dakota State (2003)

Playing career
- 1995–1998: Buena Vista

Coaching career (HC unless noted)
- 1999–2000: Buena Vista (DB)
- 2001: Dakota State (LB/ST)
- 2002–2012: Sioux Falls (DC)
- 2013–2016: West Virginia State
- 2017–2022: Sioux Falls
- 2023–present: Old Dominion (DQC)

Head coaching record
- Overall: 50–51
- Tournaments: 0–2 (NCAA D-II playoffs)

Jon Anderson is an American college football coach and former player. He is a defensive quality control coach at Old Dominion University. He was the head football coach at the University of Sioux Falls from 2017 to 2022. Anderson served as the head football coach at West Virginia State University from 2013 to 2016.

== Head coaching record ==
Year	Team	Overall	Conference	Standing	Bowl/playoffs	AFCA^{#}
West Virginia State Yellow Jackets (Mountain East Conference) (2013–2016)
2013	West Virginia State	0–11	0–10	11th		
2014	West Virginia State	2–9	1–9	11th		
2015	West Virginia State	5–6	5–5	T–5th		
2016	West Virginia State	3–8	3–7	T–8th		
West Virginia State:		10–34	9–31			
Sioux Falls Cougars (Northern Sun Intercollegiate Conference) (2017–2022)
2017	Sioux Falls	9–3	9–2 / 5–2	T–3rd / 3rd (South)	L NCAA Division II First Round	20
2018	Sioux Falls	7–4	7–4 / 5–2	T–5th / T–2nd (South)		
2019	Sioux Falls	8–4	8–3 / 4–3	T–3rd / T–3rd (South)	L NCAA Division II First Round	
2020–21	No team—COVID-19					
2021	Sioux Falls	8–3	8–3 / 5–1	4th / T–1st (South)		
2022	Sioux Falls	8–3	8–3 / 3–3	T–4th / T–4th (South)		
Sioux Falls:		40–17	40–15			
Total:		50–51				
