= Bob Gobel =

American football coach (born 1955)

Biographical details
- Born: November 16, 1955 (age 70)

Coaching career (HC unless noted)
- 1989: West Virginia Tech
- 1990–1991: West Virginia State
- 1992–1995: West Virginia Tech

Head coaching record
- Overall: 18–52–1

Bob Gobel (born November 16, 1955) is an American football coach. He served two stints as the head football coach at West Virginia University Institute of Technology in Montgomery, West Virginia, in 1989 and from 1992 to 1995, and as the head football coach at West Virginia State University in Institute, West Virginia from 1990 to 1991, compiling a career college football coaching record of 18–52–1.

== Head coaching record ==
Year	Team	Overall	Conference	Standing	Bowl/playoffs
West Virginia Tech Golden Bears (West Virginia Intercollegiate Athletic Conference) (1989)
1989	West Virginia Tech	7–3–1	5–0–1	T–1st	
West Virginia State Yellow Jackets (West Virginia Intercollegiate Athletic Conference) (1990–1991)
1990	West Virginia State	4–6	3–3	4th	
1991	West Virginia State	6–4	4–3	3rd	
West Virginia State:		10–10	7–6		
West Virginia Tech Golden Bears (West Virginia Intercollegiate Athletic Conference) (1992–1995)
1992	West Virginia Tech	0–10	0–7	8th	
1993	West Virginia Tech	0–10	0–7	8th	
1994	West Virginia Tech	1–9	1–5	6th	
1995	West Virginia Tech	0–10	0–7	8th	
West Virginia Tech:		8–42–1	6–26–1		
Total:		18–52–1			
National championship Conference title Conference division title or championship game berth
