= Jubie Bragg =

American football coach and college athletic administrator (1876–1947)

Biographical details
- Born: February 17, 1876; Macon, Georgia, U.S.
- Died: November 26, 1947 (aged 71); Tallahassee, Florida, U.S.

Playing career
- 1890s: Tuskegee

Coaching career (HC unless noted)
- 1907–1909: Florida A&M
- 1913: Jackson
- 1920–1925: Florida A&M
- 1920–1922: Talladega
- 1930: Florida A&M

Administrative career (AD unless noted)
- 1930–1945: Florida A&M

Head coaching record
- Overall: 21–17–4

Accomplishments and honors

Championships
- 2 black national (1920–1921)

Jubie Barton Bragg (February 17, 1876 – November 26, 1947) was an American college football coach an athletics administrator. He was the first head football coach at Florida A&M University in Tallahassee, Florida. Bragg coached the team off and on from 1907 through 1930 and also served as head football coach at Alabama's Talladega College, leading that school to shared black college football national championships in 1920 and 1921. His son, Eugene J. Bragg, was head football coach at Florida A&M from 1934 to 1935. Bragg was a charter member of Alpha Phi Alpha fraternity's Beta Nu chapter on the campus of Florida A&M.

Bragg played football at Tuskegee Normal and Industrial Institute—now known as Tuskegee University—in the 1890s. He died on November 26, 1947, in Tallahassee. Florida A&M's football stadium, Bragg Memorial Stadium, is named in his honor.

== Head coaching record ==
Year	Team	Overall	Conference	Standing	Bowl/playoffs
Florida A&M Wildcats (Independent) (1907–1909)
1907	Florida A&M	0–1			
1908	Florida A&M	0–1			
1909	Florida A&M	0–1			
Jackson Tigers (Independent) (1913)
1913	Jackson	1–0			
Jackson:		1–0			
Florida A&M Wildcats (Southeastern Intercollegiate Athletic Conference) (1920–1925)
1920	Florida A&M	0–2	0–2		
1921	Florida A&M	0–1–1	0–1–1		
1922	Florida A&M	0–1–1	0–1–1		
1923	Florida A&M	1–0	1–0		
1924	Florida A&M	0–1	0–1		
1925	Florida A&M	1–2	0–2		
Florida A&M Rattlers (Southern Intercollegiate Athletic Conference) (1930)
1930	Florida A&M	2–4	0–3		
Florida A&M:		4–14–2	1–10–2		
Talladega (Independent) (1920–1922)
1920	Talladega	6–0			
1921	Talladega	4–0–1			
1922	Talladega	3–4–1			
Talladega:		13–4–2			
Total:		21–17–4			
