= Colin Cameron (American football) =

American football coach and athletic director

Coaching career (HC unless noted)
- 1967: West Virginia State (asssitant)
- 1968–1976: West Virginia State
- 1992–1995: West Virginia Tech

Administrative career (AD unless noted)
- 1969–1977: West Virginia State
- 1977–1997: Fairmont State

Head coaching record
- Overall: 37–47–2

Accomplishments and honors

Championships
- 1x West Virginia Intercollegiate Athletic Conference champion (1968)

Colin Cameron is an American football coach and administrator who was the head football coach at West Virginia State University from 1968 to 1976, and athletic director at West Virginia State from 1969 to 1977 and Fairmont State University from 1977 to 1997.

== Career ==
An assistant professor of physical education at Michigan State University, Cameron came to West Virginia State in 1967 as an assistant football coach. He was promoted to head coach the following year and led the Yellow Jackets to a West Virginia Intercollegiate Athletic Conference football championship. He became the school's athletic director in 1969. From 1977 to 1997, Cameron was the athletic director at Fairmont State. He led the school during its move from NAIA to NCAA Division II.

== Honors ==
Cameron was inducted into the NAIA (1991), National Association of Collegiate Directors of Athletics (1996), Fairmont State University Athletics (1997), and the West Virginia State University Sports (2018) hall of fames. In 1990, he received the Mike McLaughlin Administrative Memorial Award for contributions to the WVIAC.
