= Henry Lake Dickason =

African American academic administrator (1886–1957)

Dr. Henry Lake Dickason (September 9, 1886 – April 6, 1957) was the president of Bluefield State College in West Virginia from 1936 to 1952 and Morristown College in Tennessee from 1953 to 1957.

== Family and early life ==
Henry Lake Dickason was born near Lindside, West Virginia on September 9, 1886. He was the second of three children born to Guy and Fannie Dickason. His paternal grandparents, Raeburn and Nancy Jane Dickason, had been slaves to Jacob Dickason. When Jacob Dickason died, he left all his worldly possessions, including land, to the Dickasons.

Dickason attended Chestnut Grove School for his early schooling. He began attending high school at Bluefield Colored Institute (BCI) in Bluefield, West Virginia, in 1903. While there, he worked at Bluefield Hardware. Dickason graduated in 1906.

== Higher education ==
Bluefield Colored Institute formed a normal school to train teachers to meet the needs of the many segregated schools. Dickason started the teaching course in 1907 and then applied to Ohio State University and was accepted. He graduated in 1913 with a Bachelor of Arts in Mathematics and earned his Master of Arts in Math and Physics the following year. He was elected the General President of Alpha Phi Alpha, the first African-American Greek-lettered fraternity.

== Early teaching career and family life ==
After graduating, Dickason returned to Bluefield Colored Institute (BCI) to begin his teaching career. He taught mathematics, assistant coached the football team and led several school organizations.

On August 26, 1914, Dickason married Grace Robinson. They both continued teaching at BCI. Grace died on December 27, 1919. Dickason became vice-principal of the BCI by 1923.

== Bluefield State Teacher’s College Dean ==
In 1931, the name of the school was changed to Bluefield State Teacher's College, the high school program was discontinued, and Dickason was appointed dean. In 1932, Dickason married Flossie Mack, a teacher at Bluefield.

== Bluefield State Teacher’s College President ==
In 1936, at the age of 49, Dickason was appointed acting president of Bluefield State Teacher's College. Within months of his appointment, a devastating fire destroyed Mahood Hall, the main building on campus, on April 23, 1937. The gymnasium, auditorium, library, administrative records, classrooms, and chemistry lab were all lost. The damage was estimated at $150,000. By 1938, a new gymnasium and 700-seat auditorium named Arter Hall was completed.

In 1938, Dickason was inaugurated as the appointed President of Bluefield State Teachers’ College. Dickason led the college as a new wing was added to Conley Hall to house a new library, a new women's dorm, and a men's dorm were built, faculty houses were built and the land was acquired to eventually build a new Technical Education building.

Dickason received a U.S. government appointment as a consultant in the National Youth Administration. Dickason chartered the Pi chapter in 1914 as the fifteenth chapter of Alpha Phi Alpha. It was the first Black Greek Letter organization in Cleveland, Ohio. He served as National General Secretary and General President of Alpha Phi Alpha. In 1941, the Dickasons adopted five-year-old Robert Andrew Dickason.

== Bluefield State College President ==
In 1943, Bluefield State Teachers’ College was renamed Bluefield State College. Its expanding curriculum now included nursing classes, partly as a result of World War II and the need for nurses in the military. In 1949, Dickason guided Bluefield State College to meet the requirements of the North Central Association of Colleges and Schools and be granted full accreditation. A new Division of Vocational Training was added and included courses in carpentry, plumbing, sheet metal, auto repair, and others. Dickason oversaw the construction of a building to house this new Division. The Technical Education Building was later renamed Dickason Hall. In 1952, at the age of 65, Dickason retired. His tenure at Bluefield spanned 38 years.

== Morristown College President ==
Within the first year of his retirement, Dickason was asked to serve as President of Morristown College in Tennessee, a historically black college. He moved there in 1953 and began his tenure as President of Morristown College.

== Death ==
In March 1957, he was hospitalized with chest pains. He died on April 6, 1957, at the age of 70.

== Honors ==
Dickason was awarded two honorary doctorates: a Doctorate of Pedagogy from Virginia State College in 1942, and a Doctorate of Literary Law from West Virginia State College in 1948. In 1959, the Technical Science Building at Bluefield State College, constructed under Dickason's Presidency, was designated the H.L. Dickason Hall. The Peters Mountain Chapter of the Daughters of the American Revolution honored Dr. Dickason on June 1, 2015, when a marker was unveiled in Lindside, Virginia in his memory.
