= Adolph Hamblin =

American athlete and coach (1896–1966)

Biographical details
- Born: January 11, 1896; Galesburg, Illinois, U.S.
- Died: August 17, 1966; South Charleston, West Virginia, U.S.
- Education: Knox College

Coaching career (HC unless noted)

Football
- 1921–1944: West Virginia State

Accomplishments and honors

Championships
- 2 Black college national (1922, 1936)

Awards
- West Virginia Sports Hall of Fame (1968); Knox-Lombard Athletic Hall of Fame (1987)

Adolph Putnam "Ziggy" Hamblin (January 11, 1896 – August 17, 1966) was an American football, basketball, and baseball player and coach.

A native of Galesburg, Illinois, Hamblin attended Knox College in that city. He received 16 varsity letters at Knox, competing in football, basketball, baseball, and track.

He served as the head football coach at West Virginia State College from 1921 to 1944. He led the 1936 West Virginia State Yellow Jackets football team to the black college football national championship. He also coached the basketball and baseball teams and was a professor of biology for 45 years.

In 1987, Hamblin was posthumously inducted into the Knox-Lombard Athletic Hall of Fame. In addition, the science building at West Virginia State was named for him.

== Head coaching record ==
Year	Team	Overall	Conference	Standing	Bowl/playoffs
West Virginia State Yellow Jackets (Independent) (1921–1924)
1921	West Virginia State				
1922	West Virginia State	3–0–1			W Black National Championship
1923	West Virginia State				
1924	West Virginia State				
West Virginia State Yellow Jackets (Midwest Athletic Association (MWAA) (1925–1941)
1925	West Virginia State				
1926	West Virginia State				
1927	West Virginia State				
1928	West Virginia State				
1929	West Virginia State				
1930	West Virginia State	3–3–1			
1931	West Virginia State	4–3			
1932	West Virginia State	2–5–2			
1933	West Virginia State	4–5			
1934	West Virginia State	6–3–1			
1935	West Virginia State	6–3			
1936	West Virginia State	7–0–1	3–0–1	1st	W Black National Championship
1937	West Virginia State	3–3–1			
1938	West Virginia State	3–4–1	0–0		
1939	West Virginia State	2–3–1			
1940	West Virginia State	2–5–1	1–4		
1941	West Virginia State	3–4–1	2–2–1		
West Virginia State Yellow Jackets (Colored Intercollegiate Athletic Association (CIAA) (1942–1944)
1942	West Virginia State	6–2	2–2	10th	
1943	West Virginia State	2–6	0–2		
1944	West Virginia State	2–4–1	0–2		
Total:					
