= Kelly Miller High School =

Location
- 39°16′36″N 80°20′09″W

Information
- Former name: Water Street Colored School (1903-1920)
- Founded: 1903
- Last updated: 29 December 2017

Kelly Miller High School was a 'colored' or 'negro' high school in Clarksburg, West Virginia operated from 1903 until school desegregation in 1956. The school was named in honor of Kelly Miller, an African American mathematician, sociologist, essayist, newspaper columnist, author, and an important figure in the intellectual life of black America for close to half a century. At the time, Miller was Howard University Dean of the college of Arts and Sciences, and traveled to Clarksburg to discuss education as a way to help African Americans. The black community of Clarksburg decided to change the name of the school that same year, 1920, from Water Street 'colored' School to Kelly Miller 'colored' School. The school colors were black and orange, and the team was the Kelly Miller Yellow Jackets. The school's building has been the location of the central offices for the Harrison County Board of Education since 1982. The future of this building is in limbo as the board offices are planning to move to the former Gore Middle School which is a newer recently closed structure.

== Location ==
Kelly Miller High School is located on EB Saunders Way, in Clarksburg, West Virginia. It is still standing today and previously served as the main office for the Harrison County School Board. It is currently owned and being updated into a community center by the West Virginia Black Heritage Festival. The builder, Charles D. Ogden, was a Harrison County resident. He completed the building in 1902. Like many black schools throughout the state, Kelly Miller existed not just for the students. Prior to integration, the school was a focal point of the Clarksburg black community. It served as a rallying point, a social center and an institution with which the black community could identify. In 1929 the building was expanded to include a gymnasium, swimming pool, large library, more classrooms manual arts workshop, an auditorium with a seating capacity of 825 and a first-class home economics department.

== Kelly Miller ==
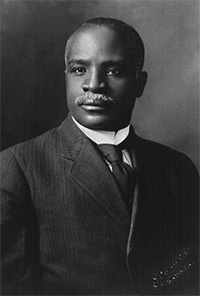
Kelly Miller

Miller was born in Winnsboro, South Carolina in 1863, and graduated from Howard University in 1886. He was the first black admitted to Johns Hopkins University when he began his graduate studies in mathematics, physics, and astronomy. Appointed professor of mathematics at Howard in 1890, Miller introduced sociology into the curriculum in 1895, serving as professor of sociology from 1895 to 1934. As dean of the College of Arts and Sciences, he modernized the classical curriculum, strengthening the natural and social sciences. Miller graduated from Howard's School of Law in 1903.

Miller was a prolific writer of articles and essays which were published in major newspapers and magazines and several books including Out of the House of Bondage. Miller assisted W. E. B. Du Bois in editing The Crisis, the official journal of the National Association for the Advancement of Colored People (NAACP). In the 1920s and 1930s, his weekly column appeared in more than 100 newspapers.

On African American educational policy, Miller aligned himself with neither the "radicals" — Du Bois and the Niagara Movement — nor the "conservatives" — the followers of Booker T. Washington. Miller sought a middle way, a comprehensive education system that would provide for "symmetrical development" of African American citizens by offering both vocational and intellectual instruction.

Miller was a member of Alpha Phi Alpha fraternity.

== Notable staff ==
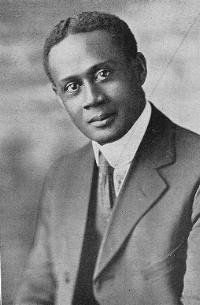
Duncan Huey Kyle

Duncan Huey Kyle Was the principal when the school opened he was a well known African American. Around this period the state of Alabama trained and sent out to adjacent states a number of African American men and women to places among the leaders of the race in the educational, religious, and business life. Kyle was among these. His start date at Kelly Miller is unknown but he left Kelly Miller in 1919.

EB Saunders served as the school's principal from 1919 to 1956 when the school closed. Principal Saunders was placed as principal at Linden Grade School after the school closed. The portion of Water Street where the building is located from Washington Ave to the Dead end was renamed EB Saunders Way sometime in the 1990s in honor of the former beloved principal.
