= West Virginia State Yellow Jackets football =

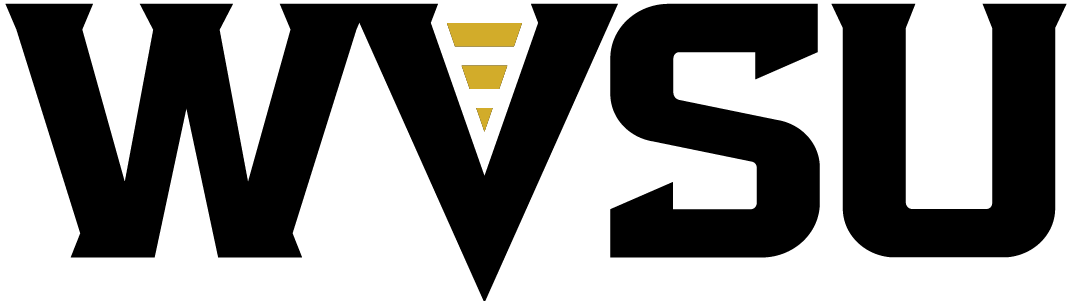
- First season: 1921; 105 years ago
- Athletic director: David Hicks
- Head coach: John Pennington; 10th season, 49–42 (.538)
- Location: Institute, West Virginia
- Stadium: Dickerson Stadium (capacity: 5,000)
- Field: Lakin-Ray Field
- NCAA division: Division II
- Conference: MEC
- Colors: Old gold and black
- All-time record: 362–512–34 (.417)
- Bowl record: 0–1 (.000)

Black college national championships
- 1922, 1936

Conference championships
- 1936, 1948, 1951, 1968

Division championships
- 1979
- Consensus All-Americans: 1
- Rivalries: Charleston (WV); Kentucky State; Central State
- Mascot: Stinger
- Outfitter: Nike
- Website: wvsuyellowjackets.com

The West Virginia State Yellow Jackets football program represents West Virginia State University in college football at the NCAA Division II level in the Mountain East Conference. West Virginia State began competing in intercollegiate football in 1921.

== History ==
=== Conference memberships ===
- 1921-1925: Independent
- 1926-1941: Midwest Athletic Association (MWAA)
- 1942-1955: Colored Intercollegiate Athletic Association (CIAA)
- 1956-2012: West Virginia Intercollegiate Athletic Conference (WVIAC)
- 2013-present: Mountain East Conference (MEC)

=== Undefeated seasons ===
West Virginia State University has recorded three undefeated seasons in its football program’s history, including seasons in which the team finished with one or more ties.

Season	Coach	Record	Conference
1922	Adolph Hamblin	3–0–1	Independent
1936	Adolph Hamblin	7–0–1	MWAA
1949	Mark Cardwell	8–0–1	CIAA

== Seasons ==
Legend

^{†} National champion
^{‡} Conference champion
^{#} Division champion
^ Bowl game berth
* Playoff berth

Season	Head Coach	Conference results				Season results			Postseason	Final ranking
Season	Head Coach	Finish	Wins	Losses	Ties	Wins	Losses	Ties		Final ranking
West Virginia State Yellow Jackets football seasons
Colored Intercollegiate Athletic Association (CIAA)
1930	Adolph Hamblin					3	3	1	—	—
1931	Adolph Hamblin					4	3		—	—
1932	Adolph Hamblin					2	5	2	—	—
1933	Adolph Hamblin					4	5		—	—
1934	Adolph Hamblin					6	3	1	—	—
1935	Adolph Hamblin					6	3		—	—
1936	Adolph Hamblin	1st	3	0	1	7	0	1	Black College National Champions	—
1937	Adolph Hamblin	5th	2	3		3	3	1	—	—
1938	Adolph Hamblin	4th	2	2	1	3	4	1	—	—
1939	Adolph Hamblin	4th	2	2		2	3	1	—	—
1940	Adolph Hamblin		1	4		2	5	1	—	—
1941	Adolph Hamblin		2	2	1	3	4	1	—	—
1942	Adolph Hamblin	10th	2	2		6	2		—	—
1943	Adolph Hamblin	6th	0	2		0	2		—	—
1944	Adolph Hamblin	8th	0	2	1	1	4	1	—	—
1945	Mark Cardwell	2nd	4	0	2	5	1	2	—	—
1946	Mark Cardwell	T–2nd	5	2		6	3	1	L, 7–27 vs. Tennessee A&I; Derby Bowl	10
1947	Mark Cardwell	6th	4	1	1	6	3	1	—	14
1948^{‡}	Mark Cardwell	1st	5	1		5	2	2	CIAA Champions	4
1949	Mark Cardwell	2nd	5	0	1	8	0	1	—	2
1950	Mark Cardwell	4th	3	2	1	5	3	1	—	11
1951^{‡}	Mark Cardwell	1st	5	0	1	6	2	1	CIAA Champions	8
1952	Mark Cardwell	T–4th	4	2		4	4	1	—	—
1953	Mark Cardwell	T–4th	4	2		6	3		—	11
1954	Mark Cardwell	T–14th	1	5		3	6		—	—
1955	Mark Cardwell	17th	0	6		1	7		—	—
West Virginia Intercollegiate Athletic Conference (WVIAC)	Mark Cardwell									
1956	Mark Cardwell	N/Q	1	0		4	3		—	—
1957	Mark Cardwell	3rd	2	1	1	2	4	2	—	—
1958	Mark Cardwell	5th	2	1	1	3	4	1	—	—
1959	Unknown	8th	2	2		2	4	1	—	—
1960	Chester Burris	11th	0	4		1	6		—	—
1961	Chester Burris	4th (Eastern)	0	4		0	7		—	—
1962	Chester Burris	4th (Eastern)	0	5		0	7		—	—
1963	Paul Talbott	3rd (Eastern)	3	3		4	4		—	—
1964	Paul Talbott	10th	1	4	1	2	5	1	—	—
1965	Paul Talbott	9th	1	4	1	1	6	1	—	—
1966	Richard Tredway	9th	1	6		2	7		—	—
1967	Richard Tredway	8th	1	5		2	6		—	—
1968^{‡}	Colin Cameron	1st	5	1		8	1		WVIAC Champions	—
1969	Colin Cameron	4th	4	3		6	4		—	—
1970	Colin Cameron	4th	4	3		4	5		—	—
1971	Colin Cameron	7th	2	5		2	8		—	—
1972	Colin Cameron	6th	4	3		4	6		—	—
1973	Colin Cameron	3rd (Southern)	2	2		5	5		—	—
1974	Colin Cameron	5th (Southern)	0	4		1	8		—	—
1975	Colin Cameron	T–2nd (Southern)	2	2		3	6	1	—	—
1976	Colin Cameron	T–2nd (Southern)	2	2		4	4	1	—	—
1977	Oree Banks	3rd (Southern)	2	2		2	8		—	—
1978	Oree Banks	T–2nd (Southern)	6	3		6	4		—	—
1979 ^{#}	Oree Banks	1st (Southern)	6	3		6	5		L, 13-14 vs. Fairmont St; WVIAC Championship Game	—
1980	Oree Banks	2nd (Southern)	6	3		6	4		—	—
1981	Oree Banks	T–6th	2	5	1	3	5	1	—	—
1982	Oree Banks	4th	5	3		6	3	1	—	—
1983	Oree Banks	T–7th	2	6		3	7		—	—
1984	Clifton Moore	6th	3	4	1	4	5	1	—	—
1985	Clifton Moore	8th	0	7		2	8		—	—
1986	Clifton Moore	T–5th	2	5		3	7		—	—
1987	Clifton Moore	8th	0	7	0	0	11	0	—	—
1988	Clifton Moore	4th	3	3	1	4	5	1	—	—
1989	Clifton Moore	T–3rd	3	3		3	7		—	—
1990	Bob Gobel	4th	3	3		4	6		—	—
1991	Bob Gobel	3rd	4	3		6	4		—	19
1992	Scott Tinsley	4th	4	3		6	4		—	17
1993	Scott Tinsley	7th	1	6		1	9		—	—
1994	Scott Tinsley	8th	2	5		4	6		—	—
1995	Eric Gates	7th	1	6		1	9		—	—
1996	Carl Lee	4th	3	4		4	7		—	—
1997	Carl Lee	T–4th	3	4		5	6		—	—
1998	Carl Lee	7th	2	5		3	8		—	—
1999	Carl Lee	T–4th	2	4		5	5		—	—
2000	Carl Lee	T–4th	3	4		4	7		—	—
2001	Carl Lee	7th	2	5		4	7		—	—
2002	Carl Lee	8th	0	7		1	10		—	—
2003	Carl Lee	T–4th	3	4		3	8		—	—
2004	Carl Lee	T–6th	2	5		3	8		—	—
2005	Carl Lee	T–7th	2	6		2	9		—	—
2006	Earl Monroe	7th	2	5		5	6		—	—
2007	Earl Monroe	T–4th	5	3		7	3		—	—
2008	Earl Monroe	T–4th	5	3		7	3		—	—
2009	Earl Monroe	T–7th	2	6		3	7		—	—
2010	Earl Monroe	9th	0	8		0	10		—	—
2011	Earl Monroe	T–7th	1	7		1	9		—	—
2012	Earl Monroe	8th	1	7		2	9		—	—
Mountain East Conference (MEC)
2013	Jon Anderson	11th	0	10		0	11		—	—
2014	Jon Anderson	11th	1	9		2	9		—	—
2015	Jon Anderson	8th	5	5		5	6		—	—
2016	Jon Anderson	9th	3	7		3	8		—	—
2017	John Pennington	4th	5	5		6	5		—	—
2018	John Pennington	5th	5	5		6	5		—	—
2019	John Pennington	2nd	7	3		7	4		—	—
2020	John Pennington	4th (South)	2	2		2	2		—	—
2021	John Pennington	4th	6	4		6	5		—	—
2022	John Pennington	4th	6	4		7	4		—	—
2023	John Pennington	7th	4	5		4	6		—	—
2024	John Pennington	5th	4	4		6	5		—	—
2025	John Pennington	5th	5	4		5	6		—	—
2026	John Pennington								—	—
Total			226	320	14	360	507	34		
♦ Denotes a tie for first place and conference co-champion

== Championships ==
=== Conference championships ===
West Virginia State has won four conference championships in its program history: one as a member of the Midwest Athletic Association, two as a member of the Central Intercollegiate Athletic Association, and one as a member of the West Virginia Intercollegiate Athletic Conference.

Season	Coach	Conf. Record	Conference
1936	Adolph Hamblin	3–0–1	MWAA
1948	Mark Cardwell	5–1–0	CIAA
1951	Mark Cardwell	5–0–1	CIAA
1968	Colin Cameron	5–1–0	WVIAC

=== Black college national championships ===
Season	Coach	Selectors	Record
1922	Adolph Hamblin	CAAC	3–0–1
1936	Adolph Hamblin	PC	7–0–1
Black college national championships			2

== See also ==
- West Virginia State Yellow Jackets
