= Bluefield State University =

Historically black university in Bluefield, West Virginia, US

- Former names: Bluefield Colored Institute (1895–1932); Bluefield State Teachers College (1932–1943); Bluefield State College (1943–2022)
- Motto: "Accept The Challenge"
- Type: Public historically black university
- Established: February 28, 1895; 131 years ago
- Accreditation: HLC
- Academic affiliations: TMCF; WVHEPC
- Endowment: $4.32 million (2021)
- President: Darrin Martin
- Students: 1,301
- Location: Bluefield, West Virginia, United States; 37°15′54″N 81°14′24″W
- Campus: 50 acres (0.20 km^{2}); Distant town
- Other campuses: Beckley
- Colors: Blue and gold
- Nickname: Big Blue
- Sporting affiliations: NCAA Division II – CIAA; Conference Carolinas
- Mascot: Sir Blue
- Website: bluefieldstate.edu
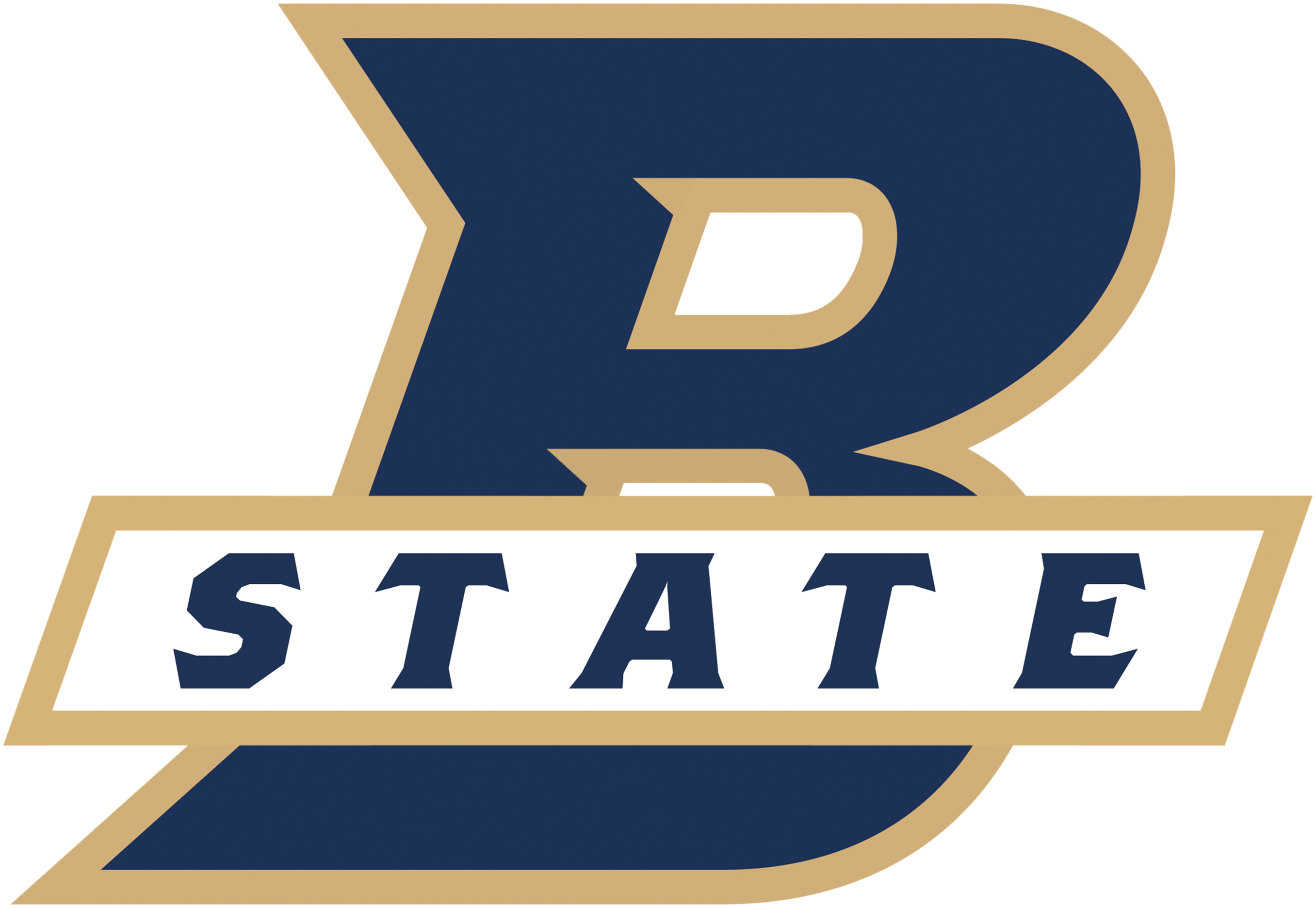

Bluefield State University is a public historically black university (HBCU) in Bluefield, West Virginia, United States. The university is a member-school of the Thurgood Marshall College Fund but is now a predominantly white institution (PWI).

== History ==
Bluefield Colored Institute was founded in 1895 as a "high-graded school" for African Americans. At that time, the West Virginia Constitution prohibited integrated public education. Bluefield was within 100 miles of 70 percent of the state's African American residents. The school was located on a steep four-acre (0.016 km^{2}) site to the north side of the Norfolk & Western Railway tracks.

Principal Hamilton Hatter supervised the first class of 40 pupils. Nathan Cook Brackett, an abolitionist and first president of Storer College, served as president of the board of regents. Hatter oversaw the construction of Mahood Hall, the administrative building, as well as dormitories Lewis Hall and West Hall. Mahood Hall was named for State Senator William Mahood, a Republican who represented Mercer County, author of the institute's sponsoring legislation.

In 1906, Hatter was succeeded by Robert P. Sims, who would lead the institute, then college, for three decades. In 1909, the institute became a normal school, adding the training of teachers to its curriculum. By 1920, enrollment climbed to 235, with summer sessions for teacher certification adding hundreds more. Campus growth followed enrollment gains, expanding to 23 acres and the addition of Payne and Conley Halls. Enrollment grew to more than six hundred on its "terraced hills."

The President's House, later renamed Hatter Hall, was built in 1930 and added to the National Register of Historic Places.

In 1932, the State of West Virginia recognized the institute's success, accredited its education curriculum, and changed its name to Bluefield State Teachers College.

Sims' successor, Henry Dickason, was an institute alumnus and president from 1936 to 1952. In 1943, the state again accredited an expanded curriculum and renamed the school Bluefield State College.

Neither the city nor the college were isolated from the demonstrations and demands for civil rights that dominated much of the 1960s. African American students protested that the school administration was working actively to transform Bluefield State from a historically black residential college to a commuter college with predominantly white students. Tension persisted, and on November 21, 1968, a bomb exploded in the gymnasium. No one was injured, but the damage was extensive. A $5,000 reward was offered by Governor Hulett C. Smith, and college president Wendell Hardway responded by closing all dormitories immediately and permanently. Students returning from Thanksgiving break found themselves locked out. The actions accelerated the college's transition to a majority white student body.

Despite these changes, overall enrollment remained strong through the succeeding decades. In 2003, the West Virginia Legislature created a community college system offering two-year degrees at new institutions across the state. Among them was New River Community and Technical College. Bluefield State was required to transfer all its two-year programs, except engineering and nursing, to New River. This resulted in losing approximately half of the college's enrollment. The succeeding years were of slow decline, with occasional calls from state legislators to merge the college with nearby Concord University.

In 2019, the board of trustees hired former West Liberty University president Robin Capehart as interim president. Later that year, Capehart and Governor Jim Justice announced the return to a residential campus with the groundbreaking for the first residence hall since the 1960s.

In 2020, Bluefield State acquired the former Bluefield Regional Medical Center property, adding 68 acres to the campus and naming the student facility the Medical Education Center Residence Hall. Former patient rooms were converted to residences; a cafeteria and lounge areas were built in time for the 2021–22 school year. Enrollment continued to grow during that time. Bluefield State leased back emergency department facilities to the Princeton Community Hospital, owners of the Bluefield Regional Medical Center.

In 2022, the state's Higher Education Planning Commission approved the college's first master's degree program, a Master of Business Administration, and renamed the institution Bluefield State University.

The university garnered national attention in 2022 after the university suspended the faculty senate and created a new review system for tenured faculty members; this was quickly followed by a vote of no confidence by the university's faculty. This prompted an investigation by the university's accreditor, the Higher Learning Commission (HLC), in September 2023. The commission's peer review team reported that the president and board of governors "do not operate with integrity in several academic and human resources functions," including accusations that the university president hired several faculty members without input from university faculty, that the president fired a staff member following their meeting with the peer review team, and that the university's governing board were "not making decisions in the best interest of the university". President Capehart resigned shortly after the report was delivered to the university. The HLC peer review team also recommended that the commission require the university to provide additional information to justify their accreditation.

== Academics ==
The university is organized into six colleges/schools:

- College of Arts and Sciences
- W. Paul Cole Jr. School of Business
- College of Engineering Technology
- College of Health Sciences
- School of Criminal Justice
- School of Education

2022 student body racial composition
Category	Percent
White	75.9%
Black	20.1%
Hispanic	2.1%
*Other	1.1%
Non-Resident Immigrant	0.7%

*Note: This racial-ethnic group includes Asian, Native American or Alaska Native, Native Hawaiian or Other Pacific Islander, and other racial or ethnic categories not explicitly listed in the table.

As of the 2022–2023 school year, the student body is 59.3% female and 40.6% male.

== Student life ==
Undergraduate demographics as of Fall 2023
Race and ethnicity	Total
White	72%
Black	17%
Two or more races	5%
Hispanic	4%
Unknown	1%
Economic diversity
Low-income (Note: The percentage of students who received an income-based federal Pell grant intended for low-income students.)	44%
Affluent (Note: The percentage of students who are a part of the American middle class at the bare minimum.)	56%

Bluefield State became a residential university in 2021 for the first time since 1968.

=== Athletics ===
Bluefield State athletic teams are the Big Blue. There are 21 intercollegiate varsity sports and many intramural sports.

Bluefield State belongs to the National Collegiate Athletic Association (NCAA) at the NCAA Division II level, primarily competing in the Central Intercollegiate Athletic Association (CIAA) since the 2023–24 academic year; its men's wrestling team is an affiliate of Conference Carolinas. Prior to this, Bluefield State competed as a D-II independent as well as an Independent in the United States Collegiate Athletic Association (USCAA) from 2013–14 to 2022–23, and as a member of the now defunct West Virginia Intercollegiate Athletic Conference (WVIAC) from 1955–56 to 2012–13.

In 2020, President Capehart announced the return of football to the athletics program for the first time since 1980. Eleven new sports were added as well.

==== History ====
Sports have a prominent place in Bluefield State's past and recent history. Teams competed in the Colored Intercollegiate Athletic Association—now the Central Intercollegiate Athletic Association (CIAA)—from 1932 to 1955. In 1955, the college joined the West Virginia Intercollegiate Athletic Conference (WVIAC) and remained there until its dissolution in 2013. It competed as an Independent until 2023 when it was re-admitted into the CIAA.

The archives of the WVIAC are housed at Bluefield State's Jefferson Library.

In 1927 and 1928, football teams (then the "Blue Devils") won Negro College Athletic Association national championships as announced by the Pittsburgh Courier. In 2020, football began its return to campus with the hiring of head coach Tony Coaxum. In 2021, the team played its first games in 41 years and finished the season with a 4–3 record. In 2022, the team played its second season as an independent and finished 4–4. In 2023, the Big Blue competed in the CIAA for the first time in 70 years against other historically black colleges and universities.

Men and women's basketball teams competed in the West Virginia Intercollegiate Athletic Conference (WVIAC) from 1955 until its dissolution in 2013. The men's teams were tournament finalists in 1987 and 1988. The women's teams won conference titles in 1985, 1987, 1990 and 1993. Additionally, they won tournament titles in 1985 and 1993 and were finalists in 1986, 1989, 1992 and 1994.

The men's golf team won a WVIAC championship in 2011. In 2021, it won the USCAA national championship.

The men's tennis team won a WVIAC championship in 2012. It won an NCAA Regional championship in 2021 and competed in the Division II Finals for the first time.

The women's volleyball team won the USCAA championship in 2022.

The men's and women's track & field teams both won the USCAA championship in 2023.
