= Napoleon Jones-Henderson =

American weaver and multimedia artist (1943–2025)

- Born: November 23, 1943; Chicago, Illinois, U.S.
- Died: December 6, 2025 (aged 82); Boston, Massachusetts, U.S.
- Education: Sorbonne Student Continuum-Student and Artists Center; School of the Art Institute of Chicago (BFA); Northern Illinois University; Maryland Institute College of Art (MA)
- Known for: AfriCOBRA, founding member
- Notable work: "TCB" (1970), woven tapestry
- Movement: Black Arts Movement
- Awards: Merit of Honor Award, Walters Art Museum; Award for Outstanding Recognition, Museum of Science and Industry; Award of Excellence, National Conference of Artists

Napoleon Jones-Henderson (born Napoleon Henderson, November 23, 1943 – December 6, 2025) was an American weaver and multimedia artist most known for his role in AfriCOBRA, an artist collective established in Chicago, Illinois, in 1968. Jones-Henderson joined AfriCOBRA in 1969, a year after its founding.

== Life and education ==
Napoleon Jones-Henderson was born on November 23, 1943, in Chicago, Illinois, where he later attended George Washington Carver High School. In 1963, he was awarded a scholarship to study at the Sorbonne Student Continuum-Student and Artists Center in Paris, France.

Jones-Henderson returned to Chicago that year, and went on to earn his BFA from the School of the Art Institute of Chicago in 1971. It was also during this period that Jones-Henderson studied weaving under Mahboob Shahzaman at Northern Illinois University. He left Chicago for Boston, Massachusetts, in 1974.

In 2005, looking to expand the materials of his practice, Jones-Henderson earned his MFA from the Maryland Institute College of Art. He worked and resided in Roxbury, Massachusetts.

== Career and AfriCOBRA ==
In 1969, Jones-Henderson joined AfriCOBRA, while earning his BFA at the School of the Art Institute of Chicago. Reflecting on the impetus of AfriCOBRA, Jones-Henderson writes, "we began to agitate for the concept of a new aesthetic, a new sense of purpose, a new reason for making "art": no, not "art" but "IMAGES": positive images of Black pride. Black self-determination, weapon images in/for the struggle to heal the minds and Souls of Black Folk throughout the Diaspora." Producing large-scale textiles indicative of AfriCOBRA's aesthetic principles, he worked and exhibited alongside Barbara Jones-Hogu, Jeff Donaldson, Wadsworth Jarrell, Jae Jarrell, Gerald Williams, Nelson Stevens, and others as the collective continued to grow in membership through the following decades.

After moving to Boston in the mid-1970s, Jones-Henderson became the executive director of the Research Institute of African and African Diaspora Arts, Inc., and has held several academic appointments at colleges across the east coast, including the Massachusetts College of Art and Design and Emerson College.

== Death ==
Jones-Henderson died in Boston on December 6, 2025, at the age of 82 from cancer.
