= Kavi Gupta =

Coordinates: 41°52′58.3″N 87°38′56.2″W

- Established: 2000
- Location: Various
- Type: Contemporary art gallery
- Accreditation: Art Dealers Association of America (ADAA)
- Owner: Kavi Gupta
- Website: http://kavigupta.com

Kavi Gupta is a contemporary art gallery owned by gallerist Kavi Gupta. Headquartered in the West Loop neighborhood of Chicago, the gallery operates multiple exhibition spaces as well as Kavi Gupta Editions, a publishing imprint and bookstore.

Kavi Gupta opened in Chicago in 2000. The gallery expanded to a second space in the Tempelhof-Schöneberg borough of Berlin in 2008. In September 2013 the gallery expanded to a third space in Chicago. The new space opened with an installation exhibition by Roxy Paine titled Apparatus.

Artists currently represented by Kavi Gupta include AFRICOBRA co-founders Gerald Williams and Wadsworth Jarrell, who were featured in the exhibition Nation Time at the 2019 Venice Biennale; Guggenheim Fellow Tony Tasset, who was in the 2014 Whitney Biennial; sculptor Richard Hunt; Roxy Paine, who was part of the 2002 Whitney Biennial in New York; the estate of Chicago Imagist painter Roger Brown; José Lerma; Jessica Stockholder; James Little; who was in the 2022 Whitney Biennial; Tomokazu Matsuyama and Mickalene Thomas.

Kavi Gupta is active at art fairs, including Art Basel in Miami Beach and in Hong Kong, The Armory Show in New York, EXPO Chicago, Art Chicago, Frieze Art Fair in New York and London, Frieze Masters, and Felix LA.

== Publishing ==
In 2014, Kavi Gupta opened Kavi Gupta Editions, an art bookstore and publishing imprint. Its publications include books about artists Alfred Conteh, Clare Rojas, Glenn Kaino, José Lerma, and Jessica Stockholder. Additionally, Kavi Gupta publishes an Index Series, which is a collection of pocket-sized catalogues, each one highlighting the practice of a contemporary artist through illustrations of their works and exhibitions. The series includes over forty titles by artists from the gallery's program.
