= Barbara Jones-Hogu =

American artist (1938–2017)

- Born: April 17, 1938; Chicago, Illinois, United States
- Died: November 14, 2017 (aged 79); Chicago Heights, Illinois, United States
- Education: Howard University(BA); School of the Art Institute of Chicago(BFA); Institute of Design(MFA); Illinois Institute of Technology(MA); Governors State University(MFA)
- Known for: AfriCOBRA, co-founder Painting
- Notable work: "Unite" (1969,1971)
- Movement: Black Arts Movement
- Children: Kuumba Hogu

Barbara Jones-Hogu (April 17, 1938 – November 14, 2017) was an African-American artist best known for her work with the Organization of Black American Culture (OBAC) and for co-founding the artists' collective AfriCOBRA.

== Early life and education ==
Barbara Jones-Hogu was born in Chicago, Illinois, in 1938. She received a Bachelor of Arts degree from Howard University and a Bachelor of Fine Arts degree from the School of the Art Institute of Chicago. She earned a Master of Fine Arts degree from the Institute of Design in Chicago, as well as a master's degree in printing from the Illinois Institute of Technology, Chicago. She later pursued a Master of Fine Arts in Independent Film and Digital Imaging at Governors State University while in her early seventies. She wished to earn the degree to document artists and their work.

She was described as very private and thoughtful. She had one son, Kuumba Hogu, who has remarked that he wanted his mother to be remembered through her artwork.

== Career ==
Jones-Hogu was a member of the Organization of Black American Culture (OBAC), and contributed when they completed the mural Wall of Respect in 1967. It is regarded as the first collective street mural in the United States. She completed the actors' section. Jones-Hogu became involved in printing while studying at The Art Institute of Chicago. Her major in Painting included courses in printmaking, and she discovered that she enjoyed it while taking the coursework for her major. She was working while going to school. She also was able to use printmaking facilities at the Institute of Design. Misch Kohn, the head of printmaking at the time, gave her a key to the printmaking facilities so that she could complete printmaking work there whenever she wanted, usually on evenings and weekends.

In 1968, Jones-Hogu co-founded AfriCOBRA, a collective of African-American artists based in Chicago. One of her most famous works while involved with the group was "Unite", which has been featured in many exhibitions, including at the Tate Modern in London. The work was inspired by a sculpture by Elizabeth Catlett, which she saw while visiting Catlett in Mexico in the summer of 1968. It was also inspired by the 1968 Olympics Black Power salute. She later remarked: " I thought we, as a people should unite as a people under this concept." The prints of "Unite" that she made prior to joining AfriCOBRA were differentiated from the prints she made while in AfriCOBRA by an African sculpture — the prints that she had done previously did not have an African sculpture, and instead had an African head. She created the work "Resist Law and Order in a Sick Society" due to these events. Many of her works incorporate key phrases as titles.

Jones-Hogu also created a work entitled "Stop Genocide." The work was based on gangs, which she thought could be used as a force for good if they came together. However, she felt that the gangs were engaging in "self-genocide" instead of aiming to stop genocide, which she defined as "[w]hite on black genocide and crime." She printed this work on Japanese handmade paper, instead of her usual paper that she used for AfriCOBRA prints. The latter paper started to become fragile over the years, prompting her to switch. She printed at the Illinois Institute of Technology, as she did not have a studio at the time. She produced many works with the flag for her thesis at the Illinois Institute of Technology. During this time, she also was filmed for a portion of the documentary Medium Cool, but her parts were not used. Jones-Hogu said that makers of the documentary wished to ask young "radical" African-Americans about the potential turmoil in Chicago during the 1968 Democratic National Convention. She remembered that she spoke on "the racial and the political attitudes and conditions in the city".

She appeared in a 2011 documentary entitled AfriCOBRA: Art For The People, in which she remarked: "The people we were making art for looked like us." The "Unite" print consists of two versions - one was created prior to her co-forming the group in 1969, and another version was created in 1971 after she became a member. Prior to becoming involved with AfriCOBRA, she remarked that her works were informed by a largely negative narrative in the context of racial politics. However, after becoming involved with AfriCOBRA, her individual work shifted and took on a more positive, hopeful narrative. One example is her 1971 screenprint Relate to Your Heritage, which borrows the aesthetics of blacklight and blaxploitation posters but, inverting their typically abusive or trivializing content, depicts black women in royal garb. She wished to display more positive issues in her politics, and this was a philosophy also echoed by AfriCOBRA.

Around 1973, Jones-Hogu shifted from primarily painting to drawing, and to a lesser degree printmaking, as her son would become ill from paint fumes. She used oil-based inks. She had her first solo show involving her prints and drawings. The show was held by a gallery owned by African-American artists. Jones-Hogu started to prepare prints for other artists' work in AfriCOBRA. She felt that her printmaking abilities set her apart, as many artists in AfriCOBRA were painters. Every time she completed a print, she would always put "artist's proof" on it. She started to do block printing and intaglio, and later moved on to making silkscreen prints once she opened her own shop. She did lithographs for fundraising, and Sammy Davis Jr. reportedly bought one.

She briefly served on the board of the South Side Community Art Center, and was heavily involved with it throughout her life. The South Side Community Center was also where her work was first exhibited in the early 1970s, and it went on to feature more exhibits of her work. Jones-Hogu later remarked in an interview that she was told that people had complained about the number of times her work was exhibited at the center, which ended her run of exhibitions there. She did not have a one-person show at the center, but exhibited with artists such as Napoleon Jones-Henderson. Later, she donated many of her prints to the center. Many of her prints had been lost due to flooding, as she stored them in her basement. Jones-Hogu started do much work with pastels and colored pencils starting in the late 1970s and the early 1980s. She began to create many portraits. She created a portrait of Lurlean Dean that Lurlean's son displayed at Lurlean's memorial service.

An exhibition of the work of afriCOBRA describes Jones-Hogu's individual art style as "fus[ing] political messages, images, and text." Jones-Hogu's work is displayed in many museums, including the Art Institute of Chicago, The Brooklyn Museum, the National Civil Rights Museum, and the National Museum of African American History and Culture. Her work has appeared in books, including Creating Their Own Image: The History of African American Women Artists, The Black Arts Movement: Literary Nationalism in the 1960s and 1970s, and Toward a People's Art: The Contemporary Mural Movement. She was represented from 2005 on by her art dealer, David Lusenhop of Lusenhop Fine Art, after she met him at an exhibition in which her work was displayed in 2004. She reportedly walked up to him and asked him why she had not received an invitation to the show, as her work was being displayed in it. She and Lusenhop became friends. Lusenhop Fine Art, of Cleveland, Ohio, represents the Estate of Barbara Jones-Hogu.

Her first solo museum exhibition took place at the DePaul Art Museum in Chicago in 2018. It was entitled Barbara Jones-Hogu: Resist, Relate, Unite 1968–1975. Others were not aware of how much work she had produced until the latest years of her life, when she was moved to a nursing home. Jones-Hogu reportedly told others that she did not produce much work, but many projects of hers were found, and thus they were collected into an exhibition. A catalog for the exhibition was funded by the Terra Foundation for American Art, and will be Jones-Hogu's first monograph.

== Works of Barbara Jones-Hogu ==
Jones-Hogu's work is numerous in numbers, distribution and location. There is an abundance of work by Jones-Hogu that stems from both her importance and influence in AfriCOBRA's movement as well as her own independent work, which extends from the 1960s and '70s up to recent years and her death in 2017. Exhibitions in which her work featured include Soul of a Nation: Art in the Age of Black Power exhibition, AfriCOBRA Nation Time, AfriCOBRA Messages to the People, We Wanted A Revolution: Black Radical Women, 1965-85, and many more.

=== Works (partial) ===
- Getting the Game Together, 1967, woodcut on paper
- Man's Return, 1967, woodcut on paper
- Untitled Woodcut, 1967, pine wood
- Be Your Brother's Keeper, 1968, screenprint
- The Land Where My Father Died, 1968, screenprint
- America II, 1969, screenprint
- America III: While Some Are Trying To Get Whiter, 1969,
- Nation Time, 1969, screenprint
- One People Unite, 1969, color screenprint on gold paperboard
- Unite (First State), 1969, screenprint
- Untitled, 1969, screenprint
- Untitled, 1969, color screenprint on gold paperboard
- Heritage, 1970, screenprint, tusche and glue
- I'm Better Than These Motherfuckers, 1970, screenprint
- Stop Genocide, 1970, screenprint
- Unite, 1971, screenprint on wove paper
- Nation Time (II), 1971, screenprint
- High Priestess, 1971, screenprint on wove paper
- Rise and Take Control, 1971, screenprint
- Relate to Your Heritage, 1971, screenprint
- Black Men We Need You, 1971, color screenprint
- To Be Free (TCB), 1971, screenprint
- To Be Free (Know the Past, Prepare for the Future), 1971, screenprint
- When Styling, 1973, screenprint
- God's Child, 2009, screenprint

== See also ==
- AfriCOBRA
- Jae Jarrell
- Jeff Donaldson
- Wadsworth Jarrell
- Gerald Williams
