= Hand Colored Flowers =

1974 portfolio of screen prints by Andy Warhol

- Flowers (Hand-Colored)
- Artist: Andy Warhol
- Year: 1974
- Medium: Screenprint, printed in black ink, from one stencil, hand-colored in Dr. Martin's aniline watercolor dyes
- Movement: Pop Art

Hand Colored Flowers, also known as Flowers (Hand-Colored), is a 1974 portfolio of screen prints by the American artist Andy Warhol. Co-published by Multiples, Inc. and Castelli Graphics, the series comprises ten floral compositions, each measuring 41 × 27 inches. The prints were silkscreened in black and hand-colored in watercolor by Warhol, then signed and numbered in an edition of 250.

The portfolio extends Warhol’s sustained engagement with the flower motif, first introduced with his Flowers series in 1964. In 1975, he also produced a related group of eight black-and-white flower drawings. The simplified forms and bold graphic treatment reflect Warhol’s broader exploration of repetition, flatness, and the elevation of mass-media imagery into the realm of fine art.

== Background ==
Flowers had been a recurring subject in Warhol's work since the mid-1960s. The original Flowers images were derived from a photograph taken by Patricia Caulfield for the June 1964 issue of Modern Photography. Warhol cropped the source image—originally depicting several blossoms and "seven flowers, and 'revised' it by shifting one of the flowers"—to create tightly framed compositions of hibiscus blooms. He initially developed the image in 1964 in numerous paintings of varying sizes and later revisited the motif in drawings and print portfolios.

Warhol regarded flowers as a consistently marketable subject, particularly after October 1973, when collectors Robert and Ethel Scull sold one of his large flower paintings depicting two blossoms at auction for $135,000, reinforcing the commercial appeal of the motif.

In 1974, Warhol produced a portfolio of 10 hand-colored flower prints that was published in an edition of 250. "Now, I just do portraits and flowers. I suppose because nobody really thought I knew how to draw. Some people still think of me in terms of soup cans. And they still hate it. I'm trying to make up for it now by painting flowers," Warhol said at the time.

== Production and description ==
One of his assistants, Ronnie Cutrone, was assigned the task of locating picture sources for the project. Cutrone assembled several illustrated books on the art of flower arranging, from which Warhol selected images to serve as the basis for freehand drawings. These drawings were then photographically transferred to silkscreens.

In contrast to the 1970 Flowers screen prints, which present 10 variations of a single image, the 1974 Hand Colored Flowers portfolio comprises 10 distinct floral compositions. Whereas the earlier flowers appear flat and graphic, the later images introduce a greater sense of three-dimensionality. Blossoms and vases are set starkly against expansive white paper, emphasizing spatial contrast and isolation.

Most arrangements are understated, often featuring a single bloom in a vase, sometimes accompanied by leaves or elements of florist's paraphernalia, such as an angular piece of driftwood placed beside a sunflower. The compositions are based on photographic sources and focus on close-up views of blossoms, at times cropped so that the image extends to or beyond the edges of the sheet.

After the drawings were silkscreened in black, Warhol filled in the forms with color in a casual, painterly manner. As in many of his works from the 1950s, the prints were brushed with Dr. Martin's aniline watercolor dyes. Because they were individually hand-colored, the prints vary in hue and surface quality, making them among Warhol's most decorative works in the watercolor medium and introducing subtle differences within the edition.

== Flowers (1975) ==
In 1975, Warhol created 8 drawings from similar photographic sources. Warhol used the photograph as a point of departure, loosening the image by eliminating certain details and extrapolating others to achieve a deliberately interpretive effect. In some compositions, the entire floral arrangement occupies only the middle portion of the page; in others, the image is dramatically enlarged as to crop the flower. Leaves may appear merely outlined or rendered with greater detail, and shadows are sometimes abbreviated or omitted altogether. These works are characterized by succinct line and a concentrated elegance.

== Exhibitions ==
Hand Colored Flowers, a portfolio of 10 flower compositions silkscreened in black and hand-colored, debuted at the Leo Castelli Gallery and Multiples, Inc. in New York from December 1974 to January 1975.

The Flowers series, consisting of 8 drawings, was exhibited at the Locksley Shay Gallery in Minneapolis from September to October 1975.

In January 1975, Arthur Elrod Associates, an interior design firm based in Palm Springs, and the Jack Glenn Gallery of Corona del Mar staged an exhibition of contemporary art that included Warhol's Hand Colored Flowers.

From January to February 1975, Warhol's 10-part Flowers series was exhibited at Contemporary Royale in Vancouver alongside mixed-media works by Art Lucs. The exhibition also included a Warhol self-portrait on canvas in red, blue, and green, portraits of Mao, Liz Taylor, and Marilyn Monroe, and a print of a theatre ticket.

In the summer of 1975, three hand-colored Flowers from a suite of 10, were included in the exhibitor Prints of the Seventies at the High Museum of Art in Atlanta.

Five of Warhol's hand-colored serigraphs, Flowers IV were among 25 contemporary prints exhibited at the Mary Institute in St. Louis from November to December 1975.

The hand-colored Flowers prints were included in the show SoHo Comes to the Suburbs at the Clarkstown Town Hall in New City, New York, from November 1975 to January 1976.

In the spring of 1976, Hand Colored Flowers were available through the Nancy Singer Gallery in St. Louis.

In September 1976, the Warhol exhibition Hand-Colored Flowers opened at the Albert White Gallery in Toronto.

From May to August 2010, the Bruce Museum in Greenwich, Connecticut, presented Andy Warhol: Flowers, 1974 in the Bantle Lecture Gallery, featuring two portfolios of ten prints in black ink on paper, one of which was hand-colored with aniline watercolor dyes. Now part of the museum's permanent collection, the portfolios were donated by Greenwich collectors Dave and Reba Williams, longtime museum supporters, and Peter M. Brant, owner of Warhol's Interview magazine.

== Critical reception ==
Writing in The Province, Art Perry observed that Warhol's Flowers drawings had the "soft clarity and linear perfection of a David Hockney," while noting that although some of the "more fanciful flowers (a sunflower entwined with driftwood for example) are strikingly beautiful," others did not succeed because "the mass of white paper overcomes their fine lines and muted washes."

In The Atlanta Journal, Clyde Burnett noted that Warhol's Flowers pictures were "not done in a 'Pop Art' approach," describing them instead as simple, "very satisfying linear images" with a "sort of timelessness," and concluding that the works demonstrated Warhol was "a superb visual artist."

Philip A. Shreffler of the St. Louis Post-Dispatch wrote that Warhol's "hand-watercolored serigraphs, 'Flowers I-V,"' present well-composed, pastel images of vased flowers in which the flowers, stems, vases and even shadows are given the same delicate, pen-and-ink-like treatment suggesting organic unity as well as the tenuousness of a living thing and the fleeting quality of the moment of artistic creation."

Art critic James Purdie of The Globe and Mail described Warhol's hand-colored Flowers prints as "yet another artistic metamorphosis," calling the series "economical" and "masterfully designed," and writing that the works "positively glow with subtle watercolor." He added that the prints revealed "a serene and mature artist," praising Warhol as "a master of suggestion and restraint."

== Collections ==
The Hand Colored Flowers series can be found in major art institutions worldwide, including the Museum of Modern Art in New York, the Whitney Museum in New York, the Albany Museum of Art in Georgia, the Art Institute of Chicago in Illinois, the National Gallery of Australia in Canberra, and the Bruce Museum in Greenwich, Connecticut.

== Art market ==
In February 2002, the screen print Flowers (Hand Colored) (F. & S. II 119), sold for $2,350 at Christie's.

In November 2002, the set Flowers (Hand-Colored) (F. & S. II 110–119), all numbered 243/250, sold for $20,315 at Christie's.

In May 2006, the set Flowers (Hand-Colored) (F. & S. 110–119), all numbered 184/250, sold for $66,000 at Christie's.

In October 2007, the set Flowers (Hand-Colored) (F. & S. 110–19), each numbered 48/250, sold for $70,600 at Christie's.

In July 2009, the screen print Flowers (Hand-Colored) (F. & S. II.106), numbered 74/250, sold for $4,000 at Christie's.

In July 2011, 2 screen prints, Flowers (Black and White) (F. & S. II.101) and Flowers (Hand-Colored) (F. & S. II.114 & 116), sold for $6,875 at Christie's.

In October 2011, the set Flowers (F. & S. II.110-19), each numbered 190/250, sold for $43,750 at Christie's.

In May 2013, 8 prints from the set Flowers (Hand-Colored) (F. & S. II.110-113, 115–116, 118–119), all numbered 96/250, sold for $50,000 at Christie's.

In October 2019, 3 Flowers (Hand-colored) screen prints numbered 'AP 27/50', 'AP 33/50,' and 'AP 27/50' respectively sold for $20,000 at Christie's.
