= Soul of a Nation: Art in the Age of Black Power =

British and American historical African-American art exhibition

- Catalogue cover, featuring a painting by Barkley L. Hendricks
- Date: 12 July–22 October 2017
- Venue: Tate Modern, London
- Theme: African-American art; Black power movement
- Touring dates: 3 February–23 April 2018; 14 September 2018–3 February 2019; 23 March–1 September 2019; 9 November 2019–15 March 2020; 27 June–30 August 2020
- Touring venues: Crystal Bridges Museum of American Art, Bentonville, Arkansas; Brooklyn Museum, New York; The Broad, Los Angeles; De Young Museum, San Francisco; Museum of Fine Arts, Houston
- Curators: Mark Godfrey and Zoé Whitley

Soul of a Nation: Art in the Age of Black Power is the title of a touring art exhibition originating at the Tate Modern in London in 2017. The exhibition, primarily focused on the period between 1963 and 1983, examined a range of art made by African Americans during and in response to a number of major historical milestones in the United States for black people, including the waning of the civil rights movement after the signing of major new civil rights legislation in the 1960s, the rise and eventual decline of the black power movement in the 1960s and 1970s, and the beginning of the Reagan era in the early 1980s. Organized by the Tate in coordination with the Crystal Bridges Museum of American Art in Arkansas and the Brooklyn Museum in New York, the exhibition traveled to several American museums after premiering in London.

The exhibition was curated by Mark Godfrey and Zoé Whitley. A wide variety of critics positively reviewed the exhibition both upon its premiere in the U.K. and during its tour across the United States, although several writers and art historians critiqued aspects of the curation.

== Background and history ==
Curators Mark Godfrey and Zoé Whitley first began planning for Soul of a Nation after examining the Tate Modern's permanent collection for significant historical gaps, particularly works by historical black and African-American artists. Godfrey and Whitley told the Houston Chronicle that it may have been easier for them to plan and stage an exhibition of this size on this topic due to their distance from the subject matter as curators at a European institution. Godfrey said that their aim for the show was broader than previous similar exhibitions in the United States, many of which focused on a single city or region as opposed to a national view of art during the era.

The exhibition opened at the Tate Modern in London in July 2017. The show was co-organized with the Crystal Bridges Museum of American Art in Bentonville, Arkansas, and the Brooklyn Museum in New York.

After closing in the U.K., the exhibition traveled from 2018 to 2021 to the Brooklyn Museum, Crystal Bridges, The Broad in Los Angeles, the de Young Museum in San Francisco, and the Museum of Fine Arts, Houston.

== Artists and themes ==
Godfrey and Whitley included 150 artworks from more than 65 artists working between 1963 and 1983. The exhibition included art by Charles Alston, Emma Amos, Benny Andrews, Romare Bearden, Elizabeth Catlett, Dana Chandler, Ed Clark, Roy DeCarava, Emory Douglas, Melvin Edwards, Reginald Gammon, Sam Gilliam, David Hammons, Barkley L. Hendricks, Jae Jarrell, Wadsworth Jarrell, Carolyn Lawrence, Norman Lewis, Al Loving, Phillip Lindsay Mason, Senga Nengudi, Lorraine O'Grady, John Outterbridge, Howardena Pindell, Noah Purifoy, Faith Ringgold, Betye Saar, Jack Whitten, William T. Williams, and Hale Woodruff, among others, as well as works by the art collectives Spiral and AfriCOBRA.

The exhibition was divided into several thematic gallery rooms oriented around a single style, group, artist, or region. Thematic groupings in the show included rooms dedicated to: Spiral; AfriCOBRA; Betye Saar; Linda Goode Bryant's Just Above Midtown gallery; abstract art on the east coast; assemblage-based art in Los Angeles; art made in service of the black power movement; art in public and non-gallery spaces; and a room dedicated to black and African-American cultural or political heroes.

== Publications and album ==
Tate published a catalogue of the exhibition, co-edited by Godfrey and Whitley, which featured a number of essays about art by African Americans during the period. Godfrey and writer Allie Biswas also co-edited The Soul of a Nation Reader, a volume of writings by and about African-American artists and art, published by Gregory R. Miller & Co.

In addition, Soul Jazz Records released a companion compilation album in 2017 in conjunction with the exhibition.

== Reception ==
Writing for The Observer, critic Laura Cumming said the exhibition tackled the questions of "what black art could, or should, be", calling the show "fantastically dynamic". Critic Rachel Campbell-Johnston noted in The Times that Soul of a Nation "is an intellectually fascinating and movingly heartfelt exhibition that [...] captures the radical spirit of its times." Reviewing the exhibition in London for ArtReview, writer Jeremy Atherton Lin said the show "has an erratic flow", comparing it to the ethos of the African-American art collective Spiral, which was featured extensively in the exhibition. In a five-star review for The Guardian, Jonathan Jones said the show "transforms how we see American art". Critic Philip Kennicott, reviewing the show in Arkansas for The Washington Post, called Soul of a Nation "a resounding success" and said the work featured in the show "refuses to be a footnote to or mere instrument of politics". In a review of the exhibition for Art in America, critic Elizabeth Fullerton said the featured art exhibited a narrative duality, telling "A tale of trauma and revolution as well as strength and hope". Critic Seph Rodney called the show "both a smart and a necessary exhibition" which "shows the interwoven and complex character of Black artistic production".

Critic Barry Schwabsky, writing in The Nation, called the show "a triumph" and said that "What gives much of the work in the exhibition its power is the incessant questioning—and self-questioning—that animates it." Writing for Artnet News about the original exhibition in London, critic Hettie Judah said that while Soul of a Nation was "a great exhibition", it was also "yet another group show, carrying the work of artists [...] well deserving of solo outings." Judah highlighted a quote by participating artist David Hammons from 1975, noting that Hammons' irritation at the time over black artists with very different artistic or aesthetic styles being thrown "into a barrel" in group exhibitions was still a reality more than 40 years after the artist had first voiced his frustration. Critic Re'al Christian, however, found the show's curation better than previous museum exhibitions of art by African-Americans, writing in Art Papers that Soul of a Nation was one of two recent shows that "do not attempt to present a unifying or all-encompassing curatorial vision of Black art", saying further that the exhibitions included "a much-needed multiplicity of artistic styles."

Writing in the journal Panorama, Levi Prombaum criticized the exhibition and curators' essays for overly emphasizing the dichotomy between abstraction and figuration. Prombaum wrote that, in particular, Godfrey's catalogue essay – which argued for a broader view of abstract art by black artists that went beyond the academic, formalist, or political contexts traditionally used to analyze such work – was unsuccessful, positing that the exhibition overall showed the need for institutions such as Tate to examine their own histories and historical choices, which had in turn impacted the way many black artists viewed their own work in relation to the art world and art market. Conversely, critic Holland Cotter, reviewing the exhibition in The New York Times, praised the exhibition's handling of the juxtaposition between figuration and abstraction, writing that the argument among artists "could be bitter" but the resulting works "were win-win", adding that "What we see in the show itself is not suppression but florescence."

Critic Waldemar Januszczak queried the effectiveness of the exhibition at resolving its own self-stated question of what it meant to be a black artist in America during the era, writing in The Sunday Times that "[h]aving asked the questions the show ahead never feels especially determined to answer them." Art historian Cheryl Finley positively reviewed many aspects of the exhibition in Artforum but questioned the ways in which the museum had marketed and monetized the show, writing that "Black culture and black music sell. The same is true of black struggle and black art. [...] The immersive online and on-site programming demonstrates how the show’s theme (read: 'brand') has been exploited".

ARTnews named Soul of a Nation the fifth most important art exhibition of the 2010s.

== Citations and references ==
=== Cited references ===
- Christian, Re'al (Spring 2020). "The Moment is Not Sufficient". Art Papers. Vol. 43, no. 4. pp. 10–17. OCLC 7219444. EBSCOhost 143054648.
