= Vietnam! Vietnam! =

- Directed by: Sherman Beck
- Produced by: John Ford (executive producer); Bruce Herschensohn (producer)
- Narrated by: Charlton Heston
- Edited by: Leon Selditz
- Distributed by: United States Information Agency
- Release date: September 1971
- Running time: 58 minutes
- Country: United States
- Language: English
- Budget: $252,751

Vietnam! Vietnam! is a United States Information Agency (USIA) film about the Vietnam War. The film, narrated by Charlton Heston, was shot on location in Vietnam in October–December 1968 but not released until 1971. Though John Ford, the executive producer, went to Vietnam, he did not participate in production work there. Ford later did supervise the editing and rewrote the film scenario.

Bruce Herschensohn, the producer, remarked that the purpose of the film was to provide a "balance" to the view which critics of the war were providing. Due to the changing political situation in Vietnam, the film went through numerous cuts and script alterations over a three-year period and, when finally released, managed to offend almost everyone. Critical reviews were unfavorable. USIA Director Frank Shakespeare left the decision on whether to order a copy of the film up to individual US embassies abroad, and only a few did.

== See also ==
- List of American films of 1971
