= Sherman Beck =

American artist (born 1942)

- Born: 1942 (age 83–84); Chicago, Illinois, US
- Education: Dunbar High School
- Occupation: Artist

Sherman Beck (born 1942) is a Black American artist born, raised, and based in Chicago, Illinois, known for his brightly colored kaleidoscopic paintings. Beck was one of the founding members of the Black arts collective AfriCOBRA in the 1970s.

== Early life and education ==
Beck was born to Leonora and Owen Beck in 1942 in Chicago, Illinois, the second child of three. Beck was a student at the Art Institute of Chicago, attending class at night. In 1976, he graduated with a degree in graphic and plastic arts. He taught art in Chicago public Schools for 22 years, at his alma mater Dunbar High School.

== The AfriCOBRA years ==
Sherman Beck was one of ten key original members of the AfriCOBRA (the African Commune of Bad Relevant Artists) Collective based in Chicago, Illinois. Three of Beck's paintings were included among 52 works making up the AfriCOBRA I: Ten in Search of a Nation exhibit at the Studio Museum in Harlem, which opened on June 21, 1970. Fellow AfriCOBRA member Barbara Jones-Hogu described Beck as a "magic maker" whose untitled works concerned themselves with the "spiritual essence" of the Black diaspora. Curated by Edward Spriggs, the show introduced one of the group's key aesthetic theories to New York audiences: Cool Ade Colors. "Cool Ade" signified on the brand name Kool-Aid, a sugary drink mix found in American homes of that era that came in bright colors like cherry, grape, lemon, orange, and lime. The colors used by Beck and other AfriCOBRA artists were bright, warm, eye-catching, and intense and, when paired with imagery and themes drawn from Black American life and culture, created a vivid aesthetic of "shine" that stood out from social realist styles of the era. In the exhibition catalog, Beck's personal statement read: "we all extend ourselves through the magic of our medium, and this is my medium." In September 1970, the show traveled to the National Center of Afro-American Arts in Boston and then continued on to Chicago for a 10-day run at the Black Expo in November of that year. All ten members traveled to this opening, including Beck, standing near their work and chatting with attendees. This marked the first time AfriCOBRA's work had been shown in their hometown. Beck left AfriCOBRA shortly after the close of the AfriCOBRA I show, as the group turned to collective printmaking.

== Style ==
Beck's painting features brightly colored geometric patterns, often in combination with free-floating portraits of Black historical figures such as Frederick Douglass, Biddy Mason, Fannie Lou Hamer, and Shirley Chisholm. Beck also incorporates elements of African history and design into his work, particularly masks. One of the main themes of his work involves expanding representations of the Black family, which was a foundational aspect of AfriCOBRA.

== Importance of Chicago ==
Beck was also active in the Southside Community Art Center in Chicago, a catalyzing organization for Black Art in the city. He donated work to an auction to support the center in 1973, alongside Richard Hunt, Geraldine McCullough, and others. Beck was also a board member of the organization.

== Freelance design work in the 1970s and 1980s ==
Beck worked as a freelance designer for the monthly Black lifestyle magazine Ebony throughout the 1970s and 1980s. His satiric, stylized pen-and-ink line drawings were featured in lighter fare such as "What's in a (Nick) Name?" but also accompanies harder-hitting political stories such as "The Empty Pocket Blues" about Black efforts to survive the recession and "Racism and Blacks Who Have 'Made It.'" One of Beck's paintings was displayed behind Ebony Executive Editor Herbert Nipson's desk when the magazine's new corporate offices opened up at 820 South Michigan Avenue in 1972, the first Black-owned and Black-designed building in downtown Chicago's business district, The Loop. Beck's painting was purchased for the Johnson Publishing Company's famed collection of African American Art along with work by Carrie Mae Weems, Henry Ossawa Tanner, Elizabeth Catlett, and others. Beck's work was among the works auctioned from the collection after the closure of the Johnson Publishing Company in January 2020 to repay business debts.

== Children's book illustrator ==
Sherman Beck illustrated the 1971 children's book Colors Around Me by Vivian Church, notable for his renderings of the many shades of African American skin tone and its clear message that "Black is Beautiful." It is featured in the San Francisco Public Library's Effie Lee Morris Historical Collection of children's literature that represents Black children in positive and uplifting ways.

== Later exhibitions ==
Beck has continued to make work and exhibit it, including two exhibits at the University of Illinois in the early 2000s. His painting Contemplation, was featured in the Southside Community Art Center's 2012 retrospective Maleness to Manhood: Reclamation of the Young Black Man. In 2018-2019, the Museum of Contemporary Art, North Miami mounted the exhibition AfriCOBRA: Messages to the People, curated by Jeffreen Hayes, that combined works exhibited in the first AfriCOBRA show in 1970 with the artists' more recent work. Beck had five paintings in the show: Portrait of Frederick Douglass (2010), Untitled (Male Face) (1970), Untitled (Female in Red) (1970), Ancestors (2005), and Portrait of Biddy Mason (2010).
