= Mark Godfrey (curator) =

British art historian, critic, and curator

- Born: Mark Benjamin Godfrey; London, United Kingdom
- Education: University College London
- Occupations: Art historian, critic, and curator

Mark Benjamin Godfrey is a British art historian, critic, and curator. He was a curator at Tate Modern from 2007 to 2021.

== Early life and education ==
Godfrey was born in the Hampstead Garden Suburb of London. He is Jewish; his father was from Leeds and his mother was from South Africa.

Godfrey was interested in art and art history from a young age. His father regularly took him to art galleries, while his mother taught him a tradition of collecting Judaica. He joined the Habonim Dror youth movement and went to Israel in 1992 to work for Habonim.

Godfrey earned his PhD in art history at University College London. His dissertation, titled Abstraction and the Holocaust, analysed the works of American artists and architects to "see how they addressed the Holocaust in an abstract way, without using direct images." With the support of a Leverhulme Research Fellowship, he published his work in book form in 2007. He was also a lecturer in art history and theory at the Slade School of Fine Art.

== Career ==
=== Tate Modern (2007–2021) ===
In 2007, Godfrey joined the Tate Modern as curator of contemporary art. Godfrey co-curated, with Nicholas Serota, an exhibition on Gerhard Richter in 2011. In 2014, he curated an exhibition on Richard Hamilton and co-curated exhibitions on Sigmar Polke (with Kathy Halbreich and Lanka Tattersall) and Christopher Williams (with Roxana Marcoci and Matthew Witkovsky).

In 2017, Godfrey was a member of the jury that selected Anne Imhof as recipient of the Golden Lion for best national participation in the 57th Venice Biennale. Later that year he co-curated Soul of a Nation: Art in the Age of Black Power with Zoé Whitley. The exhibition examined the response of artists in America to the Civil Rights Movement and the subsequent Black Power movement. It featured more than sixty artists including Frank Bowling, Betye Saar, and Barkley L. Hendricks. ARTnews highlighted Soul of a Nation as one of the most important art exhibitions of the decade. In 2019, Godfrey curated an exhibition on Franz West that included around two hundred works such as abstract sculptures, furniture, and collages. Later that year he organised a retrospective on Olafur Eliasson.

Paintings of Ku Klux Klan figures by Philip Guston were set to be part of a retrospective exhibited at the National Gallery of Art, the Tate Modern, the Museum of Fine Arts, Houston, and the Museum of Fine Arts, Boston in 2020 and 2021. In September 2020, the museums announced the postponement of the exhibition until 2024 because of "the racial justice movement that started in the US" following the murder of George Floyd. The decision generated controversy within the art world, and Godfrey, who was set to curate the exhibition at Tate Modern, was suspended from his position as senior curator after criticising the decision on social media. In March 2021, Godfrey announced his departure from the museum.

=== Independent curator (2021–present) ===
Godfrey was guest curator of a 2021 exhibit on the works of New York-based artist Jacqueline Humphries at the Wexner Center for the Arts in Columbus, Ohio.

In November 2022, Godfrey launched a free one-year course aimed for curators from low-income backgrounds, to be co-directed with Kerryn Greenberg and Rudi Minto de Wijs, who both previously worked at Tate.

With curator Katy Siegel, he edited the 2023 book Making Their Mark, on the works held by U.S.-based art collector Komal Shah and her husband. He co-curated a 2025 retrospective on Kerry James Marshall at the Royal Academy of Arts.

== Awards and honours ==
Godfrey won the Absolut Art Award in art writing in 2015. In 2020, he was recognised by the Association of Art Museum Curators for his work on Soul of a Nation.
