= Zoé Whitley =

American art historian and curator (born 1979)

Zoé Whitley OBE
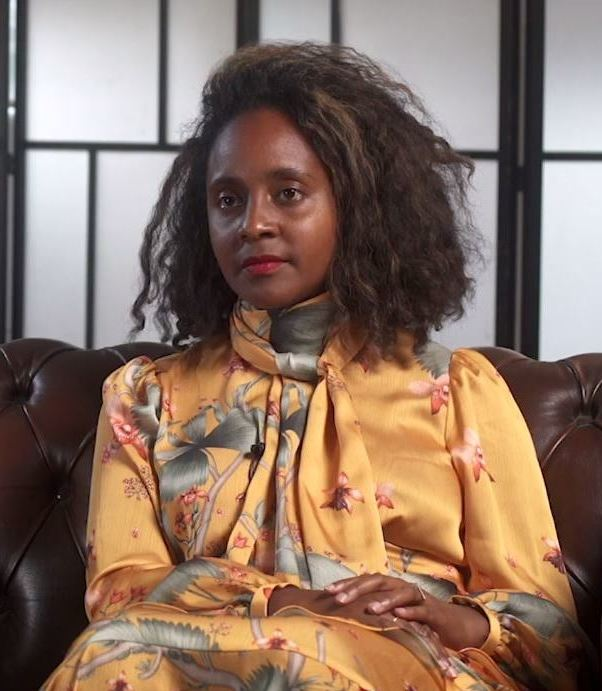
- Born: 30 December 1979 (age 46); Washington, D.C.
- Education: Swarthmore College (BA); Royal College of Art (MA); University of Central Lancashire (PhD)
- Occupations: Art historian, curator, museum director
- Employer: Chisenhale Gallery

Zoé Whitley OBE (born 30 December 1979) is an American art historian and curator. Between 2020 and March 2025, Whitley directed Chisenhale Gallery. Based in London, she has held curatorial positions at the Victoria and Albert Museum, the Tate galleries, and the Hayward Gallery. At the Tate galleries, Whitley co-curated the 2017 exhibition Soul of a Nation: Art in the Age of Black Power, which ARTnews called one of the most important art exhibitions of the 2010s. Soon after she was chosen to organise the British pavilion at the 2019 Venice Biennale.

Whitley's research interests include contemporary artists and art practices from Africa and the African diaspora.

== Early life and education ==
Zoé Whitley was born in Washington, D.C., on 30 December 1979. Her family moved to Los Angeles, California, when she was a teenager. In high school, she took classes on art history and studio art. She has recalled taking a trip to the Getty Villa around the time because her parents could not afford to send her on a school trip to Europe.

Whitley attended Swarthmore College in Pennsylvania, where she studied art history and French. For her first assignment on contemporary art, Whitley recounted basing her essay on the thoughts that a Black security guard working at the Philadelphia Museum of Art gave her about Nigredo (1984), a painting by Anselm Kiefer: "Everything that ended up in my essay, which my art-history professor said was really excellent, came from what he was able to share with me."

While attending Swarthmore, in 1999, Whitley completed an internship at the costume and textiles department of the Los Angeles County Museum of Art. There, department head Sharon Takeda and her colleague, Kaye Spilker, recommended Whitley become a curator. On their advice, Whitley studied at the Royal College of Art in London after graduating from Swarthmore in 2001, and earned a master's degree in design history. Her master's thesis examined Black representation in Vogue magazine. She earned a PhD from the University of Central Lancashire with British artist and curator Lubaina Himid.

== Career ==
Whitley started her career at the Victoria and Albert Museum in London in 2003. For two years, Whitley worked as an assistant curator in the museum's prints section. She then became a curator in 2005. In 2007, she organised Uncomfortable Truths, an exhibition that commemorated the bicentenary of the abolition of the British slave trade. The exhibition examined traces of the slave trade in contemporary art and design. In 2013, she stepped down from her position to begin a PhD at the University of Central Lancashire. As an independent curator, she co-curated the Afrofuturism-focused exhibition The Shadows Took Shape at the Studio Museum in Harlem.

=== Tate, 2013–2019 ===
In 2013, Whitley joined the Tate galleries. Between 2013 and 2015, she held dual curatorial positions at Tate Britain and Tate Modern as curator in international art and curator of contemporary British art, respectively. After April 2017, the focus of her work became international art and the collection of Tate Modern. With Mark Godfrey, she co-curated the 2017 exhibition Soul of a Nation: Art in the Age of Black Power, which examined the response of more than sixty artists in America to the Civil Rights Movement and the subsequent Black Power movement. The exhibition, according to Whitley, emphasised "art and artists, rather than a social history of art and ephemera," and includes works by Frank Bowling, Betye Saar, and Barkley L. Hendricks. ARTnews described Soul of a Nation as one of the most important art exhibitions of the 2010s. The Association of Art Museum Curators awarded Whitley one of its 2020 Curatorial Awards for Excellence for the exhibition.

=== Hayward Gallery, 2019–2020 ===
In 2019, Whitley became senior curator of the Hayward Gallery. Her first and last exhibition at the Hayward was Reverb: Sound into Art, an exhibition that featured sound art by Christine Sun Kim, Kahlil Joseph, and Oliver Beer.

Also in 2019, Whitley was the curator of the British pavilion at the 58th Venice Biennale, which featured an exhibition of sculptural installations, paintings, and prints by Cathy Wilkes. She became the first African American curator to organize a national pavilion at the Venice Biennale.

=== Chisenhale Gallery, 2020–2025 ===
In 2020, Whitley was appointed director of Chisenhale Gallery. During her time at the space, she organized exhibitions of work by Lotus L. Kang, Nikita Gale, Rindon Johnson, Alia Farid, Benoît Pieron, and Rachel Jones, among others.

With Nancy Ireson, Whitley co-curated Elijah Pierce's America, a retrospective of the works of American woodcarver Elijah Pierce exhibited at the Barnes Foundation in Philadelphia, Pennsylvania. Later that year, she oversaw Possessions, a section of the virtual "Frieze Viewing Room" that focuses on spirituality in contemporary art. In 2021, she was appointed to the Commission for Diversity in the Public Realm, a committee overseeing diversity in London's public monuments and its street and building names.

Whitley worked on a children's book written by Sharna Jackson, Black Artists Shaping the World, which serves as an introduction to Black artists for young audiences. The book won the 2022 Information Book Award from the School Library Association. The gallery announced in late 2024 that Whitley would leave her post as director in early 2025.

Whitley was appointed an Honorary Officer of the Order of the British Empire (OBE) in the 2025 Special Honours for services to Art.

== See also ==
- Women in the art history field
