= Nelson Stevens =

African-American artist

- Born: 1938; Bedford-Stuyvesant, Brooklyn, New York City, United States
- Died: July 22, 2022 (aged 83–84)
- Education: Ohio University, Kent State University

Nelson Stevens (1938–July 22, 2022) was an artist known for his involvement with Chicago-based Black art collective AfriCOBRA. Stevens' works are held by institutions such as the Art Institute of Chicago, the Brooklyn Museum, Memphis Brooks Museum of Art, Pennsylvania Academy of the Fine Arts, the Smithsonian National Museum of African American History and Culture, and the Tate.

== Early life and education ==
Stevens was born Nelson Lowell Stevens Jr in Bedford-Stuyvesant, Brooklyn, New York City. He began attending weekend classes at the Museum of Modern Art after winning a spot in the fourth grade; his winning piece was inspired by Picasso's Guernica.

In 1962 he earned a Bachelor of Fine Arts from Ohio University, and in 1969 he earned his Master of Fine Arts in studio art and art history from Kent State University.

== Art career ==
In 1956 Stevens began painting murals at jazz nightclubs in Utica, New York; in return, the businesses provided Stevens with free meals.

Stevens joined AfriCOBRA in 1969 after meeting co-founder Jeff Donaldson at the College Art Association Conference in Boston. He, along with other members, created silkscreen prints of his work as a way to make art more accessible to the general public; they were initially sold for only $10–15 at local events.

In 1971, Stevens designed posters for a project at Northern Illinois University called Color Rappers, which aimed to raise scholarship money for Black students through selling art.

In 1992 Stevens began the Art in the Service of the Lord project, which commissioned African-American artists to create biblical art featuring Black individuals. The project was inspired by an experience in which a Black-owned funeral home approached Stevens and asked to commission him for a painting to replace their work of a blonde and blue-eyed Mary and Jesus. The works were sold as a series of calendars through Spirit Wood Productions, a group founded by Stevens and his wife, Martha Grier. The calendars were sold for four years, with about 15,000 calendars sold each year. Some works from the project were exhibited at the Schomburg Center for Research in Black Culture in New York City in 1994.

=== Style ===
Stevens viewed the creation of art as "for the sake of people" rather than "for art's sake". His art featured "bold", "Kool-Aid" colors and "unexpected lines", and often included lettering or text. His works frequently focused on pan-Africanism and positive portrayals of both historical and contemporary Black subjects.

Stevens largely focused on two-dimensional paintings, although his body of work does include some collages.

=== Murals ===
In 1973, Stevens began a program to create public murals in Springfield, Massachusetts, with the aid of his students from University of Massachusetts Amherst. Over the following four years Stevens and his team created 36 murals. Although many of the murals were lost in the intervening years, two of the murals – Wall of Black Music and Tribute to Black Women – were recreated in 2022. In 1973, Stevens also created a mural in Boston, entitled Work to Unify African People, which was intended to parallel Dana Chandler's mural, Knowledge is power so Stay in School.

In 1980, Stevens created a mural, entitled Centennial Vision, for the Tuskegee University to celebrate their 100th anniversary. It was unveiled in July of that year. In 1989 Stevens and five Job Corps students collaborated on a mural to commemorate the program's 25th anniversary. The mural was installed in the U.S. Department of Labor's headquarters in Washington, D.C.

=== Exhibitions ===
Stevens' work has appeared in exhibitions showcasing art from various AfriCOBRA members. His work has also been displayed among other Black artists, including at UMass Amherst and Springfield Technical Community College in February 1992 (the latter of which Stevens also curated), at the Jamaica Plain Art Center in 1994, and at the Northampton Center for the Arts in 1995. Stevens also curated a 1991 exhibition of African American art entitled "Rhythming".

A one-man show of Stevens' work was shown at the Studio Museum in Harlem in 1973, and at the Afro-American Cultural Center of American International College in January and February 1978. In 2009 a collection of Stevens' work was shown at UMass Amherst. In September 2019, Stevens had a solo exhibition titled "Work from the 60s to the Present" at the Kravets Wehby Gallery in New York City.

In September 2022, a retrospective of Stevens' work, entitled "Nelson Stevens' Color Rapping", opened at the University of Maryland Global Campus, where it remained on view until January 2023. The exhibition then transferred to the D'Amour Museum of Fine Arts in Springfield, Massachusetts, where it was scheduled to be on view from March until September 2023.

== Teaching career ==
After earning his bachelors degree, Stevens became a middle school art teacher in Cleveland, Ohio. At the time he also taught at the Karamu House. The Cleveland Board of Education later placed him at the Cleveland Museum of Art.

Stevens was an assistant professor at Northern Illinois University from 1969 until 1971, during which he taught a course on African-American art history. He was a professor of art in the African-American Studies Department at the University of Massachusetts Amherst from 1972 until 2003. During his tenure he also functioned as faculty advisor to DRUM, a student literary and cultural magazine.

== Personal life ==
While living in Cleveland, Stevens frequently attended The Jazz Temple.

Stevens lived in Springfield, Massachusetts from 1972 until 2003. After his retirement in 2003, Stevens moved to Owings Mills, Maryland.

He and Marciana G. Sealey, had one daughter, Nadya Stevens in 1983.
