= Roxy Paine =

American painter and sculptor

- Born: 1966 (age 59–60); New York City, U.S.
- Education: College of Santa Fe; Pratt Institute
- Known for: Sculpture, painting
- Movement: Contemporary Art
- Awards: Guggenheim Fellowship 2006; Aldrich Museum trustees award 1997

Roxy Paine (born 1966, New York City) is an American painter and sculptor widely known for his installations that often convey elements of conflict between the natural world and the artificial plains man creates. He was educated at both the College of Santa Fe (now Santa Fe University of Art and Design) in New Mexico and the Pratt Institute in New York.

Since 1990, Paine's works have been exhibited in major collections and galleries across the United States, Germany, Sweden, England, the Netherlands, and Israel. His most reviewed exhibitions include Replicants, Machines, Dendroids, and Dioramas. Roxy Paine currently lives and works in Brooklyn and Treadwell, New York.

== Biography ==
Paine was born in New York City and raised in the suburbs of northern Virginia. Throughout his childhood, he spent his free time exploring the wooded, overgrown areas of land that separated housing developments in his neighborhood. He describes his experience of growing up in suburbia as a "twisted vision of nature", his environment possessing an "overwhelming blandness". Around age 13 or 14, Paine used his local creek as a place to explore.

"There was a creek nearby when I was growing up. That's where I spent most of my time. I would constantly reroute the stream, building dams. I was mostly interested in the water. What I remember distinctly about nature in the suburbs were the borders. The natural world is totally controlled and manipulated in suburbia."

At age 15, Paine ran away to California to live with his brother, a hiker and rock climber. His brother's "outdoor western" influence spurred them to hike places like Yosemite and Joshua Tree. Living in California helped Paine make his decision to become an artist. He moved to New Mexico and enrolled at the College of Santa Fe, but he soon dropped out due to poor relations with his professors.

"In general, the teachers hated me. I always had problems with art teachers. I don't know why. I didn't go in trying to be confrontational, but it always ended up with bad blood somehow."

He then moved to New York and attended Pratt Institute for a time, originally as a painting major but later switching to sculpture. In addition to paintings, Paine produced unusual, functional ceramic and metal musical instruments. He eventually dropped out of Pratt, and with help from some of his colleagues, formed the artist collective Brand Name Damages in 1989.

== Work ==
In his body of work, Paine mirrors natural processes, drawing increasingly on the tension between organic and man-made environments, between the human desire for order and nature's drive to reproduce. His highly detailed simulations of natural phenomena include an ambitious series of hand-wrought stainless steel trees, vitrines of mushroom and plant life in various states of decay and several large-scale machines designed to replicate creative processes. Many of his works create a platform to ask aesthetic questions about art, the natural, and the unnatural world. Rather than answer these questions like his counterparts, he ignites the flame of inquiry. Collectively, his works demonstrate the human attempt to impose order on natural forces, depicting the struggle between the natural and the artificial, the rational and the instinctual. Paine has said, "I'm interested in taking entities that are organic and outside of the industrial realm, feeding them into an industrial system, and seeing what results from that force-feeding. The end results are a seamless containment of these opposites."

=== Early work ===
Paine began showing his work in Williamsburg, Brooklyn in 1990 and 1991 at an artist run collective called Brand Name Damages (which he helped to found) and he had his first solo exhibition at the short-lived Herron Test-Site in October 1992. His early work consisted of kinetic and time-based sculptures such as Viscous Pult, 1990, which consisted of a paint brush smearing ketchup, white paint and motor oil on the gallery space's front window; and Displaced Sink, 1992, which had a leaking pipe in the ceiling dripping water on a tall stack of soap bars, leaving a pool of semi-liquid soap to collect on the gallery floor.

Roxy Paine's Dinner of the Dictators, 1993–95.

His next solo exhibition was at Ronald Feldman Gallery in 1995, and it included other kinetic works, but the central and most critically acclaimed work was a piece called Dinner of the Dictators, 1993–95, a vitrine enclosing the taxidermied favorite meals of infamous dictators, ranging from Genghis Khan and Adolf Hitler to Napoleon Bonaparte and Suharto. The research alone took eight months, and overall, the work took two years to produce, opening Paine to new approaches and processes in his work.

From this point onward, Paine's work separated into a few distinct but nevertheless related categories. The first involves naturalistic works: minutely precise reproductions of natural objects like mushrooms, leafy plants or poppies. A second category consists of machine-based works: he has devised a number of conceptually-challenging art-making machines, like the SCUMAK (Auto Sculpture Maker), 1998, PMU (Painting Manufacturing Unit), 1999–2000, and the Erosion Machine, 2005. Bridging the gap between the naturalistic and mechanized works, Paine also creates large-scale stainless steel trees and boulders of varying sizes (ranging from 8 – 50 feet in height).

=== Replicants ===
Roxy Paine's Amanita Field, 2001, installed in Germany.

Paine's vitrines and botanical works often feature replicas of plants that have been discovered as extremely poisonous or have been used by humans for experimental hallucinogenic or drug experiences. The living plants are cast and subsequently rendered in thermoset polymers, paint, lacquer, and epoxy, among other materials. Crop, 1997–98, shows a field of poppies, with ripened pods exposing the evidence of raw opium being readied for harvest. The piece embodies the shifting views of the beauty of a field of wild flowers and the grave potential of drug addiction. Amanita Muscaria Field, 2000, shows a field of psychoactive mushrooms that appear as if they are sprouting from the gallery floor. This field might present multiple readings: are these works a hallucinogenic vision on their own or do they represent the plant life that offers the possibility of arriving at that vision? Another related series of works is that of the Dead Amanita vitrines, lifelike mushrooms seem to be decaying under glass. The genus Amanita is a group of poisonous and psychoactive mushrooms that has some species that are among the deadliest if ingested by humans.

Roxy Paine's Datura 2, 2006

Another example is the leafy plant genus Datura, which has long been used as a poison and hallucinogen; many species are known by common names such as Hell's Bells or Devil's weed. Paine's re-creation of various species of Datura take on a state of potential, presenting us with a deceptively simple plant that nonetheless contains complex molecules that can give rise to an altered state of consciousness.

=== Machines ===
Removing the artist's hand in the creative process and replacing it with a computer program is the crux of Paine's machine-based works. His first art-making machine, Paint Dipper, 1997, employed a steel armature that continuously dipped canvases into a vat of paint over the course of time, creating works that collect latex paint stalactites along the bottom edge. SCUMAK (Auto Sculpture Maker), 1998–2001, melts plastic with pigments and periodically extrudes them onto a conveyor belt, creating bulbous shaped sculptures that are each unique.

Roxy Paine's SCUMAK 2, 2001, installed at the Museum of Contemporary Art, Detroit, 2007.

PMU (Painting Manufacturing Unit), from 1999 to 2000, involves a metal painting arm that is programmed to expel white paint onto a canvas according to specific instructions programmed into the machine. The resulting works often can evoke landscapes or possibly layers of geological sediment.

Most recently, Paine introduced his Erosion Machine, 2005, which consists of a robotic arm that traces and cuts patterns into large blocks of stone. The course of the arm's movement is determined by data sets, such as weather conditions and school test results. The work suggests the corrosive effects of human imposition on the environment while at the same time represents the transformation of the banal into the beautiful.

About the SCUMAK (Auto Sculpture Maker), art historian Jonathan Fineburg wrote that "The beauty of the machine and the eccentricity of the results are also a paean to the romantic. Paine positions both his gardens and his machines at a fluid interface of man, nature, and science; they take the viewer to an intuitive experience of the liminal place at which scientists have arrived as they begin to redesign the human genome and connect living neurons with silicon chips."

=== Dendroids ===
Paine uses both mechanical means and the innate logic of natural forms to create his "Dendroid" tree-like sculptures. Paine's meticulous research and observation of a variety of tree species help him to understand the "language" of how a tree grows, and from there he creates fictional tree species that grow to a logic of their own. Paine has said:

I've processed the idea of a tree and created a system for its form. I take this organic majestic being and break it down into components and rules. The branches are translated into pipe and rod.

Employing the language that he has invented pertaining to each of these fictive species, Paine's trees are "grown" through a laborious process of welding together the cylindrical piping and rods of diminishing size. He has also described his aims with the Dendroids series by saying, "I have been seeking to expand the edges of the language, and send the work outward into those edges. Essentially, I am establishing the rules of a language, only to then break those rules."

The first of these dendroids was Impostor, 1999, now at the Wanas Foundation, in Knislinge, Sweden. He has gone on to create 25 of these sculptures, including Bluff, 2002, which premiered in New York's Central Park during the Whitney Biennial in 2002, and the very ambitious Conjoined, 2007, recently on display in Manhattan's Madison Square Park (through December 31, 2007). Conjoined is a 40 ft tall by 45 ft wide sculpture of two trees whose branches cantilever in space and connect in mid air. Paine creates two different fictional tree species where each branch from one tree joins with a branch from the other. For the observer, it is unclear where one tree begins and the other ends. "Conjoined" was acquired in 2008 by and is on display at the Modern Art Museum of Fort Worth.

Paine's recent sculpture, Inversion, 2008, was installed in the Public Art Projects section of Art Basel 39, in Basel, Switzerland in June 2008. It was also part of FREEDOM: Den Haag Sculptuur 2008 in The Hague, Netherlands through August 2008.

Maelstrom, 2009, was on view at the Metropolitan Museum of Art Roof from April 28 - November 29, 2009 and Graft, 2009 was installed at the National Gallery of Art Sculpture Garden in Washington, DC, in the fall of 2009. When asked about Maelstrom Paine described it as existing on five "levels" at once:

"On one level, it's a forest that has been downed by an unseen force—a force of nature or, perhaps, a force of man. I also want the sculpture to be the force itself, a swirling, churning force. The word 'maelstrom' actually has a Dutch root; it literally means 'grinding stream,' ... The third state is trees in the state of becoming abstractions. There are areas with recognizable tree parts and then others where representation is stretching, breaking apart, and coalescing again ... I want the fourth state of trance to be a pipeline in a factory that's run amuck. This is getting back to the root of the material, so to speak, which is purely industrial. Here the piece is embracing its source. And, finally, the fifth state is that of a mental storm, or what I envision happens during an epileptic seizure."

Distillation, 2010, was on view at James Cohan Gallery in New York from October 16 - December 11, 2010, and One Hundred Foot Line, 2010, was installed permanently at the National Gallery of Canada, in Ottawa, Ontario. Distillation, as described by Hilarie Sheets in The New York Times,

pushes the metaphoric content that underpins these sculptures to new extremes. It still uses arboreal forms, but they now mesh with other overtly defined branching systems: a vascular network of arteries and veins with two plump kidneys, mushroom colonies and their germinating mycelia, neuron bundles and taxonomic diagrams, and raw pipelines connected to steel tanks and industrial valves.

Ferment was permanently installed in April 2011 on the south lawn of The Nelson-Atkins Museum of Art in Kansas City, Missouri. Taking more than three years to produce, this 56-foot-tall stainless steel dendroid sculpture, as described by Paine, "was trying to capture a churning, swirling force."

In June 2014, Symbiosis (2011) was installed in Philadelphia, Pennsylvania, in Iroquois Park, originally on temporary loan to the Association for Public Art courtesy of Paine and Marianne Boesky Gallery. In 2015, the Association for Public Art received a grant from the Daniel W. Dietrich II Trust, Inc. to acquire Symbiosis, enabling the dendroid to remain in Philadelphia.

=== Dioramas ===
In September 2013 Paine debuted the first two installations of a new series of work utilizing large-scale dioramas. The two installations were revealed in an exhibition at the Kavi Gupta gallery in Chicago. The new pieces, meticulously carved from wood, are life-size replicas of a fast-food restaurant and a control room, respectively.

The new work draws from a complex dialog of Western and Eastern philosophies which both embrace and deconstruct the values and conceptual core of Paine's earlier work. Christian Viveros-Faune, in an interview with Paine, discussed Paine's interests in the Japanese philosophical aesthetic of Wabi-Sabi, which emphasizes the beauty within natural and unpredictable flaws. Paine also told Viveros-Faune of an interest in Poststructuralism and the theories of Michel Foucault on Episteme, as described by Paine-

"I have been very influenced by Foucault's idea of the episteme, the knowledge structure and base of an era which determines what kind of questions can and cannot be asked at any point in time. I think it is particularly pertinent at this moment when the amount of information is so vast, and access to it so instantaneous; yet the kinds of questions being asked feel throttled and narrow, a retreat into the comforts of each person's hyper-specialized realm of knowledge."

Paine further discussed his interest in the new work as a manifestation of "A copy of a copy of a copy," which could be connected Foucault's fellow poststructuralist, Jean Baudrillard.

== Gallery ==
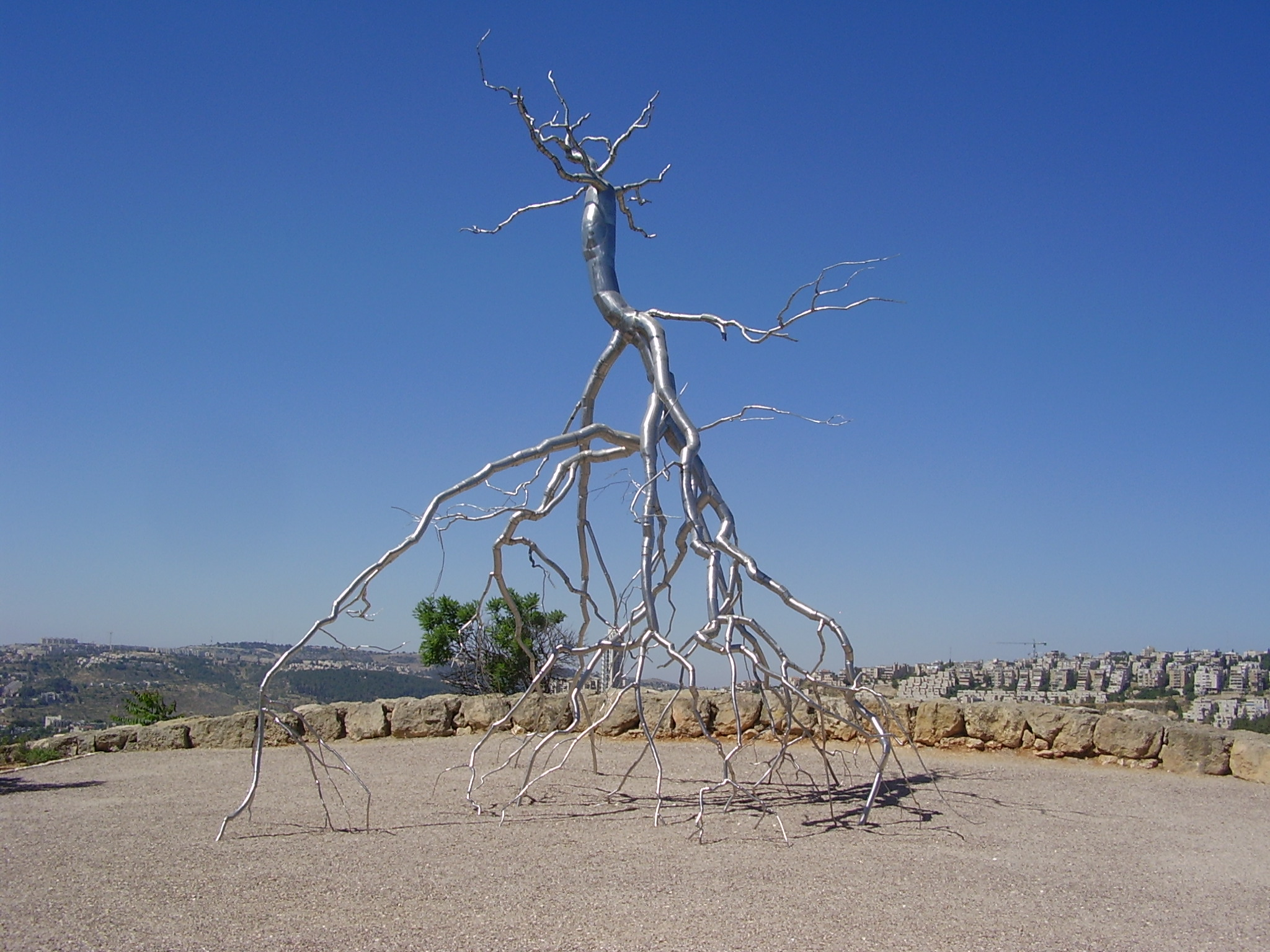
Inversion, 2008, at Billy Rose Art Garden, Israel Museum

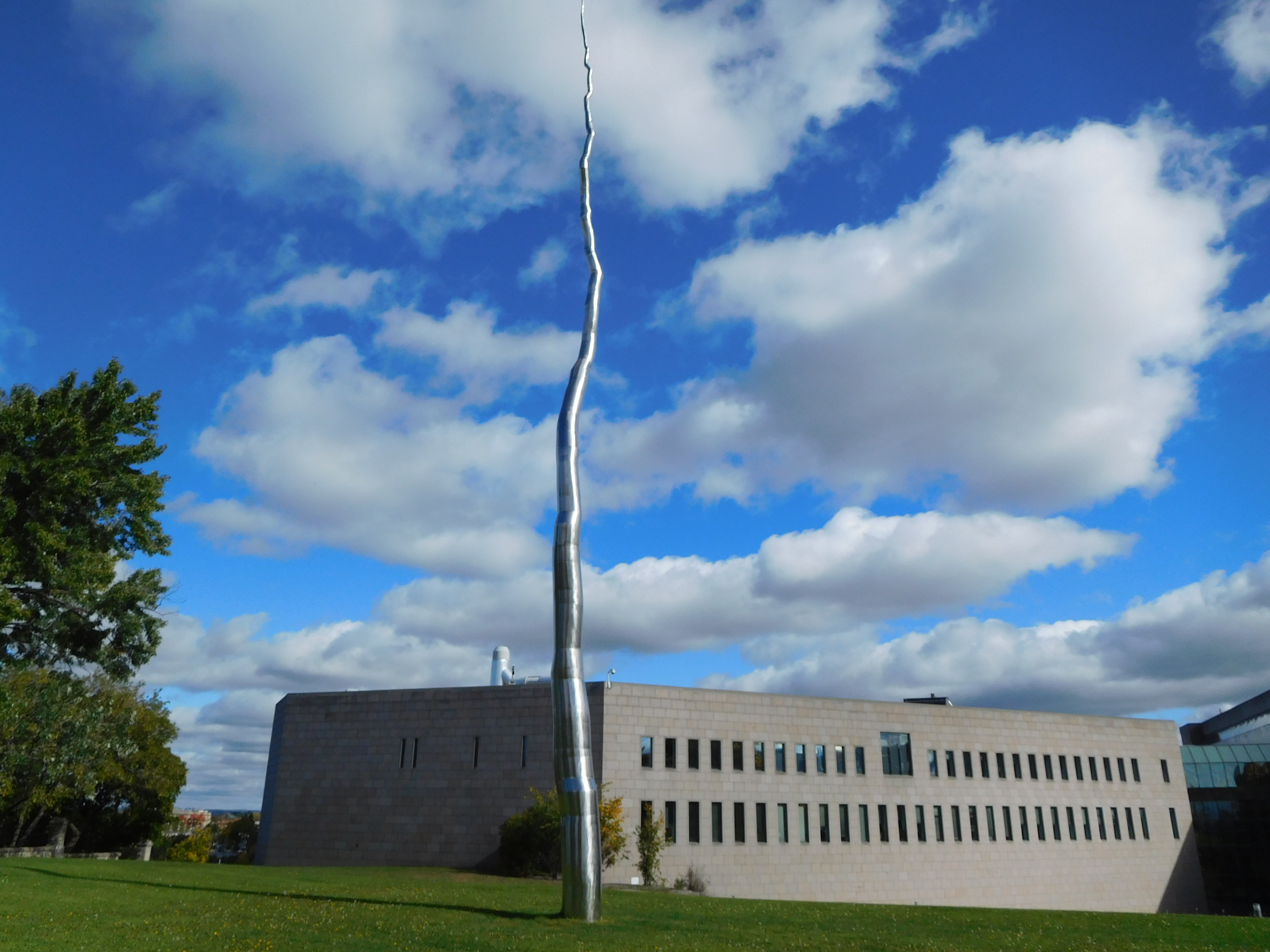
One Hundred Foot Line, 2010, National Gallery of Canada

== Awards ==
- Roxy Paine was awarded by the John Simon Guggenheim Memorial Foundation Fellowship in 2006.
- He also received a Trustees Award for an Emerging Artist by, The Aldrich Museum of Contemporary Art, Ridgefield, CT in 1997.

== Public collections ==
The artist Roxy Paine contributed many of his works to the following locations:

- City of Beverly Hills, CA
- Crystal Bridges Museum of American Art, Bentonville, AR
- De Pont Museum of Contemporary Art, Tilburg, The Netherlands
- Denver Art Museum, Denver, CO
- Frederik Meijer Gardens and Sculpture Park, Grand Rapids, MI
- Hirshhorn Museum and Sculpture Garden, Washington, D.C.
- Il Giardino Dei Lauri, Città della Pieve (PG), Italy
- Israel Museum, Jerusalem
- Modern Art Museum of Fort Worth, TX
- Museum of Modern Art, New York, NY
- National Gallery of Art Sculpture Garden, Washington, D.C.
- National Gallery of Canada, Ottawa, ON
- Nelson-Atkins Museum of Art, Kansas City, MO
- The New School for Social Research, New York, NY
- North Carolina Museum of Art, Raleigh, NC
- Fundación NMAC, Cadiz, Spain
- Olympic Sculpture Park, Seattle Art Museum, WA
- Rose Art Museum, Brandeis University, Waltham, MA
- Saint Louis Art Museum, St. Louis, MO
- San Francisco Museum of Modern Art, CA
- Sheldon Memorial Art Gallery, University of Nebraska, Lincoln, NE
- Wanas Foundation, Knislinge, Sweden
- Whitney Museum of American Art, New York, NY

== See also ==
- Fig, Joe (2015). Inside the artist's studio. ISBN 978-1-61689-468-9. OCLC 923017419.
- Heartney, Eleanor; Paine, Roxy (2009). Roxy Paine. Prestel. ISBN 978-3-7913-4137-8. OCLC 294884961.
- Paine, Roxy; Schall, Jan (2011). Roxy Paine: Ferment. ISBN 978-0-615-43782-8. OCLC 699379092.
