= Albany Museum of Art =

Museum in Albany, Georgia

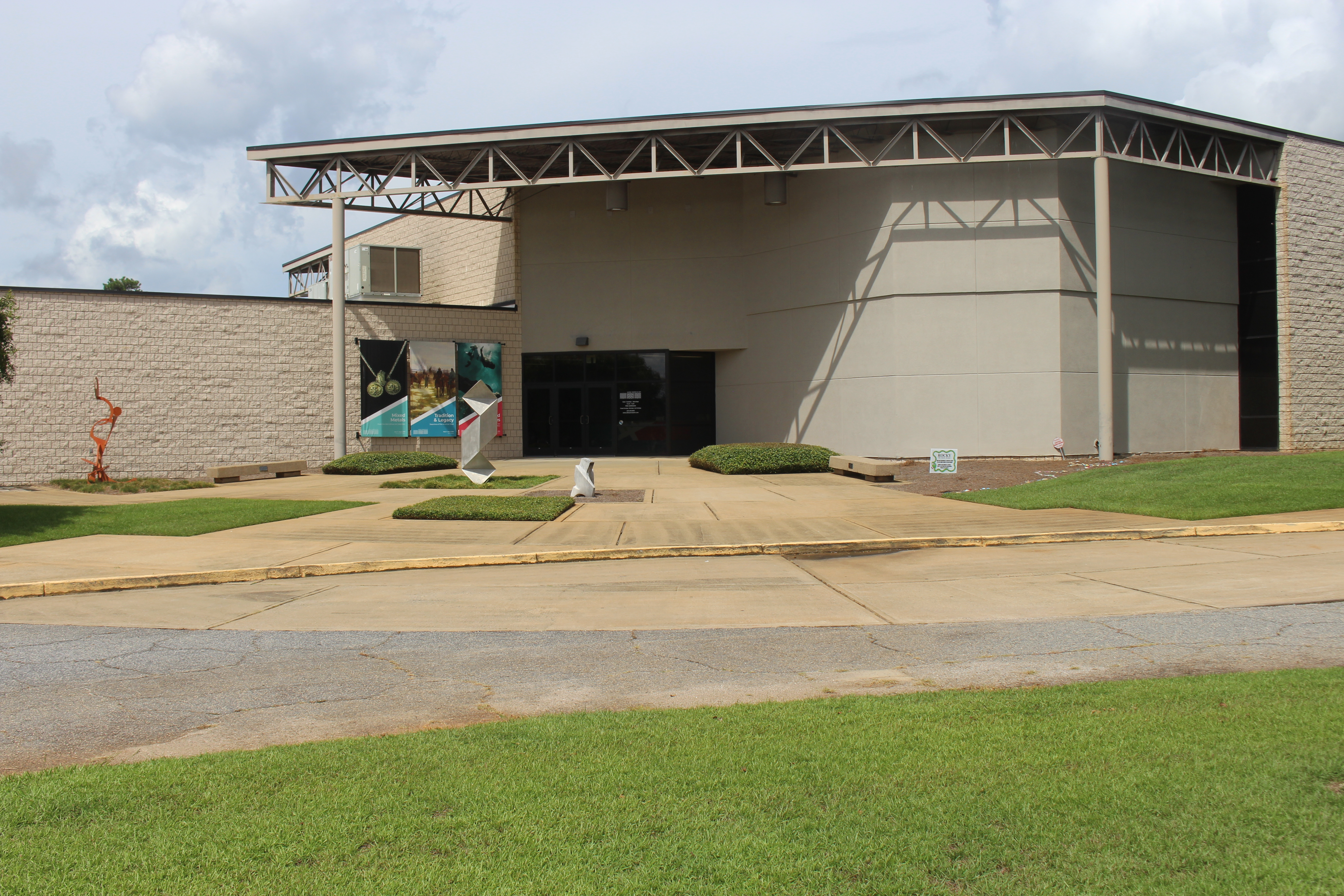
- Established: 5 September 1983; 42 years ago
- Location: 311 Meadowlark Drive, Albany, Georgia, United States
- Coordinates: 31.5843755°N 84.2089562°W
- Accreditation: American Alliance of Museums
- Collection size: 2,400 original works
- Executive director: Dr. Andrew J. Wulf
- Website: albanymuseum.com

The Albany Museum of Art is located in Albany, Georgia, United States. The museum is a non-profit organization governed by a 28-member elected board of directors.

== History ==
The museum was founded in 1964 as the outgrowth of the Southwest Georgia Art Association. It was first housed in an empty hosiery mill, then in 1969, through the generosity of W.B. Haley, Jr., the Art Association constructed a small facility in a local park. In 1983, after a successful capital campaign, the citizens of Albany and Southwest Georgia opened the Albany Museum of Art, a new museum facility located adjacent to the West Campus of Albany State University (formerly Darton College). The Museum facility contains six gallery spaces, a museum store, a 200-seat, multi-functional auditorium, an interactive children’s gallery, and a classroom for studio arts.

On January 2, 2017, the AMA facility sustained serious damage from the straight line winds that blew through the city. Just seven months later, the museum reopened three of the six galleries located on the first floor, the museum sales gallery, classroom, and auditorium.

While the permanent collection is currently located in an off-site storage facility, the museum continues to present a robust schedule of exhibitions and programming.

The Museum is making plans to move to a downtown facility, pending the location of a suitable building. After the move, the museum will be reunited with its permanent collection.

== Collection and exhibits ==
The growing collection of the AMA now includes 19th and 20th century American and European paintings, drawings, sculptures, watercolors, prints, and photographs and what has become one of the largest collections of traditional African art in the Southeast outside of a university setting.

The museum displays more than 200 works of African, European, and American art from a collection of 2,400 original works.

The African collection includes masks, sculpture, pottery, baskets, textiles, jewelry and gold weights. It is one of the largest collections of Sub-Saharan art in the Southeastern United States.

The American and European collections include paintings, drawings, photographs, and sculpture. The American collection includes paintings by Edward Henry Potthast, Joseph H. Sharp, Ernest Lawson, Reginald Marsh and A.L. Ripley.

=== Galleries ===
- The Banks Haley Gallery - traveling or curated exhibitions of national importance
- The East Gallery - works by regional and national artists
- The West Gallery - works by regional and national artists
- The Ralph Hodges Sales Gallery - works available for sale which are created by local and regional artisans
- The AMAzing Spaces Gallery - interactive learning through hands-on experiences for children. It features masks, the “Recollections Room” in which visitors can make colorful works of art just by moving through the space.

(TEMPORARILY CLOSED)*The Miller Gallery - art and artifacts from the AMA’s Sub-Saharan African collection (TEMPORARILY CLOSED)*The Raymond F. Evans Sporting Art Gallery - wildlife and sporting art (TEMPORARILY CLOSED)*The McCormack Gallery - exhibitions from the AMA Permanent Collection, collections on loan

=== Exhibitions available for loan ===
(TEMPORARILY UNAVAILABLE)

- “Master Drawings from the Shaffer Collection” - 34 master drawings from the late 15th century through the early 18th century including representations of Dutch, Flemish, French, German, and Italian schools.
- “Mose Tolliver” - 14 paintings by African-American folk artist Mose Tolliver.
- “Warhol Flowers” - 10 silk screen prints by Andy Warhol that have been hand-watercolored.
- "Studio Glass from the Schuman Collection" - 63 sculptural works by artists such as Harvey Littleton and Dominick Labino.

== See also ==
- African art
