= Misch Kohn =

American painter and printmaker

Misch Kohn (1916 – 2003) was an American artist. His works are part of the collections of several major museums including the Museum of Modern Art in New York City and National Gallery of Art in Washington, D.C.

Kohn was born in Kokomo, Indiana. He studied at the Herron School of Art in Indianapolis.

Several of his works are held by the Philadelphia Museum of Art.
