= Gerald Williams (artist) =

American visual artist (born 1941)

- Born: 1941 (age 84–85); Chicago, Illinois, United States
- Education: Englewood High School
- Alma mater: Roosevelt University; Chicago Teachers College; Howard University
- Occupation: Visual artist
- Movement: AfriCOBRA; Black Arts Movement

Gerald Williams (born 1941 in Chicago, Illinois) is an American visual artist whose work has been influential within the Black Arts Movement, a transnational aesthetic phenomenon that first manifested in the 1960s and continues to evolve today. Williams was a founding member of the Chicago artists' collective AfriCOBRA. His work has been featured in exhibitions at some of the most important museums in the world, including the Tate Modern, the Museum of Contemporary Art, Chicago, the Studio Museum in Harlem, and the Institute of Contemporary Art, Philadelphia.

In addition to his influence as a contemporary artist, he has served in the Peace Corps, taught in the public schools systems of Chicago and Washington, D.C., and served as an Arts and Crafts Center Director for the United States Air Force. In 2015, he moved back to his childhood neighborhood of woodlawn, Chicago, where he currently lives and works.

In 2019, Williams was awarded the Honorary Doctorate of Philosophy in Art by the School of the Art Institute of Chicago, along with his co-founders of AfriCOBRA, Jae Jarrell, and Wadsworth A. Jarrell.

== Education ==
Williams graduated in 1959 from Englewood High School, which was then located at 6201 S. Stewart. The school was torn down in 1979, reopened in another location, and then that location was closed in 2008. After high school, Williams enrolled as an accounting major at the downtown Chicago campus of Roosevelt University, located at 430 South Michigan Avenue. After leaving Roosevelt, he studied from January 1961 to December 1962 at Woodrow Wilson Junior College on South Halsted Street, known today as Kennedy-King College, where he received his associate degree in art.

He served for two years in the Air Force, after which he returned to Chicago in 1966 and enrolled in night classes at Loop College, now known as Harold Washington College, while also taking drawing and design classes at the Art Institute of Chicago. In 1967, he enrolled full-time in art classes at Chicago Teachers College, now known as Chicago State University. He earned his Bachelor of Arts degree from Chicago Teachers College in 1969. In 1973, Williams moved to Washington, D.C., and enrolled in the graduate program at Howard University. He earned his Masters of Fine Arts degree in painting from Howard in 1976.

== Background ==
Gerald Williams was born in 1941 on the south side of Chicago, Illinois. He grew up on South Evans Street, a block from Oak Woods Cemetery, in the Woodlawn neighborhood, with 10 siblings in a house his mother and father owned. His father worked in the steel mills at South Works that were then prevalent around the area where the Calumet River meets Lake Michigan. In February 1963, Williams enlisted in the United States Air Force as an illustrator. He did his basic training at Lackland Air Force Base in San Antonio, Texas, and was then assigned to the graphics shop at McChord Air Force Base in Tacoma, Washington. While at McChord, Williams transferred into the education department and soon accepted a transfer to Kadena Air Force Base in Okinawa, Japan, where he served the remainder of his military service. Williams returned to Chicago in August 1966 to finish school. While working full-time as a facilities manager for the art department at Northeastern Illinois University, which was Chicago Teachers College North back then, he met an artist named Jeff Donaldson, who was on the faculty there. Donaldson invited Williams to join him and several other black artists who had started getting together casually once a week to discuss aesthetics. At the time, Williams was also renting studio space in a coach house in Chicago's Hyde Park. After attending the first meeting with Donaldson and the others, Williams realized that, unbeknownst to him, another member of the group, Wadsworth Jarrell, was the artist who was renting the other side of the coach house. Over the course of the next few years, Williams, Donaldson, Jarrell, along with Jae Jarrell and Barbara J. Jones, became the nucleus of AfriCOBRA, one of the most influential, transnational black art movements of the 20th Century. By 1970, the group also included Napoleon Henderson, Nelson Stevens, Sherman Beck, Omar Lama, and Carolyn M. Lawrence.

In 1969, Williams finished his undergraduate degree and began teaching in the Chicago Public Schools. His first teaching assignment was at Bradwell School of Excellence in Chicago's South Shore neighborhood. Later, he worked at nearby Bryn Mawr Elementary until the end of 1973 when he left to attend Howard University. While teaching, Williams continued his efforts with AfriCOBRA. Epiphanies gained from the group's weekly discussions manifested in bodies of work, which the group began sharing in unified exhibitions, starting with the show AfriCOBRA I: Ten in Search of a Nation, which ran from June 21 to August 30 at the Studio Museum in Harlem.

In 1973, Williams left Chicago for what would end up being a 42-year span. He first moved to Washington, D.C., where he earned his MFA in painting at Howard University. After finishing his MFA, he participated along with other members of AfriCOBRA as a United States delegate to FESTAC 77, the Second World Black and African Festival of Arts and Culture, which was held in Lagos, Nigeria. Only months after he returned from Nigeria, Williams joined the Peace Corps, returning to Africa. He accepted an assignment as Pre-vocational Director in the Jacaranda School for the Mentally Handicapped in Nairobi, Kenya, where he mentored students to produce handicrafts that were marketed in a store on the campus and in shops in town.

Williams concluded his two-year assignment in the Peace Corps in 1979, ending it with a solo exhibition of his paintings titled Can You Feel the Brand New Day, which was held at the French Cultural Center in Nairobi. In 1980, after leaving Kenya, he went on a two-month journey on his own to Cairo, Egypt, as well as to Liberia, Sierra Leone, Nigeria, and Senegal. In Dakar, Senegal, Williams exhibited many of his works from the Nairobi show in the American Cultural Center.

On his return to Washington, D.C., he worked for four years as a teacher in the public school system. In 1984, he accepted a job directing the arts and crafts center on an American Air Force base in South Korea. After five years in South Korea, he was transferred to Japan to direct the arts and crafts center at Yokota Air Base, about 25 minutes outside of Tokyo. He stayed there for three years, accepting a transfer to Shaw Air Force Base in Sumter, South Carolina, in 1992. In 1996, he transferred again, this time to Aviano Air Base, a NATO air base in Aviano, Italy, run by the Italian government, but which hosts the USAF 31st Fighter Wing. In 1999, Williams was transferred back to Shaw AFB in South Carolina. In 2001, he accepted his final transfer, to direct the arts and crafts center at Lajes Field, in the Azores, a group of islands off the coast of Portugal.

In 2005, Williams retired in Sumter, South Carolina, where he continued to focus full-time on his art. In 2015, he moved back to Chicago, where he currently lives and works. In 2016, his participation in a historical panel discussion hosted by the University of Chicago was filmed, and is available on YouTube.

== Exhibitions and collections ==
Williams' work has been exhibited extensively nationally and internationally in solo and group exhibitions. His solo exhibitions include shows at Chicago State University, the University of South Carolina, NOA Gallery in Washington, D.C., the American Cultural Center in Dakar, Senegal, and the French Cultural Center in Nairobi, Kenya. His work has also been featured in group exhibitions at several of the world's most esteemed museums, including in the exhibitions Soul of a Nation: Art in the Age of Black Power at the Tate Modern in London, England; The Freedom Principle, which traveled to the Institute of Contemporary Art, Philadelphia as well as the Museum of Contemporary Art, Chicago, and AFRICOBRA in Chicago, a multi-venue exhibition hosted by the South Side Community Art Center, the Reva and David Logan Center for the Arts at the University of Chicago, and the DuSable Museum of African American History. He celebrated his fiftieth year with AfriCOBRA in the collective's anniversary exhibition in the Kavi-Gupta Gallery in Chicago, followed by a follow-on exhibition at the North Miami Museum of Contemporary Art (MOCA) during Art Basel. From the MOCA, the exhibition was invited to show during the 58th Venice Biennale in the Palacio Ca Facannon. Work by Williams is also included in numerous private and institutional collections, including that of the Smart Museum of Art at the University of Chicago, the Brooklyn Museum, the DuSable Museum of African American History, and the Johnson Publishing Company, publishers of the magazines Ebony and Jet.
