= Flowers (Warhol) =

1964–65 series of silkscreen paintings by Andy Warhol

- Artist: Andy Warhol
- Year: 1964
- Medium: Acrylic, silkscreen ink on canvas
- Movement: Pop Art

Flowers is a series of silkscreen paintings by American artist Andy Warhol between 1964 and 1965. Based on a photograph of hibiscus blossoms published in Modern Photography magazine, the works feature brightly colored, flatly rendered flowers set against a dark, grassy ground. First exhibited at the Leo Castelli Gallery in New York in November 1964, Flowers became one of Warhol's most recognizable bodies of work and a key example of his use of repetition, appropriation, and mechanical reproduction in Pop art.

For his 1965 exhibition at the Ileana Sonnabend Gallery in Paris, Warhol created a second series of smaller Flowers. He later produced a Flowers portfolio in 1970 featuring varied silkscreen compositions, and in 1974 created Hand Colored Flowers, a portfolio of ten hand-colored screen prints.

== Production ==
=== 1964 flowers ===
Warhol was presented with a copy of Modern Photography magazine by his friend Henry Geldzahler, the curator of American art at the Metropolitan Museum of Art. Warhol noticed a spread of photographs of hibiscus flowers printed in a range of hues that editor Patricia Caulfield had taken "to illustrate an article on a Kodak color processor for amateurs. The flowers in Caulfield's picture are pink, red, and yellow, and shown against foliage that more nearly resembles a coniferous-type shrub than hibiscus leaves." These images served as inspiration for Warhol's Flowers paintings for his exhibition at the Leo Castelli Gallery in New York in November 1964.

Two pink hibiscus blossoms

Warhol chose a photograph that he had enlarged and photocopied to remove color from it. All that was left were silhouettes of the flowers and outlines of the pistils. To create a square shape, the image was cropped to show four flowers. Next, the blossoms were stenciled out in different proportions, starting with 48-inch squares. Warhol used a brush or spray paint to color the outlined shapes, some of which were painted with Day-Glo neon paint, and the rest were colored green. Lastly, a black silkscreen was applied to the background image, which displayed the pistils inside the blooms and the grass blades outside.

=== 1965 flowers ===
In 1965, Warhol produced a second series of Flowers for his show at the Ileana Sonnabend Gallery in Paris. This series of the quadratic works was smaller in scale—22, 14, 8, and 5 inches—and had a black and white background. In his memoir Popism, Warhol stated: "In France they weren't interested in new art; they'd gone back to liking the Impressionists mostly. That’s what made me decide to send them the Flowers; I figured they like that."

== Critical reception ==
Art critic Thomas B. Hess, writing in ARTnews, praised Warhol as "the brightest of Pop artists" and argued that the Flowers paintings were deliberately emptied of meaning through mechanical reproduction and garish color. Describing them as "successfully drained of any interest beyond the conceptual apparatus a spectator chooses to poke at," he suggested that Warhol embraced the criticism that modern art resembled wallpaper, reducing the floral motif to a decorative surface whose significance depended on the viewer.

Art critic Lucy R. Lippard of Art International found the Flowers series a refreshing departure from Warhol's gory theme of his Death and Disaster series. Lippard likened the works to "winsomely child-like blobs of brilliant solid color, silhouetted against a green and black overall grass pattern with an electric effect." She added, "In spite of the infinite repetition, there is considerable difference in color combination, placement and edge. The direct and cheerful naiveté is augmented by the fact that the technique also recalls an amateur woodcut or linoleum block in its scratchy matter-of-factness and occasional off-registration. Seen up close, the pictures look like 'genuiné brushtroke' reproductions, echoing Warhol's principles of mass-production."

Art historian Nina Zimmer noted that "Warhol reduced and radicalised his Flowers to such an extent that the banal subject matter was now transformed into a powerful pictorial concept. The directionless format contributed to this: the pictures can be read in all directions; like an abstract painting, top and bottom, left and right, have been revoked."

== Lawsuit ==
Warhol was sued by Patricia Caulfield, the executive editor of Modern Photography at the time, for reproducing a photograph she had created of hibiscus flowers. The June 1964 issue featured an article with a photograph of a flower arrangement she had taken in Barbados. Soon after, Warhol contacted the magazine to express his desire to purchase the image, but he thought it was too expensive. He then took the photo out of the magazine, cropped it, and used it to create silkscreen paintings for his Flowers series, according to the lawsuit that Caulfield filed in November 1966. Warhol and Caulfield reached a settlement for him to give her two new Flowers paintings, and he agreed to give her 25% of the profits from the portfolio of Flowers prints.

== Prints ==
In 1970, Warhol created a Flowers portfolio, which had 10 prints with varied silkscreen compositions.

In 1974, Warhol produced Hand Colored Flowers, a set of 10 hand-colored screen prints co-published by Multiples, Inc. and Castelli Graphics.

== Art market ==
The large Flower paintings were initially sold for $6,000 at the Leo Castelli Gallery in New York and the Jerrold Morris International Gallery in Toronto. In October 1973, Flowers sold for $135,000 at Sotheby Parke Bernet in New York, setting a record at the time for a Warhol painting. Since then, several paintings have been offered at auction.

=== List of Flowers sold at auction for over $2 million ===
Year	Work	Size	Description	Auction house	Price
2001	Large Flowers (1964)		Two blossoms, one red and one pink	Christie's, New York	$8.4 million
2002	Four-foot Flowers (1965)	48 x 48 in.	Four Blossoms, one green, pink, orange, and yellow against a black-and-whit background	Christie's, New York	$3.7 million
2004	Large Flowers (1964)	82 x 162 in.	Two blossoms, one red and one orange against a black-and-whit background	Christie's, New York	$6.7 million
2005	Flowers (1965)	81¾ x 140½ in.	Two blossoms, one blue and one red against a black-and-green background	Christie's, New York	$7.9 million
2007	Four-Foot Flowers (1964)	48 x 48¼ in.	Four Blossoms, one white, one purple, and two blue against a black-and-green background	Christie's, London	£2.1 million
2013	Flowers (1964)	24 x 24 in. (each)	Four paintings with four blossoms on each against a black-and-green background	Christie's, New York	$8.4 million
2014	Flowers (1964)	48 x 48 in.	One orange, one red, and two purple blossoms against a black-and-green background	Phillips, New York	$10.3 million
2018	16 Flowers (1965)	8 x 8 in. (each)	Sixteen 8-by-8-inch paintings against a black-and-white background	Phillips, New York	$5.4 million
2018	Flowers (1964)	24 x 24 in.	Four Blossoms, one red, one pink, and two orange against a black-and-green background	Christie's, New York	$2.1 million
2019	9 Flowers (1965)	8 x 8 in. (each)	Nine 8-inch-square paintings against a black-and-white background	Phillips, New York	$2.6 million
2019	Flowers (1964)	14 x 14 in.	Four red blossoms against a black-and-green background	Phillips, Hong Kong	$7.5 million
2019	Flowers (1965)	24 x 24 in.	Four Blossoms, one yellow, one red, and two orange against a black-and-white background	Christie's, New York	$2.4 million
2020	Flowers (1964)	24 x 24 in.	One orange, one blue, and two purple blossoms against a black-and-green background	Christie's, London	£2.1 million (US$2.7 million)
2022	Flowers (1964)	81 3/4 x 81 1/2 in.	Four white blossoms against a black-and-green background	Christie's, New York	$15.8 million
2023	Flowers (1964)	48 x 48 in.	Four blossoms, one orange, one red, and two purple against a black-and-green background	Phillips, New York	$9.3 million
2023	Flowers (1964)	24 x 24 in.	Four yellow blossoms against a black-and-green background	Christie's, New York	$3.4 million
2024	Flowers (1965)	82 x 82 in.	Two yellow blossoms against a black-and-green background	Christie's, Hong Kong	HK$66.6 million (US$8.5 million)
2024	Late Four-Foot Flowers (1967)	48 x 48 in.	Four blossoms, one pink, one purple, and two orange against a black-and-green background	Sotheby's, New York	$11.2 million
2024	Flowers (1964)	82 x 82 in.	Four blossoms, one red and three orange against a black-and-green background	Christie's, New York	$35.5 million
2025	Flowers (1964)	24 x 24 in.	Four blossoms, one red, one purple, and two orange against a black-and-green background	Sotheby's, New York	$4.1 million
2026	Flowers (1964)	24 x 24 in.	Four blossoms, one orange, one peach, and two pink against a black-and-green background	Sotheby's, New YoRk	$6.3 million
2026	Flowers (1964)	24 x 24 in.	Four blue blossoms against a black-and-green background	Sotheby's, New York	$6.1 million
2026	Flowers (1964)	48 x 48 in.	Four blossoms, one red, yellow, blue, and purple against a black-and-white background	Sotheby's, New York	$18.2 million
