= Jae Jarrell =

American artist (born 1935)

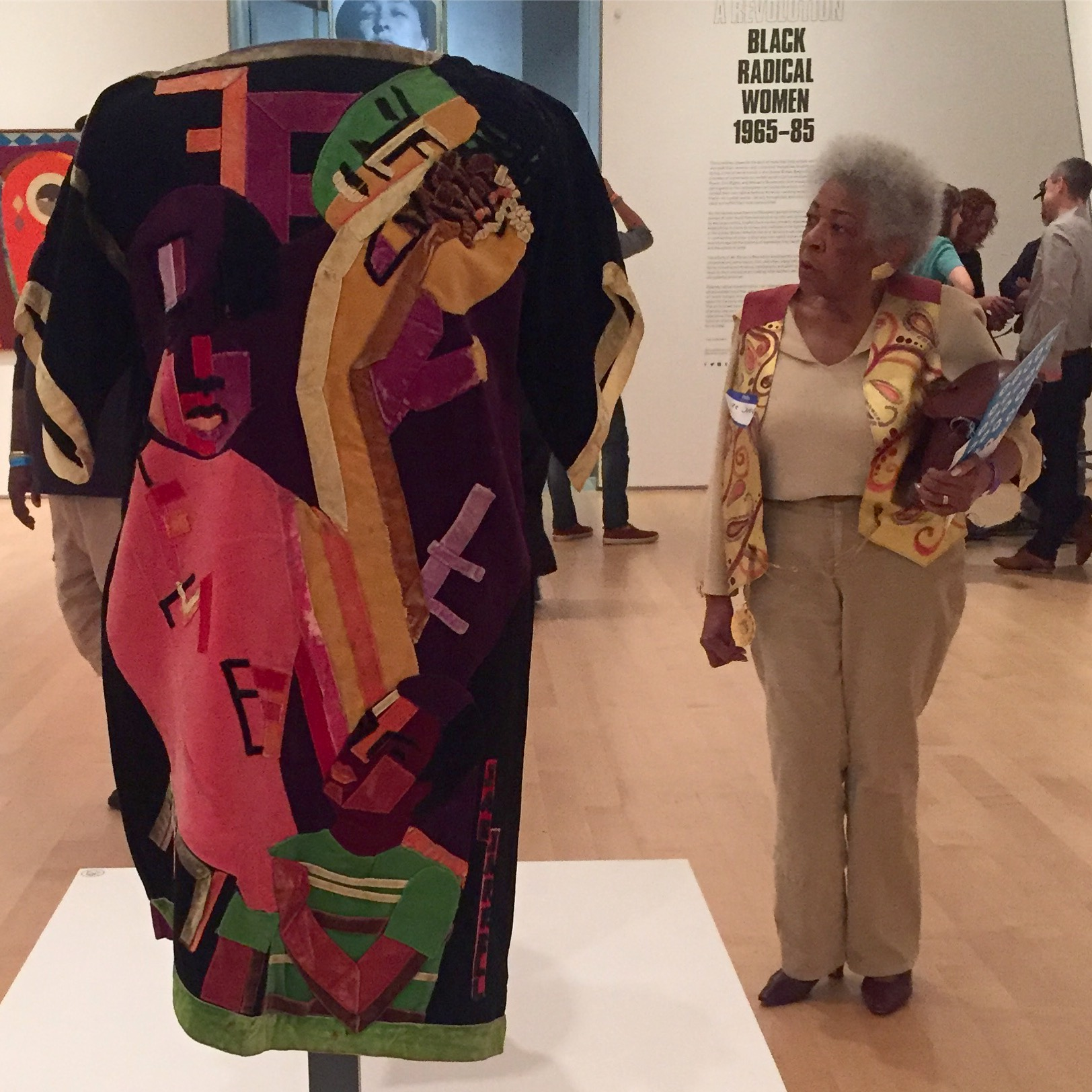
- Born: Elaine Annette Johnson; 1935 (age 90–91)
- Other name: Jae
- Education: Bowling Green State University; School of the Art Institute of Chicago
- Occupations: Clothing designer Artist
- Spouse: Wadsworth Jarrell (m. 1967)
- Children: 2

Elaine "Jae" Jarrell (born Elaine Annette Johnson, 1937) is an American artist and fashion designer associated with the Black Arts Movement of the 1960s. She is a co-founder of AfriCOBRA, an artist collective.

== Early life and education ==
Jarrell was raised in the Glenville neighborhood of Cleveland, Ohio, United States. She was exposed to fabrics and sewing through her grandparents. Her uncle owned a haberdashery that sold fabric and sewing supplies, which introduced her to fashion and business. Additionally, her mother introduced her to vintage shops and clothing construction. Reflecting on these experiences in a conversation with Rose Bouthillier, Jarrell stated:

"And so I always thought of making clothes in order to have something unique, and later I learned to sew very well and made it my business to always make my garments. And I also have a love for vintage, knowing that it has secrets of the past that I can unfold."

Jarrell attended Bowling Green State University in northwest Ohio before enrolling at the School of the Art Institute of Chicago (SAIC). She studied at SAIC during the 1950s and 1960s, alongside Wadsworth Jarrell, who later became her husband. They met in 1963, shortly after she opened a vintage boutique.

== Career ==
=== Chicago ===
In her early years in Chicago, Jarrell worked briefly at Motorola. At the suggestion of a colleague, she began using the professional name "Jae", derived from her given names. She later opened a store near Hyde Park named "Jae of Hyde Park".

Chicago was also where Jae and Wadsworth contributed to the formation of AfriCOBRA. In an interview, Jarrell noted that the city’s cultural environment influenced the group’s development.

In 1967, Jae married Wadsworth Jarrell. On January 7, 1968, she gave birth to their first child, Wadsworth Jr. After the birth of their second child, Jennifer, the Jarrells relocated to New York.

Following her involvement with AfriCOBRA in Chicago, Jarrell moved to Washington D.C., where she completed her BFA and graduate work at Howard University.

=== AfriCOBRA ===
Jeff Donaldson, Wadsworth Jarrell, Jae Jarrell, Barbara Jones-Hogu, and Gerald Williams met in Wadsworth's studio on the South Side of Chicago and formed AfriCOBRA in 1968. Jarrell created much of her art as a member of AfriCOBRA, an African American artist collective that combined African artistic styles with political themes. It was formed after the dissolution of the Coalition of Black Revolutionary Artists (COBRA) and focused on Black pride and empowerment. A manifesto written by founding member Jeff Donaldson outlined the group's principles. Donaldson categorized the members' artistic production into three groups:

1. Definition—images that deal with the past.
2. Identification—images that relate to the present.
3. Direction—images that look into the future.

The manifesto also detailed specific aesthetic qualities valued by the collective:

1. Expressive Awesomeness—the feeling "that one experiences in African art and life in the U.S.A.";
2. Symmetry and Rhythm—"repetition with change, based on African music and African movement";
3. Mimesis—"the plus and the minus, the abstract and the concrete";
4. Organic looking—"We want the work to look like the creator made it through us";
5. Shine—"We want the things to shine, to have the rich luster of a just-washed 'fro, of spit-shined shoes, of de-ashened elbows and knees and noses";
6. Color—"color that shines, color that is free of rules and regulations…. Color that is expressively awesome".

Jarrell stated that the manifesto influenced the direction of her work. In an interview with the Never the Same Foundation, she described the collective's aim to create a supportive community:

"We made an effort to raise a consciousness. In our hearts, when we put this all together, we thought it was going to be an explosion of positive imagery, and things that gave kids direction, and knowing some of our leaders now portrayed in a fresh way. I saw a result of our raising the consciousness, particularly about our history."

Jarrell explained that while AfriCOBRA was sometimes associated with activist groups like the Black Panthers, she drew on history to highlight African empowerment rather than focusing on segregation.

Jarrell produced garments for AfriCOBRA using clothing to explore themes of revolution and identity. Her process involved creating textile designs on leather or suede, which she modified through tie-dye, screen printing, hand painting, and appliqué. Notable works from this period include the Revolutionary Suit (1968), Ebony Family (1968), and Urban Wall Suit (1969).

The Revolutionary Suit (1968) is a two-piece suit featuring a tweed, collarless jacket and a skirt. The ensemble incorporates a colorful, faux bandolier that contrasts with the suit's salt-and-pepper fabric. Jet magazine commented on the suit's bandolier design, criticizing the mainstream fashion industry for appropriating a symbol of protest as a trendy accessory.

Jarrell's Ebony Family (1968) addressed the theme of the Black Family, a central tenet of AfriCOBRA. The suit utilizes the group's "Cool-ade" [sic] color palette—bright orange, cherry red, lemon yellow, lime green, and grape purple. Constructed in the form of a dashiki, the suit depicts a family using forms reminiscent of African masks.

The Urban Wall Suit (1969) was inspired by graffiti and concert posters in Chicago neighborhoods. Jarrell incorporated the AfriCOBRA principle of combining images with text, turning the suit into a representation of community message boards. The fabric features images of posters with phrases such as "Vote Democrat" and graffiti reading "Black Princess" and "Miss Attitude." Jarrell used fabric scraps from her store to create a patchwork effect resembling bricks, with velvet ribbon serving as the mortar.

Members of AfriCOBRA referred to the collective as a "family" presenting their work as a unified expression of shared values. Scholar Rebecca Zorach notes that the group aimed to reject racialized stereotypes regarding the black family structure. Although the Jarrells eventually left the coalition, Jae Jarrell has stated that the collective continues to influence her work.

In an interview with Rebecca Zorach, Jarrell explained her relationship with the group:

"It's like a family, you know, you could never divorce yourself from the family. You can only grow, and you could always understand those who have not moved in the same kind of direction you have, but there's a language you have, and an eye contact and a trust and a respect. It goes a long way."

=== Later work ===
In recent years, Jarrell has shifted focus from design to sculpting and constructing furniture. Works displayed in the How to Remain Human exhibition at the Museum of Contemporary Art Cleveland include Maasai Collar Vest (2015), Shields and Candelabra Vest (2015), and Jazz Scramble Jacket (2015). The Maasai Collar Vest (2015) references the garments and jewelry of the Maasai people. Shields and Candelabra Vest (2015) incorporates inverted cactus plants as frames for African shields. In Jazz Scrabble Jacket (2015), Jarrell combines references to jazz and blues music with imagery from the board game Scrabble, intersecting the names of musicians to explore the influence of music on African American history and culture.

== Exhibitions ==
Jarrell's work has appeared in exhibitions including the Brooklyn Museum of Art's 2014 exhibition Witness: Art and Civil Rights in the Sixties and the Museum of Contemporary Art Cleveland's 2015 exhibition How to Remain Human. Her work was also featured in the 2015 exhibit The Freedom Principle: Experiments in Art and Music, 1965 to Now at the Museum of Contemporary Art Chicago (MCA). In 2019, her clothing designs were featured in the exhibition Soul of a Nation at The Broad in Los Angeles.

Her garments are held in private collections and in the permanent collection of the Brooklyn Museum of Art.
