= AfriCOBRA =

Artist collective

AfriCOBRA (the African Commune of Bad Relevant Artists) is an African-American artists' collective formed in Chicago, Illinois, in 1968. The group was founded by Jeff Donaldson, Wadsworth Jarrell, Jae Jarrell, Barbara Jones-Hogu, Nelson Stevens, and Gerald Williams.

== History ==
AfriCOBRA was founded on the South Side of Chicago by a group of artists intent on defining a "black aesthetic." AfriCOBRA artists were associated with the Black Arts Movement in America, a movement that began in the mid-1960s and that celebrated culturally-specific expressions of the contemporary Black community in the realms of literature, theater, dance and the visual arts. The group operated on the principles of social responsibility, artistic excellence, local artistic involvement and lastly, the promotion of pride in Black self-identity.

Beginning in 1968, AfriCOBRA members met regularly on the South Side of Chicago at the home and studio of Wadsworth and Jae Jarrell where they discussed ways that their art could embody a "Black aesthetic," based on an agreed upon aesthetic creed. The group initially started out as COBRA, the Commune of Bad Relevant Artists. The group's sole purpose was emphasizing self determination and universal Black liberation. Cobra used current events and the political climate as subject for their art, for the purpose of bringing awareness.

After the 1968 Chicago Democratic Convention, the group responded with a series of paintings meant to represent the Black Family. The paintings functioned as a call to awareness of racial violence in America, which had been demonstrated on national television on August 28, 1968, where demonstrators at the convention were beaten and brutalized by police. Every member of Cobra contributed an image to the theme.

In 1969, the group changed their name to AfriCOBRA (the African Commune of Bad Relevant Artists). Choosing to focus more on the Diaspora of people of African descent, the group embraced rising Afrocentric ideology. The name change was followed by the addition of new artists, including Napoleon Jones-Henderson, Nelson Stevens, Sherman Beck, Frank Smith, and Carolyn Lawrence.

In 1970, the group participated in an exhibition titled Ten in Search of a Nation at the Studio Museum of Harlem. This exhibition helped to introduce AfriCOBRA to an audience outside of Chicago. The work was not for sale, as its sole function was that of education. The group maintained that they did not want to promote individual gain from the images. The group returned to the Studio Museum in Harlem for the AfriCOBRA II show in the fall of 1971. The group continued to participate in exhibitions at historically African American colleges throughout the 1970s.

During the 1970s, many artists associated with AfriCOBRA traveled back to Africa to study African art, considering African art to be essential to their work as AfriCOBRA artists. They traveled back to Africa during a time when many African countries were gaining independence from colonial rule. Additionally, many of these countries were gaining stature at American universities, many of which were beginning to create their African Studies programs. These traveling individuals became known as "returnee" artists, and many pursued degrees in African art. Many of them are still important scholars of African and African American art today.

In 1977, AfriCOBRA was invited to FESTAC'77, the Second World Black and African Festival of Arts and Culture in Lagos, Nigeria. The festival saw over 15,000 artists from around the world in attendance. The event was held from January 15 through February 12, 1977, and all people of African descent were invited. They were organized by geographical zones. Jeff Donaldson was placed in charge of the North American artists delegation, while Jae Jarrell was a chair on the FESTAC Committee of Creative Modern Black and African Dress.

After FESTAC'77, AfriCOBRA once again changed its name, AfriCOBRA to Africobra/Farafindugu. Farafindugu, a Malinke word, was interpreted to mean the "complex concept of blackness, brother-hood, and black land," as said by Farafindugu artist Frank Smith.

=== Founding members ===
AfriCOBRA's founding members were first associated with the Organization of Black American Culture (OBAC), established in 1967. This group, formed in Chicago to encourage education and performance amongst the city's African American population, was responsible for the famous Wall of Respect. The wall consisted of a series of portraits dedicated to individuals considered heroes and heroines of African-American history. The Wall of Respect was ultimately destroyed in a fire in 1971. However, it served as an inspiration for further artistic representation of the African American experience.

Jeff Donaldson and Wadsworth Jarrell, two OBAC artists who had contributed to the Wall of Respect, began exploring whether or not a Black art movement could be started on the basis of a common aesthetic creed. After a series of meetings, Jeff Donaldson, Wadsworth Jarrell, Jae Jarrell, Barabara Jones-Hogu, and Gerald Williams would come together to form the group known as COBRA, the Commune of Bad Relevant Artists. It was not until a few years later that the group changed their name to AfriCOBRA.

== Artistry and influence ==
AfriCOBRA wanted to communicate the Black aesthetic as a new sense of purpose; the Black aesthetic was not simply art, but a powerful image. The image was a representation of Black pride, Black self-determination, and a support of all Black people of the Diaspora. The group had a main purpose of celebrating African identity and calling awareness to the political struggles through the representation of Black Visual Culture. AfriCOBRA's work incorporated elements of free jazz, vibrant, "kool-aid" colors, and images representing spiritual identity. Their images were to perform a function that Black people could directly relate to, emphasizing education and awareness of the conditions of Black people.

In an interview celebrating the 50th anniversary of the Civil Rights Act of 1964, Teresa A. Carbone (the Curator of American Art at the Brooklyn Museum) stated, "It's difficult to draw a one-to-one correspondence between a work and an immediate social effect, but graphics from the Chicago artist collective AfriCOBRA, [African Commune of Bad Relevant Artists] really did help reshape the mindset of black communities."

AfriCOBRA works to make African-American art a community effort. Much of the visual aesthetic of these works are focused on social, political, and economical conditions related to Black Americans. They created a manifesto entitled "Ten in Search of a Nation" in 1969.

One of the most notable works was the commemoration of black revolutionaries in the Wall of Respect that was painted by the members of the Organization of Black American Culture (OBAC). Jeff Donaldson, Wadsworth Jarrell, Gerald Williams, and Barbara Jones-Hogu were members originally who later on formed AfriCOBRA, as well as Sylvia Abernathy, Myrna Weaver and others. This wall also became what Barbara Jones-Hogu described as "a visual symbol of Black nationalism and liberation."

AfriCOBRA was more than a collection of artists; it was a passionate call for freedom founded on a set of philosophical and aesthetic principles. In the struggle for liberation and equality within the African-American community, AfriCOBRA represented these principles through the medium of art.

Barbara Jones-Hogu characterized the artistic expression of the AfriCOBRA movement by saying: "[Our art] must communicate to its viewer a statement of truth, of action, of education, of conditions and a state of being to our people. We wanted to speak to them and for them, by having our common thoughts, feelings, trials and tribulations express our total existence as a people.

Later wrote in Afri-COBRA III Exhibition catalog, 1973 "The History, Philosophy, and Aesthetics of Afri-COBRA" which contained several lists of directives, philosophical concepts, aesthetic principles, all of which is Jones-Hogu's interpretation of the statues that the group followed. The visual statements are described as humanistic in order to stress "strength, straight forwardness, profoundness, and proudness," as well as providing a direct statement about issues of that time. The philosophical concepts described with bolded words stating images, "identification", "programmatic", "modes of expression", and "expressive awesomeness". Aesthetic principles also are described the same with "free symmetry", "mimesis at mid-point", "visibility", "luminosity", and "color", more specifically "Cool-ade color" which is deeply associated with AfriCOBRA's art and era.

== See also ==
- Jeff Donaldson
- Frank Smith
- Jae Jarrell
- Wadsworth Jarrell
- Napoleon Jones-Henderson
- Barbara Jones-Hogu
- Gerald Williams
- Sherman Beck

== Selected works ==
- Wall of Respect, 1967
- Gerald Williams, "Nation Time", 1969
- Gerald Williams, "Wake Up", 1971
- Barbara Jones-Hogu, "Unite", 1971
- Wadsworth Jarrell, "Liberation Soldiers", 1972
