= Jeff Donaldson (artist) =

American artist

- Born: Jeffrey Richardson Donaldson; 15 December 1932; Pine Bluff, Arkansas, US
- Died: 29 February 2004 (aged 71); Washington, DC, US
- Education: University of Arkansas at Pine Bluff, IIT Institute of Design, Northwestern University
- Movement: Black Arts Movement

Jeff Donaldson (1932 – 2004) was a visual artist whose work helped define the Black Arts Movement of the 1960s and 1970s. Donaldson, co-founder of AfriCOBRA and contributor to the momentous Wall of Respect, was a pioneer in African-American personal and academic achievement. His art work is known for creating alternative black iconography connected to Africa and rooted in struggle, in order to replace the history of demeaning stereotypes found in mainstream white culture.

In the midst of the racial and cultural turmoil of the 1960s, a group of African-American artists endeavored to relate its artwork to the black masses. Aiming to use art for social impact, artists such as Donaldson strived to create an "art for the people"—an art form that was recognizable by and directed toward the common black folk, rather than a group of well-educated elite. Within his works and collaborative efforts, Donaldson essentially became the father of a new, uniting aesthetic—transAfricanism.

Within AfriCOBRA, it was Donaldson's idea to synthesize an all-encompassing transnational aesthetic—to, in effect, collaborate internationally to unify the then-fragmented concept of black art. The result of such unification would usher in a deeper understanding on the behalf of the African diasporic masses concerning its identity as a people. Having been displaced from their native lands and transplanted into foreign locations, members of the African diaspora grasped onto the only thing that remained of their lost identity—the fact that they descended from Africa, and that they were removed thence. Thus, ironically, the very factor which disowned the African diasporic peoples of their past identities became the fabric of their new self-concepts. The uniting efforts of Donaldson and AfriCOBRA not only furthered this sense of transnational identity among the diaspora, but gave it visibility, making it "official", in a way. As Donaldson described, "One rarely sees a black human-interest story [in the newspaper]" and of television, "not a single one of the new programs celebrates the beauty and dignity of black life style." Thus, he endeavored to put the true nature of blacks into the forefront—to give it an up-front face and therefore a recognized existence.

== Biography ==
Jeffrey Richardson Donaldson was born on 15 December 1932 in Pine Bluff, Arkansas to Clementine Frances Richardson Donaldson and Sidney Frank Donaldson Sr. He attended Merrill High School in Pine Bluff. He received a B.A. in Studio Art from the University of Arkansas at Pine Bluff in 1954, the college's first studio art major. He worked for a year at Lanier High School, establishing an arts program for black students then was drafted into the U.S. Army for service. Donaldson went on to complete his M.F.A. at the Institute of Design of the Illinois Institute of Technology of Chicago in 1963. In 1974, Donaldson earned the degree of PhD from Northwestern University, becoming the first African American to do so in the nation.

As the chairman of Howard University beginning in 1970, Donaldson used his influence to revolutionize the curricula of the African and African-American art history majors. He broadened the narrowly defined concept of art to include its other, less mainstream facets, causing its most dedicated pupils to view it with a new respect and significance. Art came to be interpreted by these students as something that could take multiple and unique forms, as well as something that carried with it a social meaning. Thanks to his influence, the art program at Howard University become world-renowned.

Donaldson died in Washington DC on February 29, 2004.

His paper are in the Archives of American Art. His work is in the collection of the Smithsonian American Art Museum. In 2018 a retrospective entitled Jeff Donaldson: Dig was exhibited at the Everson Museum of Art. It traveled to the Akron Art Museum in 2019. Donaldson's work was included in the 2025 exhibition Photography and the Black Arts Movement, 1955–1985 at the National Gallery of Art.
