= Mahogany (disambiguation) =

Mahogany refers to dark-colored wood from various types of tree.

Mahogany may also refer to:

== Botany and forestry ==
- Three species in the genus Swietenia:
  - Swietenia macrophylla
  - Swietenia mahagoni
  - Swietenia humilis
- Eastern Australian trees in the genus Karrabina
- African Mahogany:
  - Afzelia, genus in the family Fabaceae
  - Khaya, genus in the family Meliaceae
- Blue Mountains mahogany, Eucalyptus notabilis
- Chinese mahogany, Toona sinensis
- Dundas mahogany, Eucalyptus brockwayi
- Indian mahogany, Toona ciliata
- Indonesian mahogany, Toona sureni
- Mountain mahogany:
  - species of trees in the genus Cercocarpus
  - Eucalyptus notabilis
- Natal mahogany, Trichilia emetica
- Philippine mahogany:
  - Shorea in the dipterocarp family Dipterocarpaceae
  - Toona calantas and other species in the mahogany family Meliaceae
- Red mahogany:
  - Eucalyptus pellita
  - Eucalyptus resinifera
  - Eucalyptus scias, large-fruited red mahogany
- Southern mahogany, Eucalyptus botryoides
- Swamp mahogany:
  - Lophostemon suaveolens, native to Australia and New Guinea
  - Eucalyptus robusta
- Swan River mahogany, Eucalyptus marginata, also called jarrah
- Thick-leafed mahogany, Eucalyptus carnea
- White mahogany:
  - Eucalyptus acmenoides
  - Eucalyptus apothalassica
  - Eucalyptus psammitica
  - Eucalyptus tenuipes, narrow-leaved white mahogany
  - Eucalyptus umbra, broad-leaved white mahogany

== Places ==
- Mahogany Mountains, a mountain range on the Nevada-Utah border
- Mahogany Mountain, an ancient volcano on the border between Oregon and Idaho
- Mahogany Mountain (Utah), in the Wasatch Range
- Mahogany Hills, a mountain range in Nevada
- Mahogany, Calgary, a neighbourhood in Alberta, Canada
- Mahogany Bluff, Graham Land, Antarctica

== People ==
- Christian Mahogany (born 2000), American football player
- Honey Mahogany (born 1983), Ethiopian-American former drag queen and politician
- Kevin Mahogany (1958–2017), American jazz vocalist

== Arts and entertainment ==
- Mahogany (band), a band from Brooklyn, New York, USA
- Mahogany (film), starring Diana Ross
- Mahogany (soundtrack), to the film
- "Mahogany", a song by Lil Wayne from the album Funeral

== Other ==
- Mahogany (color), inspired by the wood
- Mahogany (drink), a blend of gin and treacle
- Mahogany (email client), an OpenSource cross-platform e-mail and news client
- Mahogany (horse), Australian racehorse
- USS Mahogany, a net-laying ship in World War II
- Mahogany Avenue, a road in Tagaytay, Cavite, Philippines
- Mahogany Research Project, initiative by Shell Oil to procure oil in Colorado, USA

== See also ==
- Mahagonny, a fictional city in:
  - Mahagonny-Songspiel, a 1927 musical-theatrical piece by Kurt Weill and Bertolt Brecht
  - Rise and Fall of the City of Mahagonny, a 1930 opera by Kurt Weill and Bertolt Brecht
- MahoganyBooks, an independent bookstore chain
- Mahogany Ship, possibly mythical wrecked ship in south-western Victoria, Australia
