= Peter Wayne Lewis =

Jamaican-American painter (born 1953)

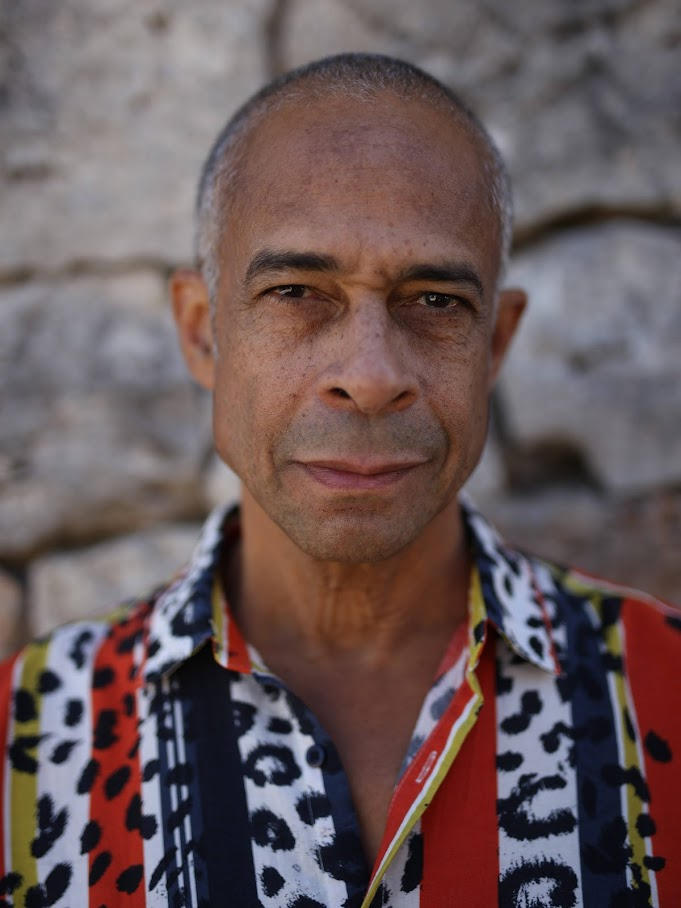
- Born: 1953 (age 72–73); Kingston, Jamaica

Peter Wayne Lewis (born 1953) is a Jamaican-American contemporary artist known for his large-scale abstract paintings, many of which are combined to form floor-to-ceiling works. Lewis has exhibited internationally, presenting solo shows in Europe, North America, Asia, and most frequently in China.

== Series development and exhibitions ==
Lewis's first exhibition of large paintings in a grid format (a "series"), Beijing Booster Griot, opened at the Sunshine International Art Museum in the Songzhuang Art Colony in Beijing, China, in 2008. Beijing Booster Griot appeared again in a solo exhibition in 2015 at the Museum of Contemporary Art in North Miami, along with additional paintings from the Booster series.

From January to March 2016, the UCCA Center for Contemporary Art in Beijing presented two parallel exhibitions showcasing the works of Lewis and Frederick J. Brown (1945–2012), "two artists of the African diaspora whose expressive paintings draw inspiration from their respective cultural backgrounds and shared interest in jazz and spirituality." In 1988, Brown had become the first American artist to display his work at the National Museum of China. Along with Brown's work, Lewis exhibited two major suites, each comprising fifteen paintings. "There is an idea in string theory that all matter exists as vibrating strings moving in multiple dimensions. This idea links physics to my great love, music. The vibration of the strings creates harmony – the universe is a symphony of color and light and different time signatures," Lewis said. Titled Monk Time Suite (2013) and Buddha Plays Monk (2012–2015), the two suites were painted in China. The exhibition, marking the public debut of these works, made use of the high walls of UCCA's nave to display the groupings in large grids. The Buddha Plays Monk suite consisted of 15 paintings, each measuring 42 in × 36 in (107 cm × 91 cm), arranged in a three-by-five grid. A group of six paintings titled False Vacuum (2015), inspired by the ideas of MIT physicist Alan Guth, was also displayed.

In 2019, Lewis presented the Beijing Booster series again as a solo exhibition at The Delaware Contemporary. The series Bending Time Paintings was first exhibited in a solo show at Red Gate Gallery in Beijing in 2019. He presented an online exhibition of various paintings at Skoto Gallery in New York City in 2021.

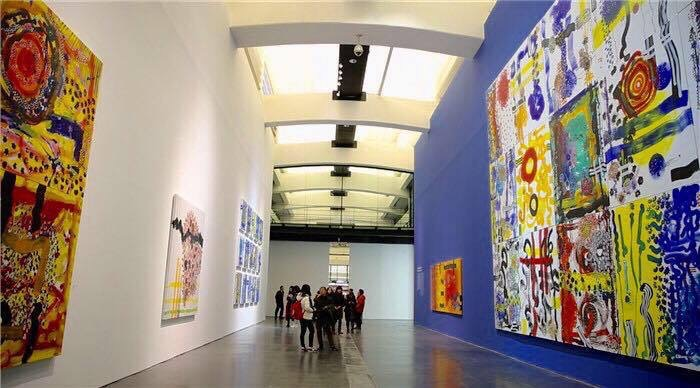
Buddha Plays Monk and Monk Time Suite, UCCA, 2016, Beijing, China

His next series, Buoyancy, debuted at Skoto Gallery in early 2023. The series was prompted by a trans-Atlantic voyage from Florida to Venice, Italy, in 2022—an opposite-direction Middle Passage his ancestors would have made between Africa and Jamaica. Lewis stated: "This experience transformed my sensibilities and humanness. The 'Buoyancy' paintings, as all of my work, deal with stasis, trying to find some sort of balance and grounding. Being an immigrant from Kingston, Jamaica and migrating to the USA in 1962 forever changed me and my sense of place and meaning. Balancing through the physics of being buoyant on a vessel across an aqueous body, as well as moving through the cosmos in this world never escapes me."

== Art career ==
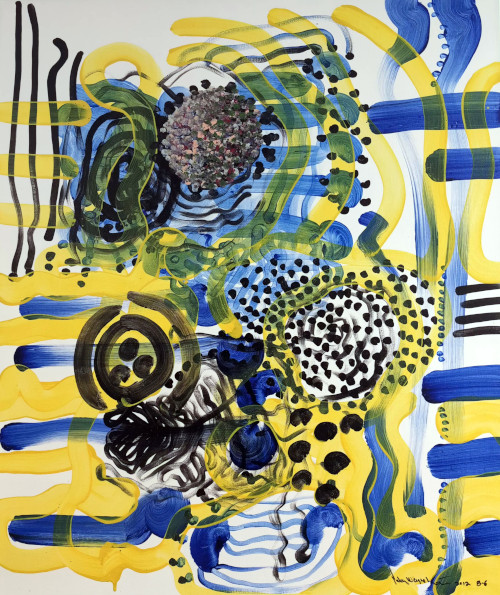
Buddha Plays Monk 6 (single) by Peter Wayne Lewis, 2012

In 1991, Lewis met Norman Parish, owner of a gallery for Black artists in Georgetown, Washington, D.C., who subsequently represented him. Shortly after Lewis moved to the East Coast in early 1992, he was introduced to artist Lorenzo Pace. Pace introduced him to an array of artists and jazz musicians in the Bowery and the New York City area, including poet Amiri Baraka.

Later in 1992, he became the artist-in-residence in Viechtach, Bavaria, Germany, where he produced 70 works in two months for an exhibition at the Kunsthaus Ostbayern. In 1993, he participated in his first exhibition in New York City at the Stephen Rosenberg Gallery.

In 1995, Lewis produced three solo exhibitions featuring his Black and Blue Swan Suites. The first, titled Blue Swan Suite, was held at Rosenberg + Kaufman Fine Art and marked his first solo exhibition in New York City. The second, Blue & Black Swan Series, was at the Frederick Spratt Gallery in San Jose, California. The third, Peter Wayne Lewis: Paintings, was mounted at the Parish Gallery in Georgetown. In addition, the Black Swan Suite was included in the Smithsonian Institution Traveling Exhibition Caribbean Visions, curated by Samella Lewis.

In 2000, his exhibition at Rosenberg + Kaufman Fine Art featured his new Fields Series. His next body of work, Strings, was based on string theory and jazz. He first exhibited Strings in 2003 in New York City. That same year, he assembled a solo show at the Stella Jones Gallery in New Orleans. Lewis was a 2005 artist-in-residence in Eschlkam, Germany, that culminated in the opening of the Kunst Pyramid project Licht und Schatten ("Light and Shadow"), sponsored by the state of Bavaria. Lewis's work appeared again as an invited artist in the Biennial at the National Gallery of Jamaica in 2006.

Lewis's painting Eye of the Magnet was exhibited in the 5th Beijing International Art Biennale in 2012.

In October 2023, his solo exhibition at the B. Sakata Garo gallery in Sacramento, California, included work on canvas as well as scroll paintings executed on rice paper. Lewis was the Kingsley Art Club Speaker Series lecturer that same month.

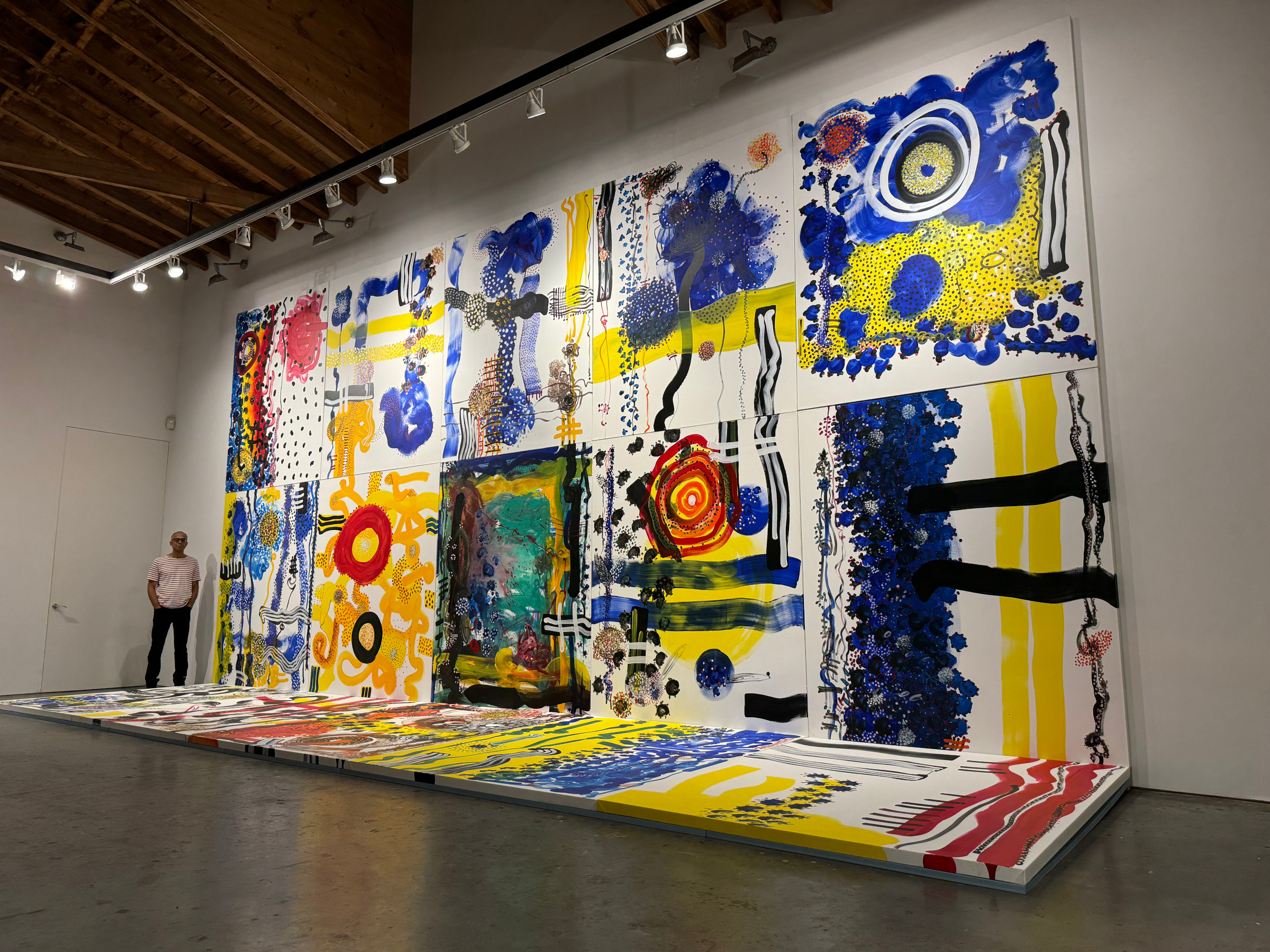
Monk Time Suite at 447 Space, New York City, September 2024

Lewis's solo exhibition Monk at 447 Space in New York City was presented in September–October 2024.

== Life and teaching career ==
Lewis was born in Kingston, Jamaica, and immigrated to Sacramento, California, with his parents in 1962. As a boy in the 1950s, Lewis wanted to be a musician like his father, a jazz pianist. "I grew up listening to music and have a great appreciation for it, but I did not have that gift," he said, and instead channeled his love of music into large-scale abstract paintings. He received his M.A. in Painting from San Jose State University in 1979 and became an American citizen in 1983. He began his teaching career in 1989 as a visiting professor of painting at the San Francisco Art Institute, followed by a guest professorship at San Jose State University. He then became a professor of painting at the University of California, Berkeley in 1991 and moved to the New York City area later that year. He taught at Syracuse University from 1993 until 1995, when he was appointed Professor of Painting at the Massachusetts College of Art & Design (MCAD) in Boston. He was a tenured professor for 25 years, serving as department chairman for Fine Arts 2D from 2006 to 2009. He retired from MCAD as a professor emeritus in 2020.

Lewis has a wide range of influences, from his early attraction to Japanese art to his lifelong interest in music and the legacy of his father, a professional musician who played jazz piano and organ. Later in his career, he became interested in theoretical cosmology and quantum physics (especially string theory), concepts that pushed his work into new directions in the Strings series.

== Selected solo exhibitions ==
- 1984: Paintings, Triton Museum of Art, Santa Clara, California
- 1986: Paintings, San Jose Museum of Art, San Jose, California
- 1987: Recent Abstract Images, Monterey Peninsula Museum of Art, Monterey, California
- 1990: Works on Paper, Kunsthaus Ostbayern, Viechtach, Germany
- 1995: Blue and Black Swan Suite Selections, Parish Gallery, Washington, D.C.; Black Swan Suite, Frederick Spratt Gallery, San Jose, California; Blue Swan Suite Paintings, Rosenberg + Kaufman Fine Art, New York City
- 1997: Replicant, Rosenberg + Kaufman Fine Art, New York City
- 2000: Fields, Rosenberg + Kaufman Fine Art, New York City
- 2002: Dream Paintings, Parish Gallery, Washington, D.C. (now part of the Smithsonian Institution)
- 2003: Paintings, Stella Jones Gallery, New Orleans, Louisiana; Strings, Rosenberg + Kaufman Fine Art, New York City
- 2008: Booster Paintings, Galerie Im Cordonhaus, Cham, Germany; Grand: The Booster Paintings, JAYJAY, Sacramento, California
- 2009: Paintings, Promo-Arte, Tokyo, Japan
- 2011: Paintings from Middle Earth Part 2, Matthias Kuper Galleries, Beijing, China; Paintings from Middle Earth Part 1, JAYJAY, Sacramento, California
- 2012: Paintings from Middle Earth Part 3, Promo-Arte, Tokyo, Japan
- 2013: Paintings from Middle Earth 4, Skoto Gallery, New York City; Strings, Matthias Kuper Galleries, Stuttgart, Germany
- 2015: The Booster Paintings, Museum of Contemporary Art, North Miami, Florida; The Brain Paintings, Skoto Gallery, New York City
- 2015/16: Peter Wayne Lewis & Frederick J. Brown, Ullens Center for Contemporary Art (UCCA), Beijing, China
- 2019: The Bending Time Paintings – From Kingston to Beijing, Red Gate Gallery, Beijing, China
- 2019/20: Beijing Booster Paintings, The Delaware Contemporary, Wilmington, Delaware
- 2021: Booster Selection, Skoto Gallery, New York City
- 2023: Buoyancy, Skoto Gallery, New York City; Kingston to Sacramento: a Painter's Journey, B. Sakata Garo Fine Art, Sacramento, California
- 2024: Monk, 447 Space, New York City
- 2025: California Daze Dream, B. Sakata Garo Fine Art, Sacramento, California
- 2026: Fractal Patterns: PETER WAYNE LEWIS, Red Gate Gallery, Beijing, China
- 2026: Peter Wayne Lewis - Visual Unity (online exhibition), John William Gallery, Wilmington, Delaware

== Selected group exhibitions ==
- 1995: Caribbean Visions, curator Dr. Samella Lewis, Smithsonian Institution, Washington, D.C.
- 1997: Seeing Jazz, Smithsonian Institution Traveling Exhibition Service, Washington, D.C.
- 2000: Soon Come: The Art of Contemporary Jamaica, Mid-American Arts Alliance
- 2004: National Biennial, National Gallery of Jamaica, Kingston, Jamaica
- 2006: 30th Anniversary & National Biennial Exhibition, curator Dr. David Boxer, National Gallery of Jamaica
- 2008: Inaugural Exhibition, international curator Peter Wayne Lewis, Sunshine International Art Museum, Beijing, China
- 2012: 5th Beijing International Art Biennale, National Museum of China, Beijing
- 2018: Drawn (over), The Museum of Contemporary Art, Vojvodina, Serbia; Monumental, JAYJAY, Sacramento, California
- 2019: 38 Degrees, Red Gate Gallery, Beijing, China
- 2020: Color Memory, Red Gate Gallery, Beijing, China; Prizm Art Fair, Miami Art Week
- 2021: In Praise of Zen, Tatami Art Museum, Eiheiji, Japan; Tacit Facet: Small and Mighty, curator Camilø Álvårez of Samson, Brookline Arts Center, Brookline, Massachusetts
- 2022: The Beautyful Ones Are ~~Not Yet~~ Born, AFRIKIN ART 2022, Maison AfriKin, Miami, Florida; Border Free, Red Gate Gallery, Beijing, China; Countdown Series 4, Red Gate Gallery, Beijing, China; 30th Anniversary Group Show, Skoto Gallery, New York City
- 2026: Draw, Passerelle Centre for Contemporary Art, Brest, France
