= Bruce McNeil =

American photographer (1939–2019)

- Born: February 13, 1939; New York, New York, U.S.
- Died: May 16, 2019 (aged 80); Washington, DC, U.S.
- Occupation: Photographer
- Known for: Environmental river photography

Bruce McNeil (February 19, 1939 – May 16, 2019) was an American environmental fine arts photographer predominantly known for photographic work which has documented the Washington, DC area waterways. For over two decades his environmental photography has especially focused on documenting the Anacostia River. The Washington Examiner and The Washington Post have dubbed him as “DC River Man” and “Washington’s River Man.” He was the organizer of the Anacostia River School of Photography, "a ragtag group of a half-dozen photographers who either live or work in the neighborhood and are devoted to shooting the river and its environs." McNeill died on May 16, 2019, at the age of 80.

== Work ==
Mc Neil was a former photographer, lightening and dark room technician, and fabricator of the installations at the McCord Museum in the William Notman Photographic Archives, and assistant to the designer and photographer for the MacDonald Steward Foundation. His work has been exhibited at the Smithsonian Anacostia Community Museum, Sandy Spring Museum, Reginald F. Lewis Museum of Maryland African-American History & Culture, George Washington University Museum, Parish Gallery, Hill Center Galleries at the Old Naval Hospital, and the Anacostia Art Center. McNeil is the recipient of the East of the River Distinguished Artist Award in 2016, and his work is in the permanent collection of the city of Washington, DC.

== Press ==
In discussing McNeil's photos at the city's Honfleur Gallery in 2012, a Washington Post writer noted that "McNeil’s work centers around the growth of the neighborhood through manipulating images of the Anacostia River." In reviewing the same exhibition, the Post's art critic added that "Bruce McNeil’s “A River Divide — A Tale of Two Cities,” for example, is an impressionistic photograph of light on the Anacostia."
