= E. carnea =

E. carnea may refer to:

- Eilema carnea, a Malagasy moth
- Eria carnea, a flowering plant
- Erica carnea, a flowering plant
- Erythrotrichia carnea, a red algae
- Eucalyptus carnea, a flowering plant
