= Norman Parish =

American painter

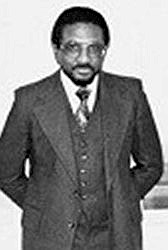
- Born: August 26, 1937; New Orleans, Louisiana, U.S.
- Died: July 8, 2013 (aged 75); Germantown, Maryland, U.S.
- Education: Art Institute of Chicago
- Occupations: Artist, Art dealer

Norman Parish (born New Orleans, raised in Chicago August 26, 1937 - July 8, 2013) was an American artist and art dealer. He was the founder and director of the Parish Gallery (founded in 1991) in the Georgetown neighborhood of Washington, DC. The gallery was described by The Washington Post as an art gallery "that spotlighted African American artists at a time when few other galleries concentrated on showing their work."

== Education ==
Parish studied at the Art Institute of Chicago and the University of Chicago.

== Early life and artwork ==
Early in his career as an artist in Chicago, Parish was part of a politically active group of African American artists in Chicago, some of whom were later part of the AfriCOBRA (African Commune of Bad Relevant Artists) group founded in 1968 by artists Wadsworth Jarrell and Jeff Donaldson, who both taught at Howard University. In the late 1960s, Parish and more than a dozen politically active African American artists in Chicago created a then controversial mural, known as The Wall of Respect, in Chicago’s South Side which 40 years later is now "credited with sparking the creation of other ethnic murals around the world." The mural was also celebrated by the Pulitzer Prize-winning poet Gwendolyn Brooks in one of her poems: “The Wall.”

Parish moved to Washington, DC in 1988 and opened the Parish Gallery in 1991. “It’s because I found out how many artists there were that needed support,” says Norman. “They were good, really good. But they needed someone to help get their work out into the world”, he recalled in an interview in 2013.

“At first, a lot of the artists we featured I knew from art school,” he added in the same interview. “But around 93 and 94, other artists just started coming to me. These were artists missing opportunities because nobody was looking out for them, nobody was out there promoting their work.”

== Parish Gallery ==
Norman Parish's Georgetown gallery "became one of the country’s best-known black-owned art galleries, with a focus on works by African Americans and other artists of what is known as the African diaspora."

Over the years that the gallery was opened, it showcased the work of more than 170 artists from the United States, Nigeria, Ethiopia, Ghana, South Africa and Morocco, alongside those from Greece, Turkey, Brazil, Spain, and France, including such well-known artists as Sam Gilliam, Richard Mayhew, Lou Stovall, Percy Martin, Evangeline Montgomery, Victor Ekpuk, Lois Mailou Jones, and Wadsworth Jarrell.
