= Parish Gallery =

Art gallery in Washington, DC, United States

Coordinates: 38.9046°N 77.0619°W

Parish Gallery was a Washington, DC art gallery located in the Georgetown neighborhood of Washington. It was active from 1991 to 2013.

== History ==
The Parish Gallery was founded by Norman Parish in 1991. Parish had moved to Washington, DC from Chicago in 1988, and opened the Parish Gallery in 1991. The gallery was described by The Washington Post as an art gallery "that spotlighted African American artists at a time when few other galleries concentrated on showing their work." The gallery closed in 2013 upon Parish's death.

== Artists represented ==
In the 22 years that the gallery operated, it generally focused on African-American artists and artists of color, but overall exhibited the work of more than 170 artists from the United States, Nigeria, Ethiopia, Ghana, South Africa, Morocco, Haiti, Jamaica, Greece, Turkey, Brazil, Spain, England, Russia, and France, including notable artists such as Sam Gilliam, Richard Mayhew, Willard Wigan, Lou Stovall, Percy Martin, Evangeline Montgomery, Victor Ekpuk, Lois Mailou Jones, Romare Bearden, Herbert Gentry, Bruce McNeil, and Wadsworth Jarrell.

== Notable exhibitions ==
In a 1992 review, The Washington Post art critic noted that "It's all too seldom one gets the chance in Washington to see the work of Jamaican or other Caribbean artists in the intimate setting of a private gallery. It's therefore a treat to get acquainted with the works of Cecil Cooper, Kofi Kayiga and Bryan McFarlane at the Parish Gallery this month." In 1995, a different Washington Post art critic, in reviewing a show by New York artist Lorenzo Pace, wrote that "This is a remarkably effective exhibition, particularly given the small space and a medium that often appeals to the head rather than the heart." The same art critic also wrote in a different 1995 review that "Minimalism's antithesis, abstract expressionism, can be seen in recent paintings by Kathryn Henneberry being exhibited at Parish Gallery. They are wonderfully exuberant works, big, vivid fields of color that convey a sense of spontaneity and freedom. If minimalism comes mainly from the mind, Henneberry's works come from the heart and soul."

The Washington Post's 1996 review of Wadsworth Jarrell observed that "Jarrell's works still pulse with the repetitious rhythms, vibrant colors and geometric symbols that Africobra drew from African art."

A 2012 article about artist Maria-Lana Queen quotes a collector as stating that "When I looked at her work for the first time I was blown away by the color from this abstract artist." A review of British artist Willard Wigan that same year stated that "he works of groundbreaking British artist Willard Wigan inspire awe because they are so tiny."
