= Eucalyptus latisinensis =

White mahogany

Scientific classification
- Kingdom: Plantae
- Clade: Tracheophytes
- Clade: Angiosperms
- Clade: Eudicots
- Clade: Rosids
- Order: Myrtales
- Family: Myrtaceae
- Genus: Eucalyptus
- Species: E. latisinensis

Binomial name
- Eucalyptus latisinensis K.D.Hill

Species of eucalyptus

Eucalyptus latisinensis, commonly known as white mahogany, is a species of tree that is endemic to Queensland. It has rough, fibrous to stringy bark, lance-shaped to curved adult leaves, flower buds in groups of seven to eleven or more, white flowers and shortened spherical to hemispherical fruit.

== Description ==
Eucalyptus latisinensis is a tree that typically grows to a height of 18 m (59 ft) and forms a lignotuber. The bark extends from the trunk to the small branches and is rough, finely fibrous to stringy and grey to grey-brown. Young plants and coppice regrowth have sessile, broadly lance-shaped to egg-shaped leaves that are 50–150 mm (2.0–5.9 in) long and 30–70 mm (1.2–2.8 in) wide. Adult leaves are arranged alternately, the same shade of slightly glossy or dull green on both sides, coarsely textured, lance-shaped or curved, 60–160 mm (2.4–6.3 in) long and 10–40 mm (0.39–1.57 in) wide, tapering to a petiole 10–22 mm (0.39–0.87 in) long. The flower buds are arranged in leaf axils or in groups on the ends of branchlets in groups of seven to eleven or more on an unbranched peduncle 8–15 mm (0.31–0.59 in) long, the individual buds on pedicels 3–6 mm (0.12–0.24 in) long. Mature buds are oval, 4–6 mm (0.16–0.24 in) long and 3–4 mm (0.12–0.16 in) wide with a conical to beaked operculum. Flowering occurs has been observed in August and the flowers are white. The fruit is a woody, shortened spherical to hemispherical capsule, 3–7 mm (0.12–0.28 in) long and 5–9 mm (0.20–0.35 in) wide with the valves at or extending slightly above the level of the rim.

== Taxonomy ==
Eucalyptus latisinensis was first formally described in 1999 by the botanist Kenneth Hill from a specimen he collected from near Lowmead in 1996. The description was published in the journal Telopea. The specific epithet (latisinensis) is derived from the Latin words latus meaning "broad" or "wide" and sinus meaning "a bay" with the ending ensis indicating place of origin, referring to the distribution of this species near Wide Bay.

Eucalyptus latisinensis is part of the white mahogany group as recognised by Ken Hill. Others in the group include E. acmenoides, E. mediocris, E. carnea, E. apothalassica, E. helidonica, E. psammitica and E. umbra.

== Conservation status ==
This eucalypt is classified as "least concern" under the Queensland Government Nature Conservation Act 1992.

== See also ==
- List of Eucalyptus species
