= Kofi Kayiga =

Jamaican artist (born 1943)

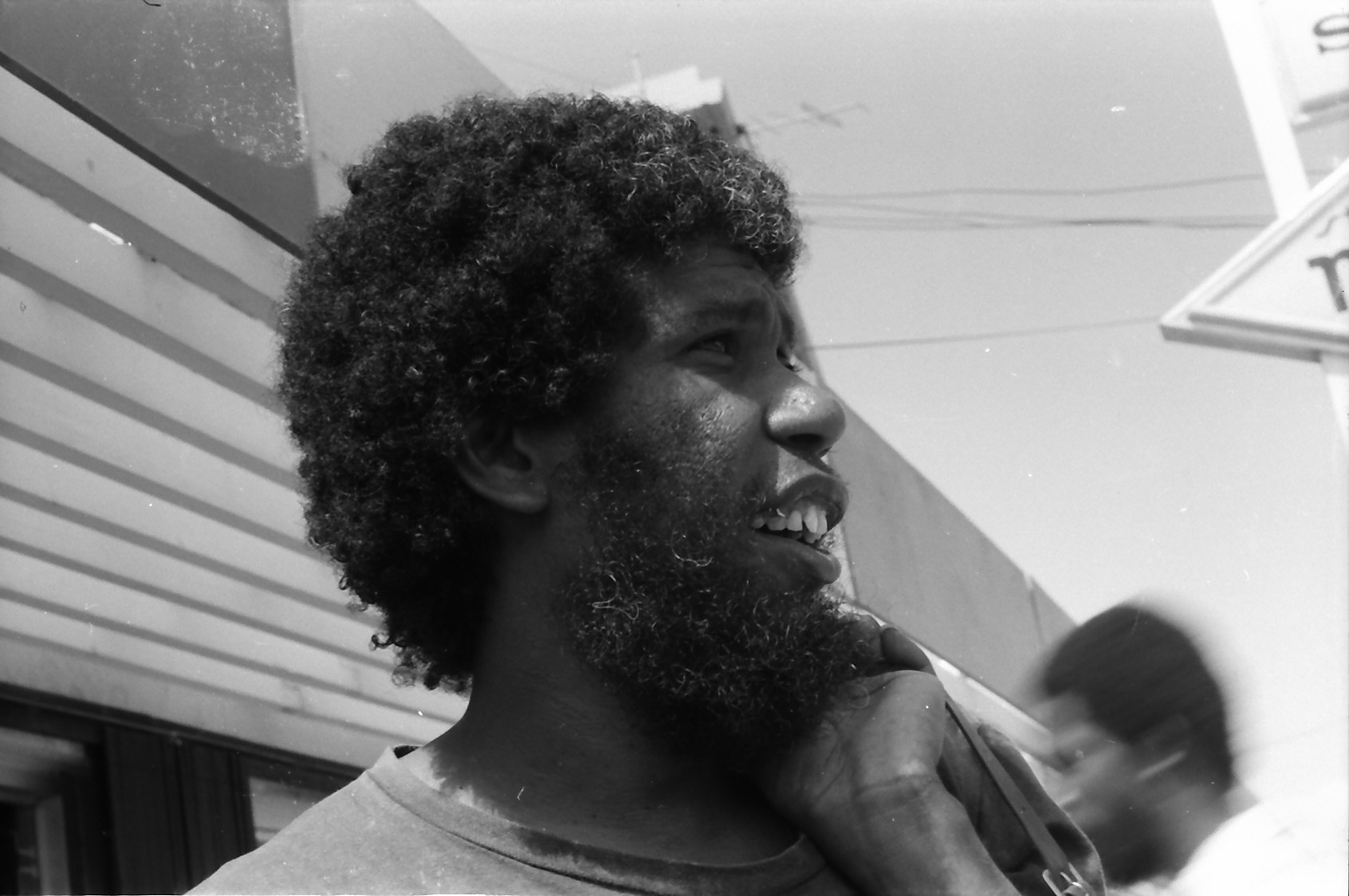
- Born: Ricardo Wilkins; December 1943 (age 82); Kingston, Jamaica
- Education: Jamaica School of Art; Royal College of Art
- Occupations: Artist and educator

Kofi Kayiga (born December 1943), formerly known as Ricardo Wilkins, is a Jamaican-born artist and educator, who migrated to the US, after periods spent in the UK and Uganda. He has exhibited widely internationally and since the 1960s has taught fine art at various institutions, becoming a professor at the Massachusetts College of Art and Design (MassArt).

== Biography ==
Born in Kingston, Jamaica, to Jamaican and Cuban parents, he studied at the Jamaica School of Art, and won a government scholarship that enabled him to go to London to pursue a master's degree in Fine Art at the Royal College of Art (1971).

He was a lecturer at Makerere University in Kampala, Uganda, in the early 1970s, and from 1973 to 1981 he was head of the painting department at the Jamaica School of Art. He was artist-in-residence at the College of the Holy Cross in Worcester, Massachusetts (1980–1983), and went on to become a professor at Massachusetts College of Art in Boston.

His work has been characterised as influenced by Africa and by Jamaican folklore and religious themes. In the words of the art historian Petrine Archer-Straw, "Kayiga’s work is concerned with origins, 'primitive'in the sense of exploring the essence of human consciousness and its links with spirituality. To access this deeper understanding of the self, Kofi strips himself of his formal training and approaches his subject matter intuitively and even mystically, recovering images from deepest memory and the subconscious. His is a pantheistic world that reveals the mystery of the universe in every aspect of daily life. Inanimate objects and situations become animate and alive with animal forms, insects and cosmic creatures that remind us that the spirit world is all around us. Unlike the many artists creating during this era who were inspired by the repatriation message of Garvey and Rastafari, Kayiga's world is not one of idealism mediated through the diaspora experience. Instead, he is the only artist who channeled a first-hand experience of Africa into his work, resulting in an immediacy and directness that consists of bold strokes, vibrant colour fields and symbolic language."

In 2015, Kayiga's work features exhibition No Colour Bar: Black British Art in Action 1960–1990 at the Guildhall Art Gallery, City of London.

== Selected exhibitions ==
Solo

- 2013, Kofi Kayiga at 70, Multitudes Gallery, Miami, FL, USA.
- 2005, Kayiga: SpiritHue, Bunker Hill Community College Art Gallery, Boston, MA, USA.
- 2000, Riverside Gallery, St Ann, Trinidad.
- 1998, Of Spirit and Technology — 30-Year Retrospective, Kingdom Fine Arts, Boston, MA, USA.
- 1998, Mystical Images, Lafayette College, Black Culture Center, USA.
- 1996, Gateway 4, Newark, New Jersey, USA.
- 1994, Mutual Life Gallery, Kingston, Jamaica.
- 1990–91, Museum of African American Life and Culture, Dallas, Texas, USA.
- 1983, Paintings and Drawings, Brownagree Gallery, Commonwealth Institute, London, UK.
- 1981, Major Works, Museum of the National Centre of Afro American Artists, Boston, MA, USA.
- 1979, Drawings, Mercer Arts Salon New York, NY, USA.
- 1975, Nine-Year Retrospective, Olympia International Art Centre, Kingston, Jamaica.
- 1972, Paintings, West Indian Students' Centre, London, UK.
- 1971, Paintings and Drawings, Nomo Gallery, Kampala, Uganda.
- 1970, Paintings, Kingston Parish Library, Kingston, Jamaica.
- 1967, Paintings, Contemporary Art Gallery, Kingston, Jamaica.

Group

- 2015, No Colour Bar: Black British Art in Action 1960–1990, Guildhall Art Gallery, City of London, UK.
- 2005, Back to Black, Whitechapel Gallery and touring, UK.
- 1998–99, Four Group Shows, Kingdom Fine Arts, Boston, MA, USA.
- 1998, Black as Colour: Art, Cinema, and the Racial Imaginary, National Gallery of Jamaica, Kingston.
- 1997, Mutual Life Gallery, Kingston, Jamaica.
- 1992, Cecil Cooper, Kofi Kayiga, Bryan McFarlane, Parish Gallery, Washington, D.C., USA.
- 1991, Travelling Exhibit, Virginia Museum of Fine Arts, Richmond, VA, USA.
- 1990, Forty Years: Edna Manley School for the Visual Arts, National Gallery of Jamaica, Kingston.
- 1989–90, Black Art Ancestral Legacy, Dallas Museum of Art, Dallas, Texas, USA.
- 1988, Works on Paper, Institute of Contemporary Arts, Boston, MA, USA.
- 1986, Anniversary Group Exhibit, Contemporary Art Centre, Kingston Jamaica.
- 1983, Museum of the National Centre of Afro American Artists, Boston, MA, USA.
- 1978, Eleven Jamaican Painters, Caracas, Venezuela.
- 1972–92, Annual National Exhibition, National Gallery of Jamaica, Kingston.
