= MahoganyBooks =

American independent bookstore

Coordinates: 38.866947°N 76.9887078°W

- Type: Independent bookstore
- Industry: Bookselling
- Genre: Works by African diaspora
- Founded: 2007; 19 years ago
- Founder: Derrick Young; Ramunda Young
- Area served: Washington metropolitan area
- Website: www.mahoganybooks.com

MahoganyBooks is an independent bookstore specializing in works by the African diaspora. It was established as an online store in 2007 by Derrick and Ramunda Young. They opened a physical location at the Anacostia Arts Center in 2017 and a second location in National Harbor, Maryland opened on Juneteenth in 2021.

== History ==
MahoganyBooks is a Black-owned company cofounded by Derrick and Ramunda Young. It was established in 2007 as an online bookstore operating out of the Youngs' one-bedroom apartment in Alexandria, Virginia. In November 2017, they opened a 500 square feet location at the Anacostia Arts Center. The bookshop is named after their daughter. The Youngs opened MahoganyBooks as "a protest movement" aimed at empowering the Black community. The store specializes in works by the African diaspora. MahoganyBooks is the first D.C. bookshop to open east of the Anacostia River since the Pyramid Books chain closed in the mid-1990s. The logo is a silhouette of a girl with Afro puffs reading a book.

In 2020, MahoganyBooks won a $5,000 "Resilient Together" grant from Cities of Service, the District of Columbia Office of Planning, and the Local Initiatives Support Corporation. The funds supported a yearlong series, Black Books Matter: From the Writer's Perspective which featured writings by Ward 8 residents. On January 26, 2021, former U.S. president Barack Obama joined the MahoganyBook book club's Black History Month virtual kickoff meeting.

In 2021, a second location opened on Juneteenth in National Harbor, Maryland.
