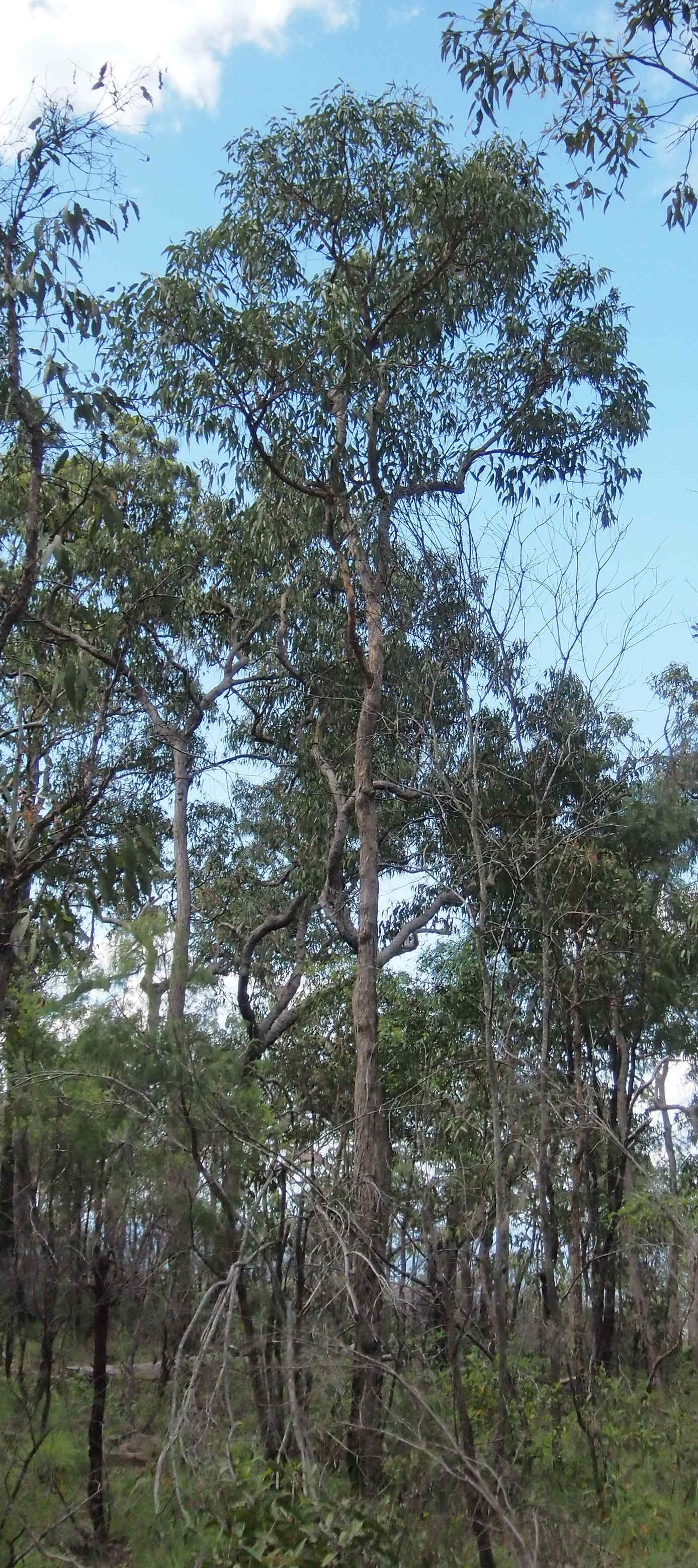

Scientific classification
- Kingdom: Plantae
- Clade: Tracheophytes
- Clade: Angiosperms
- Clade: Eudicots
- Clade: Rosids
- Order: Myrtales
- Family: Myrtaceae
- Genus: Eucalyptus
- Species: E. mediocris

Binomial name
- Eucalyptus mediocris L.A.S.Johnson & K.D.Hill

Synonyms
- Eucalyptus irritans L.A.S.Johnson & K.D.Hill

= Eucalyptus mediocris =

Inland white mahogany

Species of eucalyptus

Eucalyptus mediocris, commonly known as inland white mahogany, is a eucalypt that is endemic to the Australian state of Queensland.

== Description ==
The tree grows to a height of around 20 metres (66 ft) and has a lignotuber. It has fibrous, rough grey or yellowish grey-brown or orange-brown-grey coloured bark throughout. It is attached to the trunk in flat strips resembling a typical stringybark.

The concolorous glossy green adult leaves are alternately arranged. The leaf blade has a lanceolate to falcate shape and are 6 to 17 centimetres (2 to 7 in) in length and 1 to 2.5 centimetres (0.39 to 0.98 in) wide. It flowers between July and October producing axillary unbranched inflorescences but can appear to be arranged in clusters toward the end of the branch. The ovoid to obovoid shaped green to yellow mature buds are 0.7 to 0.8 cm (0.276 to 0.315 in) in length and 0.3 to 0.4 cm (0.118 to 0.157 in) wide and have creamy shaped flowers.

The fruit that form after flowering have a truncate-globose to hemispherical shape with a length of 0.5 to 0.8 cm (0.197 to 0.315 in) and a width of 0.5 to 1.0 cm (0.197 to 0.394 in). The disc is almost level and has three or four valves. The fruit contain brown coloured seeds with a pyramidal shape and a length of about 1.5 to 2.5 mm (0.059 to 0.098 in).

== Taxonomy ==
The species was first formally described by the botanists Lawrence Alexander Sidney Johnson and Ken Hill in 1992 as part of the work "A taxonomic revision of the White Mahogonies, Eucalyptus series Acmenoideae (Myrtaceae)" as published in the journal Telopea.

The specific epithet is taken from the Latin word mediocris meaning "middling" in reference to medium-sized habit of the tree.

E. mediocris is part of the white mahogany group as recognised by Ken Hill, others in the group include; E. acmenoides, E. apothalassica, E. carnea, E. helidonica, E. latisinensis, E. psammitica and E. umbra.

The type specimen was collected by Ken Hill just north of Glenhaughton in 1996.

== Distribution ==
The tree is native to an area of inland Queensland from around the Carnarvon Range in the north east extending south to the Atherton Tableland.

== See also ==
- List of Eucalyptus species
