= Mahogany (email client) =

Open source email client

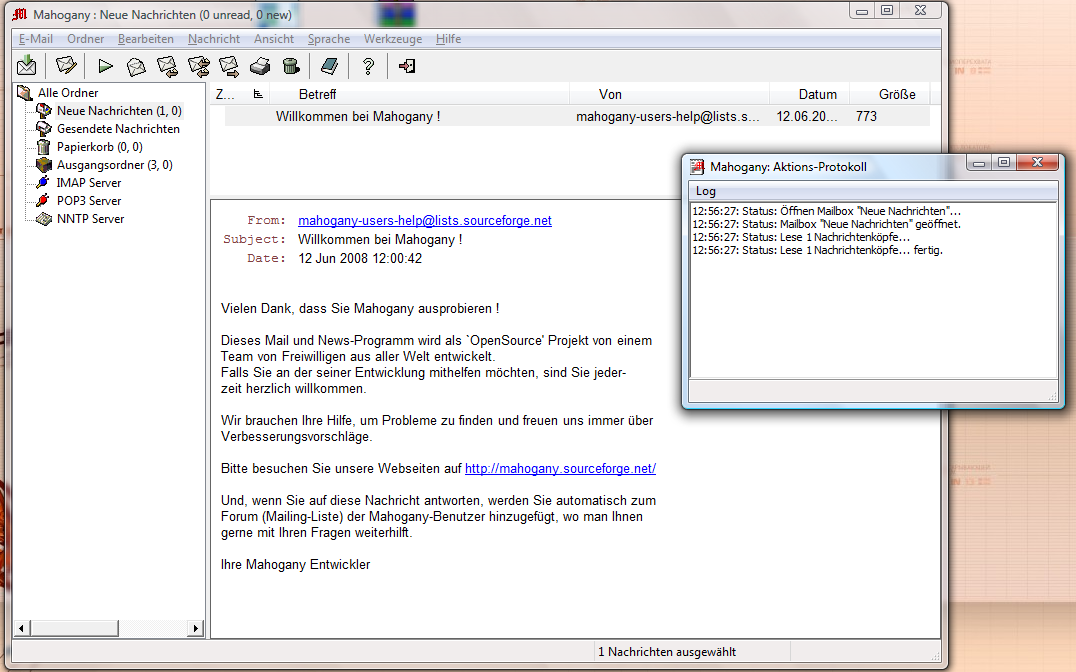
Mahogany on Windows Vista

Mahogany is an open source cross-platform email and news client.

== Overview ==
It is available for X11/Unix and MS Win32 platforms, supporting a wide range of protocols and standards, including Simple Mail Transfer Protocol (SMTP), POP3, IMAP, NNTP (including SSL support for all of them) and full MIME support.

The current official release version is 0.67 (published in August 2006).

== Development ==
Mahogany is developed by The Mahogany Development Team (Founding members Karsten Ballüder and Vadim Zeitlin). It is licensed under a special Mahogany Artistic License similar to the Perl Artistic License but the developers also allow licensing the program under GNU GPL license.

== Features ==
The program features an optional embedded Python interpreter. Python scripts have full access to all internal Mahogany data structures and objects and can be used to extend Mahogany.

== See also ==
- Alpine (email client)
- Balsa (email client)
