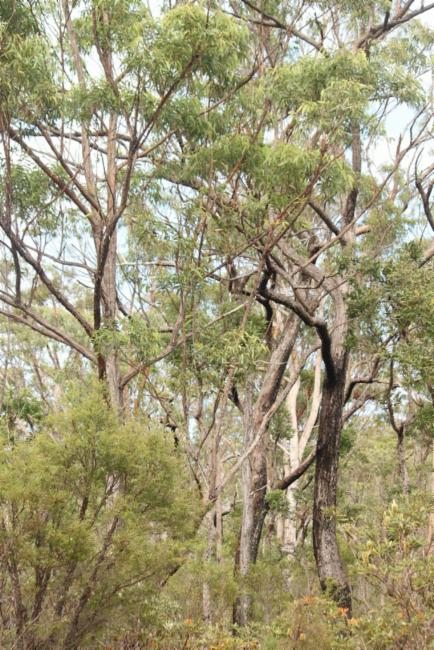
- Eucalyptus psammitica near Kremnos

Scientific classification
- Kingdom: Plantae
- Clade: Tracheophytes
- Clade: Angiosperms
- Clade: Eudicots
- Clade: Rosids
- Order: Myrtales
- Family: Myrtaceae
- Genus: Eucalyptus
- Species: E. psammitica

Binomial name
- Eucalyptus psammitica L.A.S.Johnson & K.D.Hill

= Eucalyptus psammitica =

Bastard white mahogany

Species of eucalyptus

Eucalyptus psammitica, commonly known as bastard white mahogany, is a species of small to medium-sized tree that is endemic to eastern Australia. It has rough, stringy or fibrous, prickly bark on the trunk and branches, lance-shaped to curved adult leaves, flower buds in groups of between seven and eleven, white flowers and cup-shaped to hemispherical fruit.

== Description ==
Eucalyptus psammitica is a tree that typically grows to a height of 15–20 m (49–66 ft) and forms a lignotuber. It has rough, stringy or fibrous, loose, grey or grey-brown bark on the trunk and branches. Young plants and coppice regrowth have mostly sessile leaves arranged in opposite pairs, paler on the lower surface and egg-shaped, 65–110 mm (2.6–4.3 in) long and 20–50 mm (0.79–1.97 in) wide. Adult leaves are more or less the same shade of glossy green on both sides, lance-shaped to curved, 70–180 mm (2.8–7.1 in) long and 12–30 mm (0.47–1.18 in) wide, tapering to a petiole 10–20 mm (0.39–0.79 in) long. The flower buds are arranged in leaf axils in groups of between seven and eleven on an unbranched peduncle 5–18 mm (0.20–0.71 in) long, the individual buds on pedicels 3–7 mm (0.12–0.28 in) long. Mature buds are oval, 6–7 mm (0.24–0.28 in) long and 3–5 mm (0.12–0.20 in) wide with a conical to beaked operculum. Flowering occurs from October to November and the flowers are white. The fruit is a woody, cup-shaped to hemispherical capsule 7–9 mm (0.28–0.35 in) long and 8–9 mm (0.31–0.35 in) wide with the valves near rim level.

== Taxonomy ==
Eucalyptus psammitica was first formally described by the botanists Lawrence Alexander Sidney Johnson and Kenneth Hill in 1990 in the journal Telopea.

Eucalyptus psammitica is part of the white mahogany group as recognised by Ken Hill. Others in the group include E. acmenoides, E. mediocris, E. carnea, E. apothalassica, E. helidonica, E. latisinensis and E. umbra. The specific epithet is from the Greek word psammos meaning sand in reference to its preferred habitat.

== Distribution ==
Bastard white mahogany occurs in an area stretching from north-west of Coffs Harbour to north-west of Grafton in north-eastern New South Wales. It is also found in the area south-west of Brisbane in Queensland. The tree is found in subcoastal areas of over and around sandstone growing in shallow sandy soils.
