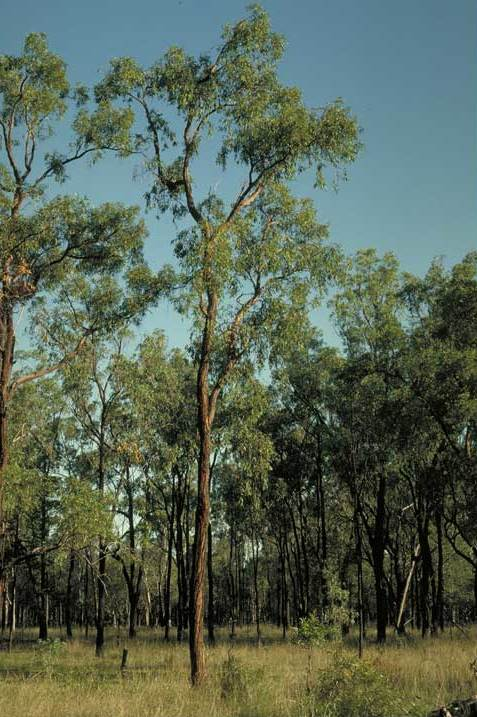
- Eucalyptus tenuipes near Bauhinia

Scientific classification
- Kingdom: Plantae
- Clade: Embryophytes
- Clade: Tracheophytes
- Clade: Spermatophytes
- Clade: Angiosperms
- Clade: Eudicots
- Clade: Rosids
- Order: Myrtales
- Family: Myrtaceae
- Genus: Eucalyptus
- Species: E. tenuipes

Binomial name
- Eucalyptus tenuipes Blakely & C.T.White

Synonyms
- Eucalyptus acmenioides var. tenuipes Maiden & Blakely orth. var.; Eucalyptus acmenoides var. tenuipes Maiden & Blakely

= Eucalyptus tenuipes =

Narrow-leaved white mahogany

Species of eucalyptus

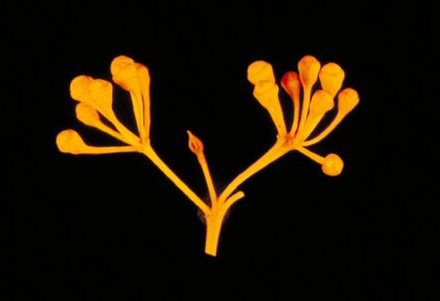
Flower buds

Eucalyptus tenuipes, known as the narrow-leaved white mahogany, is a species of small tree that is endemic to Queensland. It has rough, fibrous bark, narrow lance-shaped leaves arranged in opposite pairs, flower buds in group of eleven to twenty, white flowers and spherical to hemispherical fruit.

== Description ==
Eucalyptus tenuipes is a tree that typically grows to a height of 5–15 m (16–49 ft) and forms a lignotuber. It has rough, greyish brown, fibrous bark on the trunk and branches. Young plants and coppice regrowth have sessile leaves that are paler on the lower surface, linear to narrow lance-shaped 70–155 mm (2.8–6.1 in) long, 4–12 mm (0.16–0.47 in) wide and arranged in opposite pairs. Adult leaves are arranged in opposite pairs, dull, dark green on the upper surface, much paler below, narrow lance-shaped to narrow elliptical, 50–135 mm (2.0–5.3 in) long and 8–20 mm (0.31–0.79 in) wide tapering to a petiole 4–15 mm (0.16–0.59 in) long. The flower buds are arranged on the ends of branchlets and in leaf axils in groups of eleven to twenty or more on a thin, branching peduncle 3–15 mm (0.12–0.59 in) long, the individual buds on pedicels 6–15 mm (0.24–0.59 in) long. Mature buds are spherical to pear-shaped or oval, 3–4 mm (0.12–0.16 in) long and 2–3 mm (0.079–0.118 in) wide with a hemispherical operculum. Flowering has been observed in January, March, May and July and the flowers are white. The fruit is a woody shortened spherical to hemispherical capsule 4–5 mm (0.16–0.20 in) long and wide with the valves near rim level.

== Taxonomy and naming ==
In 1928, Joseph Maiden and William Blakely described Eucalyptus acmenoides var. tenuipes in Maiden's book, A Critical Revision of the Genus Eucalyptus from specimens collected by Harald Ingemann Jensen near "Meteor Creek, South Central Queensland". In 1931, Blakely and Cyril Tenison White raised the variety to species status as E. tenuipes in Proceedings of the Royal Society of Queensland. The specific epithet (tenuipes) is from the Latin tenui- meaning "slender" or "thin" and pes meaning "foot", referring to the thin pedicels of the flower buds.

== Distribution and habitat ==
Eucalyptus tenuipes grows in open forest on gently slopes between Rockhampton and St George and sporadically further north.

== Conservation status ==
This eucalypt is classified as "least concern" under the Queensland Government Nature Conservation Act 1992.

== See also ==
- List of Eucalyptus species
