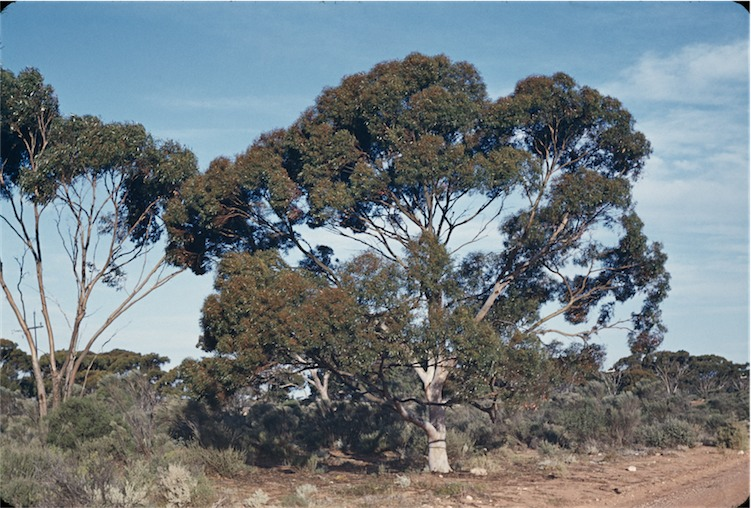
- Eucalyptus brockwayi growing near Norseman

Conservation status
- Near Threatened (IUCN 3.1)

Scientific classification
- Kingdom: Plantae
- Clade: Tracheophytes
- Clade: Angiosperms
- Clade: Eudicots
- Clade: Rosids
- Order: Myrtales
- Family: Myrtaceae
- Genus: Eucalyptus
- Species: E. brockwayi

Binomial name
- Eucalyptus brockwayi C.A.Gardner

= Eucalyptus brockwayi =

Dundas mahogany

Species of eucalyptus

Eucalyptus brockwayi, commonly known as Dundas mahogany, is a tree that is endemic to Western Australia. It has smooth, shiny bark on the trunk and branches, glossy green, linear to narrow lance-shaped adult leaves, flower buds arranged in groups of between eleven and fifteen, white flowers and spherical fruit with a narrow neck.

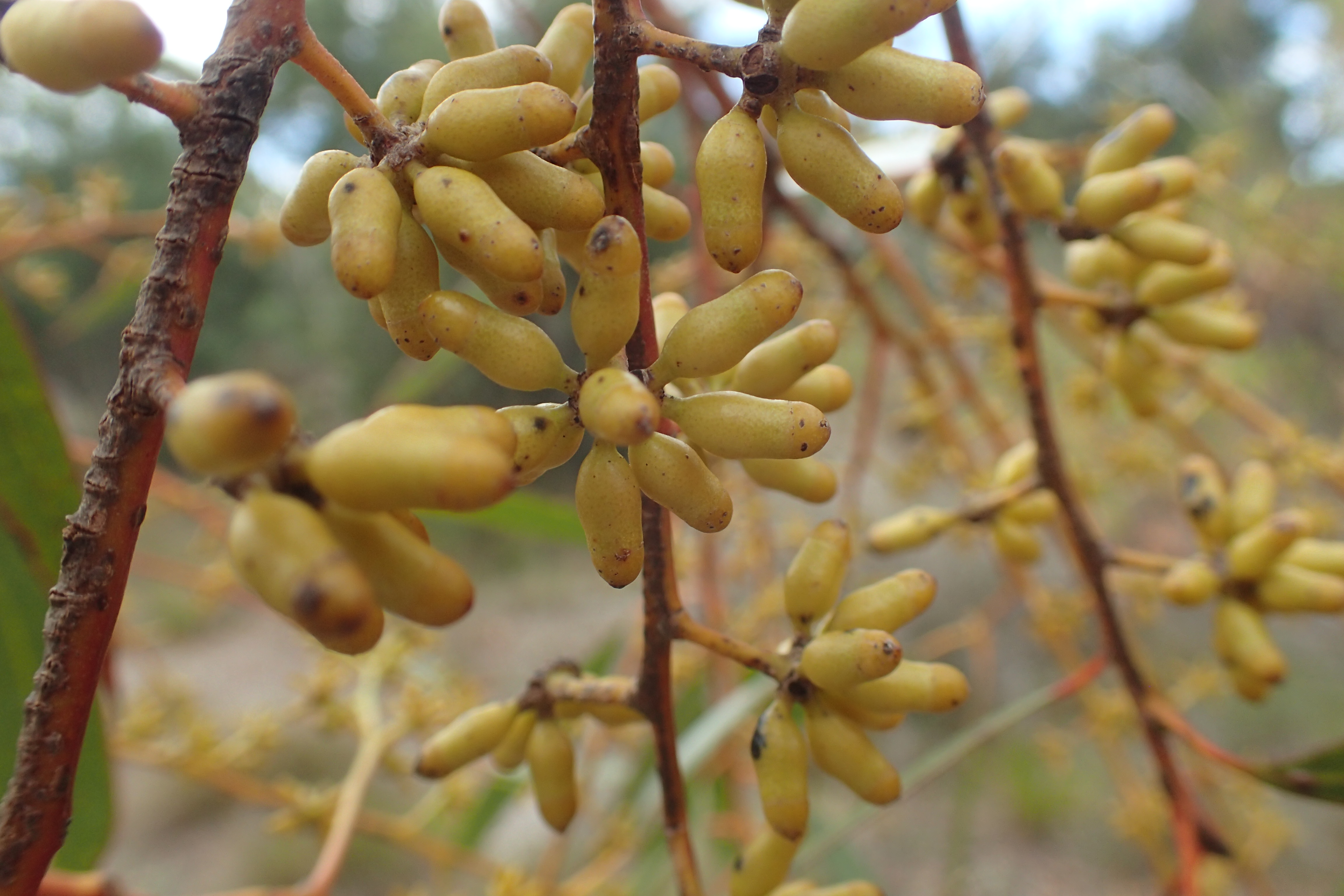
Buds

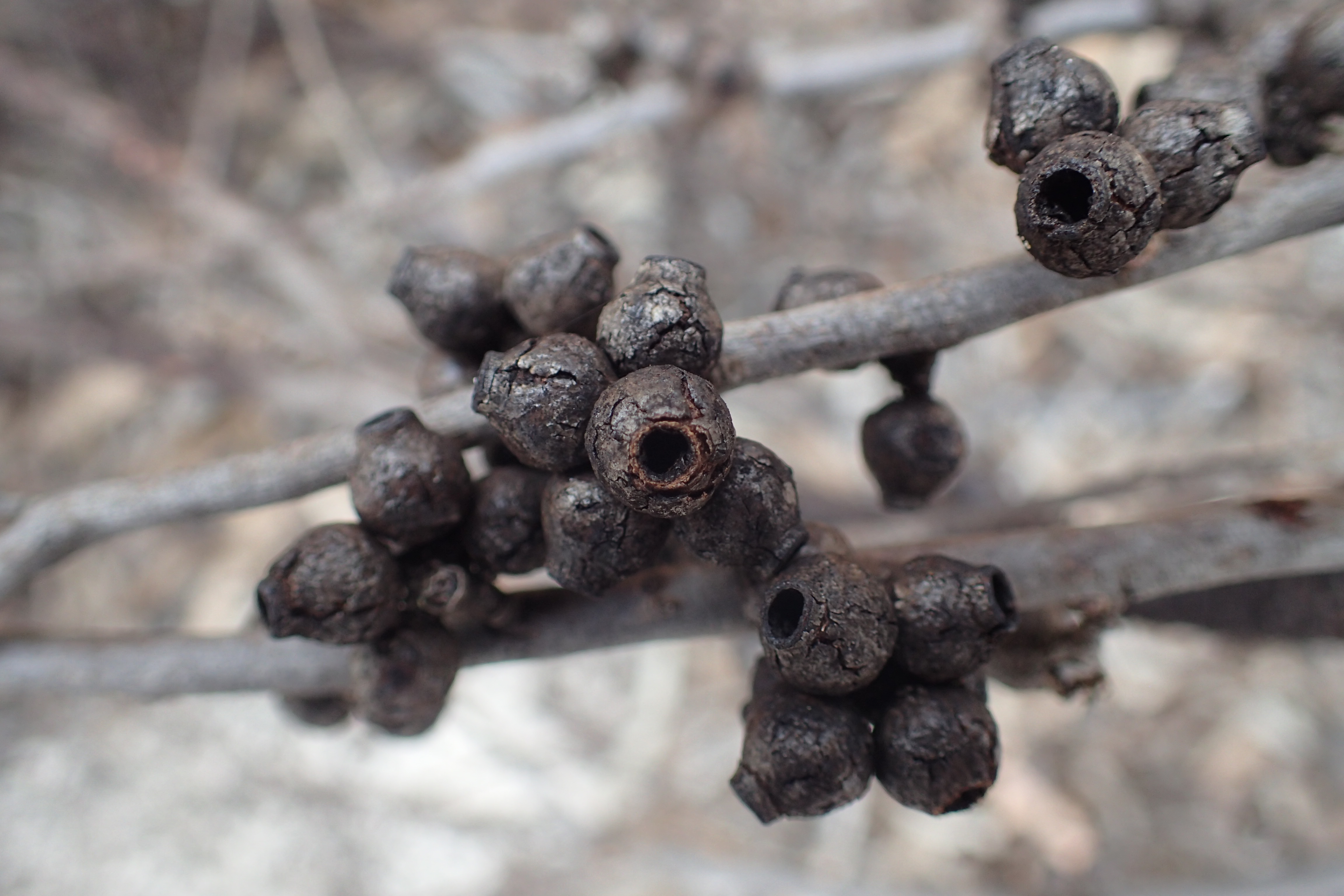
Fruit

== Description ==
Eucalyptus brockwayi is a tree that typically grows to a height of 15 to 25 metres (49 to 82 ft) but does not form a lignotuber. It has smooth, shiny light grey, pinkish and creamy white bark on its trunk and branches. Young plants and coppice regrowth have dull green, sessile, elliptic leaves, 20–70 mm (0.79–2.8 in) long and 5–27 mm (0.2–1 in) wide. The adult leaves are very glossy green, linear to narrow lance-shaped, 70–150 mm (2.8–5.9 in) long and 8–18 mm (0.3–0.7 in) wide on a petiole 12–20 mm (0.47–0.79 in) long. The flower buds are arranged in groups of eleven, thirteen or fifteen on a flattened peduncle 5–13 mm (0.2–0.5 in) long, the individual buds on a pedicel 1–2 mm (0.04–0.08 in) long. The mature buds are cylindrical to oval with a swollen base, 6–8 mm (0.24–0.31 in) long and 3–4 mm (0.1–0.2 in) wide with a blunt conical to rounded operculum. Flowering occurs from March to June and the flowers are white. The fruit is a woody, spherical capsule, 4–6 mm (0.16–0.24 in) long and 4–7 mm (0.16–0.28 in) wide with an urn-shaped base, the three valves enclosed within the rim.

== Taxonomy and naming ==
Eucalyptus brockwayi was first formally described in 1943 by Charles Gardner and the description was published in Journal of the Royal Society of Western Australia. The specific epithet (brockwayi) honours George Ernest Emerson Brockway, for his contribution to "knowledge of the genus Eucalyptus" in eastern parts of Western Australia.

== Distribution and habitat ==
Dundas mahogany is found in small stands on low, rocky hills and slopes in woodland and forest in the Norseman and Dundas areas.

== Conservation ==
Eucalyptus brockwayi is classified as "Priority Three" by the Government of Western Australia Department of Parks and Wildlife meaning that it is poorly known and known from only a few locations but is not under imminent threat.

== See also ==
- List of Eucalyptus species
