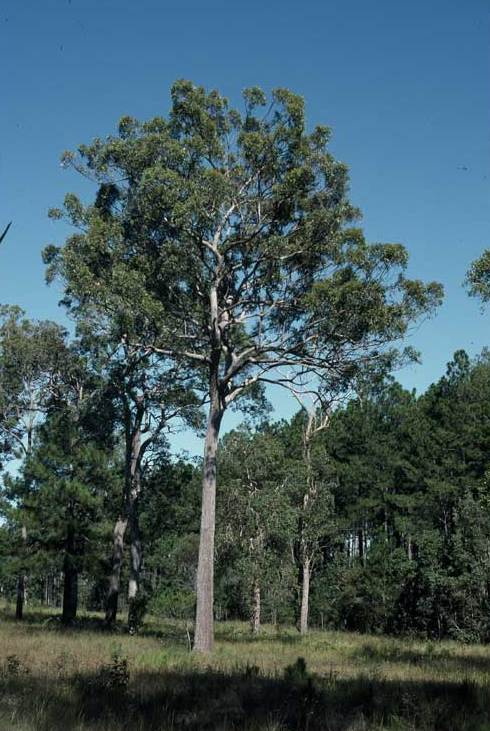
- Eucalyptus umbra near Gympie

Scientific classification
- Kingdom: Plantae
- Clade: Embryophytes
- Clade: Tracheophytes
- Clade: Spermatophytes
- Clade: Angiosperms
- Clade: Eudicots
- Clade: Rosids
- Order: Myrtales
- Family: Myrtaceae
- Genus: Eucalyptus
- Species: E. umbra

Binomial name
- Eucalyptus umbra R.T.Baker

= Eucalyptus umbra =

Broad-leaved white mahogany

Species of eucalyptus

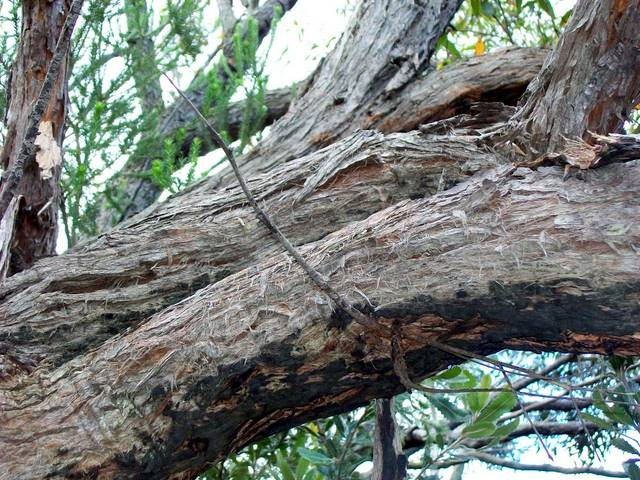
Bark (in Ku-ring-gai Chase National Park)

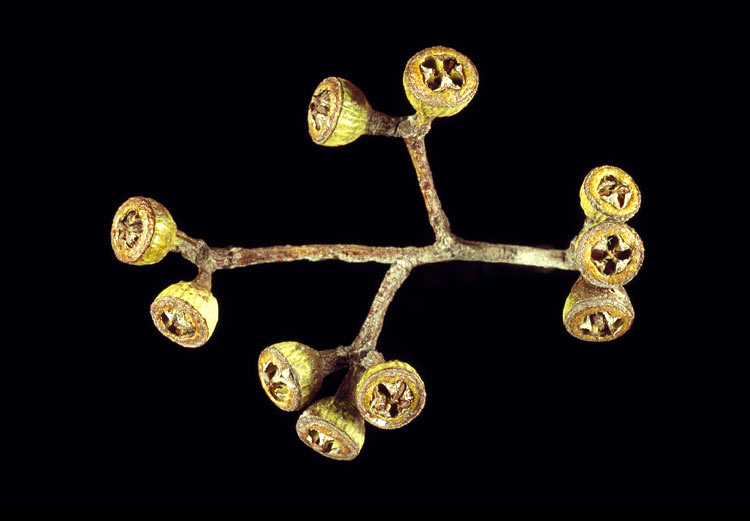
Fruit

Eucalyptus umbra, known as the broad-leaved white mahogany, is a species of small to medium-sized tree that is endemic to northern New South Wales. It has rough, fibrous to stringy bark on the trunk and branches, lance-shaped to curved adult leaves, flower buds in groups of seven to fifteen, white flowers and cup-shaped to hemispherical fruit.

== Description ==
Eucalyptus umbra is a tree that typically grows to a height of 25 m (82 ft) and forms a lignotuber. Young plants and coppice regrowth have sessile leaves that are broadly egg-shaped to lance shaped, 80–200 mm (3.1–7.9 in) long, 35–100 mm (1.4–3.9 in) wide, held horizontally and arranged in opposite pairs with the bases surrounding the stem. Adult leaves are arranged alternately, the same shade of green on both sides, lance-shaped to curved, 60–180 mm (2.4–7.1 in) long and 15–45 mm (0.59–1.77 in) wide, tapering to a petiole 10–20 mm (0.39–0.79 in) long. The flower buds are mostly arranged in panicles on the ends of branchlets on a peduncle 6–20 mm (0.24–0.79 in) long, the individual buds on pedicels 3–7 mm (0.12–0.28 in) long. Mature buds are oval, about 6 mm (0.24 in) long and 3–4 mm (0.12–0.16 in) wide with a conical to beaked operculum. Flowering occurs from September to February and the flowers are white. The fruit is a woody cup-shaped to hemispherical capsule 3–7 mm (0.12–0.28 in) long and 6–10 mm (0.24–0.39 in) wide with the valves near rim level or below it.

== Taxonomy and naming ==
Eucalyptus umbra was first formally described in 1901 by Richard Thomas Baker in Proceedings of the Linnean Society of New South Wales. The specific epithet is a Latin word meaning "shade" or "shadow", possibly referring to the shade provided by the tree.

== Distribution and habitat ==
The broad-leaved white mahogany occurs in the high rainfall coastal areas of New South Wales between Sydney and Grafton. It grows in dry sclerophyll forest or woodland, usually on poor shallow dry soils. It differs from the white mahogany (Eucalyptus latisinensis) of coastal Queensland in having broader juvenile leaves.

Eucalyptus umbra is part of the white mahogany group as recognised by Ken Hill. Others in the group include E. acmenoides, E. mediocris, E. carnea, E. apothalassica, E. helidonica, E. psammitica and E. latisinensis.
