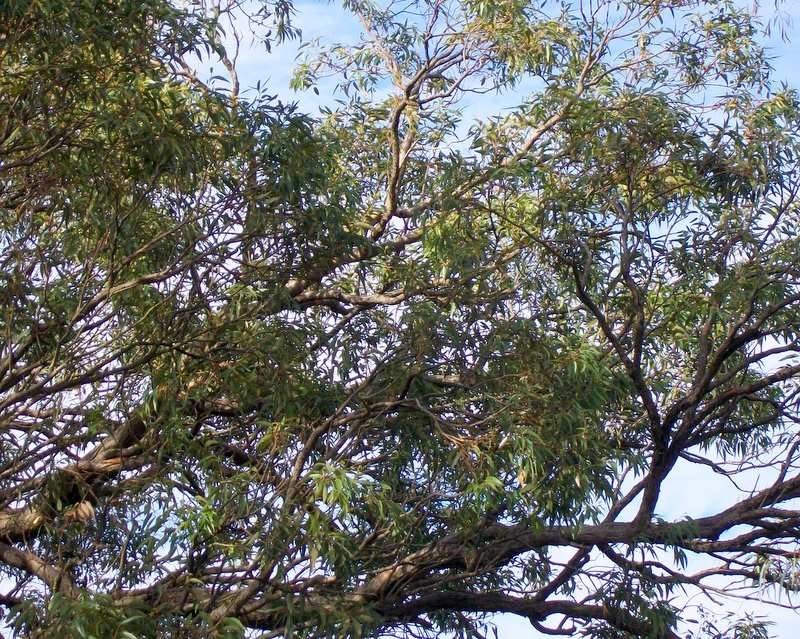
- Eucalyptus notabilis at Springwood, Blue Mountains

Scientific classification
- Kingdom: Plantae
- Clade: Embryophytes
- Clade: Tracheophytes
- Clade: Spermatophytes
- Clade: Angiosperms
- Clade: Eudicots
- Clade: Rosids
- Order: Myrtales
- Family: Myrtaceae
- Genus: Eucalyptus
- Species: E. notabilis

Binomial name
- Eucalyptus notabilis Maiden

= Eucalyptus notabilis =

Blue Mountains mahogany

Species of eucalyptus

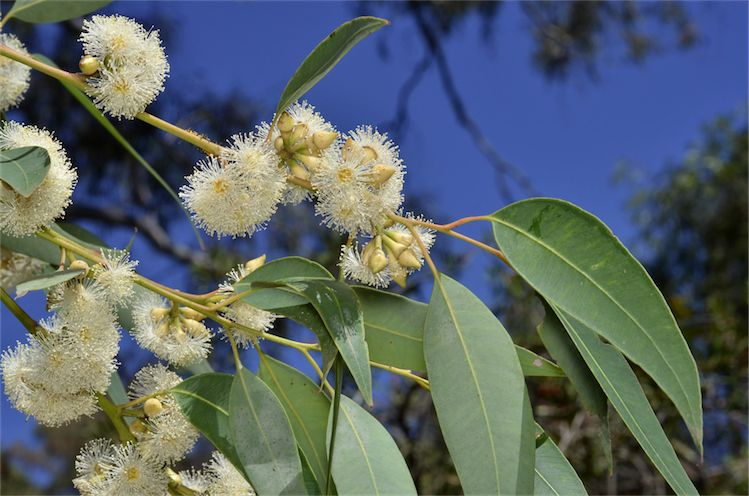
Leaves, flowers and flower buds

Eucalyptus notabilis, commonly known as Blue Mountains mahogany or mountain mahogany, is a species of small to medium-sized tree endemic to eastern Australia. It has rough, fibrous bark on the trunk and branches, lance-shaped to curved adult leaves, flower buds in groups of between seven and eleven, white flowers and hemispherical or conical fruit.

== Description ==
Eucalyptus notabilis is a tree, rarely a mallee, that typically grows to a height of 30 m (98 ft) and forms a lignotuber. It has persistent, rough, stringy, grey to reddish brown bark on the trunk and branches. Young plants and coppice regrowth have dull green leaves that are paler on the lower surface, 70–130 mm (2.8–5.1 in) long and 18–45 mm (0.71–1.77 in) wide and petiolate. Adult leaves are lance-shaped to curved, glossy green on the upper surface, paler below, 70–190 mm (2.8–7.5 in) long and 15–33 mm (0.59–1.30 in) wide, tapering to a petiole 10–35 mm (0.39–1.38 in) long. The flower buds are arranged in leaf axils in groups of seven, nine or eleven on an unbranched peduncle 5–15 mm (0.20–0.59 in) long, the individual buds sessile or on pedicels up to 5 mm (0.20 in) long. Mature buds are oval to pear-shaped, 8–12 mm (0.31–0.47 in) long and 5–7 mm (0.20–0.28 in) wide with a conical to rounded or beaked operculum. Flowering has been recorded in October and the flowers are white. The fruit is a woody hemispherical or conical capsule 4–9 mm (0.16–0.35 in) long and 7–10 mm (0.28–0.39 in) wide with the valves strongly protruding.

== Taxonomy and naming ==
Eucalyptus notabilis was first formally described in 1920 by Joseph Maiden in Journal and Proceedings of the Royal Society of New South Wales from specimens collected at Glenbrook by Richard Cambage and Maiden. The specific epithet (notabilis) is a Latin word meaning "noteworthy", referring to the stature of some examples of this species. Maiden referred to it as "a handsome species".

== Distribution and habitat ==
Blue Mountains mahogany grows at high altitude in dry forest and occurs in disjunct areas between the Lamington Plateau in south-eastern Queensland, the Gibraltar Range and the Blue Mountains.
