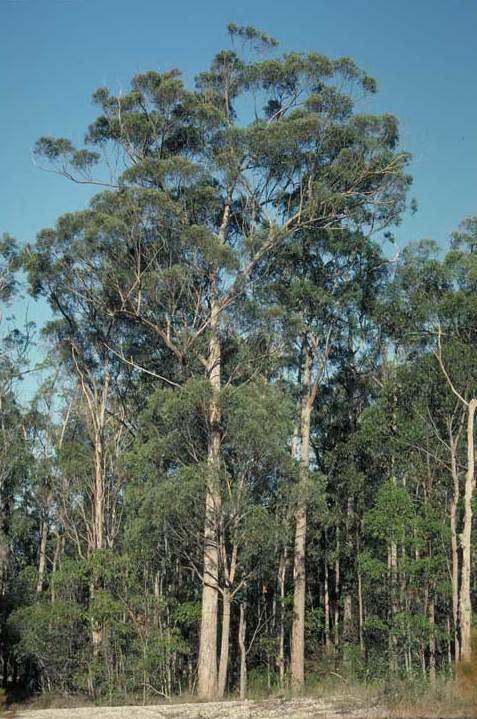

Scientific classification
- Kingdom: Plantae
- Clade: Embryophytes
- Clade: Tracheophytes
- Clade: Spermatophytes
- Clade: Angiosperms
- Clade: Eudicots
- Clade: Rosids
- Order: Myrtales
- Family: Myrtaceae
- Genus: Eucalyptus
- Species: E. carnea

Binomial name
- Eucalyptus carnea R.T.Baker

Synonyms
- Eucalyptus acmenioides var. carnea Maiden orth. var.; Eucalyptus acmenoides var. carnea (R.T.Baker) Maiden; Eucalyptus umbra subsp. carnea (R.T.Baker) L.A.S.Johnson

= Eucalyptus carnea =

Thick-leaved mahogany

Species of eucalyptus

Eucalyptus carnea, known as the thick-leaved mahogany or broad-leaved white mahogany, is a species of tree that is endemic to coastal areas of eastern Australia. It has rough, stringy bark from the trunk to the thinnest branches, lance-shaped or curved adult leaves, flower buds in groups of between seven and eleven, white flowers and cup-shaped to hemispherical fruit.

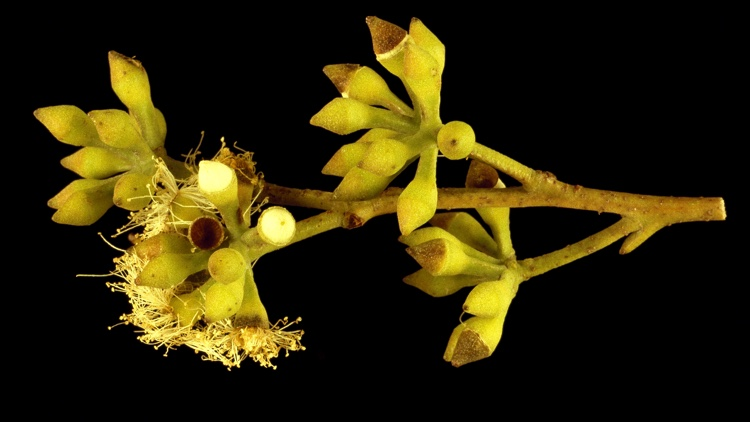
Flower buds

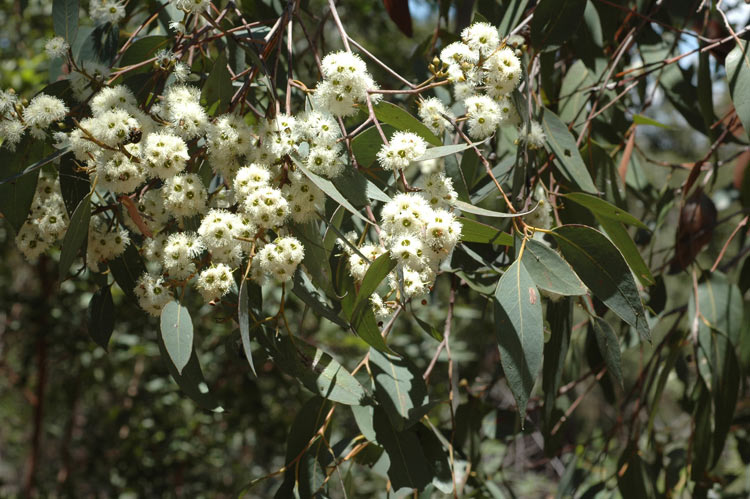
Foliage and flowers

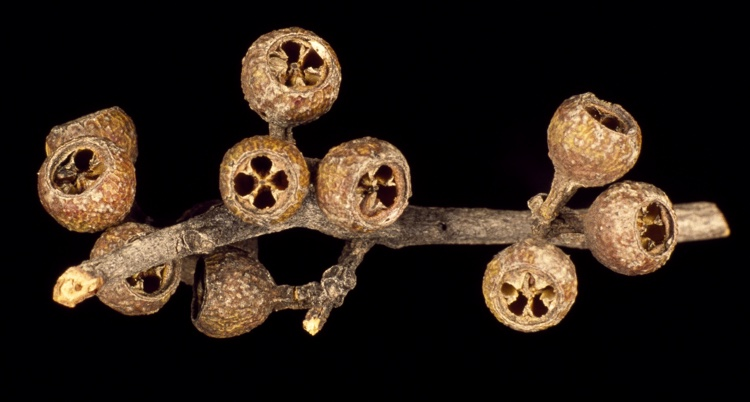
Fruit

== Description ==
Eucalyptus carnea is a tree that grows to a height of 25–30 metres (82–98 ft) and forms a lignotuber. It has rough grey or brownish, stringy or fibrous bark from the trunk to the thinnest branches. Young plants and coppice regrowth have leaves arranged in opposite pairs, lance-shaped to curved, 80–200 mm (3.1–7.9 in) long, 35–100 mm (1–4 in) wide and a different shade on either side. Adult leaves are lance-shaped or curved, 80–170 mm (3.1–6.7 in) long and 17–40 mm (0.7–2 in) wide on a petiole 10–20 mm (0.39–0.79 in) long. The leaves are bluish green on one side and a lighter green on the other. The flowers are borne in groups of seven, nine or eleven in leaf axils on a sometimes branched peduncle, 10–22 mm (0.39–0.87 in) long, the individual buds on a pedicel 3–7 mm (0.12–0.28 in) long. Mature buds are oval to spindle-shaped, 6–7 mm (0.24–0.28 in) long and 3–4 mm (0.1–0.2 in) wide with a conical to slightly beaked operculum. Flowering mainly occurs from September to November and the flowers are white. The fruit is a woody, hemispherical or shortened spherical capsule 3–7 mm (0.12–0.28 in) long and 5–8 mm (0.2–0.3 in) wide with the valves about level with the rim.

== Taxonomy and naming ==
Eucalyptus carnea was first formally described by the botanist Richard Thomas Baker in 1906 from specimens collected near the Richmond River by William Baeuerlen, (previously known as Wilhelm Bäuerlen). The description was published in Proceedings of the Linnean Society of New South Wales. The specific epithet (carnea) is a Latin word meaning "of flesh", possibly referring to the colour of the heartwood.

Eucalyptus carnea is part of the white mahogany group as recognised by Ken Hill. Others in the group include E. acmenoides, E. mediocris, E. apothalassica, E. helidonica, E. latisinensis, E. psammitica and E. umbra.

== Distribution and habitat ==
Thick-leaved mahogany grows in forest in shallow soil between Gympie in Queensland and the Hunter River in New South Wales.
