= Victor Ekpuk =

Nigerian artist

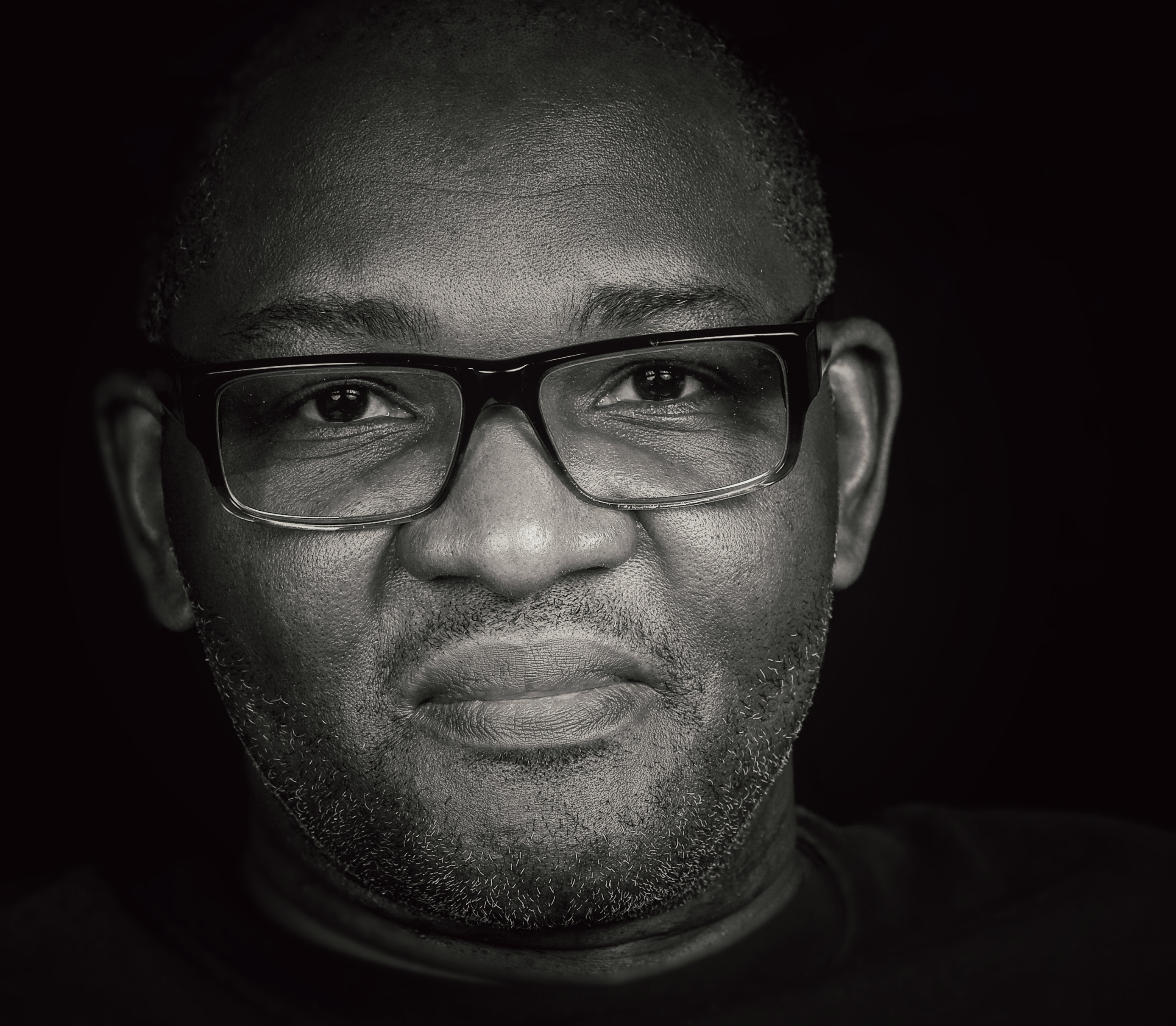
Artist Victor Ekpuk

Victor Ekpuk (born 1964) is a Nigerian-born artist from Uyo in Akwa Ibom State. He is currently based in Washington, D.C. Ekpuk came to prominence through his paintings and drawings, which reflect indigenous African philosophies of the Nsibidi and Uli art forms.

== Early Life and Influences ==
Born in southern Nigeria, Victor Ekpuk's contemporary artwork draws upon early visual influences from the male-oriented Ekpe secret society found within the South-South and South-Eastern region.

== Work ==
Leon on Me (2000), The Phillips Collection

Ekpuk's work frequently explores the human condition of identity in society. It draws upon a wider spectrum of meaning that is rooted in African and global contemporary art discourses. In 1989 Victor received his Bachelor of Fine Art degree (BFA), Obafemi Awolowo University, Ife, Nigeria, where he first explored the aesthetic philosophies of Nsibidi. Its economy of lines and encoded meanings led him to further explore drawing as writing, and to the invention of Ekpuk's own Glyphs. In a 2017 issue of Diaspora Quarterly, Visual Collaborative cited Ekpuk's work on the heritage of Africa art. In 1991, Ekpuk joined the Daily Times Nigeria (DTN), a government-controlled media outlet. Ekpuk joined DTN as an illustrator between June 17, 1991, and October 29, 1997, at the Daily Times of Nigeria, and was responsible for developing visual material for columns in the Daily Times and its related publications. Despite the tense political climate, arising from authoritarian military rule in Nigeria, Ekpuk delivered several thought-provoking satirical designs that traversed the political terrain in the country. His unique style consisted of political cartooning and his own unique Nsibidi inspired illustration. A notable example of illustrations from Ekpuk's time with DTN are from The New Agenda: Behind Abacha’s Game-Plan, an article covering the bloodless coup d'état that removed Ibrahim Babangida from his seat as military head of state.

== Collections ==
His artworks are in private and public collections, such as Smithsonian Institution National Museum of African Art, Newark Museum, The World Bank, University of Maryland University College, Hood Museum, United States Art in Embassies Art Collection and the Fidelity Investment Art Collection.

== Exhibitions ==
Ekpuk's work have been featured at venues including: Krannert Art Museum, Champaign, Illinois; The Fowler Museum, Los Angeles; Museum of Art and Design (MAD), New York City; Newark Museum, New Jersey; The World Bank, Washington DC; Smithsonian Institution, National Museum of African Art, Washington DC; New Museum of Contemporary Art, New York City; Johannesburg Biennial, South Africa.

- 2025: Looking Back and Forward, Aicon Gallery, New York
- 2025: The Dancer, Logan Circle, Washington, DC
- 2017: Treasures of Islam In Africa From Timbuktu to Zanzibar, Institut Du Monde Arabe, Paris, France
- 2017: These Moments", Morton Fine Art, Washington, DC
- 2016: "Drawing Memory", Sixfold Symmetry, Pattern in Art and Science, Frances Young Tang Teaching Museum, Skidmore College, Saratoga Springs, New York
- 2015: Portraits: A solo exhibition by Victor Ekpuk, Sulger-Buel Lovell Gallery, Surrey Row, London (29 September – 24 October)
- 2014: Auto-Graphics: Recent Drawings by Victor Ekpuk, Krannert Art Museum, University of Illinois at Urbana-Champaign (24 January – 27 July)
- 2013: Reminiscences and Current Musings, Morton Fine Art, Washington DC, USA (13 September – 8 October)
- 2013: Drawing Memories, Turchin Center for Art, Appalachian State University, North Carolina, USA
- 2011: Drawing Metaphors, James Madison University, Harrisonburg, Virginia, USA
- 2009: Of Lines and Life, The Richard F. Brush Gallery, University of St. Lawrence, Canton, New York
- 2009: Victor Ekpuk, Long View Gallery, Washington DC, USA
- 2008: Open Studio, Thami Mnyele Foundation, Amsterdam, the Netherlands
- 2006: Drawing From Within, Galerie 23, Amsterdam, the Netherlands
- 2005: Storylines: Drawings of Victor Ekpuk, Montgomery College, Takoma Park, Maryland, USA
- 2004: Trans/Script: The Art of Victor Ekpuk, Brandeis University, Boston, Massachusetts, USA
- 1998: Songs, 18th Street Arts Complex, Santa Monica, California, USA. (Sponsored by The Rockefeller Foundation, UNESCO-ASCHBERG Bursaries for Artists and 18th Street Arts Complex International Circle)
- 1995: Windsongs, French Cultural Center, Lagos, Nigeria
