= Anacostia Arts Center =

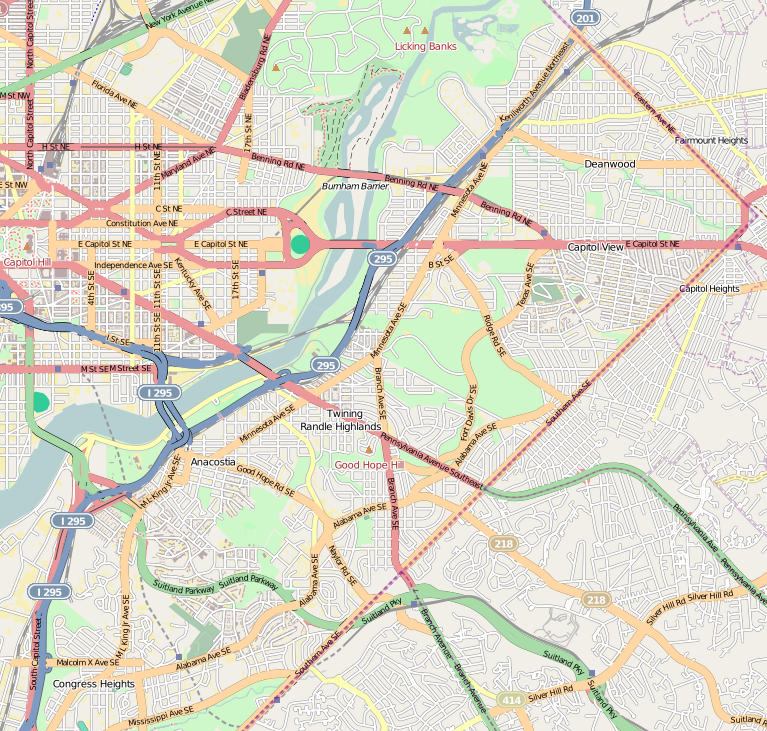
- Location within Washington, D.C.
- Established: June 22, 2013
- Location: 1231 Good Hope Road SE, Washington, D.C.
- Coordinates: 38.866947°N 76.9887078°W
- Public transit access: Anacostia
- Website: anacostiaartscenter.com

The Anacostia Arts Center is a multi-use arts space located at 1231 Good Hope Road SE in the Anacostia Historic District of Washington, D.C. Anacostia Arts Center, also known as the AAC, is a home for the arts, culture, and small businesses, where the physical space is used to employ and nourish the local arts and creative economy. Within the Anacostia Art Center, community members will find our Black Box Theater, a café, and a lounge area. On the lower level, you will meet the entrepreneurs participating in the co-working space, The HIVE, dedicated to supporting and employing the local arts and creative economy.

The arts center was acquired by the Washington Area Community Investment Fund (Wacif), a non-profit community development financial institution, in December 2021. The space will continue to honor the AAC's importance to the creative economy, providing resources for small businesses alongside an expanded Black Box Theatre, a marketplace, and co-working and art gallery spaces.

== History ==
The building in which the Anacostia Arts Center currently resides was originally purchased by the Margolis family in the 1930s. The family was well-known at the time for owning a great deal of property in the area. 1231 Good Hope Road encompassed three buildings at the time, one of which was leased to the discount retail chain Woolworth for much of the 20th century.

In the 1980s, Woolworths across the country started struggling financially, and in May 1999, the Anacostia location went out of business. As a result, the Margolis grandchildren sold the property. In 2011 the space transitioned from the lower level of the building to a small business incubator. Community residents reacted negatively to the job training center as many believed Anacostia did not need another social service agency. In response to this outcry, the upper level of the building also became an incubator for small businesses in January 2013.

Wacif acquired the AAC in December 2021 to drive equity and opportunity while honoring and uplifting support for the creative economy. Through this project, Wacif will deliver on its mission to drive economic opportunity east of the Anacostia River and increase programming tailored to entrepreneurs of color.
