= 1946 Lane Dragons football team =

American college football season

1946 Lane Dragons football

Cattle Bowl, L 0–7 vs.Arkansas AM&N
- Conference: Southern Intercollegiate Athletic Conference
- Record: 8–2 (6–0 SIAC)
- Head coach: Edward Clemons (10th season)
- Home stadium: Lane College Athletic Field, Rothrock Stadium

1946 Southern Intercollegiate Athletic Conference football standings
	Conf.					Overall
Team	W		L		T	W		L		T
No. 8 Florida A&M $	6	–	0	–	0	6	–	4	–	1
No. 5 Lane	6	–	0	–	0	8	–	2	–	0
No. 3 Tuskegee	5	–	1	–	0	10	–	2	–	0
No. 14 South Carolina State	4	–	3	–	1	5	–	3	–	1
No. 16 Morris Brown	3	–	2	–	1	4	–	4	–	1
No. 12 Xavier (LA)	1	–	1	–	0	4	–	2	–	0
Knoxville	2	–	2	–	3	4	–	3	–	3
No. 17 Benedict	3	–	3	–	0	5	–	5	–	0
No. 20 Alabama State	3	–	4	–	1	4	–	4	–	1
No. 18 Clark (GA)	2	–	3	–	0	3	–	5	–	0
No. 22 Morehouse	1	–	4	–	3	1	–	4	–	3
Alabama A&M	2	–	4	–	1	3	–	4	–	1
No. 15 Fisk	0	–	3	–	1	3	–	4	–	1
LeMoyne	0	–	3	–	1	2	–	3	–	1
Fort Valley State	0	–	5	–	0	0	–	9	–	0
$ – Conference champion; Standings were based on Dickinson System ratings.; Rankings from Pittsburgh Courier Dickinson System

The 1946 Lane Dragons football team, also sometimes known as the "Red Dragons", was an American football team that represented Lane College in the Southern Intercollegiate Athletic Conference (SIAC) during the 1947 college football season. In their 10th season under head coach Edward Clemons, the Dragons compiled an 8–2 record (6–0 against SIAC opponents), lost to Arkansas AM&N in the Cattle Bowl, gave up only 3.5 points per game on defense, and outscored opponents by a total of 189 to 35.

The Dickinson System rated Lane as the No. 5 black college football team for 1946, behind No. 1 Tennessee A&I, No. 2 Morgan State, No. 3 Tuskegee, and No. 4 Wilberforce. Lane ranked first among the black college teams in scoring defense.

The team played its home games at Lane College Athletic Field and Rothrock Field, both located in Jackson, Tennessee.

== Schedule ==
Date	Time	Opponent	Site	Result	Attendance	Source
September 21		Fort Benning*	Rothrock Stadium; Jackson, TN	W 26–6		
October 5		at Alabama State	Montgomery, AL	W 20–0		
October 12		South Carolina State	Rothrock Stadium; Jackson, TN	W 13–3		
October 26	8:00 p.m	Xavier (LA)	Rothrock Stadium; Jackson, TN	W 24–6		
November 2		at Alabama A&M	Normal, AL	W 28–0		
November 11	7:30 p.m.	vs. Lincoln (MO)*	Blues Stadium; Kansas City, MO (Mule Bowl)	L 6–7		
November 16		Miles*	Jackson, TN	W 20–0		
November 23		at Morehouse	Atlanta, GA	W 25–0		
November 28		at LeMoyne	Memphis, TN	W 27–0		
January 1, 1947	2:30 p.m.	vs. Arkansas AM&N*	LaGrave Field; Fort Worth, TX (Cattle Bowl)	L 0–7		
*Non-conference game; All times are in Central time
