= Eugene "Eda" Wade =

American muralist (1939–2021)

Eugene "Eda" Wade (November 27, 1939 – April 15, 2021), sometimes written as Eugene "Edaw" Wade, was an African American muralist, educator, and artist mainly based in Chicago, Illinois. His artworks concentrated on Black power and Afrocentric themes. He was also an active member in the Black Arts Movement.

== Early years ==
Eugene "Eda" Wade was born in Scotlandville, Baton Rouge, Louisiana. Wade was educated in Southern University, class of 1964, with a Bachelor of Science degree in Art Education.

In his early years, he gave himself the nickname and artwork signature "Edaw", which is his last name spelled backwards. Later, "Edaw" is often shortened into "Eda".

== Career ==
After graduating from Southern University, Wade spent the first five years working as an art educator. He spent a year educating in Leesburg, Florida. He then moved to Chicago, where he spent four years teaching at Mckinley Upper Grade Center.

In 1969, Wade returned to study in painting. He spent the next two years at Howard University, in Washington D.C. and received a Master of Fine Arts degree in Painting.

Following his graduation, Wade made a move back to Chicago in 1971, and became a Chicago Artist-in Residence as a muralist. In 1979, he started teaching at Kennedy King College, until his retirement in 2005.

After retirement from Kennedy King College, Wade returned to Louisiana and settled down in Zachary. He spent three years of retirement, but then return to part-time teaching for Art Appreciation at Southern University and Baton Rouge Community College.

== Notable works ==
=== Wall of Respect (1967) ===
Wade is credited for the alternation of Chicago's landmark — Wall of Respect, located at East 43rd Street and South Langley Avemuein on a two-story building. The Wall of Respect was an outdoor mural organized by the Visual Arts Workshop of the Organization of Black American Culture(OBAC) in 1967. Wade was invited by William "Bill" Walker to repaint sections of the mural. The project was one of the first and largest Black Power collaborative mural, which later inspired ethnic murals internationally. The Wall of Respect no longer stands today, as it was destroyed by a fire in 1971.

=== Wall of Dignity (1968) ===
Wade is credited in the creation of the Wall of Dignity, along with William "Bill" Walker. The mural is located at the Mack Avenue and Lilibridge Street, Detroit. In 1968, Bill Walker and Wade were reached out by Frank Ditto to create a mural for his local community, in response to Detroit's violent racial rebellion in 1967. The artists were asked to create a piece that would reflect the solidarity of the Black Community during the harsh time. The piece explores themes such as emancipation, resistance, diaspora and rights.

=== Wall of Meditation (1970) ===
In 1970, Wade painted the Wall of Meditation on the outer facade of the Olivet Community Center. This mural depicts renowned African-American activists such as Martin Luther King Jr., and Malcolm X at the center of the composition. The mural also includes Egyptian motifs, with Egyptian figures and symbols placed on the left. On the right, slaves breaks free from their chains, symbolizing freedom.

=== Doors for Malcolm X College (1971) ===
In 1971, Wade painted murals on 32 doors for the now demolished Malcolm X College. The murals were painted on steel fire doors, which took him a total of 2 years to complete the project. The artist derived motifs from Black culture, Egyptian and West African Designs. For the Black Arts Movement in Chicago, these doors celebrates their historical pride, and became a monumental landmark for the local community.

In 2017, the 32 doors were united and exhibited in the Chicago Cultural Center at the Sidney R. Yates Hall.

=== Cramton Auditorium Mural (1976) ===
The Cramton Auditorium Mural was created in 1976 at Howard University in Washington D.C. Howard University's Fine Arts program encourages its students to engage in politics and its analysis. Wade painted famous African-American abolitionists such as Frederick Douglass and Harriet Tubman, Malcolm X and Martin Luther King Jr.

== Later years ==
At the age of 81 (on April 15, 2021), Eugene "Edaw" Wade died from natural causes in his home town – Baton Rouge. Wade is survived by his daughters Martha A. Wade, Jessica Scott-Wade, Elizabeth J. Wade., Ivy Scott-Wade. Two sons Durand and Manaseh, his brother Robert, and five grandchildren. A memorial in Chicago was held later that year in June, which featured Wade's videos and art works.
