= Fundi (Billy) Abernathy =

American photographer (1939–2016)

- Born: Billy Abernathy; 1939
- Died: 2017 (aged 77–78)
- Other name: Fundi Abernathy
- Occupation: Photographer
- Notable work: Wall of Respect
- Spouse: Laini (Sylvia) Abernathy (died 2010)

Billy Abernathy (1939–2017) was an American photographer. He was married to Laini (Sylvia) Abernathy, an artist and activist.

== History ==
During his lifetime, he officially changed him name to Fundi. Billy (Fundi) Abernathy was associated with the AfriCOBRA.

Around the 1970s, he and his wife Sylvia bth changed their names – to Fundi Abernathy and Laini Abernathy – with the purpose of "africanizing their name". Alongside his wife, Abernathy worked documenting African-American Black culture in the South Side of Chicago. Billy (Fundi) Abernathy was associated with the AfriCOBRA, a group of black artists who worked in Chicago seeking a way of bringing light to black communities in visual arts.

== Career ==
Billy Abernathy collaborated on the Wall of Respect, an outdoor mural, with his wife, Sylvia. He worked alongside artists Elliott Hunter and Jeff Donaldson on the Wall's "Jazz" section as well as the "Rhythm and Blues" section. Together, they worked on creating a photograph-based mural of The Wall scattered around different areas of Chicago. Abernathy was also associated with the Organization of Black American Culture (OBAC); he was one of the photographer members.

Fundi Abernathy was one of the photographers featured in the Art Institute's 2018 exhibit Never a Lovely So Real: Photography and Film in Chicago, 1950–1980. One of the featured photographs of Abernathy's was "The Screen", shot in 1967. Other works found in the Art Institute of Chicago are: "Mother's Day", "The Robe", and "Chicago". In 1966, he photographed for the cover of the Roscoe Mitchell Sextet's debut album, Sound (on the Delmark label), which his wife designed. Fundi also worked on the multi-media book In Our Terribleness with Amiri Baraka.

Abernathy's work was included in the 2025 exhibition Photography and the Black Arts Movement, 1955–1985 at the National Gallery of Art.
