= 1946 Southern Jaguars football team =

American college football season

1946 Southern Jaguars football

SWAC champion

Yam Bowl, W 64–7 vs. Tuskegee
- Conference: Southwestern Athletic Conference
- Record: 9–2–1 (5–1 SWAC)
- Head coach: Ace Mumford (11th season)
- Home stadium: University Stadium

1946 Southwestern Athletic Conference football standings
	Conf.					Overall
Team	W		L		T	W		L		T
No. 7 Southern $	5	–	1	–	0	9	–	2	–	1
No. 12 Wiley	4	–	2	–	0	6	–	3	–	1
No. 6 Arkansas AM&N	3	–	2	–	1	8	–	2	–	1
No. 9 Prairie View A&M	2	–	2	–	2	7	–	2	–	2
No. 13 Texas College	3	–	3	–	0	5	–	4	–	1
No. 22 Langston	2	–	4	–	0	2	–	6	–	1
No. 23 Samuel Huston	0	–	5	–	1	3	–	5	–	2
$ – Conference champion; Rankings from Pittsburgh Courier Dickinson System

The 1946 Southern Jaguars football team was an American football team that represented Southern University as a member of the Southwestern Athletic Conference (SWAC) during the 1946 college football season. In their 11th season under head coach Ace Mumford, the Jaguars compiled a 9–2–1 record, won the SWAC championship, shut out four of 12 opponents, and outscored all opponents by a total of 390 to 95.

The Dickinson System rated Southern in a tie with Lincoln (MO) as the No. 7 black college football team for 1946. Southern ranked first in scoring offense among the black college teams with an average of 30.75 point per game.

Southern tackle Robert Smith was selected as a first-team player on The Pittsburgh Courier's 1946 All-America team. In addition, Fontenberry was named to the second team as a guard, and back Keyes was named to the third team as a back.

The team played its home games at University Stadium in Scotlandville, Louisiana (which has since been annexed into the Baton Rouge city limits).

== Schedule ==
Date	Time	Opponent	Site	Result	Attendance	Source
September 27		at Houston College*	Buffalo Stadium; Houston, TX	T 0–0		
October 5		Grambling*	University Stadium; Scotlandville, LA (rivalry)	W 38–0		
October 12		Samuel Huston	University Stadium; Scotlandville, LA	W 65–0		
October 19		at Arkansas AM&N	Athletic Field; Pine Bluff, AR	L 7–9		
October 26		Langston	University Stadium; Scotlandville, LA	W 50–7		
November 2	2:00 p.m.	at Texas College	Steer Stadium; Tyler, TX	W 19–18		
November 9		Tennessee A&I*	University Stadium; Scotlandville, LA	L 20–21		
November 15		vs. Wiley	Buffalo Stadium; Houston, TX	W 19–7		
November 23		Florida A&M*	University Stadium; Scotlandville, LA	W 38–19		
November 30		at Prairie View A&M	Blackshear Field; Prairie View, TX	W 35–0		
December 7		at Xavier (LA)*	Xavier Stadium; New Orleans, LA	W 35–7		
December 25		vs. Tuskegee*	Dal-Hi Stadium; Dallas, TX (Yam Bowl)	W 64–7	5,000	
*Non-conference game; All times are in Central time
