= 1946 North Carolina College Eagles football team =

American college football season

1946 North Carolina College Eagles football
- Conference: Colored Intercollegiate Athletic Association
- Record: 7–3 (5–3 CIAA)
- Head coach: Herman Riddick (2nd season)
- Home stadium: O'Kelly Field

1946 Colored Intercollegiate Athletic Association football standings
	Conf.					Overall
Team	W		L		T	W		L		T
No. 2 Morgan State $	7	–	0	–	0	8	–	0	–	0
No. 10 West Virginia State	5	–	2	–	0	6	–	3	–	1
Virginia State	5	–	2	–	0	7	–	2	–	0
No. 16 Howard	6	–	2	–	0	6	–	3	–	0
No. 20 Lincoln (PA)	4	–	2	–	0	6	–	3	–	0
No. 16 North Carolina College	5	–	3	–	0	7	–	3	–	0
No. 18 North Carolina A&T	3	–	4	–	0	4	–	4	–	0
No. 19 Shaw	3	–	3	–	1	5	–	3	–	1
Delaware State	3	–	4	–	0	5	–	4	–	0
No. 22 Hampton	4	–	4	–	0	4	–	4	–	0
No. 18 Bluefield State	3	–	4	–	1	4	–	4	–	1
Winston-Salem State	1	–	4	–	1	3	–	5	–	1
No. 22 Virginia Union	1	–	5	–	1	3	–	5	–	1
Johnson C. Smith	0	–	6	–	2	0	–	7	–	2
Saint Paul's (VA)	0	–	6	–	0	0	–	6	–	0
St. Augustine's	1	–	0	–	0	3	–	1	–	0
$ – Conference champion; Conference standings were based on the Dickinson System. St. Augustine's did not play the six conference games required to be eligible for the conference standings.

The 1946 North Carolina College Eagles football team was an American football team that represented North Carolina College in the Colored Intercollegiate Athletic Association (CIAA) during the 1946 college football season. In their second season under head coach Herman Riddick, the Eagles compiled a 7–3 record (5–3 against CIAA opponents) and outscored all opponents by a total of 230 to 55.

The Dickinson System rated North Carolina College in a tie for No. 16 among the black college football teams for 1946.

== Schedule ==
Date	Opponent	Site	Result	Attendance	Source
September 21	Fort Jackson*	O'Kelly Field; Durham, NC	W 85–0		
September 28	at Delaware State	Dover, DE	W 32–6		
October 5	Bluefield State	O'Kelly Field; Durham, NC	W 19–0		
October 12	at Winston-Salem State	Bowman Gray Stadium; Winston-Salem, NC	W 26–0		
October 19	at North Carolina A&T	World War Memorial Stadium; Greensboro, NC (rivalry)	L 0–17	7,500	
October 26	Virginia Union	O'Kelly Field; Durham, NC	W 13–0		
November 2	vs. Tennessee A&I*	Griffith Stadium; Washington, DC	W 14–6	22,000	
November 9	Johnson C. Smith	O'Kelly Field; Durham, NC	W 29–0		
November 23	at Virginia State	Rogers Stadium; Ettrick, VA	L 6–14		
November 28	at Shaw	Chavis Park; Raleigh, NC	L 6–12		
*Non-conference game
