= 1946 South Carolina State Bulldogs football team =

American college football season

1946 South Carolina State Bulldogs football

Pecan Bowl champion

Pecan Bowl, W 13–6 vs. Johnson C. Smith
- Conference: Southern Intercollegiate Athletic Conference
- Record: 5–3–1 (4–3–1 SIAC)
- Head coach: Oliver C. Dawson (7th season)
- Home stadium: State College Stadium

1946 Southern Intercollegiate Athletic Conference football standings
	Conf.					Overall
Team	W		L		T	W		L		T
No. 8 Florida A&M $	6	–	0	–	0	6	–	4	–	1
No. 5 Lane	6	–	0	–	0	8	–	2	–	0
No. 3 Tuskegee	5	–	1	–	0	10	–	2	–	0
No. 14 South Carolina State	4	–	3	–	1	5	–	3	–	1
No. 16 Morris Brown	3	–	2	–	1	4	–	4	–	1
No. 12 Xavier (LA)	1	–	1	–	0	4	–	2	–	0
Knoxville	2	–	2	–	3	4	–	3	–	3
No. 17 Benedict	3	–	3	–	0	5	–	5	–	0
No. 20 Alabama State	3	–	4	–	1	4	–	4	–	1
No. 18 Clark (GA)	2	–	3	–	0	3	–	5	–	0
No. 22 Morehouse	1	–	4	–	3	1	–	4	–	3
Alabama A&M	2	–	4	–	1	3	–	4	–	1
No. 15 Fisk	0	–	3	–	1	3	–	4	–	1
LeMoyne	0	–	3	–	1	2	–	3	–	1
Fort Valley State	0	–	5	–	0	0	–	9	–	0
$ – Conference champion; Standings were based on Dickinson System ratings.; Rankings from Pittsburgh Courier Dickinson System

The 1946 South Carolina State Bulldogs football team represented South Carolina State University as a member of the Southern Intercollegiate Athletic Conference (SIAC) during the 1946 college football season. In their seventh season under head coach Oliver C. Dawson, the Bulldogs compiled an overall record of 5–3–1 with a mark of 4–3–1 in conference play and outscored opponents by a total of 146 to 82. In December 1946, the Pittsburgh Courier applied the Dickinson System to the black college teams and rated South Carolina State at No. 14.

The team played home games in Orangeburg, South Carolina.

== Schedule ==
Date	Opponent	Site	Result	Attendance	Source
October 5	Knoxville	State College Stadium; Orangeburg, SC	T 7–7		
October 12	at Lane	Rothrock Field; Jackson, TN	L 3–13		
October 19	at Fort Valley State	Fort Valley, GA	W 41–0		
October 26	Alabama A&M	State College Stadium; Orangeburg, SC	W 26–0	500	
November 2	Morris Brown	State College Stadium; Orangeburg, SC	W 7–0	3,000	
November 9	Morehouse	State College Stadium; Orangeburg, SC	L 13–26		
November 16	at Tuskegee	Alumni Bowl; Tuskegee, AL	L 14–30		
November 28	Benedict	State College Stadium; Orangeburg, SC	W 22–0		
December 7	Johnson C. Smith*	State College Stadium; Orangeburg, SC (Pecan Bowl)	W 13–6	4,000	
*Non-conference game
