= 1946 Florida A&M Rattlers football team =

American college football season

1946 Florida A&M Rattlers football

SIAC champion

Orange Blossom Classic, L 14–20 vs. Lincoln (PA) Angel Bowl, T 6–6 vs. Wiley
- Conference: Southern Intercollegiate Athletic Conference
- Record: 6–4–1 (6–0 SIAC)
- Head coach: Jake Gaither (2nd season)
- Home stadium: Sampson-Bragg Field

1946 Southern Intercollegiate Athletic Conference football standings
	Conf.					Overall
Team	W		L		T	W		L		T
No. 8 Florida A&M $	6	–	0	–	0	6	–	4	–	1
No. 5 Lane	6	–	0	–	0	8	–	2	–	0
No. 3 Tuskegee	5	–	1	–	0	10	–	2	–	0
No. 14 South Carolina State	4	–	3	–	1	5	–	3	–	1
No. 16 Morris Brown	3	–	2	–	1	4	–	4	–	1
No. 12 Xavier (LA)	1	–	1	–	0	4	–	2	–	0
Knoxville	2	–	2	–	3	4	–	3	–	3
No. 17 Benedict	3	–	3	–	0	5	–	5	–	0
No. 20 Alabama State	3	–	4	–	1	4	–	4	–	1
No. 18 Clark (GA)	2	–	3	–	0	3	–	5	–	0
No. 22 Morehouse	1	–	4	–	3	1	–	4	–	3
Alabama A&M	2	–	4	–	1	3	–	4	–	1
No. 15 Fisk	0	–	3	–	1	3	–	4	–	1
LeMoyne	0	–	3	–	1	2	–	3	–	1
Fort Valley State	0	–	5	–	0	0	–	9	–	0
$ – Conference champion; Standings were based on Dickinson System ratings.; Rankings from Pittsburgh Courier Dickinson System

The 1946 Florida A&M Rattlers football team was an American football team that represented Florida A&M College as a member of the Southern Intercollegiate Athletic Conference (SIAC) during the 1946 college football season. In their second season under head coach Jake Gaither, the Rattlers compiled a 6–3–1 record (6–0 against SIAC opponents), and won the SIAC championship, and appeared in two post-season games, losing to Lincoln (PA) in the Orange Blossom Classic and tying Wiley in the Angel Bowl.

The Dickinson System rated Florida A&M as the No. 8 black college football team for 1946.

Florida A&M end Nathaniel "Traz" Powell was selected as a first-team player on The Pittsburgh Courier's 1946 All-America team. Three others were named to the second team: end Mitchell; tackle Brewington; and back Theodore "Ted" Montgomery. The team's quarterback was "Big Jim" Williams.

The Rattlers played their home games at Sampson-Bragg Field in Tallahassee, Florida.

== Schedule ==
Date	Opponent	Site	Result	Attendance	Source
October 5	vs. Wilberforce*	Tinker Field; Orlando, FL	L 14–22		
October 12	Alabama State	Sampson-Bragg Field; Tallahassee, FL	W 35–0		
October 19	at Morris Brown	Ponce de Leon Park; Atlanta, GA	W 7–0	5,000	
October 26	at Knoxville	Knoxville, TN	W 27–0		
November 2	vs. Kentucky State*	Durkee Field; Jacksonville, FL	L 6–14	5,000	
November 9	Tuskegee^{†}	Sampson-Bragg Field; Tallahassee, FL	W 21–20	5,000	
November 16	Clark	Sampson-Bragg Field; Tallahassee, FL	W 32–0		
November 23	at Southern*	University Stadium; Scotlandville, LA	L 19–38		
November 30	Fisk	Centennial Field; Tallahassee, FL	W 18–0	3,000–4,000	
December 7	vs. Lincoln (PA)*	Phillips Field; Tampa, FL (Orange Blossom Classic)	L 14–20	> 9,000	
December 28	vs. Wiley*	Wrigley Field; Los Angeles, CA (Angel Bowl)	T 6–6	20,000	
*Non-conference game; ^{†}Homecoming
