= 1946 Xavier Gold Rush football team =

American college football season

1946 Xavier Gold Rush football
- Conference: Southern Intercollegiate Athletic Conference
- Record: 4–2 (1–1 SIAC)
- Head coach: Giles O. Wright (4th season)
- Home stadium: Xavier Stadium

1946 Southern Intercollegiate Athletic Conference football standings
	Conf.					Overall
Team	W		L		T	W		L		T
No. 8 Florida A&M $	6	–	0	–	0	6	–	4	–	1
No. 5 Lane	6	–	0	–	0	8	–	2	–	0
No. 3 Tuskegee	5	–	1	–	0	10	–	2	–	0
No. 14 South Carolina State	4	–	3	–	1	5	–	3	–	1
No. 16 Morris Brown	3	–	2	–	1	4	–	4	–	1
No. 12 Xavier (LA)	1	–	1	–	0	4	–	2	–	0
Knoxville	2	–	2	–	3	4	–	3	–	3
No. 17 Benedict	3	–	3	–	0	5	–	5	–	0
No. 20 Alabama State	3	–	4	–	1	4	–	4	–	1
No. 18 Clark (GA)	2	–	3	–	0	3	–	5	–	0
No. 22 Morehouse	1	–	4	–	3	1	–	4	–	3
Alabama A&M	2	–	4	–	1	3	–	4	–	1
No. 15 Fisk	0	–	3	–	1	3	–	4	–	1
LeMoyne	0	–	3	–	1	2	–	3	–	1
Fort Valley State	0	–	5	–	0	0	–	9	–	0
$ – Conference champion; Standings were based on Dickinson System ratings.; Rankings from Pittsburgh Courier Dickinson System

The 1946 Xavier Gold Rush football team represented Xavier University of Louisiana as a member of the Southern Intercollegiate Athletic Conference (SIAC) during the 1946 college football season. Led by head coach Giles O. Wright in his fourth and final season as head coach, the Gold Rush compiled a 4–2 record. They were ranked in a tie for No. 12 among the nation's black college football teams according to the Pittsburgh Courier and its Dickinson Rating System.

Wright resign his post at Xavier in December 1946, just after the conclusion of the season.

== Schedule ==
Date	Time	Opponent	Site	Result	Attendance	Source
October 19	2:30 p.m.	Benedict	Xavier Stadium; New Orleans, LA	W 34–12		
October 26	8:00 p.m.	at Lane	Rothrock Stadium; Jackson, TN	L 6–24		
November 2	2:00 p.m.	Bishop*	Xavier Stadium; New Orleans, LA	W 9–0		
November 16	2:00 p.m.	Houston College*^{†}	Xavier Stadium; New Orleans, LA	W 7–6		
November 28	2:00 p.m.	Dillard*	Xavier Stadium; New Orleans, LA	W 40–0		
December 7		Southern*	Xavier Stadium; New Orleans, LA	L 7–35	6,000	
*Non-conference game; ^{†}Homecoming; All times are in Central time
