= 1946 Kentucky State Thorobreds football team =

American college football season

1946 Kentucky State Thorobreds football
- Conference: Midwest Athletic Association
- Record: 5–4 (0–3 MWAA)
- Head coach: Robert White (1st season)
- Home stadium: Alumni Field

1946 Midwest Athletic Association football standings
	Conf.					Overall
Team	W		L		T	W		L		T
No. 1 Tennessee A&I $	3	–	0	–	0	10	–	1	–	0
No. 4 Wilberforce	2	–	1	–	1	5	–	2	–	2
No. 7 Lincoln (MO)	2	–	1	–	1	5	–	3	–	1
Philander Smith	0	–	2	–	0	1	–	9	–	0
No. 19 Kentucky State	0	–	3	–	0	5	–	4	–	0
$ – Conference champion; Rankings from Pittsburgh Courier Dickinson System

The 1946 Kentucky State Thorobreds football team was an American football team that represented Kentucky State Industrial College (now known as Kentucky State University) as a member of the Midwest Athletic Association (MWAA) during the 1946 college football season. Led by Robert White in his first and only season as head coach, the Thorobreds compiled a 5–4 record and outscored opponents by a total of 111 to 77.

In December 1946, The Pittsburgh Courier applied the Dickinson System to the black college teams and rated Kentucky State at No. 19.

The team played its home games at Alumni Field in Frankfort, Kentucky.

== Schedule ==
Date	Opponent	Site	Result	Attendance	Source
September 29	North Carolina A&T	Alumni Field; Frankfort, KY	W 7–0		
October 5	at Winston-Salem State	Winston-Salem, NC	W 27–6		
October 12	Lockbourne AFB		W 37–6		
October 19	Lincoln (MO)	Alumni Field; Frankfort, KY	L 0–7		
October 26	Texas College^{†}	Alumni Field; Frankfort, KY	L 7–26	6,000	
November 2	at Florida A&M	Durkee Field; Jacksonville, FL	W 14–6	5,000	
November 9	Wilberforce	Alumni Field; Frankfort, KY	L 6–7		
November 16	at Morris Brown	Atlanta, GA	W 13–0		
November 23	Tennessee A&I	Alumni Field; Frankfort, KY	L 0–19		
^{†}Homecoming
