= Darryl Cowherd =

American photographer

- Born: 1940 (age 85–86)
- Known for: Photography
- Movement: Black Arts Movement

Darryl Cowherd (born 1940) is an American photographer and writer known for his association with the Black Arts Movement.

Cowherd attended Roosevelt University and also studied in Europe. Cowherd settled in Chicago in 1964. He was a founding member of the Organization of Black American Culture and contributed to the 1967 South Side mural Wall of Respect.

Cowherd's work was included in the 2025 exhibition Photography and the Black Arts Movement, 1955–1985 at the National Gallery of Art. His photographs are in the collection of the Art Institute of Chicago, and the National Gallery of Art.
