= Robert White (American football) =

American football coach (1912–1969)

Biographical details
- Born: September 28, 1912; Richmond, Kentucky, U.S.
- Died: August 16, 1969 (aged 56); Washington, D.C., U.S.

Playing career
- 1930s: Kentucky State
- Position: Center

Coaching career (HC unless noted)
- 1946: Kentucky State
- 1950: Delaware State
- 1952–1955: Elizabeth City State
- 1957–1961: Howard

Administrative career (AD unless noted)
- 1966–1969: Washington Redskins (assistant director of player personnel)

Head coaching record
- Overall: 50–42–4

Accomplishments and honors

Championships
- 3 EIAC (1952–1954)

Robert Maurice White (September 28, 1912 – August 16, 1969) was an American college football coach. He was the ninth head football coach at Kentucky State University in Frankfort, Kentucky, serving for one season, in 1946, and compiling a record of 5–4.

White went on to coach at Delaware State University and Howard University.

White was later an assistant director of player personnel for the Washington Redskins. He died of cancer on August 16, 1969, at a hospital in Washington, D.C.

== Head coaching record ==
Year	Team	Overall	Conference	Standing	Bowl/playoffs
Kentucky State Thorobreds (Midwest Athletic Association) (1946)
1946	Kentucky State	5–4	0–3	5th	
Kentucky State:		5–4	0–3		
Delaware State Hornets (Central Intercollegiate Athletic Association) (1950)
1950	Delaware State	2–7–1	2–6–1	14th	
Delaware State:		2–7–1	2–6–1		
Elizabeth City State Pirates (Eastern Intercollegiate Athletic Conference) (1952–1955)
1952	Elizabeth City State	6–2	4–0	1st	
1953	Elizabeth City State	5–1–2	3–0–1	T–1st	
1954	Elizabeth City State	8–1	3–0	1st	
1955	Elizabeth City State	7–2	3–0	NA	
Elizabeth City State:		26–6–1	13–0–1		
Howard Bison (Central Intercollegiate Athletic Association) (1957–1961)
1957	Howard	3–6	2–4	15th	
1958	Howard	6–2–1	4–2	8th	
1959	Howard	3–5	2–4	T–13th	
1960	Howard	4–4	2–4	T–12th	
1961	Howard	1–8	1–5	13th	
Howard:		17–25–1	11–19		
Total:		50–42–4			
National championship Conference title Conference division title or championship game berth
