= 1946 Prairie View A&M Panthers football team =

American college football season

1946 Prairie View A&M Panthers football

Prairie View Bowl, W 14–0 vs. Lincoln (MO)
- Conference: Southwestern Athletic Conference
- Record: 6–2–2 (2–2–2 SWAC)
- Head coach: Billy Nicks (2nd season)
- Home stadium: Blackshear Field

1946 Southwestern Athletic Conference football standings
	Conf.					Overall
Team	W		L		T	W		L		T
No. 7 Southern $	6	–	0	–	0	9	–	2	–	1
No. 12 Wiley	4	–	2	–	0	6	–	3	–	1
No. 6 Arkansas AM&N	3	–	2	–	1	8	–	2	–	1
No. 9 Prairie View A&M	2	–	2	–	2	7	–	2	–	2
No. 13 Texas College	3	–	3	–	0	5	–	4	–	1
No. 22 Langston	2	–	4	–	0	2	–	6	–	1
No. 25 Bishop	2	–	4	–	1	4	–	3	–	1
No. 23 Samuel Huston	0	–	5	–	2	3	–	5	–	2
$ – Conference champion; Rankings from Pittsburgh Courier Dickinson System

The 1946 Prairie View A&M Panthers football team was an American football team that represented Prairie View A&M University in the Southwestern Athletic Conference (SWAC) during the 1946 college football season. In their second season under head coach Billy Nicks, the team compiled a 6–2–2 record (2–2–2 against SWAC opponents), defeated Lincoln (MO) in the Prairie View Bowl, and outscored opponents by a total of 153 to 85.

The Dickinson System rated Prairie View as the No. 9 black college football team for 1946.

== Schedule ==
Date	Time	Opponent	Site	Result	Attendance	Source
September 28	3:15 p.m.	at Samuel Huston	Anderson High School Field; Austin, TX	T 0–0		
October 5		Bergstrom AAFF*	Blackshear Field; Prairie View, TX	W 73–6		
October 14		vs. Wiley	Cotton Bowl; Dallas, TX (State Fair Classic)	L 0–19	22,000	
October 26		Arkansas AM&N	Blackshear Field; Prairie View, TX	T 7–7		
November 1		at Houston College*	Buffalo Stadium; Houston, TX	W 6–0		
November 9		Texas College	Blackshear Field; Prairie View, TX	W 12–0		
November 16		at Grambling*	Tiger Field; Grambling, LA	W 16–6		
November 23		vs. Langston	Jelsma Stadium; Guthrie, OK	W 25–12		
November 30	2:30 p.m.	Southern	Blackshear Field; Prairie View, TX	L 0–35		
January 1, 1947		vs. Lincoln (MO)*	Buffalo Stadium; Houston, TX (Prairie View Bowl)	W 14–0	1,500	
*Non-conference game; All times are in Central time
