= Giles O. Wright =

American sports coach, athletics administrator, educator (1899–1974)

Biographical details
- Born: November 13, 1899; Kansas, U.S.
- Died: July 22, 1974 (aged 74); Tyler, Texas, U.S.

Playing career

Football
- 1919–1921: Baker
- Position: Halfback

Coaching career (HC unless noted)

Football
- 1932: Sumner HS (KS) (assistant)
- 1934–1941: Xavier (LA) (assistant)
- 1942–1946: Xavier (LA)
- 1947–1948: Booker T. Washington HS (LA) (assistant)
- 1949: Texas College (assistant)
- 1956: Texas College

Basketball
- 1938–1946: Xavier (LA)
- ?: Texas College

Administrative career (AD unless noted)
- 1923–?: Kansas Vocational
- 1947–1949: Booker T. Washington HS (LA)
- ?: Texas College

Head coaching record
- Overall: 12–23–2 (football)

Giles Owens "Unc" Wright (November 13, 1899 – July 22, 1974) was an American football, basketball, and track coach, college athletics administrator, and educator. He served as the head football coach at Xavier University of Louisiana in New Orleans, from 1942 to 1946, and Texas College in Tyler, Texas, for one season, in 1956.

Wright graduated from high school in Baldwin, Kansas, in 1918. He attended Baker University, in Baldwin, where he played football alongside his brother, Ted A. Wright.

In 1922, Wright was hired by George R. Smith College in Sedalia, Missouri, to teach history, pedagogy, and athletics. The following year, he moved to Kansas Industrial and Educational Institute—later known as Kansas Technical Institute—in Topeka, Kansas, as athletic director. In 1932, Wright coached football at Sumner High School in Kansas City, Kansas, as an assistant to head coach Alexander T. Edwards.

After earning a Master of Arts degree from the University of Michigan, Wright joined his brother, Ted, at Xavier, in 1935, as physical director and assistant coach. He was the head basketball coach at Xavier from 1938 to 1946, compiling a record of 124–41. He resigned from his post at Xavier in December 1946. In 1949, Wright was hired by Texas College to serve as the first assistant football coach under Fred T. Long.

Wright died on July 22, 1974, at a hospital in Tyler, after suffering a stroke the prior day.

== Head coaching record ==
=== Football ===
Year	Team	Overall	Conference	Standing	Bowl/playoffs
Xavier Gold Rush (Southern Intercollegiate Athletic Conference) (1942–1946)
1942	Xavier	3–6	2–3	T–7th	
1943	Xavier	0–4–1	0–2	7th	
1944	Xavier	3–5	0–2		
1945	No team—World War II				
1946	Xavier	4–2	1–1	T–6th	
Xavier:		10–17–1	3–8		
Texas College Steers (Southwestern Athletic Conference) (1956)
1956	Texas College	2–6–1	0–5–1	T–6th	
Texas College:		2–6–1	0–5–1		
Total:		12–23–2			
