= Chicago Public Art Group =

US non-profit organization

- Bricolage technique in Growing (2008) on underpass wall, T. Van Duinen and T. Osborn, lead artists, Chicago Public Art Group
- Founded: 1971
- Founder: William Walker and John Pitman Weber
- Type: Independent public art organization
- Location(s): 3314 S. Marshfield Ave., 3B; Chicago, Illinois USA 60608
- Products: public art in a variety of media
- Services: Design, organization, education
- Method: Produce public art
- Key people: Chantal Healey, Executive Director
- Website: chicagopublicartgroup.org
- Formerly called: Chicago Mural Group

Chicago Public Art Group (originally Chicago Mural Group) is a non-profit cultural organization in Chicago that organizes and promotes creation of community public art. The Group was founded in 1971 and has been involved in the creation of hundreds of artworks in and around the city. CPAG supports the production of public murals, mosaics, sculptures and space designs in collaboration with community participants. CPAG also educates artists and the public about the history and possibilities of collaborative public art. Several of its works have been large bricolage mosaics in city underpasses.

== History ==
Founded in 1971, the Chicago Public Art Group began as a cooperative of artists to enhance Chicago communities through the creation of public murals. Concerned with societal relationships to art, the group wanted to establish communication and working creative partnerships between artists and city residents. Muralists William Walker and John Pitman Weber were among the co-founders of what was then called the Chicago Muralists Group. From the beginning, a focus of the cooperative was turning some of the most neglected of urban spaces into artistic canvasses. It was influenced by the past work of individual artists working in the city. The group-created Fabric of our Lives, by Miriam Socoloff and Cynthia Weiss in 1980, lays claim to being the first community-based mosaic in the United States, according to executive director emeritus Jon Pounds.

== Artwork ==
There are hundreds of significant artworks associated with the Group in various public places, mostly within the City of Chicago. These include murals, mosaics, sculptures, and space or landscape designs. Most projects have included community organizations, residents, or schools in the creation of these art pieces. Some public artworks may cost as much as $100,000 and more to create. These include large mosaics placed on the walls of highway underpasses, or murals on buildings or train viaducts. The artworks are often community, local history, or environment themed.

The large glass mosaic "Aqua Interlude & Reflection" (2011), in a pedestrian underpass, was created with the help of a youth project and explores light and water. The large tile and glass mosaic "Indian Land Dancing" (2009) in a highway underpass, was created with the help of the American Indian Center and illustrates local Native American history and modern experience. Another large underpass mural and mosaic, "Growing" (2008) is based around the theme of local community and growth.

Several of these artworks, which may be 10 to 12 feet high, and 120 to 160 feet long, have employed a type of bricolage technique. Reporter Geoffery Bear described this as the "technique of taking broken pieces of ceramic tile, and other three dimensional objects, pieces of mirror, actual photographs, and putting it all together." According to Sue-Lyn Erbeck and Marty Bach, this technique can be "loose and improvisational" and describe a representative process involving: "1. Photos ... transferred to acetate, projected onto the wall and traced with acrylic paint. 2. Broken pieces of mirror applied to the outline. 3. Loose elements, such as the clouds and words, attached. 4. Buckets of various broken elements such as ceramic tiles, china and porcelain, filled in around outlines. 5. Spaces between the tiles grouted and painted. 6. Paintings . . . attached to the wall."

== Organization ==
Chicago Public Art Group's mission includes designing public art, enhancing individual artistic skills and expression, educating professional artists concerning issues of public art, and building community appreciation with respect to the benefits of public art creation. The Group's board of directors includes artists and community leaders. It provides artistic leadership and professional management to public and private organizations in the creation of art. The organization is centered on an elected group of "Core Artists," who have previously worked on or led its projects. Its "Senior Artists Circle" is an invitation only group that recognizes prominent public artists. The Group also promotes the restoration of artwork.
