= 1946 Delaware State Hornets football team =

American college football season

1946 Delaware State Hornets football

Flower Bowl, W 7–6 vs. Florida Normal
- Conference: Colored Intercollegiate Athletic Association
- Record: 5–4 (3–4 CIAA)
- Head coach: Tom Conrad (3rd season)

1946 Colored Intercollegiate Athletic Association football standings
	Conf.					Overall
Team	W		L		T	W		L		T
No. 2 Morgan State $	7	–	0	–	0	8	–	0	–	0
No. 10 West Virginia State	5	–	2	–	0	6	–	3	–	1
Virginia State	5	–	2	–	0	7	–	2	–	0
No. 16 Howard	6	–	2	–	0	6	–	3	–	0
No. 20 Lincoln (PA)	4	–	2	–	0	6	–	3	–	0
No. 16 North Carolina College	5	–	3	–	0	7	–	3	–	0
No. 18 North Carolina A&T	3	–	4	–	0	4	–	4	–	0
No. 19 Shaw	3	–	3	–	1	5	–	3	–	1
No. 22 Hampton	4	–	4	–	0	4	–	4	–	0
Delaware State	3	–	4	–	0	5	–	4	–	0
No. 18 Bluefield State	3	–	4	–	1	4	–	4	–	1
Winston-Salem State	1	–	4	–	1	3	–	5	–	1
No. 22 Virginia Union	1	–	5	–	1	3	–	5	–	1
Johnson C. Smith	0	–	5	–	2	0	–	6	–	2
Saint Paul's (VA)	0	–	6	–	0	0	–	6	–	0
St. Augustine's	1	–	0	–	0	3	–	1	–	0
$ – Conference champion; Rankings from Pittsburgh Courier Dickinson System

The 1946 Delaware State Hornets football team represented the State College for Colored Students—now known as Delaware State University—as a member of Colored Intercollegiate Athletic Association (CIAA) in the 1946 college football season. The Hornets compiled a 5–4 record under coach Tom Conrad. The Hornets were invited to three bowls after the season: the Cattle Bowl in Fort Worth, Texas, the Palmetto Bowl in Columbia, South Carolina, and the Flower Bowl in Jacksonville, Florida. They turned down offers from Texas and South Carolina to play against Florida Normal in the Flower Bowl. They won the game 7–6 after blocking a conversion attempt at the end of the game. It is currently the only Delaware State bowl game win in history.

== Schedule ==
Date	Opponent	Site	Result	Attendance	Source
September 28	North Carolina Central	Dover, DE	L 6–32		
October 5	Morgan State	Dover, DE	L 6–22		
October 12	at Lincoln (PA)	Lincoln, PA	L 6–19		
October 19	Princess Anne*		W 43–7		
October 26	Hampton		L 0–12		
November 2	vs. Howard	Wilmington Park; Wilmington, DE	W 19–7	2,500	
November 16	Winston-Salem	Dover, DE	W 12–6		
November 23	at Saint Paul's (VA)	Lawrenceville, VA	W 50–0		
January 1, 1947	at Florida Normal*	Jacksonville, FL (Flower Bowl)	W 7–6	2,500	
*Non-conference game
