= 1946 Fisk Bulldogs football team =

American college football season

1946 Fisk Bulldogs football
- Conference: Southern Intercollegiate Athletic Conference
- Record: 3–4–1 (0–3–1 SIAC)
- Head coach: Julian Bell (1st season)

1946 Southern Intercollegiate Athletic Conference football standings
	Conf.					Overall
Team	W		L		T	W		L		T
No. 8 Florida A&M $	6	–	0	–	0	6	–	4	–	1
No. 5 Lane	6	–	0	–	0	8	–	2	–	0
No. 3 Tuskegee	5	–	1	–	0	10	–	2	–	0
No. 14 South Carolina State	4	–	3	–	1	5	–	3	–	1
No. 16 Morris Brown	3	–	2	–	1	4	–	4	–	1
No. 12 Xavier (LA)	1	–	1	–	0	4	–	2	–	0
Knoxville	2	–	2	–	3	4	–	3	–	3
No. 17 Benedict	3	–	3	–	0	5	–	5	–	0
No. 20 Alabama State	3	–	4	–	1	4	–	4	–	1
No. 18 Clark (GA)	2	–	3	–	0	3	–	5	–	0
No. 22 Morehouse	1	–	4	–	3	1	–	4	–	3
Alabama A&M	2	–	4	–	1	3	–	4	–	1
No. 15 Fisk	0	–	3	–	1	3	–	4	–	1
LeMoyne	0	–	3	–	1	2	–	3	–	1
Fort Valley State	0	–	5	–	0	0	–	9	–	0
$ – Conference champion; Standings were based on Dickinson System ratings.; Rankings from Pittsburgh Courier Dickinson System

The 1946 Fisk Bulldogs football team was an American football team that represented Fisk University as a member of the Southern Intercollegiate Athletic Conference (SIAC) during the 1946 college football season. In their first season under head coach Julian Bell, the Bulldogs compiled a 3–4–1 record (0–3–1 against SIAC opponents) and outscored all opponents by a total of 61 to 55.

In December 1946, The Pittsburgh Courier applied the Dickinson System to the black college teams and rated Fisk at No. 15.

The team played its home games at the Sulphur Dell in Nashville, Tennessee.

== Schedule ==
Date	Opponent	Site	Result	Attendance	Source
October 6	Miles*	Sulphur Dell; Nashville, TN	W 12–0		
October 12	at Knoxville	Knoxville, TN	L 0–6		
October 19	at Tuskegee	Tuskegee, AL	L 6–13	5,000	
October 26	LeMoyne	Sulphur Dell; Nashville, TN	T 6–6		
November 2	Philander Smith*	Sulphur Dell; Nashville, TN	W 19–6		
November 9	Dillard*^{†}	Sulphur Dell; Nashville, TN	W 13–0		
November 23	Louisville Municipal*	Maxwell Field; Louisville, KY	L 0–6		
November 30	at Florida A&M	Centennial Field; Tallahassee, Fl	L 0–18	3,000–4,000	
*Non-conference game; ^{†}Homecoming
