= 1950 Delaware State Hornets football team =

American college football season

1950 Delaware State Hornets football
- Conference: Colored Intercollegiate Athletic Association
- Record: 2–7–1 (2–6–1 CIAA)
- Head coach: Robert White (1st season)

1950 Colored Intercollegiate Athletic Association football standings
	Conf.					Overall
Team	W		L		T	W		L		T
No. 6 North Carolina A&T $	5	–	0	–	1	6	–	2	–	1
No. 8 Morgan State	5	–	0	–	2	6	–	0	–	2
No. 9 North Carolina College	6	–	1	–	0	7	–	2	–	0
No. 9 St. Augustine's	6	–	1	–	0	8	–	1	–	0
No. 16 Bluefield State	4	–	2	–	1	6	–	3	–	1
No. 11 West Virginia State	3	–	2	–	1	5	–	3	–	1
Virginia Union	6	–	3	–	0	6	–	3	–	0
No. 25 Howard	5	–	4	–	0	5	–	4	–	0
Lincoln (PA)	2	–	3	–	1	3	–	3	–	1
Virginia State	3	–	5	–	0	3	–	5	–	0
Winston-Salem State	2	–	3	–	2	2	–	3	–	2
Johnson C. Smith	2	–	4	–	1	2	–	5	–	1
Hampton	2	–	5	–	0	2	–	7	–	0
Delaware State	2	–	6	–	1	2	–	7	–	1
Shaw	1	–	8	–	0	1	–	8	–	0
Saint Paul's (VA)	0	–	7	–	0	0	–	7	–	0
$ – Conference champion; Rankings from the Pittsburgh Courier

The 1950 Delaware State Hornets football team represented Delaware State College—now known as Delaware State University—as a member of the Colored Intercollegiate Athletic Association (CIAA) in the 1950 college football season. Led by coach Robert White in his first year, the Hornets compiled a 2–7–1 record, including being shut out five times.

== Schedule ==
Date	Time	Opponent	Site	Result	Source
September 23		at Winston-Salem	Winston-Salem, NC	L 0–18	
September 30	7:30 p.m.	Morgan State	Dover, DE	L 0–20	
October 7		North Carolina College	Dover, DE	L 0–13	
October 14		Johnson C. Smith	Dover. DE	W 25–14	
October 21		Lincoln (PA)		T 0–0	
October 28		Saint Paul's (VA)		W 66–0	
November 4		Bluefield State	Dover, DE	L 36–44	
November 11		Howard	Dover, DE	L 6–7	
November 18		at St. Augustine's	Raleigh, NC	L 6–13	
November 23		Maryland State*		L 0–34	
*Non-conference game
