= 1946 Howard Bison football team =

American college football season

1946 Howard Bison football
- Conference: Colored Intercollegiate Athletic Association
- Record: 6–3 (6–2 CIAA)
- Head coach: Edward L. Jackson (2nd season)
- Home stadium: Brooks Stadium, Griffith Stadium

1946 Colored Intercollegiate Athletic Association football standings
	Conf.					Overall
Team	W		L		T	W		L		T
No. 2 Morgan State $	7	–	0	–	0	8	–	0	–	0
No. 10 West Virginia State	5	–	2	–	0	6	–	3	–	1
Virginia State	5	–	2	–	0	7	–	2	–	0
No. 16 Howard	6	–	2	–	0	6	–	3	–	0
No. 20 Lincoln (PA)	4	–	2	–	0	6	–	3	–	0
No. 16 North Carolina College	5	–	3	–	0	7	–	3	–	0
No. 18 North Carolina A&T	3	–	4	–	0	4	–	4	–	0
No. 19 Shaw	3	–	3	–	1	5	–	3	–	1
No. 22 Hampton	4	–	4	–	0	4	–	4	–	0
Delaware State	3	–	4	–	0	5	–	4	–	0
No. 18 Bluefield State	3	–	4	–	1	4	–	4	–	1
Winston-Salem State	1	–	4	–	1	3	–	5	–	1
No. 22 Virginia Union	1	–	5	–	1	3	–	5	–	1
Johnson C. Smith	0	–	5	–	2	0	–	6	–	2
Saint Paul's (VA)	0	–	6	–	0	0	–	6	–	0
St. Augustine's	1	–	0	–	0	3	–	1	–	0
$ – Conference champion; Rankings from Pittsburgh Courier Dickinson System

The 1946 Howard Bison football team was an American football team that represented Howard University as a member of the Colored Intercollegiate Athletic Association (CIAA) during the 1946 college football season. In their second season under head coach Edward L. Jackson, the team compiled a 6–2–1 record and outscored opponents by a total of 101 to 85.

The Dickinson System rated Howard in a tie for No. 16 among the black college football teams for 1946.

== Schedule ==
Date	Time	Opponent	Site	Result	Attendance	Source
September 28		at Bluefield State	Bluefield Municipal Stadium; Bluefield, WV	W 13–0		
October 5		West Virginia State	Brooks Stadium; Washington, DC	L 13–21		
October 12	2:00 p.m.	Virginia Union	Brooks Stadium; Washington, DC	W 19–13	8,000	
October 19	2:30 p.m.	Shaw^{†}	Brooks Stadium; Washington, DC	W 21–7	12,000	
October 26	2:30 p.m.	at Johnson C. Smith	American Legion Memorial Stadium; Charlotte, NC	W 12–6		
November 2		vs. Delaware State	Wilmington Park; Wilmington, DE	L 7–19	2,500	
November 9		at Hampton	Armstrong Field; Hampton, VA (rivalry)	W 9–6	6,000	
November 16	2:00 p.m.	Allen*	Brooks Stadium; Washington, DC	L 0–7	7,000	
November 28	2:00 p.m.	Lincoln (PA)	Griffith Stadium; Washington, DC	W 7–6	18,000–25,000	
*Non-conference game; ^{†}Homecoming; All times are in Eastern time
