= 1946 West Virginia State Yellow Jackets football team =

American college football season

1946 West Virginia State Yellow Jackets football

Derby Bowl, L 7–27 vs. Tennessee A&I
- Conference: Colored Intercollegiate Athletic Association
- Record: 6–3–1 (5–2 CIAA)
- Head coach: Mark Cardwell (2nd season)
- Home stadium: Lakin Field

1946 Colored Intercollegiate Athletic Association football standings
	Conf.					Overall
Team	W		L		T	W		L		T
No. 2 Morgan State $	7	–	0	–	0	8	–	0	–	0
No. 10 West Virginia State	5	–	2	–	0	6	–	3	–	1
Virginia State	5	–	2	–	0	7	–	2	–	0
No. 16 Howard	6	–	2	–	0	6	–	3	–	0
No. 20 Lincoln (PA)	4	–	2	–	0	6	–	3	–	0
No. 16 North Carolina College	5	–	3	–	0	7	–	3	–	0
No. 18 North Carolina A&T	3	–	4	–	0	4	–	4	–	0
No. 19 Shaw	3	–	3	–	1	5	–	3	–	1
No. 22 Hampton	4	–	4	–	0	4	–	4	–	0
Delaware State	3	–	4	–	0	5	–	4	–	0
No. 18 Bluefield State	3	–	4	–	1	4	–	4	–	1
Winston-Salem State	1	–	4	–	1	3	–	5	–	1
No. 22 Virginia Union	1	–	5	–	1	3	–	5	–	1
Johnson C. Smith	0	–	5	–	2	0	–	6	–	2
Saint Paul's (VA)	0	–	6	–	0	0	–	6	–	0
St. Augustine's	1	–	0	–	0	3	–	1	–	0
$ – Conference champion; Rankings from Pittsburgh Courier Dickinson System

The 1946 West Virginia State Yellow Jackets football team was an American football team that represented West Virginia State University as a member of the Colored Intercollegiate Athletic Association (CIAA) during the 1946 college football season. In their second season under head coach Mark Cardwell, the team compiled a 6–3–1 record and outscored opponents by a total of 177 to 105.

The Dickinson System rated West Virginia State as the No. 10 black college football team for 1946.

The team played its home games at Lakin Field in Institute, West Virginia.

== Schedule ==
Date	Opponent	Site	Result	Attendance	Source
September 28	Winston-Salem State	Institute, WV	W 31–0		
October 5	at Howard	Brooks Stadium; Washington, DC	W 21–13		
October 12	at Morgan State	Morgan Stadium; Baltimore, MD	L 12–13		
October 19	Johnson C. Smith	Institute, WV	W 6–0		
October 26	North Carolina A&T	Charleston, WV	L 6–19		
November 2	at Bluefield State	Bluefield, WV	W 7–6		
	Fort Knox (NY)*		W 55–0		
November 11	Virginia State	Institute, WV	W 19–14		
November 28	Wilberforce*	Dunbar Stadium; Charleston, WV (Thanksgiving Day)	T 13–13	6,000	
December 7	Tennessee A&I*	Maxwell Field; Louisville, KY (Derby Bowl)	L 7–27		
*Non-conference game
