= 1946 Arkansas AM&N Lions football team =

American college football season

1946 Arkansas AM&N Lions football

Cattle Bowl, W 7–0 vs. Lane
- Conference: Southwestern Athletic Conference
- Record: 8–2–1 (3–2–1 SWAC)
- Head coach: Lamar Allen (1st season)
- Home stadium: Athletic Field

1946 Southwestern Athletic Conference football standings
	Conf.					Overall
Team	W		L		T	W		L		T
No. 7 Southern $	6	–	0	–	0	9	–	2	–	1
No. 12 Wiley	4	–	2	–	0	6	–	3	–	1
No. 6 Arkansas AM&N	3	–	2	–	1	8	–	2	–	1
No. 9 Prairie View A&M	2	–	2	–	2	7	–	2	–	2
No. 13 Texas College	3	–	3	–	0	5	–	4	–	1
No. 22 Langston	2	–	4	–	0	2	–	6	–	1
No. 25 Bishop	2	–	4	–	1	4	–	3	–	1
No. 23 Samuel Huston	0	–	5	–	2	3	–	5	–	2
$ – Conference champion; Rankings from Pittsburgh Courier Dickinson System

The 1946 Arkansas AM&N Lions football team represented Arkansas AM&N (now known as University of Arkansas at Pine Bluff) in the Southwestern Athletic Conference (SWAC) during the 1946 college football season. In their first year under head coach Lamar Allen, the Lions compiled an 8–2–1 record (3–2–1 against SWAC opponents), defeated Lane in the Cattle Bowl, and outscored all opponents by a total of 130 to 85.

The Dickinson System rated Arkansas AM&N as the No. 6 black college football team for 1946.

== Schedule ==
Date	Time	Opponent	Site	Result	Attendance	Source
September 28		at Tillotson*	Austin, TX	W 13–0		
October 4		at Wiley	Wiley Field; Marshall, TX	L 7–32		
October 12		Texas College	Athletic Field; Pine Bluff, AR	L 0–26		
October 19		Southern	Athletic Field; Pine Bluff, AR	W 9–7		
October 26		at Prairie View A&M	Blackshear Field; Prairie View, TX	T 7–7		
November 2		Grambling*	Pine Bluff, AR	W 7–6		
November 9		at Samuel Huston	Austin, TX	W 13–0		
November 16		Langston	Athletic Field; Pine Bluff, AR	W 26–0		
November 23		at Lincoln (MO)*	Jefferson City, MO	W 13–7	300	
November 30		Philander Smith*	Athletic Field; Pine Bluff, AR	W 26–0		
January 1, 1947	2:30 p.m.	vs. Lane*	LaGrave Field; Fort Worth, TX (Cattle Bowl)	W 7–0		
*Non-conference game; All times are in Central time
