= 1946 Wiley Wildcats football team =

American college football season

1946 Wiley Wildcats football

Angel Bowl, T 6–6 vs. Florida A&M
- Conference: Southwestern Athletic Conference
- Record: 6–3–1 (4–2 SWAC)
- Head coach: Fred T. Long (24th season)
- Home stadium: Wiley Field

1946 Southwestern Athletic Conference football standings
	Conf.					Overall
Team	W		L		T	W		L		T
No. 7 Southern $	5	–	1	–	0	9	–	2	–	1
No. 12 Wiley	4	–	2	–	0	6	–	3	–	1
No. 6 Arkansas AM&N	3	–	2	–	1	8	–	2	–	1
No. 9 Prairie View A&M	2	–	2	–	2	7	–	2	–	2
No. 13 Texas College	3	–	3	–	0	5	–	4	–	1
No. 22 Langston	2	–	4	–	0	2	–	6	–	1
No. 23 Samuel Huston	0	–	5	–	1	3	–	5	–	2
$ – Conference champion; Rankings from Pittsburgh Courier Dickinson System

The 1946 Wiley Wildcats football team was an American football team that represented Wiley College in the Southwestern Athletic Conference (SWAC) during the 1946 college football season. In their 24th season under head coach Fred T. Long, the team compiled a 6–3–1 record (4–2 against SWAC opponents), finished in second place in the SWAC, and outscored opponents by a total of 234 to 65.

The Dickinson System rated Wiley in a tie for No. 12 among the black college football teams for 1946.

== Schedule ==
Date	Opponent	Site	Result	Attendance	Source
September 28	at Philander Smith*	Little Rock, AR	W 105–0		
October 4	Arkansas AM&N	Wiley Field; Marshall, TX	W 32–7		
October 14	vs. Prairie View	Cotton Bowl; Dallas, TX	W 19–0	22,000	
October 28	Tuskegee*	State Fair Stadium; Shreveport, LA	L 6–21	17,000	
November 9	at Langston	Anderson Field; Langston, OK	W 6–0		
November 15	vs. Southern	Buffalo Stadium; Houston, TX	L 7–19		
November 23	Samuel Huston	Wiley Field; Marshall, TX	W 26–6		
November 28	at Texas College	Steer Stadium; Tyler, TX	L 0–6		
December 7	Clark (GA)*	Wiley Field; Marshall, TX	W 27–0		
December 28	vs. Florida A&M*	Wrigley Field; Los Angeles, CA (Angel Bowl)	T 6–6	20,000	
*Non-conference game
