= Manuel Rivero Hall =

Gymnasium in Lincoln University, Pennsylvania

Coordinates: 39.8087°N 75.9305°W

Manuel Rivero Hall, completed in 1972, has a 2,000 seat capacity main gymnasium, eight lane Olympic-size swimming pool, classrooms, wrestling room, dance studio, training room facilities complex. A recreation area, including an eight lane bowling alley is also contained within the sports complex. The facility was originally called Alumni Memorial Gymnasium and was renamed Manuel Rivero Hall in 1986 in honor of Lincoln University Professor, Athletic Director and former Columbia University Baseball star Manuel Rivero who was part of Lincoln's Physical Education department from 1933 to 1977.
