= Lamar Allen =

American baseball & football player (1914–1989)

Biographical details
- Born: November 25, 1914; Pine Bluff, Arkansas, U.S.
- Died: May 16, 1989 (aged 74); Los Angeles, California, U.S.

Playing career
- 1936–1939: Arkansas AM&N
- Position: Quarterback

Coaching career (HC unless noted)
- 1946–1949: Arkansas AM&N
- 1959: Arkansas AM&N (line)

Head coaching record
- Overall: 17–19–5
- Bowls: 1–0

Accomplishments and honors

Records
- Baseball career
- Center fielder
- Batted: Unknown Threw: Unknown

Negro league baseball debut
- 1940, for the Birmingham Black Barons

Last appearance
- 1940, for the Birmingham Black Barons
- Stats at Baseball Reference

Teams
- Birmingham Black Barons (1940)

Lamar "Buddy" Allen (November 25, 1914 – May 16, 1989) was an American college football player and coach and baseball center fielder in the Negro leagues. He served as the head football coach at Arkansas Agricultural, Mechanical & Normal College (Arkansas AM&N)—now known as University of Arkansas at Pine Bluff—for four seasons, from to 1946 to 1949, compiling a record of 17–19–5.

Allen played as a back for Merrill High School, a segregated black school in Pine Bluff, Arkansas, which won national championships in 1932, his freshman year, and 1933. His accomplishments were such that even the state's white newspapers, including the Arkansas Gazette took notice. He played baseball with the Birmingham Black Barons in 1940.

Allen earned a master's degree in education from the University of Southern California (USC) in 1951 and continued there with postgraduate work in administration and educaftion until 1953. He returned to the football coaching staff Arkansas AM&N in 1959 as line coach under Charles Spearman.

== Head coaching record ==
Year	Team	Overall	Conference	Standing	Bowl/playoffs
Arkansas AM&N Lions / Golden Lions (Southwestern Athletic Conference) (1946–1949)
1946	Arkansas AM&N	7–2–1	3–2–1	3rd	W Cattle Bowl
1947	Arkansas AM&N	2–7–1	0–6–1	8th	
1948	Arkansas AM&N	4–5–1	2–5	6th	
1949	Arkansas AM&N	4–5–2	1–4–2	6th	
Arkansas AM&N:		17–19–5	6–17–4		
Total:		17–19–5			
