= 1946 Lincoln Blue Tigers football team =

American college football season

1946 Lincoln Blue Tigers football

Prairie View Bowl, L 0–14 vs. Prairie View A&M
- Conference: Midwest Athletic Association
- Record: 5–3–1 (2–1–1 MWAA)
- Head coach: David D. Rains (2nd season)
- Home stadium: Lincoln Field

1946 Midwest Athletic Association football standings
	Conf.					Overall
Team	W		L		T	W		L		T
No. 1 Tennessee A&I $	3	–	0	–	0	10	–	1	–	0
No. 4 Wilberforce	2	–	1	–	1	5	–	2	–	2
No. 7 Lincoln (MO)	2	–	1	–	1	5	–	3	–	1
Philander Smith	0	–	2	–	0	1	–	9	–	0
No. 19 Kentucky State	0	–	3	–	0	5	–	4	–	0
$ – Conference champion; Rankings from Pittsburgh Courier Dickinson System

The 1946 Lincoln Blue Tigers football team was an American football team that represented Lincoln University of Missouri in the Midwest Athletic Association (MWAA) during the 1946 college football season. In their second year under head coach David D. Rains, the Tigers compiled an oveall record of 5–3–1 record with a mark of 2–1–1 in conference play, tying for second place in the MWAA. Lincoln defeated Lane in the Mule Bowl on Armistice Day, lost to Prairie View A&M in the Prairie View Bowl on New Year's Day, and outscored all opponents by a total of 60 to 57.

In December 1946, The Pittsburgh Courier applied the Dickinson System to the black college teams and rated Lincoln at No. 7.

The team played its home games at Lincoln Field in Jefferson City, Missouri.

== Schedule ==
Date	Time	Opponent	Site	Result	Attendance	Source
October 5		Louisville Municipal*	Lincoln Field; Jefferson City, MO	W 12–6		
October 12		at Langston*	Page Stadium; Oklahoma City, OK	W 14–6		
October 19		at Kentucky State	Frankfort, KY	W 7–0		
October 26		at Philander Smith	Little Rock, AR	W 13–0		
November 2		Wilberforce^{†}	Lincoln Field; Jefferson City, MO	T 0–0		
November 11	7:30 p.m.	vs. Lane*	Blues Stadium; Kansas City, MO (Mule Bowl)	W 7–6		
November 16		at Tennessee A&I	Nashville, TN	L 0–12		
November 23		Arkansas AM&N*	Lincoln Field; Jefferson City, MO	L 7–13	300	
January 1, 1947		vs. Prairie View A&M*	Buffalo Stadium; Houston, TX (Prairie View Bowl)	L 0–14	1,500	
*Non-conference game; ^{†}Homecoming; All times are in Central time
