= Manuel Rivero =

Cuban baseball and football player and coach (1908–2001)

Biographical details
- Born: November 3, 1908; Havana, Cuba
- Died: August 23, 2001 (aged 92); Rising Sun, Maryland, U.S.

Playing career

Football
- 1930–1932: Columbia

Baseball
- 1931–1933: Columbia
- 1930–1934: Cuban Stars (East); Pollock's Cuban Stars

Coaching career (HC unless noted)

Football
- 1934–1947: Lincoln (PA)
- 1951: Lincoln (PA)

Administrative career (AD unless noted)
- 1934–?: Lincoln (PA)

Head coaching record
- Overall: 53–45–7
- Bowls: 1–0

Manuel Rivero (November 3, 1908 – August 23, 2001), nicknamed "the Golden Flash", was an American football, basketball, and baseball player and coach.

A native of Havana, Cuba, Rivero was a three-year football lettermen at Columbia University from 1930 to 1932. Between 1930 and 1934, he played professional baseball in the Negro leagues for the Cuban Stars (East) and Pollock's Cuban Stars. Rivero went on to hold a variety of coaching positions at Lincoln University in Pennsylvania from 1933 to 1977. The school's home gymnasium, Manuel Rivero Hall, is named in his honor. Rivero died in Rising Sun, Maryland in 2001 at age 92.

== Head coaching record ==
=== Football ===
Year	Team	Overall	Conference	Standing	Bowl/playoffs
Lincoln Lions (Colored Intercollegiate Athletic Association) (1934–1947)
1934	Lincoln	1–6	0–5	13th	
1935	Lincoln	2–3–2	2–2–1	7th	
1936	Lincoln	1–4	1–4	11th	
1937	Lincoln	6–2–1	3–2–1	5th	
1938	Lincoln	3–5	2–5	11th	
1939	Lincoln	6–1–1	4–1–1	4th	
1940	Lincoln	7–1	4–1	2nd	
1941	Lincoln	4–3	2–3	NA	
1942	Lincoln	2–3–1	1–1–1	7th	
1943	No team—World War II				
1944	Lincoln	2–3–1	1–3	7th	
1945	Lincoln	2–5	2–4	9th	
1946	Lincoln	6–3	4–2	5th	W Orange Blossom Classic
1947	Lincoln	5–4–1	3–3–1	7th	
Lincoln Lions (Central Intercollegiate Athletic Association) (1951)
1951	Lincoln	6–2	4–2	5th	
Lincoln:		53–45–7	33–38–5		
Total:		53–45–7			
