= 1946 Wilberforce Green Wave football team =

American college football season

1946 Wilberforce State Green Wave football
- Conference: Midwest Athletic Association
- Record: 5–2–2 (2–1–1 MWAA)
- Head coach: Gaston F. Lewis (11th season)

1946 Midwest Athletic Association football standings
	Conf.					Overall
Team	W		L		T	W		L		T
No. 1 Tennessee A&I $	3	–	0	–	0	10	–	1	–	0
No. 4 Wilberforce	2	–	1	–	1	5	–	2	–	2
No. 7 Lincoln (MO)	2	–	1	–	1	5	–	3	–	1
Philander Smith	0	–	2	–	0	1	–	9	–	0
No. 19 Kentucky State	0	–	3	–	0	5	–	4	–	0
$ – Conference champion; Rankings from Pittsburgh Courier Dickinson System

The 1946 Wilberforce Green Wave football team was an American football team that represented Wilberforce University in the Midwest Athletic Association (MWAA) during the 1946 college football season. In its 11th season under head coach Gaston F. Lewis, the team compiled an overall record of 5–2–2 with a mark of 2–1–1 in conference play, tying for second place in the MWAA. Wilberforce was invited to play in three bowl games (Angel Bowl, Cattle Bowl, and Tobacco Bowl), rejected the Cattle and Tobacco Bowl bids, and accepted the bid to play in the Angel Bowl, but its acceptance was made several days too late.

The Dickinson System rated Wilberforce as the No. 4 black college football team for 1946, behind No. 1 Tennessee A&I, No. 2 Morgan State, and No. 3 Tuskegee.

== Schedule ==
Date	Opponent	Site	Result	Attendance	Source
September 28	Lockbourne Army Air Base*		W 71–0		
October 5	vs. Florida A&M*	Tinker Field; Orlando, FL	W 22–14		
October 11	vs. Tuskegee*	Comiskey Park; Chicago, IL	L 7–14	15,000–20,000	
October 19	Philander Smith	Wilberforce Stadium; Xenia, OH	W 32–0		
October 26	Tennessee A&I^{†}	Wilberforce Stadium; Xenia, OH	L 7–25	8,000	
November 2	at Lincoln (MO)	Lincoln Field; Jefferson City, MO	T 0–0		
November 9	at Kentucky State	Alumni Field; Frankfort, KY	W 7–6		
November 16	vs. Lincoln (PA)*	Shibe Park; Philadelphia, PA	W 26–19	4,000	
November 28	at West Virginia State*	Dunbar Stadium; Charleston, WV	T 13–13	6,000	
*Non-conference game; ^{†}Homecoming
