= Bob Crawford (photographer) =

American photographer

- Born: 1939
- Died: 2015 (aged 75–76)
- Known for: Photography

Bob Crawford (1939–2015) was an American photojournalist.

Crawford worked in Chicago and is known for his documentary photos of the area. He photographed the creation of the 1967 South Side mural Wall of Respect.

His work is in the collection of the Art Institute of Chicago, and the National Gallery of Art.

His work was included in the 2025 exhibition Photography and the Black Arts Movement, 1955–1985 at the National Gallery of Art.
