= 1946 Lincoln Lions football team =

American college football season

1946 Lincoln Lions football

Orange Blossom Classic, W 20–14 vs. Florida A&M
- Conference: Colored Intercollegiate Athletic Association
- Record: 6–3 (4–2 CIAA)
- Head coach: Manuel Rivero (12th season)

1946 Colored Intercollegiate Athletic Association football standings
	Conf.					Overall
Team	W		L		T	W		L		T
No. 2 Morgan State $	7	–	0	–	0	8	–	0	–	0
No. 10 West Virginia State	5	–	2	–	0	6	–	3	–	1
Virginia State	5	–	2	–	0	7	–	2	–	0
No. 16 Howard	6	–	2	–	0	6	–	3	–	0
No. 20 Lincoln (PA)	4	–	2	–	0	6	–	3	–	0
No. 16 North Carolina College	5	–	3	–	0	7	–	3	–	0
No. 18 North Carolina A&T	3	–	4	–	0	4	–	4	–	0
No. 19 Shaw	3	–	3	–	1	5	–	3	–	1
No. 22 Hampton	4	–	4	–	0	4	–	4	–	0
Delaware State	3	–	4	–	0	5	–	4	–	0
No. 18 Bluefield State	3	–	4	–	1	4	–	4	–	1
Winston-Salem State	1	–	4	–	1	3	–	5	–	1
No. 22 Virginia Union	1	–	5	–	1	3	–	5	–	1
Johnson C. Smith	0	–	5	–	2	0	–	6	–	2
Saint Paul's (VA)	0	–	6	–	0	0	–	6	–	0
St. Augustine's	1	–	0	–	0	3	–	1	–	0
$ – Conference champion; Rankings from Pittsburgh Courier Dickinson System

The 1946 Lincoln Lions football team was an American football team that represented Lincoln University of Pennsylvania as a member of the Colored Intercollegiate Athletic Association (CIAA) during the 1946 college football season. In their 12th season under head coach Manuel Rivero, the team compiled a 6–3 record and outscored opponents by a total of 235 to 107.

The Dickinson System rated Lincoln as the No. 20 black college football team for 1946.

== Schedule ==
Date	Time	Opponent	Site	Result	Attendance	Source
October 5		at Saint Paul's (VA)	Lawrenceville, VA	W 68–0		
October 12		Delaware State	Oxford, PA	W 19–6		
October 19		vs. Virginia Union	Philadelphia, PA	W 21–6		
October 26		at Morgan State	Baltimore, MD	L 0–28		
November 2		Hampton	Oxford, PA	W 10–7		
November 9		Cheyney*	Oxford, PA	W 72–13		
November 16		vs. Wilberforce*	Shibe Park; Philadelphia, PA	L 19–26	4,000	
November 28	2:00 p.m.	at Howard	Griffith Stadium; Washington, DC	L 6–7	18,000–25,000	
December 7		vs. Florida A&M*	Tampa, FL (Orange Blossom Classic)	W 20–14	> 9,000	
*Non-conference game; All times are in Eastern time
