= Laini (Sylvia) Abernathy =

American artist and activist (died 2010)

- Born: Sylvia
- Died: 2010
- Other names: Laini Abernathy
- Education: Illinois Institute of Technology
- Occupations: Artist and activist
- Known for: Chicago's Black arts movement
- Notable work: jazz record covers, Wall of Respect
- Spouse: Fundi (Billy) Abernathy

Laini (Sylvia) Abernathy (died 2010) was an American artist and activist. She was an important figure in Chicago's Black arts movement, often working in collaboration with her husband, photographer Fundi (Billy) Abernathy.

== Career ==
Abernathy studied at the Illinois Institute of Technology, located on the South Side of Chicago. As a young artist, Abernathy was commissioned by Delmark Records to design album covers for jazz records, including such iconic releases as Sound (1966) by Roscoe Mitchell of the Art Ensemble of Chicago, Sun Ra's Sun Song (1966), and Leon Sash's I Remember Newport (1967), some of which featured Fundi's photographs. Abernathy's designs typically worked with Art Deco-inspired typefaces and vibrant color block patterns mirroring the deconstructive, forward-thinking nature of the music. She was working during a time when few African-Americans held positions of creative authority on the visual side of the predominantly Black jazz movement -- jazz album design, popularized by designers such as Paul Bacon and Reid Miles, made use of bold abstract forms and negative space to subvert the racist stereotypes associated with black music in previous decades. This art scene, however, was largely male-dominated and white, despite the progressive cultural integration it advocated.

In 1967, she joined the Organization of Black American Culture (OBAC), an organization founded to continue the legacy of Malcolm X after his assassination, promoting art, literature and music with a message of Black liberation and pride. Abernathy designed the layout of the Wall of Respect, a street mural that featured African American leaders. Her design featured sections that were each designed to be filled by an artist or group of artists. After changing her name to the Africanized Laini, she designed the 1970 experimental photo book “In Our Terribleness (Some Elements and Meaning in Black Style)” featuring poetry by Amiri Baraka and images by her husband, Fundi.

Abernathy died in 2010. She received little mainstream recognition, although her work helped to pioneer the avant-garde visual aesthetic now inseparably linked with 1960s experimental jazz music.
