= 1946 Texas College Steers football team =

American college football season

1946 Texas College Steers football
- Conference: Southwestern Athletic Conference
- Record: 5–4–1 (3–3 SWAC)
- Head coach: Alexander Durley (5th season)

1946 Southwestern Athletic Conference football standings
| | Conf. | | | | | Overall |
| Team | W | | L | | T | W | | L | | T |
|---|---|---|---|---|---|---|---|---|---|---|
| No. 7 Southern $ | 6 | – | 0 | – | 0 | 9 | – | 2 | – | 1 |
| No. 12 Wiley | 4 | – | 2 | – | 0 | 6 | – | 3 | – | 1 |
| No. 6 Arkansas AM&N | 3 | – | 2 | – | 1 | 8 | – | 2 | – | 1 |
| No. 9 Prairie View A&M | 2 | – | 2 | – | 2 | 7 | – | 2 | – | 2 |
| No. 13 Texas College | 3 | – | 3 | – | 0 | 5 | – | 4 | – | 1 |
| No. 22 Langston | 2 | – | 4 | – | 0 | 2 | – | 6 | – | 1 |
| No. 25 Bishop | 2 | – | 4 | – | 1 | 4 | – | 3 | – | 1 |
| No. 23 Samuel Huston | 0 | – | 5 | – | 2 | 3 | – | 5 | – | 2 |
$ – Conference champion; Rankings from Pittsburgh Courier Dickinson System

The 1946 Texas College Steers football team was an American football team that represented Texas College in the Southwestern Athletic Conference (SWAC) during the 1946 college football season. In their fifth season under head coach Alexander Durley, the team compiled a 5–4–1 record (3–3 against SWAC opponents) and outscored opponents by a total of 183 to 85.

In December 1946, The Pittsburgh Courier applied the Dickinson System to the black college teams and rated Texas College at No. 13.

The team played its home games at Steer Stadium in Tyler, Texas.

== Schedule ==
| Date | Time | Opponent | Site | Result | Attendance | Source |
|---|---|---|---|---|---|---|
| September 27 | | at Tennessee A&I* | Sulphur Dell; Nashville, TN | L 13–20 | 7,000 | |
| October 5 | | Samuel Huston | Steer Stadium; Tyler, TX | W 12–0 | | |
| October 12 | | at Arkansas AM&N | Athletic Field; Pine Bluff, AR | W 26–0 | | |
| October 19 | | vs. Langston | Farrington Field; Fort Worth, TX | L 20–21 | 5,500 | |
| October 26 | | at Kentucky State* | Alumni Field; Frankfort, KY | W 26–7 | 6,000 | |
| November 2 | 2:00 p.m. | Southern | Steer Stadium; Tyler, TX | L 18–19 | | |
| November 9 | | at Prairie View | Blackshear Field; Prairie View, TX | L 0–12 | | |
| November 16 | | Tillotson* | Steer Stadium; Tyler, TX | W 56–0 | | |
| November 22 | | at Houston College* | Buffalo Stadium; Houston, TX | T 6–6 | | |
| November 28 | | Wiley | Steer Stadium; Tyler, TX | W 6–0 | | |
*Non-conference game; All times are in Central time
