= 1946 Virginia State Trojans football team =

American college football season

1946 Virginia State Trojans football
- Conference: Colored Intercollegiate Athletic Association
- Record: 7–2 (5–2 CIAA)
- Head coach: Harry R. Jefferson (13th season)

1946 Colored Intercollegiate Athletic Association football standings
	Conf.					Overall
Team	W		L		T	W		L		T
No. 2 Morgan State $	7	–	0	–	0	8	–	0	–	0
No. 10 West Virginia State	5	–	2	–	0	6	–	3	–	1
Virginia State	5	–	2	–	0	7	–	2	–	0
No. 16 Howard	6	–	2	–	0	6	–	3	–	0
No. 20 Lincoln (PA)	4	–	2	–	0	6	–	3	–	0
No. 16 North Carolina College	5	–	3	–	0	7	–	3	–	0
No. 18 North Carolina A&T	3	–	4	–	0	4	–	4	–	0
No. 19 Shaw	3	–	3	–	1	5	–	3	–	1
No. 22 Hampton	4	–	4	–	0	4	–	4	–	0
Delaware State	3	–	4	–	0	5	–	4	–	0
No. 18 Bluefield State	3	–	4	–	1	4	–	4	–	1
Winston-Salem State	1	–	4	–	1	3	–	5	–	1
No. 22 Virginia Union	1	–	5	–	1	3	–	5	–	1
Johnson C. Smith	0	–	5	–	2	0	–	6	–	2
Saint Paul's (VA)	0	–	6	–	0	0	–	6	–	0
St. Augustine's	1	–	0	–	0	3	–	1	–	0
$ – Conference champion; Rankings from Pittsburgh Courier Dickinson System

The 1946 Virginia State Trojans football team was an American football team that represented Virginia State College as a member of the Colored Intercollegiate Athletic Association (CIAA) during the 1946 college football season. In their 13th season under head coach Harry R. Jefferson, the team compiled a 7–2 record (5–2 against CIAA opponents) and outscored all opponents by a total of 134 to 59.

== Schedule ==
Date	Opponent	Site	Result	Attendance	Source
September 28	Allen*	Petersburg, VA	W 12–6		
October 3	at Brown Bombers*	Norfolk, VA	W 33–0		
October 12	at Johnson C. Smith	Charlotte, NC	W 20–0		
October 19	Hampton	Petersburg, VA	W 14–9		
November 2	at Virginia Union	Richmond, VA	W 13–6		
November 11	at West Virginia State	Institute, WV	L 14–19		
November 16	at North Carolina A&T	Greensboro, NC	W 14–7		
November 23	North Carolina College	Peterburg, VA	W 14–6		
November 28	Morgan State	Petersburg, VA	L 0–6	12,000	
*Non-conference game
