= 1946 Tuskegee Golden Tigers football team =

American college football season

1946 Tuskegee Golden Tigers football

Yam Bowl, L 7–64 vs. Southern
- Conference: Southern Intercollegiate Athletic Conference
- Record: 10–2 (5–1 SIAC)
- Head coach: Cleve Abbott (24th season)
- Home stadium: Alumni Bowl

1946 Southern Intercollegiate Athletic Conference football standings
| | Conf. | | | | | Overall |
| Team | W | | L | | T | W | | L | | T |
|---|---|---|---|---|---|---|---|---|---|---|
| No. 8 Florida A&M $ | 6 | – | 0 | – | 0 | 6 | – | 4 | – | 1 |
| No. 5 Lane | 6 | – | 0 | – | 0 | 8 | – | 2 | – | 0 |
| No. 3 Tuskegee | 5 | – | 1 | – | 0 | 10 | – | 2 | – | 0 |
| No. 14 South Carolina State | 4 | – | 3 | – | 1 | 5 | – | 3 | – | 1 |
| No. 16 Morris Brown | 3 | – | 2 | – | 1 | 4 | – | 4 | – | 1 |
| No. 12 Xavier (LA) | 1 | – | 1 | – | 0 | 4 | – | 2 | – | 0 |
| Knoxville | 2 | – | 2 | – | 3 | 4 | – | 3 | – | 3 |
| No. 17 Benedict | 3 | – | 3 | – | 0 | 5 | – | 5 | – | 0 |
| No. 20 Alabama State | 3 | – | 4 | – | 1 | 4 | – | 4 | – | 1 |
| No. 18 Clark (GA) | 2 | – | 3 | – | 0 | 3 | – | 5 | – | 0 |
| No. 22 Morehouse | 1 | – | 4 | – | 3 | 1 | – | 4 | – | 3 |
| Alabama A&M | 2 | – | 4 | – | 1 | 3 | – | 4 | – | 1 |
| No. 15 Fisk | 0 | – | 3 | – | 1 | 3 | – | 4 | – | 1 |
| LeMoyne | 0 | – | 3 | – | 1 | 2 | – | 3 | – | 1 |
| Fort Valley State | 0 | – | 5 | – | 0 | 0 | – | 9 | – | 0 |
$ – Conference champion; Standings were based on Dickinson System ratings.; Rankings from Pittsburgh Courier Dickinson System

The 1946 Tuskegee Golden Tigers football team represented the Tuskegee Institute—now known as Tuskegee University—as a member of the Southern Intercollegiate Athletic Conference (SIAC) during the 1946 college football season. In their 24th season under head coach Cleve Abbott, Tuskegee compiled a 10–2 record (5–1 against SIAC opponents), lost to Southern in the Yam Bowl.

The Dickinson System rated Tuskegee as the No. 3 black college football team for 1946, behind No. 1 Tennessee A&I and No. 2 Morgan State.

Two Tuskegee players were selected as first-team player on The Pittsburgh Courier's 1946 All-America team: freshman guard Herman Mabrie from Tulsa, Oklahoma; and junior back Whitney Van Cleve from Kokomo, Indiana. Two other were named to the second team: center Simmons and quarterback Robert Moore.

The team played home games at the Alumni Bowl in Tuskegee, Alabama.

== Schedule ==
| Date | Time | Opponent | Site | Result | Attendance | Source |
|---|---|---|---|---|---|---|
| September 14 | | Fort Benning* | Alumni Bowl; Tuskegee, AL | W 56–0 | 5,000 | |
| September 21 | | Philander Smith* | Tuskegee, AL | W 59–0 | | |
| September 28 | | Grambling* | Tuskegee, AL | W 21–6 | | |
| October 4 | 8:00 p.m. | vs. Clark (GA) | Rickwood Field; Birmingham, AL | W 33–0 | 6,500 | |
| October 11 | 8:30 p.m. | vs. Wilberforce* | Comiskey Park; Chicago, IL | W 14–7 | 15,000–20,000 | |
| October 19 | | Fisk | Tuskegee, AL | W 13–6 | 5,000 | |
| October 25 | | vs. Morehouse | Memorial Stadium; Columbus, GA | W 15–0 | 13,000 | |
| October 28 | | vs. Wiley* | State Fair Stadium; Shreveport, LA | W 21–6 | 17,000 | |
| November 9 | | at Florida A&M | Sampon-Bragg Field; Tallahassee, FL | L 12–21 | 5,000 | |
| November 16 | | South Carolina State^{†} | Alumni Bowl; Tuskegee, AL | W 30–14 | | |
| November 28 | | at Alabama State | Cramton Bowl; Montgomery, AL (Turkey Day Classic) | W 26–14 | 13,000 | |
| December 25 | | vs. Southern* | Dal-Hi Stadium; Dallas, TX (Yam Bowl) | L 7–64 | 5,000 | |
*Non-conference game; ^{†}Homecoming; All times are in Central time
