= 1946 Morgan State Bears football team =

American college football season

1946 Morgan State Bears football

Black college national champion CIAA champion
- Conference: Colored Intercollegiate Athletic Association
- Record: 8–0 (7–0 CIAA)
- Head coach: Edward P. Hurt (18th season)

1946 Colored Intercollegiate Athletic Association football standings
| | Conf. | | | | | Overall |
| Team | W | | L | | T | W | | L | | T |
|---|---|---|---|---|---|---|---|---|---|---|
| No. 2 Morgan State $ | 7 | – | 0 | – | 0 | 8 | – | 0 | – | 0 |
| No. 10 West Virginia State | 5 | – | 2 | – | 0 | 6 | – | 3 | – | 1 |
| Virginia State | 5 | – | 2 | – | 0 | 7 | – | 2 | – | 0 |
| No. 16 Howard | 6 | – | 2 | – | 0 | 6 | – | 3 | – | 0 |
| No. 20 Lincoln (PA) | 4 | – | 2 | – | 0 | 6 | – | 3 | – | 0 |
| No. 16 North Carolina College | 5 | – | 3 | – | 0 | 7 | – | 3 | – | 0 |
| No. 18 North Carolina A&T | 3 | – | 4 | – | 0 | 4 | – | 4 | – | 0 |
| No. 19 Shaw | 3 | – | 3 | – | 1 | 5 | – | 3 | – | 1 |
| No. 22 Hampton | 4 | – | 4 | – | 0 | 4 | – | 4 | – | 0 |
| Delaware State | 3 | – | 4 | – | 0 | 5 | – | 4 | – | 0 |
| No. 18 Bluefield State | 3 | – | 4 | – | 1 | 4 | – | 4 | – | 1 |
| Winston-Salem State | 1 | – | 4 | – | 1 | 3 | – | 5 | – | 1 |
| No. 22 Virginia Union | 1 | – | 5 | – | 1 | 3 | – | 5 | – | 1 |
| Johnson C. Smith | 0 | – | 5 | – | 2 | 0 | – | 6 | – | 2 |
| Saint Paul's (VA) | 0 | – | 6 | – | 0 | 0 | – | 6 | – | 0 |
| St. Augustine's | 1 | – | 0 | – | 0 | 3 | – | 1 | – | 0 |
$ – Conference champion; Rankings from Pittsburgh Courier Dickinson System

The 1946 Morgan State Bears football team was an American football team that represented Morgan State College in the Colored Intercollegiate Athletic Association (CIAA) during the 1946 college football season. In their 18th season under head coach Edward P. Hurt, the Bears compiled an 8–0 record, won the CIAA championship, shut out four of eight opponents, and outscored all opponents by a total of 151 to 31.

The Dickinson System rated Tennessee A&I as the No. 1 black college football team for 1946 with a score of 27.27, ahead of No. 2 Morgan State with a score of 26.0, No. 3 Tuskegee with a score of 25.0, and No. 4 Wilberforce with a score of 23.57. Despite the Dickinson rankings, the Bears were recognized as the 1946 black college national co-champion along with Tennessee A&I.

The 1946 season was the 10th of 12 undefeated season for Morgan State under head coach Edgar Hurt. Key players on the 1946 team included backs Terry Day and George Watkins, quarterbacks Cyril Byron and Oscar Givens, fullback George Rooks, halfback Jonathan Campbell, center Earl F. Couch II, tackles Bertram Coppock and Lorenzo Thomas, end Joseph Eggleston, placekicker Willard Jones, and punter Tippy Day.

== Schedule ==
| Date | Opponent | Site | Result | Attendance | Source |
|---|---|---|---|---|---|
| October 5 | at Delaware State | Dover, DE | W 22–6 | | |
| October 12 | West Virginia State | Morgan Stadium; Baltimore, MD | W 13–12 | | |
| October 19 | Grambling* | Morgan Stadium; Baltimore, MD | W 35–0 | | |
| October 26 | Lincoln (PA) | Morgan Stadium; Baltimore, MD | W 28–0 | | |
| November 2 | at North Carolina A&T | Greensboro, NC | W 12–7 | | |
| November 9 | at Bluefield State | Bluefield, WV | W 15–6 | | |
| November 16 | Hampton^{†} | Baltimore, MD | W 20–0 | | |
| November 28 | at Virginia State | Petersburg, VA | W 6–0 | 12,000 | |
*Non-conference game; ^{†}Homecoming
