= 1946 Tennessee A&I Tigers football team =

American college football season

1946 Tennessee A&I Tigers football

Black college national co-champion MWAA champion

Vulcan Bowl, W 32–0 vs. Louisville Municipal
- Conference: Midwest Athletic Association
- Record: 10–1 (3–0 MWAA)
- Head coach: Henry Kean (3rd season)
- Home stadium: Sulphur Dell, Tennessee State Stadium

1946 Midwest Athletic Association football standings
	Conf.					Overall
Team	W		L		T	W		L		T
No. 1 Tennessee A&I $	3	–	0	–	0	10	–	1	–	0
No. 4 Wilberforce	2	–	1	–	1	5	–	2	–	2
No. 7 Lincoln (MO)	2	–	1	–	1	5	–	3	–	1
Philander Smith	0	–	2	–	0	1	–	9	–	0
No. 19 Kentucky State	0	–	3	–	0	5	–	4	–	0
$ – Conference champion; Rankings from Pittsburgh Courier Dickinson System

The 1946 Tennessee A&I Tigers football team represented Tennessee Agricultural & Industrial State College as a member of the Midwest Athletic Association (MWAA) during the 1946 college football season. In their third season under head coach Henry Kean, the Tigers compiled a 10–1 record, won the MWAA championship, shut out six of eleven opponents, defeated West Virginia State in the Derby Bowl and Louisville Municipal in the Vulcan Bowl, and outscored all opponents by a total of 247 to 61. The team played its home games at Tennessee State Stadium and Sulphur Dell in Nashville, Tennessee.

The Dickinson System rated Tennessee A&I as the No. 1 black college football team for 1946 with a score of 27.27, ahead of No. 2 Morgan State with a score of 26.0, No. 3 Tuskegee with a score of 25.0, and No. 4 Wilberforce with a score of 23.57. The Pittsburgh Courier recognized Tennessee A&I and Morgan State as the 1946 black college national co-champions.

Key players included fullback Ralph Pulley.

== Schedule ==
Date	Opponent	Site	Result	Attendance	Source
September 27	Texas College*	Sulphur Dell; Nashville, TN	W 20–13	7,000	
October 5	Langston*	Tennessee State Stadium; Nashville, TN	W 27–0		
October 12	Clark (GA)*	Tennessee State Stadium; Nashville, TN	W 26–0	5,000	
October 26	at Wilberforce	Xenia, OH	W 25–7	8,000	
November 2	vs. North Carolina Central*	Griffith Stadium; Washington, DC	L 6–14	22,000	
November 9	at Southern*	Scotlandville, LA	W 21–20		
November 16	Lincoln (MO)*	Nashville, TN	W 12–0		
November 23	at Kentucky State	Frankfort, KY	W 19–0		
November 28	Knoxville*	Nashville, TN	W 32–0		
December 7	vs. West Virginia State*	Maxwell Field; Louisville, KY (Derby Bowl)	W 27–7		
January 1, 1947	vs. Louisville Municipal*	Birmingham, AL (Vulcan Bowl)	W 32–0	4,000	
*Non-conference game
