= William Walker (muralist) =

American muralist (1927–2011)

- Born: May 9, 1927; Birmingham, Alabama
- Died: September 12, 2011 (aged 84); Chicago, Illinois
- Education: Columbus Gallery of Art
- Known for: Painting

William Walker (May 9, 1927 - September 12, 2011) was a notable muralist from Chicago. He was one of the founders of the Organization of Black American Culture (OBAC) and one of the leaders in the project involving the Wall of Respect. He was also one of the critical founders of the mural movements in Chicago during the 1960s. He has cited Jacob Lawrence, Charles White, and Chicago painter William McBride, as well as the work of Mexican muralists Diego Rivera, David Alfaro Siqueiros, and Jose Clemente Orozco as important influences.

== Early life and education ==
William Walker was born in Birmingham, Alabama in 1927. His father left home shortly after he was born and his mother, Millie Lee, moved to Chicago when he was two years old to find work. He was raised mainly by his grandmother, Lucy Arnold, until 1938 when he moved to Chicago to live with his mother. Walker was drafted during World War II and later reenlisted so he could get four years of college tuition under the GI Bill. He was a mail clerk and then an MP with the 99th Pursuit Squadron. In 1949, after serving in both World War II and in the Korean War, Walker enrolled in commercial art courses at the Columbus Gallery of Art in Columbus, Ohio (now Columbus College of Art and Design). He switched majors from commercial to fine art halfway through his degree, crediting his instructor Joseph Canzani for the change, and became the first African-American man to win the school's 47th annual group exhibition award in 1952.

== Career ==
After graduating, he went to Memphis where he painted his first murals. A year later in 1955, Walker returned to Chicago and worked as a decorative painter and a postal worker. In 1967, he participated in a project related to the Organization for Black American Culture. This project was a community mural that would honor African American heroes and was named "The Wall of Respect". The Wall of Respect started a nationwide movement of "people's art". From there, Walker cofounded the Chicago Mural Group (now known as the Chicago Public Art Group) with John Pitman Weber and Eugene Eda, while continuing to paint murals in Chicago. Walker painted murals to make the community more aware of the racial strife going on in America at that time and to spur individuals to get more involved in solving racial problems. Artist Murry DePillars, executive vice president of Chicago State University and a member of AfriCobra once said of Walker "...Bill didn't work to get a reputation or to be written up. He was truly doing it for the community"

William Walker was found dead of natural causes in his apartment in Chicago on September 12, 2011.

== Selected works ==
Title	Date	Location	Status
Wall of Respect	1967	43rd Street and Langley Avenue, Chicago	Destroyed by fire, 1971
Wall of Dignity	1968	Mack Avenue and Lillibridge, Detroit	
Harriet Tubman Memorial Wall	1968	Mack Avenue and Lillibridge, Detroit	
Wall of Truth	1969	43rd Street and Langley Avenue, Chicago	Destroyed by fire, 1971
Peace and Salvation: The Wall of Understanding	1970	872 N. Orleans, Chicago	Destroyed, 1991
All of Mankind	1971-73	617 W. Evergreen Ave, Chicago	Whitewashed 2015
History of the Packing House Worker	1975	4859 South Wabash, Chicago	Restored, 1998
Wall of Daydreaming and Man's Inhumanity to Man	1975	47th Street and Calumet Avenue, Chicago	Restored, 2003
Childhood is Without Prejudice	1977	56th Street and Stony Island Avenue, Chicago	Restored, 1993 and 2009
Justice Speaks: Delbert Tibbs/New Trial or Freedom	1977	57th Street and Lake Park, Chicago	Destroyed in Metra renovation, 2001/2
St. Martin Luther King	1977	49th Street and Martin Luther King Drive, Chicago	Destroyed after being defaced
Reaching Children/Touching People	1980	975 E. 132nd Street, Chicago	
You Are as Good as Anyone	1980		
Reaganomics	1982		
Wall of Community Respect	1983		
Peace, Peace	1984		
Tribute to Harold Washington		47th and Champlain	

== Exhibitions ==
- "Images of Conscience: The Art of Bill Walker", Chicago State University, 1984
- "Bill Walker: Urban Griot", Hyde Park Art Center, 2017–18

== Awards and honors ==
- 1986: City Brightener Award, Bright New City
- 1998: Hall of Honor, Illinois Labor History Society
