= Wall of Respect =

1967 mural in Chicago, IL

- Mural by various artists of the Organization of Black American Culture led by William Walker, photograph by Robert A. Sengstacke
- Year: 1967-1971
- Medium: paint on masonry
- Location: Chicago

The Wall of Respect was an outdoor mural first painted in 1967 by the Visual Arts Workshop of the Organization of Black American Culture (OBAC). It is considered the first large-scale, outdoor community mural, which spawned a movement across the U.S. and internationally. The mural represented the contributions of fourteen designers, photographers, painters, and others, notably Chicago muralist William Walker, in a design layout proposed by Laini (Sylvia) Abernathy. Some of the artists would go on to found the influential AfriCOBRA artists collective. The work comprised a montage of portraits of heroes and heroines of African American history painted on the sides of two story, closed tavern building at the corner of Chicago's East 43rd Street and South Langley Avenue, in Bronzeville, Chicago, sometimes called the Black Belt. Images included Nat Turner, Elijah Muhammad, Malcolm X, Muhammad Ali, Gwendolyn Brooks, W. E. B. Du Bois, Marcus Garvey, Aretha Franklin, and Harriet Tubman, among others. While it only lasted a few years, until the building was torn down in 1972, it inspired community mural projects across the United States and internationally. The creation of the mural was documented by the photographer Bob Crawford.

Wall of Respect was an example of the Black Arts Movement, an artistic school associated with the Black Power Movement. The scholarly journal Science & Society underscored the significance of the Wall of Respect as "the first collective street mural", in the "important subject [of] the recently emerged street art movement." The Wall became famous as a "revolutionary political artwork of black liberation". Soon after its creation, a six-page feature spread in Ebony magazine brought it to the attention of African Americans nationwide. It became a source of inspiration and pride for the black community. For some, the Wall represented not only artistic freedom, but the freedom and liberation that could be obtained as a result of the Civil Rights Movement. However, soon after its creation, increasingly polarized interpretations of heroic action within the African American community caused conflict over the paintings, notably with the replacement by artist Eugene Eda of more defiant leaders and symbols, such as the fist of the Black Power Movement. In addition, "The Wall" served as the backdrop for community protests, speeches, outdoor poetry readings, street theater productions, and community events.

Wall of Respect catalyzed a larger mural movement in Chicago and across the United States. Chicago is known for the plethora of murals in cultural neighborhoods. The explosion of murals throughout Chicago is due, in part, to the creation of the Wall of Respect. By 1975 at least 200 large outdoor murals existed mostly in African American Neighborhoods. The Wall of Respect's success also sparked a movement of large open-air neighborhood mural paintings across to the United States. In the eight years following the Wall's unveiling, more than 1,500 murals were painted, many taking the same name, or variations beginning with, Wall of . . ..

After a 1971 fire damaged the building on which the Wall of Respect was painted, the entire structure was torn down and the mural thus destroyed. One of the few remaining pieces of The Wall is a smaller panel that consisted of an affixed photograph of Amiri Baraka by Darryl Cowherd, such panels were interspersed among the larger paintings. The larger mural also visually lived on in photography, particularly, the studies by OBAC photographer, Robert A. Sengstacke. For a time forgotten by the mainstream art world, the Wall of Respect continues to be an important cultural reference point for local community members and the subject of scholarly inquiry. Recent efforts, such as an online exhibit organized by the Block Museum at Northwestern University (which includes a clickable map of the Wall's individual portraits), and the edited volume, The Wall of Respect: Public Art and Black Liberation in 1960s Chicago (Northwestern University Press, 2017), aim to recover the Wall's history and make it accessible again.
