= Scotlandville, Baton Rouge, Louisiana =

Scotlandville
- Neighborhood
- Location within Louisiana Location within the United States
- Coordinates: 30.5204668°N 91.1787186°W
- Country: United States
- State: Louisiana
- Parish: East Baton Rouge
- Elevation: 59 ft (18 m)
- GNIS feature ID: 555993

Scotlandville is a community located in north Baton Rouge, Louisiana, United States. It was originally a small, independent rural community that developed along the Mississippi River in northern East Baton Rouge Parish. In 1914, Southern University and A&M College relocated to this community.

Gradually Scotlandville became industrialized, beginning with a Standard Oil refinery in 1909, and was a destination of Black people to urban areas in the Great Migration beginning around World War I. Its growth was stimulated also by construction of railroads along the Mississippi River. While still independent, Scotlandville became the largest majority-black community in the state. In the 20th century, it was incorporated into Baton Rouge.

== History ==
Aboriginal Native cultures existed during the Archaic period and built earthen mounds in the area now known as Scotlandville. The Monte Sano Mound site 16BTR17 was located just south of the Airport in Scotlandville area along the Monte Sano Bayou waterway, which cuts through Scotlandville and connects to the Mississippi River. When the site was demolished in 1967, three days of salvage excavations exposed platforms, charcoal, effigy beads, and projectiles determined to be dated prior to 5000 BC. The Monte Sano Mound may be the oldest indigenous mound in the United States.

Scotlandville was gradually settled after the United States acquired this territory. It was a rural area farmed after the Civil War by an assortment of European Americans and freedmen. The only Black family living in the village before the establishment of Southern University in 1914 was that of William "Dreher" Kelly and his wife Priscilla. The area was mostly farmland into the early 20th century, with other black farmers and sharecroppers.

In 1912 the state of Louisiana bought 531 acres in Scotlandville for the construction of the relocated Southern University and A&M College, a historically black college and land grant college. The state legislature wanted it moved from New Orleans to an area with more land. The state later acquired another 372 acres to support the agricultural portion of its curriculum. Southern University was built on Scott's Bluff overlooking the Mississippi River. It is no longer located within Scotlandville's boundaries.

When Standard Oil Company opened a processing plant here in 1909, it attracted many new workers, including rural black migrants from other areas of the state, and immigrants from Eastern and Southern Europe. It operated for decades, providing good jobs for graduates of Southern University.

After World War II, Black veterans such as Acie Belton of Scotlandville organized voter registration drives in order to overcome the disenfranchisement of most African Americans. In 1946 there were only 137 black voters registered in East Baton Rouge Parish. In the next few years, he and others increased the number of black registered voters in the parish to more than 2,000, mostly from Scotlandville. Knowing that engagement in politics was critical, they and other leaders continued with civil rights activities into the 1960s and later. They established the Second Ward Voters League during this early registration movement, and it still is active in evaluating and endorsing candidates.

In 1978 and 1980, some parts of Scotlandville were annexed into Baton Rouge.

== Arts and culture ==
In 2020, the Louisiana Cultural Districts program identified Scotlandville as a cultural district. The program encourages "community revitalization based on cultural activity", and offers technical assistance, resources, and tax incentives to identified cultural districts.

The Scotlandville Branch Library – part of the East Baton Rouge Parish Library – opened in 1974.

== Government ==
Today, Scotlandville is a community located in North Baton Rouge, overseen by the East Baton Rouge Parish government.

== Education ==
- The East Baton Rouge Parish School System manages the public schools from K-12.
- Scotlandville Magnet High School is located in Scotlandville.

== Infrastructure ==
Baton Rouge Metropolitan Airport, the only airport serving the Baton Rouge area, is located in Scotlandville.

== Notable people ==
- Eugene "Eda" Wade (1939-2021), muralist and educator
