= Rothrock Stadium =

Stadium in Jackson, Tennessee

- Interactive map of Rothrock Stadium
- Location: Jackson, Tennessee
- Coordinates: 35.61621°N 88.8066°W
- Capacity: 3,500

Tenant
- Lane College

Rothrock Stadium is a stadium in Jackson, Tennessee. It is primarily used for American football, and is the home field of Lane College. Built in the 1930s, it originally served as the home field of the Union University Bulldogs, until Union ended its football program in the early 1950s. Rothrock has also served as the home field for Jackson High School (later Jackson Central-Merry High School). The location is also referred to as Lane Field.
